= California State Legislature, 2023–2024 session =

2023–24 session of the California State Legislature
←	2021–2022	2025–2026	→
- The Seal of California

Overview
- Legislative body: California State Legislature
- Jurisdiction: California
- Term: December 5, 2022 – November 30, 2024

Senate
- Members: 40
- President of the Senate: Eleni Kounalakis (D); Jan. 7, 2019 – present
- President pro tempore: Toni Atkins (D–39th) Mar. 21, 2018 – Feb. 5, 2024; Mike McGuire (D–2nd) Feb. 5, 2024 – present
- Minority Leader: Brian Jones (R–16th); Dec. 5, 2022 – present
- Party control: Democratic

Assembly
- Members: 80
- Speaker: Anthony Rendon (D–62nd) Mar. 7, 2016 – Jun. 30, 2023; Robert A. Rivas (D–29th) Jun. 30, 2023 – present
- Minority Leader: James Gallagher (R–3rd); Feb. 8, 2022 – present
- Party control: Democratic

The 2023–24 session was a session of the California State Legislature. The session first convened on December 7, 2022, and ended on November 30, 2024.

== Major events ==
=== Vacancies and special elections ===
- May 24, 2024: Republican assemblymember Vince Fong (32nd–Bakersfield) resigns to become the U.S. representative for California's 20th congressional district.

=== Leadership changes ===
- June 30, 2023: Democratic assemblymember Robert A. Rivas (29th–Hollister) replaces assemblymember Anthony Rendon (62nd–Lakewood) as speaker of the Assembly, as Rendon is termed out at the end of the session.
- February 5, 2024:
  - Democratic senator Mike McGuire (2nd–Healdsburg) replaces senator Toni Atkins (39th–San Diego) as president pro tempore of the Senate.
  - Democratic senator Lena Gonzalez (33rd–Long Beach) replaces senator McGuire as Senate majority leader.

=== Party changes ===
- August 8, 2024: Democratic senator Marie Alvarado-Gil (4th-Jackson) switches to the Republican Party.

== Legislation ==
Notable topics discussed by legislators included local journalism support (California Journalism Preservation Act) and regulation of AI (Safe and Secure Innovation for Frontier Artificial Intelligence Models Act).

The following bills were signed or vetoed by Governor Gavin Newsom in 2023 or 2024.

=== Signed ===
- SB4 - streamlines affordable housing on lands owned by faith-based organizations and institutions of higher education
- SB684 - requires cities to ministerially allow property owners to subdivide multifamily lots to create subdivisions with up to 10 houses, townhouses or condos in multi-family-zoned areas.
- AB418 - California Food Safety Act, prohibits red dye 3, propylparaben, brominated vegetable oil and potassium bromate from all foods meant for human consumption
- SB261 - requires large companies to biennially report their financial risks from climate change
- SB253 - U.S. corporations earning more than $1 billion and doing business in California must annually report their global emissions of carbon dioxide and other planet-warming greenhouse gases
- SB385 - allow trained physician assistants to conduct surgical abortions without direct supervision by a physician
- SB487 - prohibit health insurers and the state from penalizing medical providers who have been sanctioned in other states for performing procedures that are otherwise legal in California, including abortion and gender-affirming care
- AB1228 - raises the minimum wage for workers to $20 an hour next April, and creates a Fast Food Council composed of industry, worker, and government representatives to set minimum wage, safety, and employment and training standards for workers in large fast food chains and their franchises
- AB969 - would limit the use of hand counting of ballots in most elections
- SB616 - increases the number of paid sick days employers must provide to workers from three to five
- AB1373 - would authorize the state Department of Water Resources the authority to procure clean power when needed under the state Public Utilities Commission, particularly from offshore wind, geothermal and long duration storage
- AB1 - would allow state legislative staff to unionize beginning in 2026
- SB497 - would require state courts and the state Labor Commission to assume employers are illegally retaliating if they take certain disciplinary actions against a worker who in the prior 90 days has made a wage claim or a complaint about unequal pay.
- AB12 - limits the amount that landlords can require in security deposits to one month's rent, rather than the previous two months’ rent
- AB1418 - would prohibit counties and cities from requiring landlords to evict people when a household member is a convicted felon
- SB389 - authorize the State Water Board to investigate and seek verification of all water rights claims regarding California's water bodies, no matter how old
- SB43 - expands the legal definition of “gravely disabled” to make it easier to place someone into involuntary treatment
- AB1955 - allows educators discretion in informing parents of a child's LGBTQ+ identity, but bars disclosure being a requirement.
- AB1078 - prohibits school boards from banning or censoring textbooks or school library books which describe racial or LGBTQ+ issues

=== Vetoed ===
- AB957 - would require judges to consider a parent's affirmation of their child's gender identity in custody disputes
- SB403 - would add caste as a form of prohibited ancestry discrimination
- SB799 - workers who have been on strike for at least two weeks could receive funds
- AB469 - would create a state-funded, governor-appointed ombudsperson's office to review state agencies’ denials of public records requests
- SB58 - would decriminalize certain psychedelic drugs, including psilocybin and psilocin, mescaline (except peyote) and DMT

== State Senate ==
↓
32	8
Democratic	Republican

=== Officers ===
Position	Name	Party	District
Lieutenant Governor	Eleni Kounalakis	Democratic	
President pro tempore	Mike McGuire	Democratic	2nd–Healdsburg
Majority leader	Lena Gonzalez	Democratic	33rd-Long Beach
Assistant majority leader	Angelique Ashby	Democratic	8th-Sacramento
Assistant majority leader	Aisha Wahab	Democratic	10th-Hayward
Democratic Caucus Chair	Monique Limón	Democratic	19th–Santa Barbara
Majority whip	Dave Cortese	Democratic	15th–Los Gatos
Assistant majority whips	Maria Elena Durazo	Democratic	24th–Los Angeles
Assistant majority whips	Steve Padilla	Democratic	18th–Chula Vista
Minority leader	Brian Jones	Republican	40th–Santee
Secretary	Erika Contreras		
Sergeant-at-Arms	Katrina Rodriguez		
Chaplain	Sister Michelle Gorman, RSM		

The Secretary, the Sergeant-at-Arms, and the chaplain are not members of the Legislature.

=== Members ===
District	Name	Party	Residence	Term-limited?	Notes
1	Brian Dahle	Republican	Bieber	Yes	
2	Mike McGuire	Democratic	Healdsburg		Majority leader until February 5, 2024; president pro tempore since February 5, 2024
3	Bill Dodd	Democratic	Napa	Yes	
4	Marie Alvarado-Gil	Republican	Jackson		First elected as a Democrat before switching parties on August 8, 2024
5	Susan Eggman	Democratic	Stockton	Yes	
6	Roger Niello	Republican	Fair Oaks		
7	Steve Glazer	Democratic	Orinda	Yes	
8	Angelique Ashby	Democratic	Sacramento		
8	Nancy Skinner	Democratic	Berkeley	Yes	
10	Aisha Wahab	Democratic	Hayward		
11	Scott Wiener	Democratic	San Francisco		
12	Shannon Grove	Republican	Bakersfield		
13	Josh Becker	Democratic	Menlo Park		
14	Anna Caballero	Democratic	Merced		
15	Dave Cortese	Democratic	San Jose		
16	Melissa Hurtado	Democratic	Bakersfield		
17	John Laird	Democratic	Santa Cruz		
18	Steve Padilla	Democratic	Chula Vista		
19	Monique Limón	Democratic	Santa Barbara		
20	Caroline Menjivar	Democratic	Los Angeles		
21	Scott Wilk	Republican	Santa Clarita	Yes	
22	Susan Rubio	Democratic	Baldwin Park		
23	Rosilicie Ochoa Bogh	Republican	Yucaipa		
24	Ben Allen	Democratic	Santa Monica		
25	Anthony Portantino	Democratic	Burbank	Yes	
26	María Elena Durazo	Democratic	Los Angeles		
27	Henry Stern	Democratic	Malibu		
28	Lola Smallwood-Cuevas	Democratic	Los Angeles		
29	Josh Newman	Democratic	Fullerton		
30	Bob Archuleta	Democratic	Pico Rivera		
31	Richard Roth	Democratic	Riverside	Yes	
32	Kelly Seyarto	Republican	Murrieta		
33	Lena Gonzalez	Democratic	Long Beach		Majority leader since February 5, 2024
34	Tom Umberg	Democratic	Santa Ana		
35	Steven Bradford	Democratic	Gardena	Yes	
36	Janet Nguyen	Republican	Huntington Beach		
37	Dave Min	Democratic	Irvine		
38	Catherine Blakespear	Democratic	Encinitas		
39	Toni Atkins	Democratic	San Diego	Yes	President pro tempore until February 5, 2024
40	Brian Jones	Republican	Santee		Minority leader

== See also ==
- List of California state legislatures
