= California's 21st district =

California's 21st district may refer to:

- California's 21st congressional district
- California's 21st State Assembly district
- California's 21st State Senate district
