= California's 31st district =

California's 31st district may refer to:

- California's 31st congressional district
- California's 31st State Assembly district
- California's 31st State Senate district
