= California's 15th district =

California's 15th district may refer to:

- California's 15th congressional district
- California's 15th State Assembly district
- California's 15th State Senate district
