= 2008 California State Senate election =

- November 4, 2008

20 seats from odd-numbered districts in the California State Senate 21 seats needed for a majority
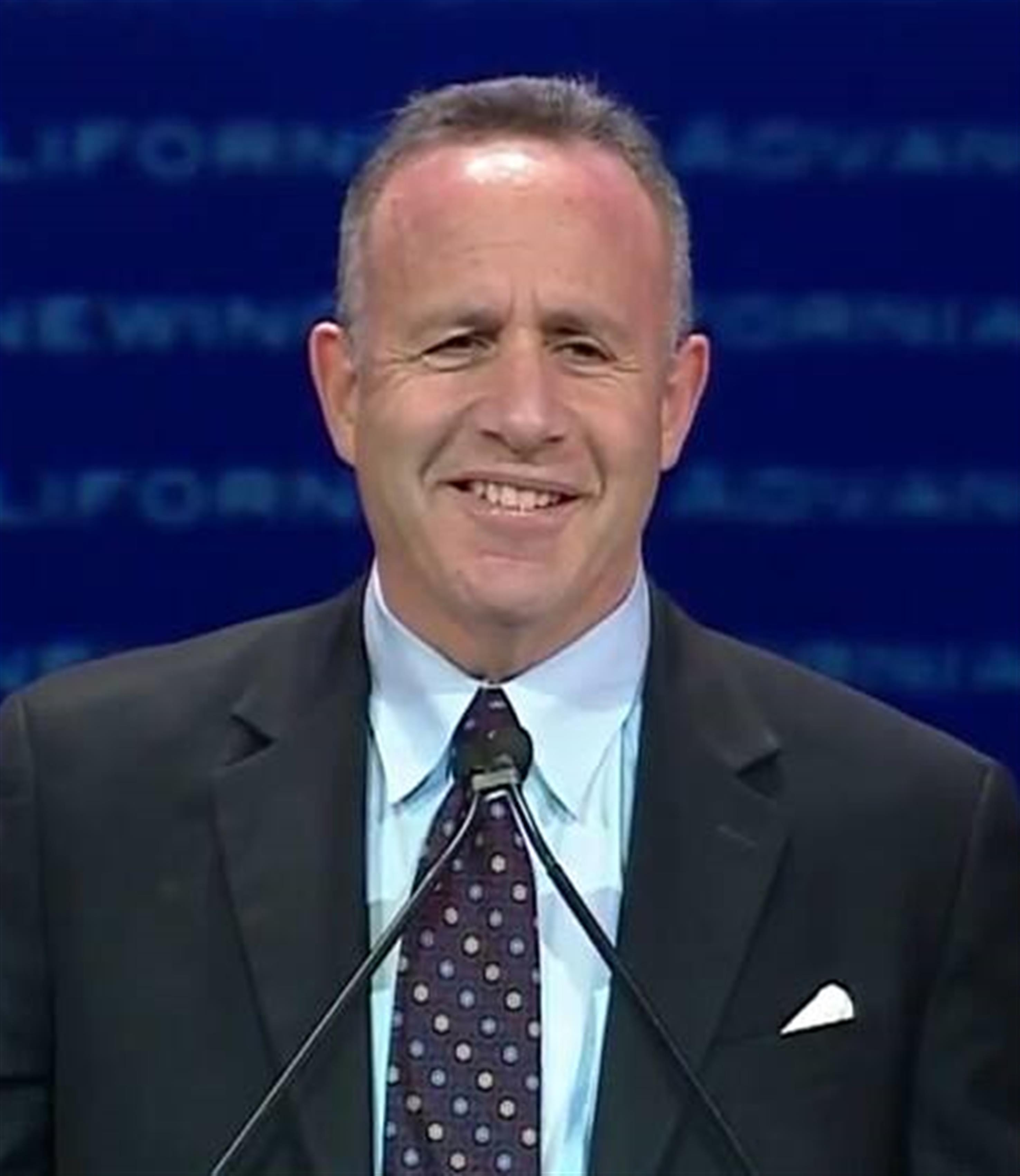

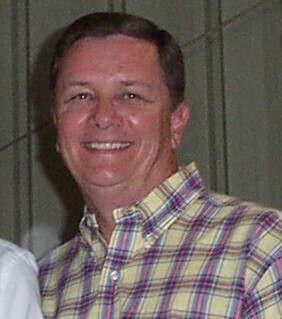
	Majority party	Minority party
Leader	Darrell Steinberg	Dave Cogdill
Party	Democratic	Republican
Leader's seat	6th–Sacramento	14th–Modesto
Seats before	25	15
Seats after	25	15
Seat change	Steady	Steady
Popular vote	3,786,204	2,837,361
Percentage	55.06%	41.27%
- Results: Democratic hold Republican hold No election held
President pro tempore before election
Darrell Steinberg
Democratic
Elected President pro tempore
Darrell Steinberg
Democratic

The 2008 California State Senate elections took place on November 4, 2008. Voters in California's odd-numbered State Senate districts, a total of 20, voted for their state senators. No seats changed parties and the Democratic Party maintained its 25-seat majority, while the Republican Party held 15 seats. Other elections also took place in California on November 4.

Only a single State Senate district, the 19th, was considered truly competitive by political analysts.

== Overview ==
California State Senate elections, 2008
Party	Votes	Percentage	Seats up	Seats not up	Total seats	+/–
Democratic	3,786,204	55.06%	11	14	25	0
Republican	2,837,361	41.27%	9	6	15	0
Independent	131,248	1.91%	0	0	0	0
Libertarian	94,132	1.37%	0	0	0	0
Peace and Freedom	26,996	0.39%	0	0	0	0
Totals	6,875,941	100.00%	20	20	40	—
Voter turnout	72.60%					

2007–2008 State Senate	2009–2010 State Senate
Color Key: / = Democratic / = Republican; Pre-election Democratic: 25; Republican: 15; Total: 40 Contested: 20 Democratic uncontested: 14; Republican uncontested: 6 Total: 40 Post-election Democratic: 25; Republican: 15; Total: 40

== Predictions ==
Source	Ranking	As of
Stateline	Safe D	October 15, 2008

== Results ==
The following candidates are the official results from the California Secretary of State.

=== District 1 ===
California's 1st State Senate district election, 2008
Party	Candidate	Votes	%
Republican	Dave Cox (incumbent)	267,426	62.27
Democratic	Anselmo Chavez	162,044	37.73
Total votes		429,470	100.00
Turnout			75.31
Republican hold			

=== District 3 ===
California's 3rd State Senate district election, 2008
Party	Candidate	Votes	%
Democratic	Mark Leno	326,755	80.21
Republican	Sashi McEntee	80,617	19.79
Total votes		407,372	100.00
Turnout			78.08
Democratic hold			

=== District 5 ===
California's 5th State Senate district election, 2008
Party	Candidate	Votes	%
Democratic	Lois Wolk	207,108	64.54
Republican	Greg Aghazarian	113,778	35.46
Total votes		320,886	100.00
Turnout			73.54
Democratic hold			

=== District 7 ===
California's 7th State Senate district election, 2008
Party	Candidate	Votes	%
Democratic	Mark DeSaulnier	256,311	66.54
Republican	Christian Amsberry	128,878	33.46
Total votes		385,189	100.00
Turnout			78.22
Democratic hold			

=== District 9 ===
California's 9th State Senate district election, 2008
Party	Candidate	Votes	%
Democratic	Loni Hancock	272,225	77.22
Republican	Claudia Bermudez	53,299	15.12
Peace and Freedom	Marsha Feinland	26,996	7.66
Total votes		352,520	100.00
Turnout			70.50
Democratic hold			

=== District 11 ===
California's 11th State Senate district election, 2008
Party	Candidate	Votes	%
Democratic	Joe Simitian (incumbent)	272,154	74.82
Republican	Blair Nathan	91,592	25.18
Total votes		363,746	100.00
Turnout			76.37
Democratic hold			

=== District 13 ===
California's 13th State Senate district election, 2008
Party	Candidate	Votes	%
Democratic	Elaine Alquist (incumbent)	179,855	70.94
Republican	Shane Connolly	57,033	22.49
Libertarian	John Webster	16,659	6.57
Total votes		253,547	100.00
Turnout			75.24
Democratic hold			

=== District 15 ===
California's 15th State Senate district election, 2008
Party	Candidate	Votes	%
Republican	Abel Maldonado (incumbent)	222,617	62.91
Independent	Jim Fitzgerald	131,229	37.09
Total votes		353,846	100.00
Turnout			74.71
Republican hold			

=== District 17 ===
California's 17th State Senate district election, 2008
Party	Candidate	Votes	%
Republican	George Runner (incumbent)	182,295	54.85
Democratic	Bruce McFarland	150,060	45.15
Total votes		332,355	100.00
Turnout			70.90
Republican hold			

=== District 19 ===
California's 19th State Senate district election, 2008
Party	Candidate	Votes	%
Republican	Tony Strickland	207,976	50.10
Democratic	Hannah-Beth Jackson	207,119	49.90
Independent	Peter Diederich (write-in)	14	0.00
Total votes		415,109	100.00
Turnout			78.94
Republican hold			

=== District 21 ===
California's 21st State Senate district election, 2008
Party	Candidate	Votes	%
Democratic	Carol Liu	204,737	66.88
Republican	Teddy Choi	77,525	25.33
Libertarian	Steve Myers	23,842	7.79
Total votes		306,104	100.00
Turnout			69.81
Democratic hold			

=== District 23 ===
California's 23rd State Senate district election, 2008
Party	Candidate	Votes	%
Democratic	Fran Pavley	238,172	67.40
Republican	Rick Montaine	96,274	27.25
Libertarian	Colin Goldman	18,906	5.35
Total votes		353,352	100.00
Turnout			70.91
Democratic hold			

=== District 25 ===
California's 25th State Senate district election, 2008
Party	Candidate	Votes	%
Democratic	Roderick Wright	179,654	71.90
Republican	Lydia Gutierrez	70,199	28.10
Total votes		249,853	100.00
Turnout			66.73
Democratic hold			

=== District 27 ===
California's 27th State Senate district election, 2008
Party	Candidate	Votes	%
Democratic	Alan Lowenthal (incumbent)	171,668	67.34
Republican	Allen Wood	83,268	32.66
Total votes		254,936	100.00
Turnout			67.36
Democratic hold			

=== District 29 ===
California's 29th State Senate district election, 2008
Party	Candidate	Votes	%
Republican	Bob Huff	178,155	54.37
Democratic	Joseph Lyons	127,536	38.92
Libertarian	Jill Stone	21,983	6.71
Total votes		327,674	100.00
Turnout			69.66
Republican hold			

=== District 31 ===
California's 31st State Senate district election, 2008
Party	Candidate	Votes	%
Republican	Robert Dutton (incumbent)	186,191	58.70
Democratic	Ameenah Fuller	130,973	41.29
Independent	Denise Sternberg (write-in)	5	0.00
Total votes		317,169	100.00
Turnout			70.43
Republican hold			

=== District 33 ===
California's 33rd State Senate district election, 2008
Party	Candidate	Votes	%
Republican	Mimi Walters	219,068	58.11
Democratic	Gary Pritchard	157,945	41.89
Total votes		377,013	100.00
Turnout			69.46
Republican hold			

=== District 35 ===
California's 35th State Senate district election, 2008
Party	Candidate	Votes	%
Republican	Tom Harman (incumbent)	222,149	58.55
Democratic	Ginny Meyer	157,271	41.45
Total votes		379,420	100.00
Turnout			67.73
Republican hold			

=== District 37 ===
California's 37th State Senate district election, 2008
Party	Candidate	Votes	%
Republican	John Benoit	190,415	54.79
Democratic	Arthur Guerrero	157,142	45.21
Total votes		347,557	100.00
Turnout			72.48
Republican hold			

=== District 39 ===
California's 39th State Senate district election, 2008
Party	Candidate	Votes	%
Democratic	Christine Kehoe (incumbent)	227,475	65.21
Republican	Jeff Perwin	108,606	31.13
Libertarian	Jesse Thomas	12,742	3.65
Total votes		348,823	100.00
Turnout			73.39
Democratic hold			
