= California's 33rd district =

California's 33rd district may refer to:

- California's 33rd congressional district
- California's 33rd State Assembly district
- California's 33rd State Senate district
