= California's 37th district =

California's 37th district may refer to:

- California's 37th congressional district
- California's 37th State Assembly district
- California's 37th State Senate district
