= 2004 California State Senate election =

- November 2, 2004

20 seats from odd-numbered districts in the California State Senate 21 seats needed for a majority
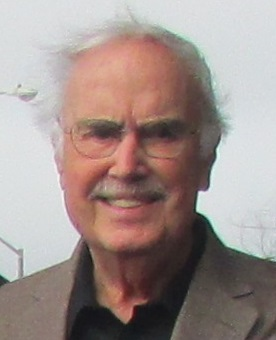

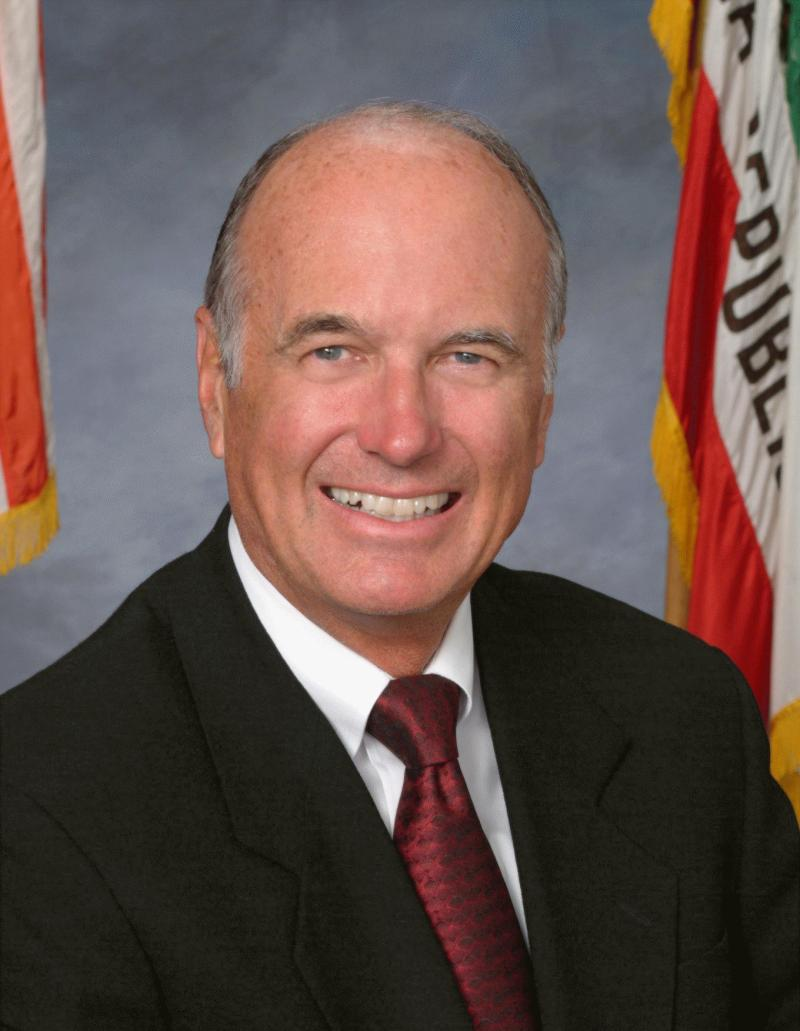
	Majority party	Minority party
Leader	John Burton	Dick Ackerman
Party	Democratic	Republican
Leader's seat	3rd–San Francisco	33rd–Irvine
Last election	25	15
Seats won	25	15
Seat change	Steady	Steady
Popular vote	3,419,002	2,702,511
Percentage	53.78%	42.51%
- Results: Democratic hold Republican hold No election held
President pro tempore before election
John L. Burton
Democratic
Elected President pro tempore
Don Perata
Democratic

The 2004 California State Senate elections were held on November 2, 2004. Senate seats of odd-numbered districts were up for election. Senate terms are staggered so that half the membership is elected every two years. Senators serve four-year terms and are limited to two terms. As was expected, the Democratic Party held on to the majority of the seats.

== Overview ==
California State Senate elections, 2004
Party	Votes	Percentage	Not up	Incumbents	Open	Before	After
Democratic	3,419,002	53.78%	14	6	5	25	25
Republican	2,702,511	42.51%	6	4	5	15	15
Libertarian	201,249	3.17%	0	0	0	0	0
Peace and Freedom	17,412	0.27%	0	0	0	0	0
Green	16,644	0.26%	0	0	0	0	0
Totals	6,356,818	100.00%	20	10	10	40	40

== Predictions ==
Source	Ranking	As of
Rothenberg	Safe D	October 1, 2004

== Results ==
Final results from the California Secretary of State:

=== District 1 ===
California's 1st State Senate district election, 2004
Party	Candidate	Votes	%
Republican	Dave Cox	261,607	62.83
Democratic	Kristine Lang McDonald	141,462	33.98
Libertarian	Roberto Leibman	13,292	3.19
Total votes		416,361	100.00
Republican hold			

=== District 3 ===
California's 3rd State Senate district election, 2004
Party	Candidate	Votes	%
Democratic	Carole Migden	258,166	70.40
Republican	Andrew D. Felder	98,332	26.81
Libertarian	David Rhodes	10,234	2.79
Total votes		366,732	100.00
Democratic hold			

=== District 5 ===
California's 5th State Senate district election, 2004
Party	Candidate	Votes	%
Democratic	Michael Machado (incumbent)	154,519	52.19
Republican	Gary A. Podesto	141,539	47.81
Total votes		296,058	100.00
Democratic hold			

=== District 7 ===
California's 7th State Senate district election, 2004
Party	Candidate	Votes	%
Democratic	Tom Torlakson (incumbent)	282,714	100.00
Democratic hold			

=== District 9 ===
California's 9th State Senate district election, 2004
Party	Candidate	Votes	%
Democratic	Don Perata (incumbent)	248,614	77.09
Republican	Patricia Deutsche	50,110	15.54
Peace and Freedom	Tom Condit	17,412	5.40
Libertarian	Peter Von Pinnon	6,383	1.98
Total votes		322,519	100.00
Democratic hold			

=== District 11 ===
California's 11th State Senate district election, 2004
Party	Candidate	Votes	%
Democratic	Joe Simitian	230,484	66.53
Republican	Jon Zellhoefer	101,887	29.41
Libertarian	Allen M. Rice	14,080	4.06
Total votes		346,451	100.00
Democratic hold			

=== District 13 ===
California's 13th State Senate district election, 2004
Party	Candidate	Votes	%
Democratic	Elaine Alquist	156,321	68.53
Republican	Shane Patrick Connolly	62,157	27.25
Libertarian	Michael Laursen	9,585	4.20
Libertarian	John H. Webster (write-in)	28	0.01
Total votes		228,091	100.00
Democratic hold			

=== District 15 ===
California's 15th State Senate district election, 2004
Party	Candidate	Votes	%
Republican	Abel Maldonado	194,674	52.78
Democratic	Peg Pinard	157,556	42.71
Green	Brook Madsen	16,644	4.51
Total votes		368,874	100.00
Republican hold			

=== District 17 ===
California's 17th State Senate district election, 2004
Party	Candidate	Votes	%
Republican	George Runner	179,992	59.70
Democratic	Jonathan Daniel Kraut	109,037	36.16
Libertarian	John S. Ballard	12,479	4.14
Total votes		301,508	100.00
Republican hold			

=== District 19 ===
California's 19th Senate District election, 2004
Party	Candidate	Votes	%
Republican	Tom McClintock (incumbent)	233,365	60.70
Democratic	Paul Graber	151,085	39.30
Total votes		384,450	100.00
Republican hold			

=== District 21 ===
California's 21st State Senate district election, 2004
Party	Candidate	Votes	%
Democratic	Jack Scott (incumbent)	217,515	78.05
Libertarian	Bob New	61,160	21.95
Total votes		278,675	100.00
Democratic hold			

=== District 23 ===
California's 23rd State Senate district election, 2004
Party	Candidate	Votes	%
Democratic	Sheila Kuehl (incumbent)	229,321	65.68
Republican	Leonard Michael Lanzi	101,648	29.11
Libertarian	Colin Goldman	18,168	5.20
Total votes		349,137	100.00
Democratic hold			

=== District 25 ===
California's 25th State Senate district election, 2004
Party	Candidate	Votes	%
Democratic	Edward Vincent (incumbent)	165,479	73.66
Republican	James Arlandus Spencer	52,485	23.36
Libertarian	Dale F. Ogden	6,683	2.97
Total votes		224,647	100.00
Democratic hold			

=== District 27 ===
California's 27th State Senate district election, 2004
Party	Candidate	Votes	%
Democratic	Alan Lowenthal	150,289	63.25
Republican	Cesar Navarro Castellanos	87,319	36.75
Total votes		237,608	100.00
Democratic hold			

=== District 29 ===
California's 29th Senate District election, 2004
Party	Candidate	Votes	%
Republican	Bob Margett (incumbent)	190,165	61.63
Democratic	Rufino Bautista, Jr.	101,350	32.85
Libertarian	Dan Fernandes	17,044	5.52
Total votes		308,559	100.00
Republican hold			

=== District 31 ===
California's 31st State Senate district election, 2004
Party	Candidate	Votes	%
Republican	Robert Dutton	170,900	59.50
Democratic	Marjorie Mikels	116,312	40.50
Total votes		287,212	100.00
Republican hold			

=== District 33 ===
California's 33rd State Senate district election, 2004
Party	Candidate	Votes	%
Republican	Dick Ackerman (incumbent)	245,116	68.96
Democratic	Randall Daugherty	110,313	31.04
Total votes		355,429	100.00
Republican hold			

=== District 35 ===
California's 35th State Senate district election, 2004
Party	Candidate	Votes	%
Republican	John Campbell	230,220	63.79
Democratic	Rita B. Siebert	114,126	31.62
Libertarian	Timothy Johnson	16,561	4.59
Total votes		360,907	100.00
Republican hold			

=== District 37 ===
California's 37th State Senate district election, 2004
Party	Candidate	Votes	%
Republican	Jim Battin (incumbent)	182,578	59.63
Democratic	Pat Johansen	123,602	40.37
Total votes		306,180	100.00
Republican hold			

=== District 39 ===
California's 39th Senate District election, 2004
Party	Candidate	Votes	%
Democratic	Christine Kehoe	200,737	59.97
Republican	Larry Stirling	118,417	35.38
Libertarian	John Murphy	15,552	4.65
Total votes		334,706	100.00
Democratic hold			

== See also ==
- California State Assembly
- California State Assembly elections, 2004
- California state elections, 2004
- California State Legislature
- California State Senate Districts
- Districts in California
- Political party strength in U.S. states
- Political party strength in California
