= Len Lanzi =

American non-profit executive (born 1962)

- Born: Leonard Michael Lanzi; 1962 (age 63–64); Warwick, Rhode Island, US
- Occupation: Non-profit executive
- Spouse: Russell Nelson

Leonard Lanzi (born 1962) is a former executive with the Los Padres Council of the Boy Scouts of America known for his high-profile dismissal from the organization because he came out as a gay man. He is the subject of the short documentary film Scout's Oath. Lanzi has been a candidate for public office and a successful venture capitalist. Lanzi is an active Rotarian and is active in the LGBT community.

== Life ==
Lanzi was born in Warwick, Rhode Island. He became an Eagle Scout, and is a graduate of the University of Rochester. Up to 2000, he had spent his entire professional life working as a Scout Executive with the Boy Scouts of America, first in the San Francisco Bay Area and then San Diego, before moving to Santa Barbara. He was fired after coming out as gay in a public speech to the Santa Barbara County Board of Supervisors. On October 17, 2000, when speaking against a Santa Barbara County Board of Supervisors proposal to remove funding from the Scouts because the organization excludes gays, he said, "I am gay". Lanzi disclosed this because he felt obliged to follow his Scout's honor and tell the truth. Said Lanzi, "A Scout has to have integrity... and I could not speak up here without feeling hypocritical." He then embraced the twelve attributes of the Scout Law: "I am trustworthy, loyal, helpful, friendly, courteous, kind, obedient, cheerful, thrifty, brave, clean and reverent."

Soon after his public announcement his commission was revoked, and he was dismissed as the council's Scout Executive by its board, at the behest of the BSA National Office. Lanzi's dismissal occurred in the aftermath of Boy Scouts of America v. Dale, a decision which allowed the BSA to determine membership standards. At the time, Lanzi was the highest-placed executive in the organization to have been fired over his sexual orientation.

Lanzi immediately started working heading other non-profits in Santa Barbara County. He settled a lawsuit, filed against the council, that alleged "breach of contract, defamation, employment discrimination, emotional distress and wrongful termination".

Having been a member of the Log Cabin Republicans since the early 1990s, Lanzi became active in politics, becoming the Republican nominee for the California's 23rd State Senate district in the 2004 election.

From 2008 to 2020, Lanzi headed the Los Angeles Venture Association, and is the current managing director of the Preccelerator Program in Santa Monica. He now lives in Santa Monica with his partner, Russell Nelson.

Still working in non-profit management, Lanzi is still active with the Log Cabin Republicans, Rotary, and a number of LGBT organizations.

== Scout's Oath ==
Scout's Oath title card

Scout's Oath is a short documentary film focusing on the story of Lanzi, written and directed by Ryan Rambach. It documents the impact of coming out as a gay man while working for the Boy Scouts of America. The film is a personal exposé piece. It was funded by Kickstarter and filmed in Southern California by Rambach as his senior thesis at Occidental College.

The film premiered at the OUTrageous! Santa Barbara LGBTQ Film Festival, and was shown at a number of film festivals including the:

- Appalachian Queer Film Festival
- Highway 61 Film Festival
- Queer West Film Festival
- Santa Fe Film Festival
- Sedona International Film Festival

In 2015, it made its Canadian premiere, and in 2019 it made its European premiere when it was included as part of the Respect Human Rights Film Festival in Belfast.

Reviewer Michel F. Paré, of the Queer West Film Festival, said from a historical aspect this is still an important documentary to be seen.
