= 2000 California State Senate election =

- November 7, 2000

20 seats from odd-numbered districts in the California State Senate 21 seats needed for a majority
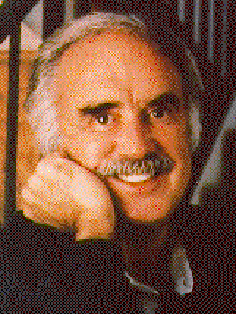

	Majority party	Minority party
Leader	John Burton	Jim Brulte
Party	Democratic	Republican
Leader's seat	3rd–San Francisco	31st–Rancho Cucamonga
Seats before	25	15
Seats after	26	14
Seat change	▲1	▼1
Popular vote	2,936,160	2,564,155
Percentage	51.29%	44.80%
Swing	▼5.2pp	▲4.02pp
- Results: Democratic gain Democratic hold Republican hold No election held
President pro tempore before election
John L. Burton
Democratic
President pro tempore-designate
John L. Burton
Democratic

The 2000 California State Senate elections were held on November 7, 2000. Senate seats of odd-numbered districts were up for election. Senate terms are staggered so that half the membership is elected every two years. Senators serve four-year terms and are limited to two terms. The Democratic Party held on to the majority of the seats, gaining one seat in the process.

== Overview ==
California State Senate elections, 2000
Party	Votes	Percentage	Not up	Incumbents	Open	Before	After	+/–
Democratic	2,936,160	51.29%	15	6	4	25	26	+1
Republican	2,564,155	44.80%	5	5	5	15	14	-1
Libertarian	162,285	2.84%	0	0	0	0	0	0
Natural Law	61,528	1.07%	0	0	0	0	0	0
Invalid or blank votes	395,547	6.46%	—	—	—	—	—	—
Totals	6,119,765	100.00%	20	11	9	40	40	—

== Results ==
Final results from the California Secretary of State:

=== District 1 ===
California's 1st State Senate district election, 2000
Party	Candidate	Votes	%
Republican	Rico Oller	220,427	57.78
Democratic	Thomas A. Romero	144,997	38.01
Libertarian	John Petersen	16,075	4.21
Invalid or blank votes		10,679	2.72
Total votes		392,178	100.00
Republican hold			

=== District 3 ===
California's 3rd State Senate district election, 2000
Party	Candidate	Votes	%
Democratic	John L. Burton (incumbent)	238,372	72.92
Republican	Terence Faulkner	71,256	21.80
Natural Law	Celeste Joy Blau Joki	17,277	5.29
Invalid or blank votes		12,784	3.76
Total votes		339,689	100.00
Democratic hold			

=== District 5 ===
California's 5th State Senate district election, 2000
Party	Candidate	Votes	%
Democratic	Michael Machado	142,392	48.06
Republican	Alan Nakanishi	141,013	47.59
Libertarian	Carole Brow	10,208	3.45
Natural Law	William S. Nicolas	2,667	0.90
Invalid or blank votes		5,260	1.74
Total votes		301,540	100.00
Democratic hold			

=== District 7 ===
California's 7th State Senate district election, 2000
Party	Candidate	Votes	%
Democratic	Tom Torlakson	197,683	54.44
Republican	Richard Rainey (incumbent)	156,107	42.99
Natural Law	Mark F. Billings	9,334	2.57
Invalid or blank votes		16,333	4.30
Total votes		379,457	100.00
Democratic gain from Republican			

=== District 9 ===
California's 9th State Senate district election, 2000
Party	Candidate	Votes	%
Democratic	Don Perata (incumbent)	218,550	83.34
Republican	Linda J. Marshall	30,062	11.46
Libertarian	James M. Eyer	13,622	5.19
Invalid or blank votes		28,662	9.85
Total votes		290,896	100.00
Democratic hold			

=== District 11 ===
California's 11th State Senate district election, 2000
Party	Candidate	Votes	%
Democratic	Byron Sher (incumbent)	183,887	59.25
Republican	Gloria S. Hom	113,770	36.66
Libertarian	John J. "Jack" Hickey	12,676	4.08
Invalid or blank votes		20,916	6.31
Total votes		331,249	100.00
Democratic hold			

=== District 13 ===
California's 13th State Senate district election, 2000
Party	Candidate	Votes	%
Democratic	John Vasconcellos (incumbent)	140,827	68.56
Republican	John Longwell	54,076	26.33
Libertarian	John Harvey Webster	10,507	5.12
Invalid or blank votes		20,128	8.92
Total votes		225,538	100.00
Democratic hold			

=== District 15 ===
California's 15th State Senate district election, 2000
Party	Candidate	Votes	%
Republican	Bruce McPherson (incumbent)	155,039	55.21
Democratic	Anselmo A. Chavez	112,942	40.22
Natural Law	David Rosenkranz	6,425	2.29
Libertarian	Gordon D. Sachtjen	6,394	2.28
Invalid or blank votes		18,112	6.06
Total votes		298,912	100.00
Republican hold			

=== District 17 ===
California's 17th State Senate district election, 2000
Party	Candidate	Votes	%
Republican	William J. Knight (incumbent)	172,723	64.36
Democratic	Richard Lott	84,427	31.46
Libertarian	John R. Gibson	7,667	2.86
Natural Law	Douglas R. Wallack	3,543	1.32
Invalid or blank votes		10,416	3.74
Total votes		278,776	100.00
Republican hold			

=== District 19 ===
California's 19th State Senate district election, 2000
Party	Candidate	Votes	%
Republican	Tom McClintock	165,422	57.58
Democratic	Daniel R. Gonzalez	121,893	42.42
Invalid or blank votes		23,203	7.47
Total votes		310,518	100.00
Republican hold			

=== District 21 ===
California's 21st State Senate district election, 2000
Party	Candidate	Votes	%
Democratic	Jack Scott	158,145	58.91
Republican	Paul Zee	100,901	37.59
Libertarian	Bob New	9,399	3.50
Invalid or blank votes		23,047	7.91
Total votes		291,492	100.00
Democratic hold			

=== District 23 ===
California's 23rd State Senate district election, 2000
Party	Candidate	Votes	%
Democratic	Sheila Kuehl	225,736	70.59
Republican	Daniel B. Rego	79,009	24.71
Libertarian	Charles T. Black	15,059	4.71
Invalid or blank votes		36,099	10.14
Total votes		355,903	100.00
Democratic hold			

=== District 25 ===
California's 25th State Senate district election, 2000
Party	Candidate	Votes	%
Democratic	Edward Vincent	131,725	82.28
Republican	James Arlandus Spencer	28,375	17.72
Invalid or blank votes		17,112	9.66
Total votes		177,212	100.00
Democratic hold			

=== District 27 ===
California's 27th State Senate district election, 2000
Party	Candidate	Votes	%
Democratic	Betty Karnette (incumbent)	157,577	60.90
Republican	Marilyn Lyon	101,170	39.10
Invalid or blank votes		23,113	8.20
Total votes		281,860	100.00
Democratic hold			

=== District 29 ===
California's 29th State Senate district election, 2000
Party	Candidate	Votes	%
Republican	Bob Margett	128,713	49.06
Democratic	Richard Melendez	125,975	48.02
Libertarian	Leland Faegre	7,655	2.92
Invalid or blank votes		21,612	7.61
Total votes		283,955	100.00
Republican hold			

=== District 31 ===
California's 31st State Senate district election, 2000
Party	Candidate	Votes	%
Republican	Jim Brulte (incumbent)	153,745	58.79
Democratic	Michael D. Rayburn	97,931	37.45
Libertarian	Fritz R. Ward	9,851	3.77
Invalid or blank votes		0	0.00
Total votes		261,527	100.00
Republican hold			

=== District 33 ===
California's 33rd State Senate district election, 2000
Party	Candidate	Votes	%
Republican	Dick Ackerman	212,705	65.65
Democratic	Jack L. Roberts	94,176	29.07
Libertarian	Michael E. Chacon	11,708	3.61
Natural Law	William H. Verkamp	5,391	1.66
Invalid or blank votes		30,647	8.64
Total votes		354,627	100.00
Republican hold			

=== District 35 ===
California's 35th State Senate district election, 2000
Party	Candidate	Votes	%
Republican	Ross Johnson (incumbent)	189,523	60.06
Democratic	Stephen M. Ray	103,700	32.86
Libertarian	Paul L. Studier	11,401	3.61
Natural Law	Cynthia F. Katz	10,918	3.46
Invalid or blank votes		33,207	9.52
Total votes		348,749	100.00
Republican hold			

=== District 37 ===
California's 37th State Senate district election, 2000
Party	Candidate	Votes	%
Republican	Jim Battin	177,665	62.18
Democratic	Sedalia L. Sanders	94,391	33.04
Libertarian	Donna Tello	13,649	4.78
Invalid or blank votes		23,380	7.56
Total votes		309,085	100.00
Republican hold			

=== District 39 ===
California's 39th State Senate district election, 2000
Party	Candidate	Votes	%
Democratic	Dede Alpert (incumbent)	160,834	56.29
Republican	Larry Stirling	112,454	39.36
Libertarian	Roger A. Nichols	6,474	2.27
Natural Law	Stuart Knoles	5,973	2.09
Invalid or blank votes		20,837	6.80
Total votes		316,572	100.00
Democratic hold			

== See also ==
- California State Assembly
- California State Assembly elections, 2000
- California state elections, 2000
- California State Legislature
- California State Senate Districts
- Districts in California
- Political party strength in U.S. states
- Political party strength in California
