= 1996 California State Senate election =

- November 5, 1996

20 seats from odd-numbered districts in the California State Senate 21 seats needed for a majority
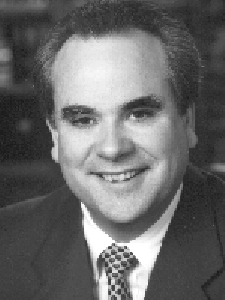

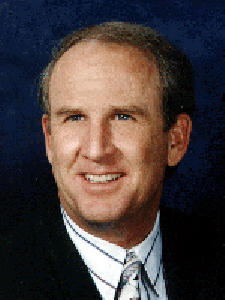
	Majority party	Minority party
Leader	Bill Lockyer	Rob Hurtt
Party	Democratic	Republican
Leader's seat	10th–Hayward	34th–Garden Grove
Seats before	21	17
Seats after	23	16
Seat change	▲2	▼1
Popular vote	2,599,659	2,521,858
Percentage	49.32%	47.85%
- Results: Democratic gain Republican gain Democratic hold Republican hold No election held
President pro tempore before election
Bill Lockyer
Democratic
President pro tempore-designate
Bill Lockyer
Democratic

The 1996 California State Senate elections were held on November 5, 1996. Senate seats of odd-numbered districts were up for election. Senate terms are staggered so that half the membership is elected every two years. Senators serve four-year terms and are limited to two terms. Democrats expanded their majority, gaining two seats, one from the Republicans and one from an Independent.

== Overview ==
California State Senate elections, 1996
Party	Votes	Percentage	Not up	Incumbents	Open	Before	After	+/–
Democratic	2,599,659	49.32%	14	3	4	21	23	+2
Republican	2,521,858	47.85%	5	6	6	17	16	-1
Libertarian	62,525	1.19%	0	0	0	0	0	0
Natural Law	50,359	0.96%	0	0	0	0	0	0
Reform	33,913	0.64%	0	0	0	0	0	0
Peace and Freedom	20,601	0.39%	0	0	0	0	0	0
Green	12,089	0.23%	0	0	0	0	0	0
Write-ins	55	0.00%	0	0	0	0	0	0
Independent	0	0.00%	1	0	1	2	1	-1
Invalid or blank votes	400,098	7.06%	—	—	—	—	—	—
Totals	5,670,635	100.00%	20	9	11	40	40	—

== Composition ==
Pre-election	Seats
Democratic-held	21
Republican-held	17
Independent-held	2
Total	40

1996 Elections	Seats
Republican held and uncontested	11
Democratic held and uncontested	8
Independent-held and uncontested	1
Contested	20
Total	40

State Senate: post-election	Seats
Democratic-held	23
Republican-held	16
Independent-held	1
Total	40

== Results ==
Final results from the California Secretary of State:

=== District 1 ===
California's 1st State Senate district election, 1996
Party	Candidate	Votes	%
Republican	Tim Leslie (incumbent)	215,931	63.14
Democratic	Thomas "Tom" Romero	125,894	36.84
No party	Lamar Norton Latimer (write-in)	55	0.02
Invalid or blank votes		19,850	5.49
Total votes		361,730	100.00
Republican hold			

=== District 3 ===
California's 3rd State Senate district election, 1996
Party	Candidate	Votes	%
Democratic	John L. Burton	215,831	70.82
Republican	Curtis Rau	72,097	23.68
Libertarian	Donald E. Harte	16,819	5.52
Invalid or blank votes		37,018	10.83
Total votes		304,747	100.00
Democratic hold			

=== District 5 ===
California's 5th State Senate district election, 1996
Party	Candidate	Votes	%
Democratic	Patrick Johnston (incumbent)	159,932	60.12
Republican	Kurt C. Boese	108,075	39.88
Invalid or blank votes		12,981	4.65
Total votes		280,988	100.00
Democratic hold			

=== District 7 ===
California's 7th State Senate district election, 1996
Party	Candidate	Votes	%
Republican	Richard Rainey	161,291	48.01
Democratic	Jeff Smith	160,632	47.61
Reform	William John Knudeon	7,077	2.11
Natural Law	Mark F. Billings	6,975	2.08
Invalid or blank votes		12,476	3.58
Total votes		348,451	100.00
Republican gain from Democratic			

=== District 9 ===
California's 9th State Senate district election, 1996
Party	Candidate	Votes	%
Democratic	Barbara Lee	196,430	78.23
Republican	Thomas N. Hudson	37,341	14.87
Peace and Freedom	Robert J. Evans	8,870	3.53
Natural Law	Carol Flyer Prettie	8,465	3.37
Invalid or blank votes		22,120	8.10
Total votes		273,226	100.00
Democratic hold			

=== District 11 ===
California's 11th State Senate district election, 1996
Party	Candidate	Votes	%
Democratic	Byron Sher	177,155	57.90
Republican	Patrick Shannon	117,547	38.42
Libertarian	Jon W. Malonia	11,290	3.69
Invalid or blank votes		24,355	7.37
Total votes		276,347	100.0
Democratic gain from Republican			

=== District 13 ===
California's 13th State Senate district election, 1996
Party	Candidate	Votes	%
Democratic	John Vasconcellos	117,640	58.59
Republican	Ray Morton	55,737	27.76
Reform	Dominic L. Cortese	17,715	6.82
Libertarian	John Harvey Webster	6,684	3.32
Natural Law	Rick J. Dunstan	3,021	1.60
Invalid or blank votes		19,222	8.74
Total votes		220,019	100.00
Democratic hold			

=== District 15 ===
California's 15th State Senate district election, 1996
Party	Candidate	Votes	%
Republican	Bruce McPherson	124,448	47.18
Democratic	Rusty Areias	120,846	45.82
Green	E. Craig Coffin	12,089	4.56
Natural Law	Scott R. Hartley	6,377	2.42
Invalid or blank votes		11,400	4.14
Total votes		275,160	100.00
Republican gain from Democratic			

=== District 17 ===
California's 17th State Senate district election, 1996
Party	Candidate	Votes	%
Republican	William J. Knight	163,531	66.61
Democratic	Steven A. Figueroa	61,962	33.39
Invalid or blank votes		17,880	6.79
Total votes		243,373	100.00
Republican hold			

=== District 19 ===
California's 19th State Senate district election, 1996
Party	Candidate	Votes	%
Republican	Cathie Wright (incumbent)	160,130	62.24
Democratic	John Birke	97,133	37.76
Invalid or blank votes		17,032	6.21
Total votes		274,295	100.00
Republican hold			

=== District 21 ===
California's 21st State Senate district election, 1996
Party	Candidate	Votes	%
Democratic	Adam Schiff	125,649	51.78
Republican	Paula L. Boland	107,039	44.11
Libertarian	Bob New	9,981	4.11
Invalid or blank votes		19,207	7.39
Total votes		261,876	100.00
Democratic gain from Republican			

=== District 23 ===
California's 23rd State Senate district election, 1996
Party	Candidate	Votes	%
Democratic	Tom Hayden (incumbent)	172,295	56.20
Republican	Scott L. Schreiber	101,876	34.41
Peace and Freedom	Shirley Rachel Isaacson	11,731	3.96
Libertarian	Charles T. Black	7,438	2.51
Natural Law	Robert P. Swanson	2,722	0.92
Invalid or blank votes		28,592	5.61
Total votes		324,654	100.00
Democratic hold			

=== District 25 ===
California's 25th State Senate district election, 1996
Party	Candidate	Votes	%
Democratic	Teresa P. Hughes (incumbent)	118,806	82.02
Republican	Cliff McClain	28,038	17.98
Invalid or blank votes		17,971	11.04
Total votes		164,815	100.00
Democratic hold			

=== District 27 ===
California's 27th State Senate district election, 1996
Party	Candidate	Votes	%
Democratic	Betty Karnette	126,562	51.41
Republican	Phil Hawkins	119,641	48.59
Invalid or blank votes		19,200	7.23
Total votes		265,403	100.00
Democratic gain from Republican			

=== District 29 ===
California's 29th State Senate district election, 1996
Party	Candidate	Votes	%
Republican	Dick Mountjoy (incumbent)	138,944	58.93
Democratic	Tommy Randle	96,829	41.07
Invalid or blank votes		23,795	9.17
Total votes		259,568	100.00
Republican hold			

=== District 31 ===
California's 31st State Senate district election, 1996
Party	Candidate	Votes	%
Republican	Jim Brulte	143,537	56.17
Democratic	Gary George	103,217	41.83
Invalid or blank votes		17,795	6.73
Total votes		264,549	100.00
Republican hold			

=== District 33 ===
California's 33rd State Senate district election, 1996
Party	Candidate	Votes	%
Republican	John Lewis (incumbent)	199,173	68.84
Democratic	David Robert Heywood	91,011	31.36
Invalid or blank votes		19,466	6.29
Total votes		309,650	100.00
Republican hold			

=== District 35 ===
California's 35th State Senate district election, 1996
Party	Candidate	Votes	%
Republican	Ross Johnson (incumbent)	183,739	61.52
Democratic	Madolene Arakeljian	103,170	34.54
Natural Law	Nat Adam	11,780	3.94
Invalid or blank votes		20,812	6.51
Total votes		319,501	100.00
Republican hold			

=== District 37 ===
California's 37th State Senate district election, 1996
Party	Candidate	Votes	%
Republican	David G. Kelley (incumbent)	157,090	61.14
Democratic	Hans Alfred Schroeder	75,943	29.59
Libertarian	Donna Tello	10,313	4.01
Reform	George Angell	9,121	3.55
Natural Law	Jim J. Moner	4,486	1.75
Invalid or blank votes		23,024	6.22
Total votes		279,977	100.00
Republican hold			

=== District 39 ===
California's 39th State Senate district election, 1996
Party	Candidate	Votes	%
Democratic	Dede Alpert	142,722	51.36
Republican	Joe Dolphin	126,653	45.57
Natural Law	Stuart Knoles	6,533	3.07
Invalid or blank votes		15,902	5.41
Total votes		291,810	100.00
Democratic gain from Independent			

== See also ==
- California State Assembly
- California State Assembly elections, 1996
- California state elections, 1996
- California State Legislature
- California State Senate Districts
- Districts in California
- Political party strength in U.S. states
- Political party strength in California
