= Lena Gonzalez =

American politician (born 1981)

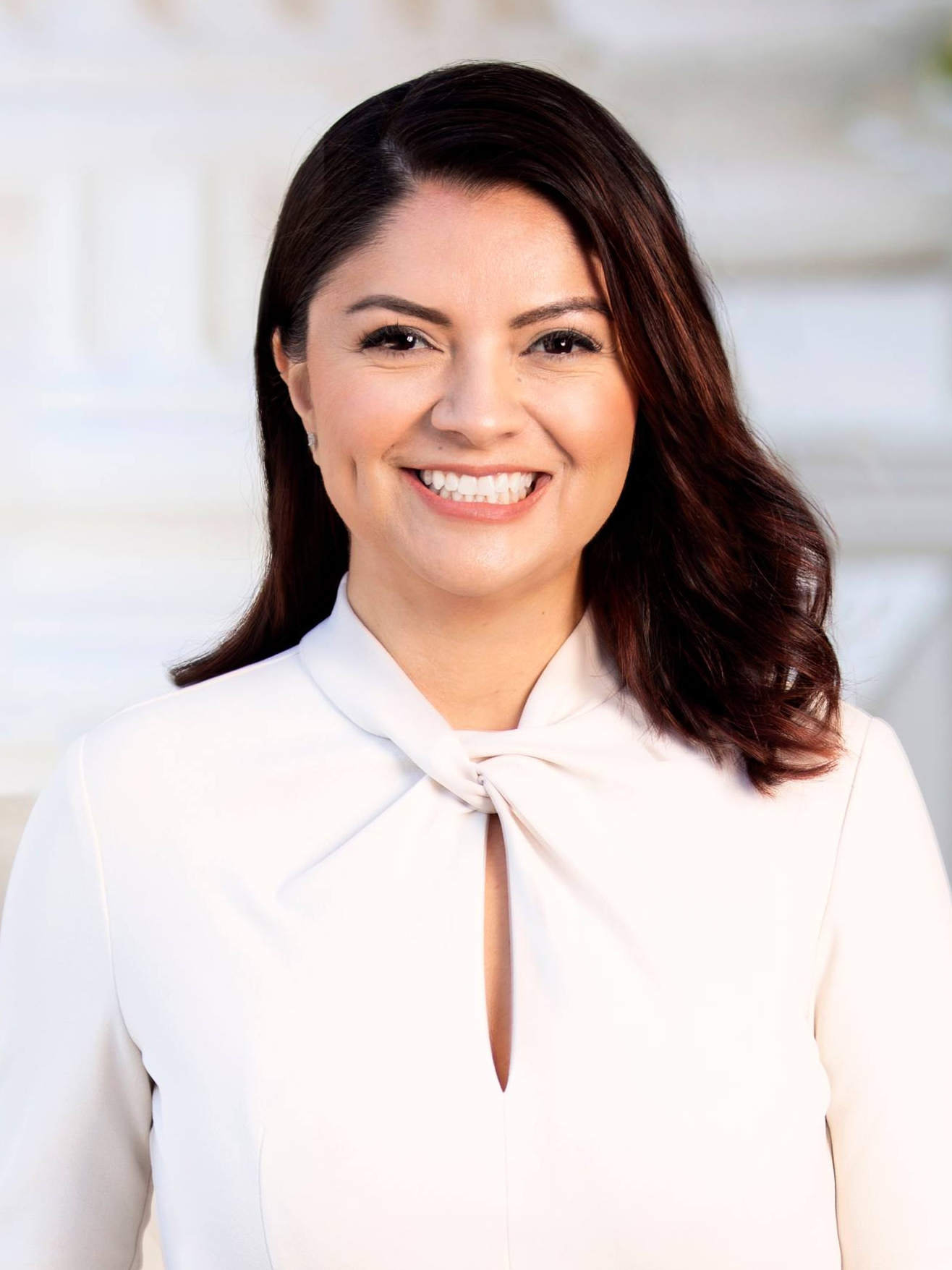

Majority Leader of the California Senate
- In office February 8, 2024 – December 23, 2025
- Preceded by: Mike McGuire
- Succeeded by: Angelique Ashby

Member of the California Senate from the 33rd district
- Incumbent
- Assumed office June 12, 2019
- Preceded by: Ricardo Lara

Member of the Long Beach City Council from the 1st district
- In office July 15, 2014 – June 12, 2019
- Preceded by: Robert Garcia
- Succeeded by: Mary Zendejas

Personal details
- Born: January 26, 1981 (age 45) Torrance, California, U.S.
- Party: Democratic
- Spouse: Adam Carrillo (m. 2021)
- Children: 3
- Education: California State University, Long Beach (BA); Loyola Marymount University (MBA)

Lena Adriana Gonzalez (born January 26, 1981) is an American politician serving as a member of the California State Senate from the 33rd district, which encompasses the Southeast Los Angeles area including Lakewood and Long Beach. From February 2024 to December 2025, she served as Majority Leader of the Senate.

== Early life and education ==
Gonzalez was born in Torrance, California, the daughter of immigrants from Aguascalientes, Mexico. Her father worked as a cargo truck driver and her mother worked in the aerospace technology industry. She holds a Bachelor of Arts in political science from California State University, Long Beach and a Master of Business Administration from Loyola Marymount University.

== Career ==
Gonzalez previously worked for Microsoft as a corporate affairs manager in charge of the company's philanthropy and civic engagement.

She served on the Long Beach City Council from 2014 to 2019, representing District 1 in Downtown Long Beach. Prior to this, she worked for then-Councilman Robert Garcia.

== California State Senate ==
Gonzalez was first elected to the California State Senate in a June 2019 special election to succeed Ricardo Lara, who was elected California Insurance Commissioner.

She chaired the Senate Transportation Committee, becoming the first Latina to ever serve in this capacity and the only woman to serve in the last 20 years. On February 12, 2021, Senator Gonzalez was appointed as Majority Whip. She was one of several California lawmakers to attend the COP15 Summit.

She was appointed Majority Leader of the Senate in 2024, succeeding President Pro Tem Mike McGuire.

=== Legislation ===
Governor Gavin Newsom signed Gonzalez's “The Equal Insurance HIV Act” into law, which prohibits life and disability income insurance companies from denying coverage to HIV-positive individuals solely based on their HIV status.

Gonzalez has been a frequent critic of the 'Big Oil' lobby in California, authoring numerous bills protecting environmental standards and public health. She introduced legislation in 2022 to require CalPERS and CalSTRS to engage in fossil fuel divestment to align with the state's climate action goals. Governor Gavin Newsom signed a bill by Gonzalez that would ban new oil and gas wells near homes and schools in 2022. Gonzalez introduced Senate Joint Resolution 2 alongside Assemblyman Ash Kalra, which upon adoption made California the largest economy endorsing the Fossil Fuel Non-Proliferation Treaty Initiative Continuing this trend, she authored a bill in 2026 which would preserve and enhance safety rules for oil refineries, which can sometimes face dangerous explosions.

== Personal life ==
Gonzalez lives in Long Beach with husband Adam Carillo and three sons in a blended family. The pair met playing softball and were married in a 2019 ceremony at the new Long Beach City Hall building.

== Electoral history ==
2019 California State Senate 33rd district special election
Primary election
Party	Candidate	Votes	%
Democratic	Lena Gonzalez	10,984	31.6
Republican	Jack M. Guerrero	4,860	14.0
Democratic	Ali Saleh	3,334	9.6
Democratic	Ana Maria Quintana	3,038	8.8
Democratic	José Luis Solache	2,594	7.5
Democratic	Denise Diaz	2,404	6.9
Republican	Martha Flores Gibson	2,225	6.4
Democratic	Leticia Vasquez Wilson	1,839	5.3
Democratic	Al Austin, II	1,356	3.9
Democratic	Thomas Jefferson Cares	824	2.4
Democratic	Chris Garcia	720	2.1
Green	Cesar Flores	529	1.5
Total votes		34,711	100.0
General election
Democratic	Lena Gonzalez	32,394	69.8
Republican	Jack M. Guerrero	14,049	30.2
Total votes		46,443	100.0
Democratic hold			

2020 California State Senate 33rd district election
Primary election
Party	Candidate	Votes	%
Democratic	Lena Gonzalez (incumbent)	109,428	99.8
Democratic	Elizabeth C. Castillo (write-in)	205	0.2
Total votes		109,633	100.0
General election
Democratic	Lena Gonzalez (incumbent)	164,752	61.8
Democratic	Elizabeth C. Castillo	101,831	38.2
Total votes		266,583	100.0
Democratic hold			

2024 California State Senate 33rd district election
Primary election
Party	Candidate	Votes	%
Democratic	Lena Gonzalez (incumbent)	86,226	68.6
Republican	Mario Paz	21,470	17.1
Republican	Sharifah A. Hardie	18,061	14.4
Total votes		125,757	100.0
General election
Democratic	Lena Gonzalez (incumbent)	217,560	69.9
Republican	Mario Paz	93,574	30.1
Total votes		311,134	100.0
Democratic hold			

California Senate
Preceded by Mike McGuire	Majority Leader of the California Senate; February 2024–December 2025	Succeeded by Angelique Ashby
