= California's 35th senatorial district =

American legislative district

California's 35th State Senate district
Current senator
Laura Richardson; D–Long Beach
- Population (2010) • Voting age • Citizen voting age: 934,615; 676,116; 481,429
- Demographics: 11.41% White; 21.31% Black; 52.97% Latino; 11.95% Asian; 0.31% Native American; 0.94% Hawaiian/Pacific Islander; 0.31% other; 0.79% remainder of multiracial
- Registered voters: 521,337
- Registration: 58.15% Democratic; 12.39% Republican; 24.04% No party preference

California's 35th senatorial district is one of 40 California State Senate districts. It is currently represented by Democrat Laura Richardson of Long Beach.

== District profile ==
The district straddles Interstate 110, including the inland portions of the South Bay in addition to parts of South Los Angeles. The district stretches from Inglewood and Watts in the north down to San Pedro and the Port of Los Angeles in the south.

Los Angeles County – 9.5%

- Carson
- Compton
- Gardena
- Hawthorne
- Inglewood – 87.3%
- Lawndale
- Long Beach – 7.6%
- Los Angeles – 6.2%
  - San Pedro
  - Watts
- Torrance – 45.0%

== Election results from statewide races ==
Year	Office	Results
2020	President	Biden 76.3 – 21.5%
2018	Governor	Newsom 78.5 – 21.5%
2018	Senator	Feinstein 60.0 – 40.0%
2016	President	Clinton 79.3 – 15.8%
2016	Senator	Harris 63.0 – 37.0%
2014	Governor	Brown 75.2 – 24.8%
2012	President	Obama 80.3 – 17.9%
2012	Senator	Feinstein 80.8 – 19.2%

== List of senators representing the district ==
Due to redistricting, the 35th district has been moved around different parts of the state. The current iteration resulted from the 2021 redistricting by the California Citizens Redistricting Commission.

Senators	Party	Years served	Electoral history	Counties represented
B. V. Sargent (Monterey)	Democratic	January 3, 1887 – January 7, 1889	Elected in 1886. [data missing]	Monterey, San Benito
Thomas Flint Jr. (Hollister)	Republican	January 7, 1889 – January 2, 1893	Elected in 1888. Redistricted to the 33rd district.	Monterey, San Benito
Orestes Orr (Ventura)	Republican	January 2, 1893 – January 4, 1897	Elected in 1892. [data missing]	Santa Barbara, Ventura
J. J. Boyce (Santa Barbara)	Republican	January 4, 1897 – January 1, 1901	Elected in 1896. [data missing]	Santa Barbara, Ventura
Charles B. Greenwell (Santa Barbara)	Republican	January 1, 1901 – January 2, 1905	Elected in 1900. Redistricted to the 33rd district.	Santa Barbara, Ventura
Howard A. Broughton (Los Angeles)	Republican	January 2, 1905 – January 4, 1909	Elected in 1904. [data missing]	Los Angeles
Newton W. Thompson (Alhambra)	Republican	January 4, 1909 – January 8, 1917	Elected in 1908. Re-elected in 1912. [data missing]	Los Angeles
Egbert J. Gates (Pasadena)	Republican	January 8, 1917 – January 5, 1925	Elected in 1916. Re-elected in 1920. [data missing]	Los Angeles
Herbert J. Evans (Monrovia)	Republican	January 5, 1925 – January 2, 1933	Elected in 1924. Re-elected in 1928. Retired to run for State Assembly.	Los Angeles
Nelson T. Edwards (Orange)	Republican	January 2, 1933 – January 4, 1937	Redistricted from the 39th district and re-elected in 1932. [data missing]	Orange
Harry C. Westover (Laguna Hills)	Democratic	January 4, 1937 – January 6, 1941	Elected in 1936. [data missing]	Orange
Thomas Kuchel (Anaheim)	Republican	January 6, 1941 – February 11, 1946	Elected in 1940. Re-elected in 1944. Resigned to become California State Controller.	Orange
Vacant		February 11, 1946 – January 6, 1947		Orange
Clyde A. Watson (Orange)	Republican	January 6, 1947 – January 5, 1953	Elected in 1946. Re-elected in 1950. [data missing]	Orange
John A. Murdy Jr. (Newport Beach)	Republican	January 5, 1953 – January 4, 1965	Elected in 1952. Re-elected in 1956. Re-elected in 1960. [data missing]	Orange
John G. Schmitz (Santa Ana)	Republican	January 4, 1965 – January 2, 1967	Elected in 1964. Redistricted to the 34th district.	Orange
James E. Whetmore (Dana Point)	Republican	January 2, 1967 – November 30, 1976	Elected in 1966. Re-elected in 1968. Re-elected in 1972.	Los Angeles, Orange
John Briggs (Fullerton)	Republican	December 6, 1976 – December 28, 1981	Elected in 1976. Re-elected in 1980. Resigned.	Orange
Vacant		December 28, 1981 – April 26, 1982		Orange
John Seymour (Anaheim)	Republican	April 26, 1982 – January 7, 1991	Elected to finish Briggs's term. Re-elected in 1984. Re-elected in 1988. Resigned after appointment to the U.S. Senate.	Orange
Vacant		January 7, 1991 – May 16, 1991		Orange
John Lewis (Orange)	Republican	May 16, 1991 – November 30, 1992	Elected to finish Seymour's term. Redistricted to the 33rd district.	Orange
Marian Bergeson (Newport Beach)	Republican	December 7, 1992 – January 2, 1995	Redistricted from the 37th district and re-elected in 1992. Resigned after appointment as Superintendent of Public; Instruction failed in Assembly.	Orange
Vacant		January 2, 1995 – May 11, 1995		Orange
Ross Johnson (Fullerton)	Republican	May 11, 1995 – November 30, 2004	Elected to finish Bergeson's term. Re-elected in 1996. Re-elected in 2000. Term-limited and retired.	Orange
John Campbell (Irvine)	Republican	December 6, 2004 – December 6, 2005	Elected in 2004. Resigned after election to the U.S. House of Representatives.	Orange
Vacant		December 6, 2005 – June 12, 2006		Orange
Tom Harman (Huntington Beach)	Republican	June 12, 2006 – November 30, 2012	Elected to finish Campbell in 2006. Re-elected in 2008. Term-limited and retired.	Orange
Roderick Wright (Inglewood)	Democratic	December 3, 2012 – September 22, 2014	Redistricted from the 25th district and re-elected in 2012. Resigned after being indicted on voter fraud.	Los Angeles
Vacant		September 22, 2014 – December 10, 2014		Los Angeles
Isadore Hall III (Compton)	Democratic	December 10, 2014 – November 30, 2016	Elected to finish Wright's term. Retired to run for U.S. House of Representatives.	Los Angeles
Steven Bradford (Gardena)	Democratic	December 5, 2016 – November 30, 2024	Elected in 2016. Re-elected in 2020. Term-limited and retired.	Los Angeles
Laura Richardson (Long Beach)	Democratic	December 2, 2024 – present	Elected in 2024.	Los Angeles

== Election results (1990-present) ==
=== 2024 ===
2024 California State Senate 35th district election
Primary election
Party	Candidate	Votes	%
Democratic	Laura Richardson	26,916	27.8
Democratic	Michelle Chambers	23,670	24.5
Republican	James Spencer	18,193	18.8
Democratic	Albert Robles	8,263	8.5
Democratic	Alex Monteiro	5,840	6.0
Democratic	Jennifer Trichelle-Marie Williams	5,242	5.4
Democratic	Nilo Vega Michelin	4,628	4.8
Democratic	Lamar Lyons	3,959	4.1
Total votes		96,711	100.0
General election
Democratic	Laura Richardson	122,862	50.6
Democratic	Michelle Chambers	120,144	49.4
Total votes		243,006	100.0
Democratic hold			

=== 2020 ===
2020 California State Senate 35th district election
Primary election
Party	Candidate	Votes	%
Democratic	Steven Bradford (incumbent)	106,742	75.7
American Independent	Anthony Perry	34,253	24.3
Total votes		140,995	100.0
General election
Democratic	Steven Bradford (incumbent)	234,881	72.5
American Independent	Anthony Perry	89,080	27.5
Total votes		323,961	100.0
Democratic hold			

=== 2016 ===
2016 California State Senate 35th district election
Primary election
Party	Candidate	Votes	%
Democratic	Steven Bradford	50,998	35.6
Democratic	Warren Furutani	35,024	24.4
Democratic	Isaac Galvan	32,105	22.4
Republican	Charlotte Ann Svolos	25,197	17.6
Total votes		143,324	100.0
General election
Democratic	Steven Bradford	135,353	53.5
Democratic	Warren Furutani	117,455	46.5
Total votes		252,808	100.0
Democratic hold			

=== 2014 (special) ===
2014 California State Senate 35th district special election Vacancy resulting from the resignation of Rod Wright
Primary election
Party	Candidate	Votes	%
Democratic	Isadore Hall, III	17,951	55.9
Republican	James Spencer	8,014	25.0
Democratic	Louis L. Dominguez	4,067	12.7
Democratic	Hector Serrano	2,069	6.4
Total votes		32,101	100.0
Democratic hold			

=== 2012 ===
2012 California State Senate 35th district election
Primary election
Party	Candidate	Votes	%
Democratic	Roderick Wright (incumbent)	40,312	57.4
Republican	Charlotte A. Svolos	18,793	26.8
Democratic	Paul Butterfield	11,091	15.8
Total votes		70,196	100.0
General election
Democratic	Roderick Wright (incumbent)	192,483	76.5
Republican	Charlotte A. Svolos	59,077	23.5
Total votes		251,560	100.0
Democratic gain from Republican			

=== 2008 ===
2008 California State Senate 35th district election
Party	Candidate	Votes	%
Republican	Tom Harman (incumbent)	222,149	58.5
Democratic	Ginny Meyer	157,271	41.5
Total votes		379,420	100.0
Republican hold			

=== 2005 (special) ===
2005 California State Senate 35th district special election Vacancy resulting from the resignation of John Campbell
Primary election
Party	Candidate	Votes	%
Republican	Tom Harman	37,840	38.8
Republican	Diane Harkey	37,604	38.5
Democratic	Larry Caballero	22,176	22.7
Total votes		97,620	100.0
General election
Republican	Tom Harman	89,408	67.6
Democratic	Larry Caballero	42,838	32.4
Total votes		132,246	100.0
Republican hold			

=== 2004 ===
2004 California State Senate 35th district election
Party	Candidate	Votes	%
Republican	John Campbell	230,220	63.8
Democratic	Rita B. Siebert	114,126	31.6
Libertarian	Timothy Johnson	16,561	4.6
Total votes		360,907	100.0
Republican hold			

=== 2000 ===
2000 California State Senate 35th district election
Party	Candidate	Votes	%
Republican	Ross Johnson (incumbent)	189,523	60.1
Democratic	Stephen M. Ray	103,700	32.9
Libertarian	Paul L. Studier	11,401	3.6
Natural Law	Cynthia F. Katz	10,918	3.5
Total votes		315,542	100.0
Republican hold			

=== 1996 ===
1996 California State Senate 35th district election
Party	Candidate	Votes	%
Republican	Ross Johnson (incumbent)	183,739	61.5
Democratic	Madolene Arakeljian	103,170	34.5
Natural Law	Nat Adam	11,780	3.9
Total votes		298,689	100.0
Republican hold			

=== 1995 (special) ===
1995 California State Senate 35th district special election Vacancy resulting from the resignation of Marian Bergeson
Primary election
Party	Candidate	Votes	%
Republican	Ross Johnson	18,546	31.5
Republican	Gil Ferguson	14,893	25.3
Republican	Doris Allen	13,039	22.1
Democratic	Madelene Arakelian	4,611	7.8
Democratic	Mike Palitz	3,110	5.3
Republican	Robert Ruper	1,767	3.0
Republican	Dan Worthington	1,679	2.8
Republican	Long Pham	1,305	2.2
Total votes		58,950	100.0
General election
Republican	Ross Johnson	33,110	71.6
Democratic	Madelene Arakelian	13,143	28.4
Total votes		46,253	100.0
Republican hold			

=== 1992 ===
1992 California State Senate 35th district election
Party	Candidate	Votes	%
Republican	Marian Bergeson (incumbent)	204,504	62.2
Democratic	Dorianne Garcia	107,512	32.7
Libertarian	Eric Sprik	16,536	5.0
Total votes		328,552	100.0
Republican hold			

=== 1991 (special) ===
1991 California State Senate 35th district special election Vacancy resulting from the resignation of John Seymour
Primary election
Party	Candidate	Votes	%
Republican	John Lewis	13,374	30.0
Republican	Nolan Frizzelle	7,955	17.8
Republican	Doris Allen	7,085	15.9
Republican	Dana Reed	6,079	13.6
Democratic	Francis Hoffman	4,640	10.6
Republican	William A. Dougherty	2,625	5.9
Republican	Charles V. Smith	1,180	2.6
Republican	Jim Wronski	606	1.4
Libertarian	Erik Sprik	535	1.2
Republican	John S. Parise	513	1.2
Total votes		44,595	100.0
General election
Republican	John Lewis	36,706	67.7
Democratic	Francis Hoffman	14,459	26.7
Libertarian	Erik Sprik	3,049	5.6
Total votes		54,214	100.0
Republican hold			

== See also ==
- California State Senate
- California State Senate districts
- Districts in California
