= Tom Harman =

American politician (born 1941)

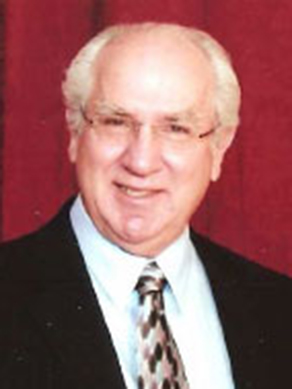
- Harman in 2008

California State Senate Republican Caucus Chair
- In office January 5, 2012 – November 30, 2012
- Preceded by: Bob Huff
- Succeeded by: Ted Gaines

Member of the California Senate from the 35th district
- In office June 12, 2006 – November 30, 2012
- Preceded by: John Campbell
- Succeeded by: Roderick Wright

Member of the California State Assembly from the 67th district
- In office December 4, 2000 – June 12, 2006
- Preceded by: Scott Baugh
- Succeeded by: Jim Silva

Huntington Beach City Councilman
- In office December 5, 1994 – December 4, 2000

Personal details
- Born: Thomas George Harman; May 30, 1941 (age 85) Pasadena, California
- Party: Republican
- Spouse: Dianne Harman
- Children: Michael; Michelle
- Education: Loyola Law School; Kansas State University
- Occupation: Attorney

Military service
- Allegiance: United States
- Branch/service: United States Army
- Years of service: 1963–1965
- Rank: First Lieutenant
- Unit: 4th Infantry Division

Thomas George Harman (born May 30, 1941) is an American politician. He is a former Republican member of the California State Senate who had previously been a three-term member of the California State Assembly. Both seats represent portions of Orange County. From January 5 – November 30, 2012, he served as Senate Republican Caucus Chair, the second-ranking leadership position among Senate Republicans.

== Education and military service ==
Harman earned a Bachelor of Science in Business Administration from Kansas State University in 1963. Upon graduating, Harman joined the United States Army and became a lieutenant in the 4th Infantry Division. After completing his tour of duty, he entered Loyola Law School in Los Angeles, finishing near the top of his class and earning his J.D. in 1968.

== Legal career ==
Upon graduating from Loyola, Harman joined the Long Beach law firm of Lucas & Deukmejian, whose partners were future California Chief Justice Malcolm M. Lucas and future Governor George Deukmejian.

Harman and his wife, Dianne, moved to Huntington Beach in the 1970s to start a family. After the birth of his children, Michael and Michelle, Harman wanted to spend more time with his family, so he left Lucas & Deukmejian and started his own law firm, which he remained with for 27 years.

== Political career ==
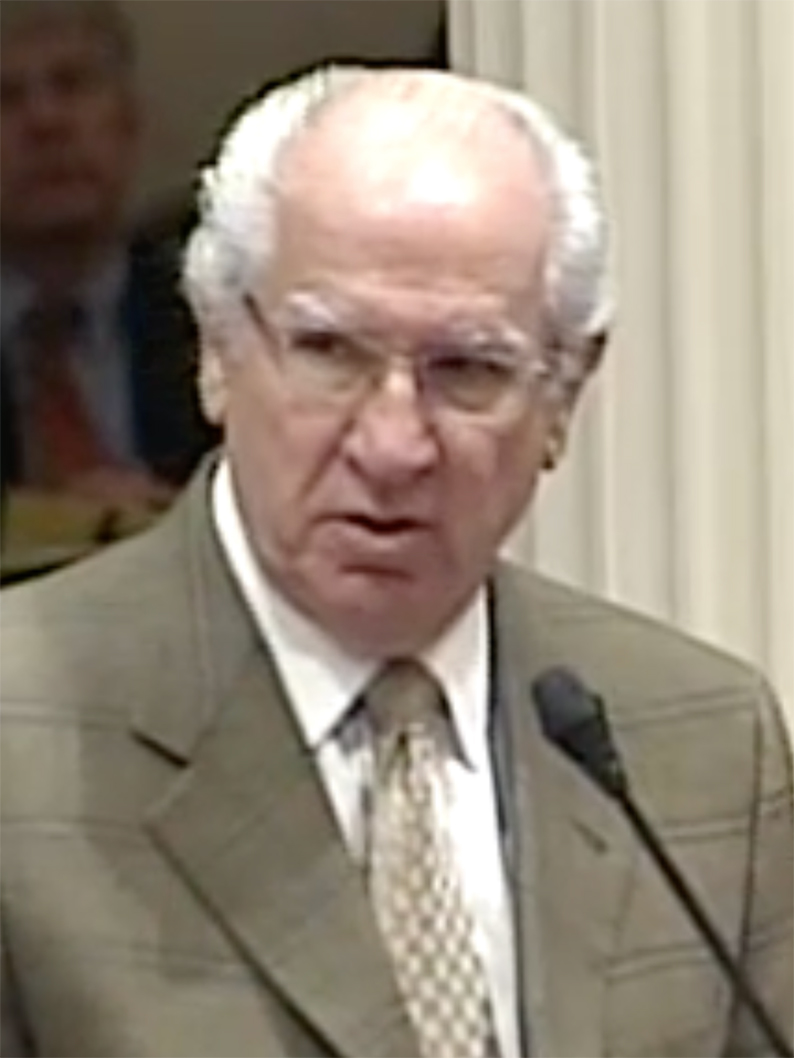
Harman speaking in the California State Senate, 2012.

In 1995, Harman was appointed to fill a vacancy on the Huntington Beach City Council. City residents elected Harman to a full term in 1996. At the conclusion of his term, Harman was elected to the State Assembly with 62% of the vote in 2000 to represent the 67th District. He was re-elected with 69% of the vote in 2002 and 64% of the vote in 2004. He was ineligible to seek a fourth term, due to term limits.

=== Senate special election ===
Harman won a hotly contested special primary election for the 35th district state senate seat in April 2006 to replace Senator John Campbell who had recently been elected to the United States House of Representatives, thereby creating a vacancy for that senate seat. Harman's conservative opponent, Dana Point City Councilwoman Diane Harkey, spent $1.2 million of her own money in an attempt to defeat him. Harman won the special primary election by a margin of only 236 votes. Harman went on to win 67.8% of the special general election vote in June 2006.

=== Senate tenure ===
Harman was re-elected to the 35th Senate district in November 2008. He held the position of whip, the third highest position in the Republican Caucus. In this capacity he was chiefly responsible for ensuring the enforcement of proper procedures and rules on the floor of the Senate. In addition to his leadership position, he served as vice chair of both the Senate Judiciary Committee and the Senate Governmental Organization Committee.

A Sacramento Bee article concluded that Tom Harman had missed or abstained from the highest number of votes of any Senator during the 2010 legislative year who wasn't ill.

=== Bid for Attorney General ===
Harman announced his candidacy for California Attorney General in June 2009. On June 8, 2010, Harman lost the Republican primary to Los Angeles County District Attorney Steve Cooley, who narrowly lost to Democratic candidate Kamala Harris for the general election.

California Assembly
Preceded by Scott Baugh	California State Assemblyman; 67th District; December 4, 2000 – June 12, 2006	Succeeded by Jim Silva
California Senate
Preceded by John Campbell	California State Senator; 35th District; June 12, 2006 – November 30, 2012	Succeeded by Rod Wright
