= California's 25th senatorial district =

American legislative district

California's 25th State Senate district
Current senator
Sasha Renée Pérez; D–Alhambra
- Population (2010) • Voting age • Citizen voting age: 926,935; 735,320; 625,479
- Demographics: 52.19% White; 5.17% Black; 25.97% Latino; 15.19% Asian; 0.43% Native American; 0.20% Hawaiian/Pacific Islander; 0.33% other; 0.52% remainder of multiracial
- Registered voters: 604,271
- Registration: 45.41% Democratic; 24.49% Republican; 24.68% No party preference

California's 25th senatorial district is one of 40 California State Senate districts. It is currently represented by Democrat Sasha Renée Pérez of Alhambra.

== District profile ==
The district encompasses most of the San Gabriel Mountains and its adjacent San Gabriel Valley foothill communities. It stretches from the eastern San Fernando Valley in the west to the far western Inland Empire in the east. Most of the district's population is in the western half of the district, anchored by Glendale and Pasadena.

Los Angeles County – 8.7%

- Alhambra
- Altadena
- Arcadia
- Bradbury
- Claremont
- Glendale
- Glendora
- La Cañada Flintridge
- La Crescenta-Montrose
- La Verne
- Monrovia
- Monterey Park
- Pasadena
- Rosemead
- San Gabriel
- San Marino
- Sierra Madre
- South Pasadena
- Temple City

San Bernardino County – 3.8%

- Upland

== Election results from statewide races ==
Year	Office	Results
2020	President	Biden 63.8 – 34.2%
2018	Governor	Newsom 63.3 – 36.7%
2018	Senator	Feinstein 58.7 – 41.3%
2016	President	Clinton 62.5 – 31.6%
2016	Senator	Harris 62.3 – 37.7%
2014	Governor	Brown 59.6 – 40.4%
2012	President	Obama 59.9 – 37.4%
2012	Senator	Feinstein 62.4 – 37.6%

== List of senators representing the district ==
Due to redistricting, the 25th district has been moved around different parts of the state. The current iteration resulted from the 2021 redistricting by the California Citizens Redistricting Commission.

Senators	Party	Years served	Electoral history	Counties represented
J. Granville Doll (Red Bluff)	Union; Democratic	January 6, 1862 – December 7, 1863	Elected in 1861. Re-elected in 1862. [data missing]	Colusa, Tehama
John A. Rush (Colusa)	Democratic	December 7, 1863 – December 2, 1867	Elected in 1863. Re-elected in 1865. [data missing]	Colusa, Tehama
Edward J. Lewis (Tehama)	Democratic	December 2, 1867 – December 4, 1871	Elected in 1867. Re-elected in 1868. Retired to run for Lieutenant Governor of California.	Colusa, Tehama
John Boggs (Colusa)	Democratic	December 4, 1871 – December 6, 1875	Elected in 1871. Re-elected in 1873. [data missing]	Colusa, Tehama
Stephen L. Spencer (Camptonville)	Republican	December 6, 1875 – December 3, 1877	Elected in 1875. [data missing]	Sutter, Yuba
Jesse O. Goodwin (Marysville)	Republican	December 3, 1877 – January 5, 1880	Elected in 1877. [data missing]	Sutter, Yuba
Edwin A. Davis (Marysville)	Republican	December 3, 1877 – January 8, 1883	Elected in 1879. Re-elected in 1880. [data missing]	Sutter, Yuba
Augustus L. Chandler (Nicolaus)	Republican	January 8, 1883 – January 3, 1887	Elected in 1882. [data missing]	Sutter, Yuba
D. J. McCarthy (San Francisco)	Democratic	January 3, 1887 – January 7, 1889	Elected in 1886. [data missing]	San Francisco
James E. Britt (San Francisco)	Democratic	January 7, 1889 – January 2, 1893	Elected in 1888. [data missing]	San Francisco
John Fay (San Francisco)	Democratic	January 2, 1893 – January 4, 1897	Elected in 1892. [data missing]	San Francisco
John Feeney (San Francisco)	Democratic	January 4, 1897 – January 1, 1901	Elected in 1896. [data missing]	San Francisco
John H. Nelson (San Francisco)	Republican	January 1, 1901 – January 4, 1909	Elected in 1900. Re-elected in 1904. [data missing]	San Francisco
Lester G. Burnett (San Francisco)	Republican	January 4, 1909 – January 6, 1913	Elected in 1908. [data missing]	San Francisco
David W. Mott (Santa Paula)	Republican	January 6, 1913 – January 8, 1917	Elected in 1912. [data missing]	Santa Barbara, Ventura
J. R. Thompson (Santa Barbara)	Democratic	January 8, 1917 – January 3, 1921	Elected in 1916. [data missing]	Santa Barbara, Ventura
F. A. Arbuckle (Santa Barbara)	Republican	January 3, 1921 – January 5, 1925	Elected in 1920. [data missing]	Santa Barbara, Ventura
John J. Hollister Sr. (Gaviota)	Republican	January 5, 1925 – January 7, 1929	Elected in 1924. [data missing]	Santa Barbara, Ventura
Walter H. Duval (Santa Paula)	Republican	January 7, 1929 – January 2, 1933	Elected in 1928. Redistricted to the 33rd district.	Santa Barbara, Ventura
Edward H. Tickle (Monterey)	Republican	January 2, 1933 – January 8, 1945	Elected in 1932. Re-elected in 1936. Re-elected in 1940. [data missing]	Monterey, San Benito
Frederick Weybret (Salinas)	Republican	January 8, 1945 – January 31, 1955	Elected in 1944. Re-elected in 1948. Re-elected in 1952. Died.	Monterey, San Benito
Frederick Weybret (Salinas)	Republican	January 8, 1945 – January 31, 1955	Elected in 1944. Re-elected in 1948. Re-elected in 1952. Died.	Monterey
Vacant		January 31, 1955 – May 23, 1955		Monterey
Fred Farr (Carmel)	Democratic	May 23, 1955 – January 2, 1967	Elected to finish Weybret's term. Re-elected in 1956. Re-elected in 1960. Re-elected in 1964. Redistricted to the 17th district and lost re-election.	Monterey
Robert S. Stevens (Santa Monica)	Republican	January 2, 1967 – November 30, 1976	Elected in 1966. Re-elected in 1968. Re-elected in 1972. Retired to become a judge of the Los Angeles County Superior Court.	Los Angeles
H. L. Richardson (Glendora)	Republican	December 6, 1976 – November 30, 1988	Redistricted from the 19th district and re-elected in 1976. Re-elected in 1980. Re-elected in 1984. Retired.	Los Angeles
H. L. Richardson (Glendora)	Republican	December 6, 1976 – November 30, 1988	Redistricted from the 19th district and re-elected in 1976. Re-elected in 1980. Re-elected in 1984. Retired.	Inyo, Los Angeles, San Bernardino
Bill Leonard (San Bernardino)	Republican	December 5, 1988 – November 30, 1992	Elected in 1988. Redistricted to the 31st district.	Inyo, Los Angeles, San Bernardino
Tessa P. Hughes (Los Angeles)	Democratic	December 7, 1992 – November 30, 2000	Elected in 1992. Re-elected in 1996. Term-limited and retired.	Los Angeles
Edward Vincent (Inglewood)	Democratic	December 4, 2000 – November 4, 2008	Elected in 2000. Re-elected in 2004. Term-limited and retired.	Los Angeles
Vacant		November 4, 2008 – December 1, 2008		Los Angeles
Roderick Wright (Inglewood)	Democratic	December 1, 2008 – November 30, 2012	Elected in 2008. Redistricted to the 35th district.	Los Angeles
Carol Liu (La Cañada Flintridge)	Democratic	December 3, 2012 – November 30, 2016	Redistricted from the 21st district and re-elected in 2012. Term-limited and retired.	Los Angeles, San Bernardino
Anthony Portantino (La Cañada Flintridge)	Democratic	December 5, 2016 – November 30, 2024	Elected in 2016. Re-elected in 2020. Term-limited and ran for U.S. House of Representatives.	Los Angeles, San Bernardino
Sasha Renée; Pérez (Alhambra)	Democratic	December 2, 2024 – present	Elected in 2024.	Los Angeles, San Bernardino

== Election results (1990-present) ==
=== 2024 ===
2024 California State Senate 25th district election
Primary election
Party	Candidate	Votes	%
Republican	Elizabeth Wong Ahlers	73,002	35.7
Democratic	Sasha Renée Pérez	67,266	32.9
Democratic	Yvonne Yiu	35,693	17.5
Democratic	Sandra Armenta	19,486	9.5
Democratic	Teddy Choi	8,881	4.3
Total votes		204,328	100.0
General election
Democratic	Sasha Renée Pérez	243,371	59.6
Republican	Elizabeth Wong Ahlers	164,757	40.4
Total votes		408,128	100.0
Democratic hold			

=== 2020 ===
2020 California State Senate 25th district election
Primary election
Party	Candidate	Votes	%
Democratic	Anthony Portantino (incumbent)	185,405	99.1
Republican	Kathleen Hazelton (write-in)	952	0.5
Libertarian	Evan Wecksell (write-in)	811	0.4
Total votes		187,168	100.0
General election
Democratic	Anthony Portantino (incumbent)	295,432	64.0
Republican	Kathleen Hazelton	166,529	36.0
Total votes		461,961	100.0
Democratic hold			

=== 2016 ===
2016 California State Senate 25th district election
Primary election
Party	Candidate	Votes	%
Republican	Michael D. Antonovich	85,663	39.5
Democratic	Anthony Portantino	58,154	26.8
Democratic	Katherine Perez-Estolano	31,166	14.4
Democratic	Chris Chahinian	14,849	6.8
Democratic	Phlunte' Riddle	14,563	6.7
Democratic	Teddy Choi	12,430	5.7
Total votes		216,825	100.0
General election
Democratic	Anthony Portantino	218,655	57.8
Republican	Michael D. Antonovich	159,014	42.2
Total votes		377,256	100.0
Democratic hold			

=== 2012 ===
2012 California State Senate 25th district election
Primary election
Party	Candidate	Votes	%
Democratic	Carol Liu (incumbent)	62,930	51.3
Republican	Gilbert V. Gonzales	53,093	43.3
Democratic	Ameenah Fuller	6,592	5.4
Total votes		122,615	100.0
General election
Democratic	Carol Liu (incumbent)	213,127	60.8
Republican	Gilbert V. Gonzales	137,651	39.2
Total votes		350,778	100.0
Democratic hold			

=== 2008 ===
2008 California State Senate 25th district election
Party	Candidate	Votes	%
Democratic	Roderick Wright	179,654	71.9
Republican	Lydia Gutierrez	70,199	28.1
Total votes		249,853	100.0
Democratic hold			

=== 2004 ===
2004 California State Senate 25th district election
Party	Candidate	Votes	%
Democratic	Edward Vincent (incumbent)	165,479	73.7
Republican	James Arlandus Spencer	52,485	23.4
Libertarian	Dale F. Ogden	6,683	3.0
Total votes		224,647	100.0
Democratic hold			

=== 2000 ===
2000 California State Senate 25th district election
Party	Candidate	Votes	%
Democratic	Edward Vincent	131,725	82.3
Republican	James Arlandus Spencer	28,375	17.7
Total votes		160,100	100.0
Democratic hold			

=== 1996 ===
1996 California State Senate 25th district election
Party	Candidate	Votes	%
Democratic	Teresa Patterson Hughes (incumbent)	118,806	82.0
Republican	Cliff McClain	28,038	18.0
Total votes		146,844	100.0
Democratic hold			

=== 1992 ===
1992 California State Senate 25th district election
Party	Candidate	Votes	%
Democratic	Teresa Patterson Hughes	125,316	76.8
Republican	Cliff McClain	30,666	18.8
Peace and Freedom	Hattie Marie Benn	7,289	4.5
Total votes		163,271	100.0
Democratic gain from Republican			

== See also ==
- California State Senate
- California State Senate districts
- Districts in California
