= California's 21st senatorial district =

American legislative district

California's 21st State Senate district
Current senator
Monique Limón; D–Santa Barbara
- Population (2020): 1,024,600
- Demographics: 37.92% White; 1.55% Black; 50.45% Latino; 5.58% Asian; 0.33% Native American; 0.16% Hawaiian/Pacific Islander; 0.52% other; 3.49% remainder of multiracial
- Registered voters: 571,184 (2023)
- Registration: 47.02% Democratic; 24.80% Republican; 28.18 (Note: Includes 3.96% registered to the American Independent Party and 0.49% to the California Green Party.)% No party preference

California's 21st senatorial district is one of 40 California State Senate districts. It is currently represented by Democrat Monique Limón of Santa Barbara.

== District profile ==
The district encompasses all of Santa Barbara County and parts of San Luis Obispo and Ventura counties, stretching from Grover Beach in the north down along the Highway 101 corridor to include Santa Maria, Buellton, Solvang, Goleta, Santa Barbara, the Santa Clara River Valley, Oxnard, Port Hueneme and Camarillo on the southeastern border. It also includes four of the Channel Islands, though all are uninhabited.

San Luis Obispo County – 19.93%

- Grover Beach
- Nipomo
- Oceano
- Unincorporated areas of San Luis Obispo County – 34.03%

Santa Barbara County – 100%

- Buellton
- Carpinteria
- Eastern Goleta Valley
- Goleta
- Guadalupe
- Isla Vista
- Lompoc
- Montecito
- Orcutt
- Santa Barbara
- Santa Maria
- Solvang
- University of California-Santa Barbara
- Vandenberg Village
- Unincorporated areas of Santa Barbara County

Ventura County — 61.78%

- Camarillo
- El Rio
- Fillmore
- Mira Monte
- Oak View
- Ojai
- Oxnard
- Port Hueneme
- San Buenaventura
- Santa Paula
- Unincorporated areas of Ventura County — 82.34%

== Election results from statewide races ==
Year	Office	Results
2020	President	Biden 52.0 – 45.8%
2018	Governor	Cox 50.9 – 49.1%
2018	Senator	de Leon 51.6 – 48.4%
2016	President	Clinton 48.6 – 45.7%
2016	Senator	Harris 56.8 – 43.2%
2014	Governor	Kashkari 58.6 – 41.4%
2012	President	Romney 49.9 – 47.5%
2012	Senator	Emken 51.1 – 48.9%

== List of senators representing the district ==
Due to redistricting, the 21st district has been moved around different parts of the state. The current iteration resulted from the 2021 redistricting by the California Citizens Redistricting Commission.

=== 1852–1862 ===
Senators	Party	Years served	Electoral history	Counties represented
M. M. Wombough (Colusa)	Democratic	January 5, 1852 – January 3, 1855	Elected in 1851. Re-elected in 1853. [data missing]	Colusa, Yolo
[data missing]		January 3, 1855 – January 5, 1857	[data missing]	[data missing]
John C. Burch (Weaverville)	Democratic	January 5, 1857 – January 3, 1859	Elected in 1856. Retired to run for U.S. House of Representatives.	Humboldt, Trinity
James T. Ryan (Eureka)	Democratic	January 3, 1859 – January 7, 1861	Elected in 1858. [data missing]	Humboldt, Trinity
Joseph Kutz (North San Juan)	Republican	January 7, 1861 – January 6, 1862	Elected in 1860.	Nevada

=== 1862–1875 ===
Dates	Seat A			Seat B				Seat C			Counties represented
Dates	Member	Party	Electoral history	Member	Party	Electoral history	Member	Party	Electoral history		Counties represented
January 6, 1862 – December 7, 1863	Edmund W. Roberts (Grass Valley)	Union	Elected in 1862. Re-elected in 1863. Re-elected in 1865. Re-elected in 1867. Re-elected in 1868. [data missing]	Joseph Kutz (North San Juan)	Union	Elected in 1862. Re-elected in 1863. Re-elected in 1865. [data missing]	John C. Birdseye (Nevada City)	Union	Elected in 1862. [data missing]	Nevada	
December 7, 1863 – December 4, 1865	Edmund W. Roberts (Grass Valley)	Union	Elected in 1862. Re-elected in 1863. Re-elected in 1865. Re-elected in 1867. Re-elected in 1868. [data missing]	Joseph Kutz (North San Juan)	Union	Elected in 1862. Re-elected in 1863. Re-elected in 1865. [data missing]	Third seat was eliminated for the term.			Nevada	
December 4, 1865 – December 2, 1867	Edmund W. Roberts (Grass Valley)	Union	Elected in 1862. Re-elected in 1863. Re-elected in 1865. Re-elected in 1867. Re-elected in 1868. [data missing]	Joseph Kutz (North San Juan)	Union	Elected in 1862. Re-elected in 1863. Re-elected in 1865. [data missing]	David Belden (Nevada City)	Union	Elected in 1865. [data missing]	Nevada	
December 2, 1867 – December 6, 1869	Edmund W. Roberts (Grass Valley)	Union	Elected in 1862. Re-elected in 1863. Re-elected in 1865. Re-elected in 1867. Re-elected in 1868. [data missing]	Second seat was eliminated for the term.			Third seat was eliminated.			Nevada	
December 6, 1869 – December 4, 1871	Edmund W. Roberts (Grass Valley)	Republican	Elected in 1862. Re-elected in 1863. Re-elected in 1865. Re-elected in 1867. Re-elected in 1868. [data missing]	Miles P. O'Connor (Nevada City)	Democratic	Elected in 1868. [data missing]	Third seat was eliminated.			Nevada	
December 4, 1871 – December 1, 1873	Charles Kent (Nevada City)	Democratic	Elected in 1871. Re-elected in 1873. [data missing]	Second seat was eliminated for the term.			Third seat was eliminated.			Nevada	
December 1, 1873 – December 6, 1875	Charles Kent (Nevada City)	Democratic	Elected in 1871. Re-elected in 1873. [data missing]	Miles P. O'Connor (Nevada City)	Democratic	Elected in 1873. [data missing]	Third seat was eliminated.			Nevada	

=== 1875–present ===
Senators	Party	Years served	Electoral history	Counties represented
Benjamin F. Tuttle (Petaluma)	Democratic	December 6, 1875 – December 3, 1877	Elected in 1875. Retired to run for State Assembly.	Sonoma
[data missing]		December 3, 1877 – January 5, 1880	[data missing]	Sonoma
W. W. Moreland (Healdsburg)	Democratic	January 5, 1880 – January 3, 1881	Elected in 1879. [data missing]	Sonoma
[data missing]		January 3, 1881 – January 8, 1883	[data missing]	Sonoma
George A. Johnson (Santa Rosa)	Democratic	January 8, 1883 – January 3, 1887	Elected in 1882. Retired to run for Attorney General of California.	Sonoma
J. J. Sullivan (San Francisco)	Democratic	January 3, 1887 – January 7, 1889	Elected in 1886. [data missing]	San Francisco
W. O. Banks (San Francisco)	Republican	January 7, 1889 – January 2, 1893	Elected in 1888. [data missing]	San Francisco
William J. Biggy (San Francisco)	Democratic	January 2, 1893 – January 4, 1897	Elected in 1892. [data missing]	San Francisco
Edward I. Wolfe (San Francisco)	Republican	January 4, 1897 – January 6, 1913	Elected in 1896. Re-elected in 1900. Re-elected in 1904. Re-elected in 1908. Redistricted to the 19th district and lost re-election.	San Francisco
Frederick C. Gerdes (San Francisco)	Republican	January 6, 1913 – January 8, 1917	Elected in 1912. Lost re-election.	San Francisco
James C. Nealon (San Francisco)	Democratic	January 8, 1917 – March 1, 1920	Elected in 1916. Died.	San Francisco
Vacant		March 1, 1920 – January 3, 1921		San Francisco
Charles W. Godsil (San Francisco)	Republican	January 3, 1921 – January 5, 1925	Elected in 1920. [data missing]	San Francisco
Roy Fellom (San Francisco)	Republican	January 5, 1925 – January 5, 1931	Elected in 1924. Re-elected in 1928. Resigned to assume seat in the 14th district.	San Francisco
Vacant		January 5, 1931 – March 10, 1931		San Francisco
Timothy E. Treacy (San Francisco)	Nonpartisan	March 10, 1931 – January 2, 1933	Elected to finish Fellom's term. [data missing]	San Francisco
Harry L. Parkman (San Carlos)	Republican	January 2, 1933 – January 7, 1957	Elected in 1932. Re-elected in 1936. Re-elected in 1940. Re-elected in 1944. Re-elected in 1948. Re-elected in 1952. Announced retirement, then ran for re-election. Retired after committee endorsed successor.	San Mateo
Richard J. Dolwig (Redwood City)	Republican	January 7, 1957 – January 2, 1967	Elected in 1956. Re-elected in 1960. Re-elected in 1964. Redistricted to the 12th district.	San Mateo
John L. Harmer (Glendale)	Republican	January 2, 1967 – October 4, 1974	Elected in 1966. Re-elected in 1968. Re-elected in 1972. Resigned when appointed as Lieutenant Governor.	Los Angeles
Vacant		October 4, 1974 – December 20, 1974		Los Angeles
Newton Russell (La Cañada Flintridge)	Republican	December 20, 1974 – November 30, 1996	Elected to finish Harmer's term. Re-elected in 1976. Re-elected in 1980. Re-elected in 1984. Re-elected in 1988. Re-elected in 1992. Retired.	Los Angeles
Adam Schiff (Burbank)	Democratic	December 2, 1996 – November 30, 2000	Elected in 1996. Retired to become a member of the U.S. House of Representatives.	Los Angeles
Jack Scott (Altadena)	Democratic	December 4, 2000 – November 30, 2008	Elected in 2000. Re-elected in 2004. Retired due to term limits.	Los Angeles
Carol Liu (La Cañada Flintridge)	Democratic	December 1, 2008 – November 30, 2012	Elected in 2008. Redistricted to the 25th district.	Los Angeles
Steve Knight (Lancaster)	Republican	December 3, 2012 – January 3, 2015	Elected in 2012. Resigned to become a member of the U.S. House of Representatives.	Los Angeles, San Bernardino
Vacant		January 3, 2015 – March 19, 2015		Los Angeles, San Bernardino
Sharon Runner (Lancaster)	Republican	March 19, 2015 – July 14, 2016	Elected to finish Knight's term. Died.	Los Angeles, San Bernardino
Vacant		July 14, 2016 – December 5, 2016		Los Angeles, San Bernardino
Scott Wilk (Santa Clarita)	Republican	December 5, 2016 – November 30, 2024	Elected in 2016. Re-elected in 2020. Retired due to term limits.	Los Angeles, San Bernardino
Monique Limón (Santa Barbara)	Democratic	December 2, 2024 – present	Redistricted from the 19th district and re-elected in 2024.	Santa Barbara, Ventura

== Election results (1990-present) ==
=== 2024 ===
2024 California State Senate 21st district election
Primary election
Party	Candidate	Votes	%
Democratic	Monique Limón (incumbent)	127,979	61.9
Republican	Elijah Mack	78,816	38.1
Total votes		206,795	100.0
General election
Democratic	Monique Limón (incumbent)	260,656	63.3
Republican	Elijah Mack	151,365	36.7
Total votes		412,021	100.0
Democratic gain from Republican			

=== 2020 ===
2020 California State Senate 21st district election
Primary election
Party	Candidate	Votes	%
Republican	Scott Wilk (incumbent)	96,701	53.1
Democratic	Kipp Mueller	34,232	18.8
Democratic	Dana LaMon	21,911	12.0
Democratic	Warren Heaton	18,554	10.2
Democratic	Steve Hill	10,863	6.0
Total votes		182,261	100.0
General election
Republican	Scott Wilk (incumbent)	199,342	50.8
Democratic	Kipp Mueller	193,202	49.2
Total votes		392,544	100.0
Republican hold			

=== 2016 ===
2016 California State Senate 21st district election
Primary election
Party	Candidate	Votes	%
Republican	Scott Wilk	69,403	46.7
Democratic	Johnathon Levar Ervin	50,078	33.7
Democratic	Steve Hill	17,735	11.9
Republican	Star Moffatt	11,439	7.7
Total votes		148,655	100.0
General election
Republican	Scott Wilk	160,043	52.8
Democratic	Johnathon Levar Ervin	142,886	47.2
Total votes		302,929	100.0
Republican hold			

=== 2015 (special) ===
2015 California State Senate 21st district special election Vacancy resulting from the resignation of Steve Knight
Primary election
Party	Candidate	Votes	%
Republican	Sharon Runner	26,360	94.1
Democratic	Steve Hill (write-in)	996	3.6
Democratic	Joshua Conaway (write-in)	252	0.9
Republican	Jerry J. Laws (write-in)	120	0.4
No party preference	Joshua Cody Chandler (write-in)	108	0.4
Democratic	Richard E. Macias (write-in)	91	0.3
No party preference	Jason Zink (write-in)	90	0.3
Total votes		28,017	100.0
Republican hold			

=== 2012 ===
2012 California State Senate 21st district election
Primary election
Party	Candidate	Votes	%
Republican	Steve Knight	61,245	69.0
Democratic	Star Moffatt	27,545	31.0
Total votes		88,790	100.0
General election
Republican	Steve Knight	153,412	57.6
Democratic	Star Moffatt	112,780	42.4
Total votes		266,192	100.0
Republican gain from Democratic			

=== 2008 ===
2008 California State Senate 21st district election
Party	Candidate	Votes	%
Democratic	Carol Liu	204,737	66.9
Republican	Teddy Choi	77,525	25.3
Libertarian	Steve Myers	23,842	7.8
Total votes		306,104	100.0
Democratic hold			

=== 2004 ===
2004 California State Senate 21st district election
Party	Candidate	Votes	%
Democratic	Jack Scott (incumbent)	217,515	78.1
Libertarian	Bob New	61,160	21.9
Total votes		278,675	100.0
Democratic hold			

=== 2000 ===
2000 California State Senate 21st district election
Party	Candidate	Votes	%
Democratic	Jack Scott	158,145	58.9
Republican	Paul Zee	100,901	37.6
Libertarian	Bob New	9,399	3.5
Total votes		268,445	100.0
Democratic hold			

=== 1996 ===
1996 California State Senate 21st district election
Party	Candidate	Votes	%
Democratic	Adam Schiff	125,649	51.8
Republican	Paula L. Boland	107,039	44.1
Libertarian	Bob New	9,981	4.1
Total votes		242,669	100.0
Democratic gain from Republican			

=== 1992 ===
1992 California State Senate 21st district election
Party	Candidate	Votes	%
Republican	Newton R. Russell (incumbent)	133,385	50.0
Democratic	Rachel J. Dewey	116,486	43.7
Libertarian	James R. "Bob" New	10,658	4.0
Peace and Freedom	Jan B. Tucker	6,031	2.3
No party	Lewis Weiss (write-in)	3	0.0
Total votes		266,563	100.0
Republican hold			

== See also ==
- California State Senate
- California State Senate districts
- Districts in California
