= California's 37th senatorial district =

American legislative district

California's 37th State Senate district
Current senator
Steven Choi; R–Irvine
- Population (2010) • Voting age • Citizen voting age: 937,986; 734,844; 613,024
- Demographics: 56.00% White; 1.56% Black; 21.67% Latino; 19.20% Asian; 0.47% Native American; 0.32% Hawaiian/Pacific Islander; 0.29% other; 0.48% remainder of multiracial
- Registered voters: 623,039
- Registration: 37.11% Democratic; 32.65% Republican; 24.32% No party preference

California's 37th senatorial district is one of 40 California State Senate districts. It is currently represented by Republican Steven Choi of Irvine.

== District profile ==
The district encompasses central Orange County, centered on the city of Irvine. The district contains a mix of near-coastal cities, suburban sprawl, and the Santa Ana Mountains.

Orange County

- Aliso Viejo
- Anaheim Hills
- Costa Mesa
- Fullerton
- Irvine
- Laguna Niguel
- Laguna Woods
- Lake Forest
- North Tustin
- Orange
- Placentia
- Tustin
- Villa Park
- Yorba Linda

== Election results from statewide races ==
Year	Office	Results
2022	Governor	Newsom 50.7 – 49.3%
2022	Senator	Padilla 52.0 - 48.0%
2021	Recall	No 52.5 – 47.5%
2020	President	Biden 54.3 – 43.6%
2018	Governor	Newsom 50.2 – 49.8%
2018	Senator	Feinstein 54.1 – 45.9%
2016	President	Clinton 50.0 – 44.0%
2016	Senator	Harris 59.0 – 41.0%
2014	Governor	Kashkari 57.7 – 42.3%
2012	President	Romney 53.7 – 43.9%
2012	Senator	Emken 54.6 – 45.4%

== List of senators representing the district ==
Due to redistricting, the 37th district has been moved around different parts of the state. The current iteration resulted from the 2021 redistricting by the California Citizens Redistricting Commission.

Senators	Party	Years served	Electoral history	Counties represented
George Steele (San Luis Obispo)	Republican	January 3, 1887 – January 7, 1889	Redistricted from the 3rd district and re-elected in 1886. Retired.	San Luis Obispo, Santa Barbara, Venutra
E. H. Heacock (Santa Barbara)	Republican	January 7, 1889 – January 2, 1893	Elected in 1888. [data missing]	San Luis Obispo, Santa Barbara, Venutra
John R. Mathews (Los Angeles)	Democratic	January 2, 1893 – January 25, 1896	Elected in 1892. Resigned.	Los Angeles
Vacant		January 25, 1896 – January 4, 1897		Los Angeles
Robert N. Bulla (Los Angeles)	Republican	January 4, 1897 – January 1, 1901	Elected in 1896. [data missing]	Los Angeles
Frederick M. Smith (Los Angeles)	Republican	January 1, 1901 – January 2, 1905	Elected in 1900. [data missing]	Los Angeles
Henry E. Carter (Los Angeles)	Republican	January 2, 1905 – January 4, 1909	Elected in 1904. [data missing]	Los Angeles
Henry M. Hurd (Los Angeles)	Republican	January 4, 1909 – January 6, 1913	Elected in 1908. [data missing]	Los Angeles
William E. Brown (Manhattan Beach)	Republican	January 6, 1913 – January 3, 1921	Elected in 1912. Re-elected in 1916. [data missing]	Los Angeles
Newton M. Allen (Los Angeles)	Republican	January 3, 1921 – January 7, 1929	Elected in 1920. Re-elected in 1924. [data missing]	Los Angeles
George W. Rochester (Los Angeles)	Republican	January 7, 1929 – January 2, 1933	Elected in 1928. [data missing]	Los Angeles
Leonard J. Difani (Riverside)	Republican	January 2, 1933 – January 4, 1937	Elected in 1932. Lost renomination.	Riverside
John R. Phillips (Banning)	Republican	January 4, 1937 – November 15, 1942	Elected in 1936. Re-elected in 1940. Resigned after election to the U.S. House of Representatives.	Riverside
Vacant		November 15, 1942 – January 8, 1945		Riverside
Nelson S. Dilworth (Hemet)	Republican	January 8, 1945 – January 2, 1961	Elected in 1944. Re-elected in 1948. Re-elected in 1952. Re-elected in 1956. Retired.	Riverside
Lee Backstrand (Riverside)	Republican	January 2, 1961 – April 26, 1964	Elected in 1960. Won renomination, then died.	Riverside
Vacant		April 26, 1964 – January 4, 1965		Riverside
Gordon Cologne (Indio)	Republican	January 4, 1965 – January 2, 1967	Replaced Backstrand on ballot and elected in 1964. Redistricted to the 36th district.	Riverside
George Deukmejian (Long Beach)	Republican	January 2, 1967 – November 30, 1976	Elected in 1966. Re-elected in 1968. Re-elected in 1972. Redistricted to the 31st district.	Los Angeles
Paul B. Carpenter (Cypress)	Democratic	December 6, 1976 – November 30, 1984	Elected in 1976. Re-elected in 1980. Redistricted to the 33rd district.	Orange
Marian Bergeson (Newport Beach)	Republican	December 3, 1984 – November 30, 1992	Elected in 1984. Re-elected in 1988. Redistricted to the 35th district.	Imperial, Orange, Riverside, San Diego
David G. Kelley (Riverside)	Republican	December 7, 1992 – November 30, 2000	Elected in 1992. Re-elected in 1992. Retired to run for State Assembly.	Imperial, Riverside, San Diego
Jim Battin (La Quinta)	Republican	December 4, 2000 – November 30, 2008	Elected in 2000. Re-elected in 2004. Term-limited and retired.	Imperial, Riverside, San Diego
Jim Battin (La Quinta)	Republican	December 4, 2000 – November 30, 2008	Elected in 2000. Re-elected in 2004. Term-limited and retired.	Riverside
John J. Benoit (Bermuda Dunes)	Republican	December 1, 2008 – November 30, 2009	Elected in 2008. Resigned after election to the Riverside County Board of Supervisors.	Riverside
Vacant		November 30, 2009 – June 9, 2010		Riverside
Bill Emmerson (Redlands)	Republican	June 9, 2010 – November 30, 2012	Elected to finish Benoit's term. Redistricted to the 23rd district.	Riverside
Mimi Walters (Irvine)	Republican	December 3, 2012 – January 3, 2015	Redistricted from the 33rd district and re-elected in 2012. Retired to run for U.S. House of Representatives.	Orange
Vacant		January 3, 2015 – March 22, 2015		Orange
John Moorlach (Costa Mesa)	Republican	March 22, 2015 – November 30, 2020	Elected to finish vacant term. Re-elected in 2016. Lost re-election.	Orange
Dave Min (Irvine)	Democratic	December 7, 2020 – November 30, 2024	Elected in 2020. Retired to run for U.S. House of Representatives.	Orange
Steven Choi (Irvine)	Republican	December 2, 2024 – present	Elected in 2024.	Orange

== Election results (1990-present) ==
=== 2024 ===
2024 California State Senate 37th district election
Primary election
Party	Candidate	Votes	%
Democratic	Josh Newman (incumbent)	67,109	30.1
Republican	Steven Choi	48,364	21.7
Republican	Crystal Miles	31,132	14.0
Republican	Guy Selleck	22,546	10.1
Democratic	Alex Mohajer	18,550	8.3
Republican	Anthony C. Kuo	15,739	7.1
Democratic	Leticia Correa	6,000	2.7
Democratic	Stephanie Le	4,532	2.0
Democratic	Gabrielle Ashbaugh	4,396	2.0
Democratic	Jenny Suarez	3,191	1.4
Democratic	Jacob Niles Creer	1,606	0.7
Total votes		223,165	100.0
General election
Republican	Steven Choi	232,345	50.7
Democratic	Josh Newman (incumbent)	226,270	49.3
Total votes		458,615	100.0
Republican gain from Democratic			

=== 2020 ===
2020 California State Senate 37th district election
Primary election
Party	Candidate	Votes	%
Republican	John Moorlach (incumbent)	132,275	47.3
Democratic	Dave Min	78,293	28.0
Democratic	Katrina Foley	68,952	24.7
Total votes		279,520	100.0
General election
Democratic	Dave Min	270,522	51.1
Republican	John Moorlach (incumbent)	258,421	48.9
Total votes		528,943	100.0
Democratic gain from Republican			

=== 2016 ===
2016 California State Senate 37th district election
Primary election
Party	Candidate	Votes	%
Republican	John Moorlach (incumbent)	114,540	54.8
Democratic	Ari Grayson	94,369	45.2
Total votes		208,909	100.0
General election
Republican	John Moorlach (incumbent)	228,480	57.0
Democratic	Ari Grayson	172,455	43.0
Total votes		400,935	100.0
Republican hold			

=== 2015 (special) ===
2015 California State Senate 37th district special election Vacancy resulting from the resignation of Mimi Walters
Primary election
Party	Candidate	Votes	%
Republican	John Moorlach	38,125	50.3
Republican	Don Wagner	33,411	44.0
Republican	Naz Namazi	2,261	3.5
Democratic	Louise Stewardson (write-in)	1,696	2.2
Total votes		75,493	100.0
Republican hold			

=== 2012 ===
2012 California State Senate 37th district election
Primary election
Party	Candidate	Votes	%
Republican	Mimi Walters (incumbent)	88,321	63.6
Democratic	Steve Young	50,562	36.4
Total votes		138,883	100.0
General election
Republican	Mimi Walters (incumbent)	213,086	57.0
Democratic	Steve Young	160,595	43.0
Total votes		373,681	100.0
Republican hold			

=== 2010 (special) ===
2010 California State Senate 37th district special election Vacancy resulting from the resignation of John J. Benoit
Primary election
Party	Candidate	Votes	%
Republican	Bill Emmerson	39,875	41.8
Republican	Russ Bogh	20,957	21.9
Democratic	Justin Blake	13,289	13.9
Democratic	Anna Nevenic	8,076	8.5
Democratic	Arthur Bravo Guerrero	6,826	7.1
American Independent	Matt Monica	4,195	4.4
Republican	David W. Peters	2,267	2.4
Total votes		95,485	100.0
General election
Republican	Bill Emmerson	81,655	59.7
Democratic	Justin Blake	41,243	30.1
American Independent	Matt Monica	13,965	10.2
Total votes		136,863	100.0
Republican hold			

=== 2008 ===
2008 California State Senate 37th district election
Party	Candidate	Votes	%
Republican	John Benoit	190,415	54.8
Democratic	Arthur Guerrero	157,142	45.2
Total votes		347,557	100.0
Republican hold			

=== 2004 ===
2004 California State Senate 37th district election
Party	Candidate	Votes	%
Republican	Jim Battin (incumbent)	182,578	59.6
Democratic	Pat Johansen	123,602	40.4
Total votes		306,180	100.0
Republican hold			

=== 2000 ===
2000 California State Senate 37th district election
Party	Candidate	Votes	%
Republican	Jim Battin	177,665	62.2
Democratic	Sedalia L. Sanders	94,391	33.0
Libertarian	Donna Tello	13,649	4.8
Total votes		285,705	100.0
Republican hold			

=== 1996 ===
1996 California State Senate 37th district election
Party	Candidate	Votes	%
Republican	David G. Kelley (incumbent)	157,090	61.1
Democratic	Hans Alfred Schroeder	75,943	29.6
Libertarian	Donna Tello	10,313	4.0
Reform	George Angell	9,121	3.5
Natural Law	Jim J. Moner	4,486	1.7
Total votes		256,953	100.0
Republican hold			

=== 1992 ===
1992 California State Senate 37th district election
Party	Candidate	Votes	%
Republican	David G. Kelley	141,970	52.5
Democratic	Jim Rickard	101,872	37.7
Peace and Freedom	Renate M. Kline	16,870	6.2
Libertarian	Craig McElvany	9,845	3.6
Total votes		270,557	100.0
Republican hold			

== See also ==
- California State Senate
- California State Senate districts
- Districts in California
