= California's 15th senatorial district =

American legislative district

California's 15th State Senate district
Current senator
| Dave Cortese; D–San Jose |
- Population (2010) • Voting age • Citizen voting age: 928,584; 698,809; 539,225
- Demographics: 34.28% White; 2.74% Black; 30.04% Latino; 31.18% Asian; 0.47% Native American; 0.41% Hawaiian/Pacific Islander; 0.25% other; 0.64% remainder of multiracial
- Registered voters: 498,633
- Registration: 47.86% Democratic; 17.17% Republican; 30.83% No party preference

California's 15th senatorial district is one of 40 California State Senate districts. It is currently represented by Democrat Dave Cortese of San Jose.

== District profile ==
The district encompasses central and eastern Santa Clara County. Most of the district's population lives in San Jose, but it also includes some outlying areas like Mount Hamilton, Coyote, Sveadal, Morgan Hill, and Gilroy.

== Election results from statewide races ==
| Year | Office | Results |
|---|---|---|
| 2021 | Recall | No 72.0 – 28.0% |
| 2020 | President | Biden 71.7 – 26.2% |
| 2018 | Governor | Newsom 70.8 – 29.2% |
| 2018 | Senator | Feinstein 59.7 – 40.3% |
| 2016 | President | Clinton 73.0 – 21.3% |
| 2016 | Senator | Harris 65.3 – 34.7% |
| 2014 | Governor | Brown 72.5 – 27.5% |
| 2012 | President | Obama 69.8 – 27.8% |
| 2012 | Senator | Feinstein 72.5 – 27.5% |

Election results from statewide races
| Year | Office | Results |
|---|---|---|
| 2000 | President | Gore 58.4 - 34.5% |
| 2000 | Senator | Feinstein 56.9 - 34.5% |
| 1998 | Governor | Davis 61.7 - 33.5% |
| 1998 | Senator | Boxer 56.5 - 39.0% |
| 1996 | President | Clinton 54.1 - 33.2% |
| 1994 | Governor | Wilson 48.6 - 46.6% |
| 1994 | Senator | Feinstein 50.4 - 39.5% |
| 1992 | President | Clinton 50.4 - 27.8% |
| 1992 | Senator | Boxer 55.0 - 36.8% |
| 1992 | Senator | Feinstein 62.1 - 31.3% |

== List of senators representing the district ==
Due to redistricting, the 15th district has been moved around different parts of the state. The current iteration resulted from the 2021 redistricting by the California Citizens Redistricting Commission.

| Senators | Party | Years served | Counties represented | Notes |
|---|---|---|---|---|
| Warren B. English | Democratic | January 8, 1883 – January 5, 1885 | Contra Costa, Marin | |
| Frank Coye De Long | Republican | January 5, 1885 – January 3, 1887 | Contra Costa, Marin | |
| Joshua Plummer Abbott | Republican | January 3, 1887 – January 7, 1889 | Contra Costa, Marin | |
| Frank Coye De Long | Republican | January 7, 1889 – January 2, 1893 | Contra Costa, Marin | |
| Benjamin Franklin Langford | Democratic | January 2, 1893 – January 1, 1901 | San Joaquin | |
| August Edward Muenter | Republican | January 1, 1901 – January 2, 1905 | San Joaquin | |
| George Russell Lukens | Republican | January 2, 1905 – January 4, 1909 | Alameda | |
| John Walter Stetson | Republican | January 4, 1909 – January 6, 1913 | Alameda | |
| Arthur H. Breed Sr. | Republican | January 6, 1913 – January 5, 1931 | Alameda | At the time when the Lieutenant Governor's seat became vacant, he temporary becoming acting Lieutenant Governor. |
| Thomas McCormack | Republican | January 2, 1933 – January 3, 1949 | Solano | |
| Luther E. Gibson | Democratic | January 3, 1949 – January 6, 1967 | Solano | |
| Howard Way | Republican | January 6, 1967 – November 30, 1976 | Fresno, Inyo, Madera, Mariposa, Merced, Mono, Tulare | |
| Rose Ann Vuich | Democratic | December 6, 1976 – November 30, 1992 | Fresno, Kern, Kings, Tulare | |
| Rose Ann Vuich | Democratic | December 6, 1976 – November 30, 1992 | Fresno, Tulare | |
| Henry J. Mello | Democratic | December 7, 1992 – November 30, 1996 | Monterey, San Benito, Santa Clara, Santa Cruz | |
| Bruce McPherson | Republican | December 2, 1996 – November 30, 2004 | Monterey, San Benito, Santa Clara, Santa Cruz | |
| Abel Maldonado | Republican | December 6, 2004 – April 27, 2010 | Monterey, San Luis Obispo, Santa Barbara, Santa Clara, Santa Cruz | Resigned to become Lieutenant Governor of California. |
| Vacant | | April 27, 2010 – August 23, 2010 | Monterey, San Luis Obispo, Santa Barbara, Santa Clara, Santa Cruz | |
| Sam Blakeslee | Republican | August 23, 2010 – November 30, 2012 | Monterey, San Luis Obispo, Santa Barbara, Santa Clara, Santa Cruz | Sworn in after winning special election. |
| Jim Beall | Democratic | December 3, 2012 – November 30, 2020 | Santa Clara | |
| Dave Cortese | Democratic | December 7, 2020 – present | Santa Clara | |

== Election results (1990-present) ==
=== 2024 ===
2024 California State Senate 15th district election
Primary election
| Party | Candidate | Votes | % |
|---|---|---|---|
| Democratic | Dave Cortese (incumbent) | 124,539 | 69.0 |
| Republican | Robert Howell | 34,205 | 19.0 |
| Republican | Tony Loaiza | 21,643 | 12.0 |
| Total votes | | 180,387 | 100.0 |
General election
| Democratic | Dave Cortese (incumbent) | 260,719 | 68.6 |
| Republican | Robert Howell | 119,310 | 31.4 |
| Total votes | | 380,029 | 100.0 |
| Democratic hold | | | |

=== 2020 ===
2020 California State Senate 15th district election
Primary election
| Party | Candidate | Votes | % |
|---|---|---|---|
| Democratic | David Cortese | 79,507 | 33.9 |
| Democratic | Ann Ravel | 51,752 | 22.1 |
| Democratic | Nora Campos | 39,683 | 16.9 |
| Republican | Robert Howell | 23,840 | 10.2 |
| No party preference | Johnny Khamis | 23,747 | 10.1 |
| Republican | Ken Del Valle | 14,280 | 6.1 |
| No party preference | Tim Gildersleeve | 1,635 | 0.7 |
| Total votes | | 234,444 | 100.0 |
General election
| Democratic | David Cortese | 212,207 | 54.8 |
| Democratic | Ann Ravel | 175,203 | 45.2 |
| Total votes | | 387,410 | 100.0 |
| Democratic hold | | | |

=== 2016 ===
2016 California State Senate 15th district election
Primary election
| Party | Candidate | Votes | % |
|---|---|---|---|
| Democratic | Jim Beall (incumbent) | 97,948 | 49.4 |
| Democratic | Nora Campos | 53,250 | 26.9 |
| Republican | Chuck Page | 40,783 | 20.6 |
| Republican | Anthony Macias | 6,147 | 3.1 |
| Total votes | | 198,128 | 100.0 |
General election
| Democratic | Jim Beall (incumbent) | 196,089 | 62.5 |
| Democratic | Nora Campos | 117,442 | 37.5 |
| Total votes | | 313,531 | 100.0 |
| Democratic hold | | | |

=== 2012 ===
2012 California State Senate 15th district election
Primary election
| Party | Candidate | Votes | % |
|---|---|---|---|
| Democratic | Jim Beall | 69,179 | 55.5 |
| Democratic | Joe Coto | 55,387 | 44.5 |
| Total votes | | 124,566 | 100.0 |
General election
| Democratic | Jim Beall | 160,451 | 56.7 |
| Democratic | Joe Coto | 122,345 | 43.3 |
| Total votes | | 282,796 | 100.0 |
| Democratic gain from Republican | | | |

=== 2010 (special) ===
2019 California State Senate 15th district special election Vacancy resulting from the resignation of Abel Maldonado
| Party | Candidate | Votes | % |
|---|---|---|---|
| Republican | Sam Blakeslee | 72,248 | 49.4 |
| Democratic | John Laird | 61,150 | 41.8 |
| Independent | John Fitzgerald | 8,620 | 5.9 |
| Libertarian | Mark Hinkle | 4,241 | 2.9 |
| Total votes | | 146,259 | 100.0 |
| Republican hold | | | |

=== 2008 ===
2008 California State Senate 15th district election
| Party | Candidate | Votes | % |
|---|---|---|---|
| Republican | Abel Maldonado (incumbent) | 222,617 | 62.9 |
| Independent | Jim Fitzgerald | 131,229 | 37.1 |
| Total votes | | 353,846 | 100.0 |
| Republican hold | | | |

=== 2004 ===
2004 California State Senate 15th district election
| Party | Candidate | Votes | % |
|---|---|---|---|
| Republican | Abel Maldonado | 194,674 | 52.8 |
| Democratic | Peg Pinard | 157,556 | 42.7 |
| Green | Brook Madsen | 16,644 | 4.5 |
| Total votes | | 368,874 | 100.0 |
| Republican hold | | | |

=== 2000 ===
2000 California State Senate 15th district election
| Party | Candidate | Votes | % |
|---|---|---|---|
| Republican | Bruce McPherson (incumbent) | 155,039 | 55.2 |
| Democratic | Anselmo A. Chavez | 112,942 | 40.2 |
| Natural Law | David Rosenkranz | 6,425 | 2.3 |
| Libertarian | Gordon D. Sachtjen | 6,394 | 2.3 |
| Total votes | | 280,800 | 100.0 |
| Republican hold | | | |

=== 1996 ===
1996 California State Senate 15th district election
| Party | Candidate | Votes | % |
|---|---|---|---|
| Republican | Bruce McPherson | 124,448 | 47.2 |
| Democratic | Rusty Areias | 120,846 | 45.8 |
| Green | E. Craig Coffin | 12,089 | 4.6 |
| Natural Law | Scott R. Hartley | 6,377 | 2.4 |
| Total votes | | 263,760 | 100.0 |
| Republican gain from Democratic | | | |

=== 1992 ===
1992 California State Senate 15th district election
| Party | Candidate | Votes | % |
|---|---|---|---|
| Democratic | Henry J. Mello (incumbent) | 162,771 | 58.4 |
| Republican | Edward Laverone | 95,142 | 34.1 |
| Peace and Freedom | Susanne Espinoza | 20,818 | 7.5 |
| Total votes | | 278,731 | 100.0 |
| Democratic hold | | | |

== See also ==
- California State Senate
- California State Senate districts
- Districts in California
