= California's 33rd senatorial district =

American legislative district

California's 33rd State Senate district
Current senator
Lena Gonzalez; D–Long Beach
- Population (2010) • Voting age • Citizen voting age: 926,972; 652,106; 414,477
- Demographics: 13.00% White; 8.87% Black; 69.98% Latino; 6.51% Asian; 0.32% Native American; 0.58% Hawaiian/Pacific Islander; 0.24% other; 0.49% remainder of multiracial
- Registered voters: 442,974
- Registration: 57.60% Democratic; 11.83% Republican; 24.62% No party preference

California's 33rd senatorial district is one of 40 California State Senate districts. It is currently represented by Democrat Lena Gonzalez of Long Beach.

== District profile ==
The district encompasses a strip of the Gateway Cities, stretching from parts of South Los Angeles to the coast, including the Port of Long Beach and a significant portion of Long Beach itself.

Los Angeles County – 9.4%

- Bell
- Bell Gardens
- Cudahy
- Huntington Park
- Lakewood – 36.3%
- Long Beach – 79.1%
- Los Angeles – 0.9%
- Lynwood
- Maywood
- Paramount
- Signal Hill
- South Gate
- Vernon

== Election results from statewide races ==
Year	Office	Results
2020	President	Biden 76.7 – 20.8%
2018	Governor	Newsom 78.2 – 21.8%
2018	Senator	Feinstein 54.1 – 45.9%
2016	President	Clinton 79.1 – 15.2%
2016	Senator	Harris 51.8 – 48.2%
2014	Governor	Brown 73.7 – 26.3%
2012	President	Obama 78.6 – 19.1%
2012	Senator	Feinstein 78.8 – 21.2%

== List of senators representing the district ==
Due to redistricting, the 33rd district has been moved around different parts of the state. The current iteration resulted from the 2021 redistricting by the California Citizens Redistricting Commission.

Senators	Party	Years served	Electoral history	Counties represented
James D. Byrnes (San Mateo)	Republican	January 3, 1887 – January 2, 1893	Elected in 1886. Re-elected in 1888. [data missing]	San Mateo, Santa Cruz
Thomas Flint Jr. (Hollister)	Republican	January 2, 1893 – January 2, 1905	Redistricted from the 35th district and re-elected in 1892. Re-elected in 1896. Re-elected in 1900. [data missing]	Monterey, San Benito
Charles B. Greenwell (Santa Barbara)	Republican	January 2, 1905 – January 4, 1909	Redistricted from the 35th district and re-elected in 1904. [data missing]	Santa Barbara, Ventura
Louis H. Roseberry (Santa Barbara)	Republican	January 4, 1909 – January 6, 1913	Elected in 1908. [data missing]	Santa Barbara, Ventura
Prescott F. Cogswell (El Monte)	Republican	January 6, 1913 – January 8, 1917	Elected in 1912. Lost re-election as a Progressive.	Los Angeles
Prescott F. Cogswell (El Monte)	Progressive	January 6, 1913 – January 8, 1917	Elected in 1912. Lost re-election as a Progressive.	Los Angeles
Joseph A. Rominger (Los Angeles)	Republican	January 8, 1917 – January 5, 1925	Elected in 1918. Re-elected in 1920. [data missing]	Los Angeles
Cadet Taylor (Pomona)	Republican	January 5, 1925 – January 7, 1929	Elected in 1924. [data missing]	Los Angeles
Frank Merriam (Long Beach)	Republican	January 7, 1929 – January 6, 1931	Elected in 1928. Resigned after election as Lieutenant Governor of California.	Los Angeles
Vacant		January 6, 1931 – March 4, 1931		Los Angeles
Ralph H. Clock (Long Beach)	Republican	March 4, 1931 – January 2, 1933	Elected to finish Merriam's term. Not a candidate for the next election.	Los Angeles
Walter H. Duval (Santa Paula)	Republican	January 2, 1933 – January 4, 1937	Redistricted from the 25th district and re-elected in 1932. [data missing]	Ventura
James J. McBride (Santa Ana)	Democratic	January 4, 1937 – June 12, 1961	Elected in 1936. Re-elected in 1940. Re-elected in 1944. Re-elected in 1948. Re-elected in 1952. Re-elected in 1956. Re-elected in 1960. Died.	Ventura
Vacant		June 12, 1961 – November 10, 1961		Ventura
Robert J. Lagomarsino (Ojai)	Republican	November 10, 1961 – January 2, 1967	Elected to finish McBride's term. Re-elected in 1962. Redistricted to the 24th district.	Ventura
Joseph M. Kennick (Los Angeles)	Democratic	January 2, 1967 – November 30, 1976	Elected in 1966. Re-elected in 1968. Re-elected in 1972. [data missing]	Los Angeles
William Campbell (Hacienda Heights)	Republican	December 6, 1976 – November 30, 1984	Elected in 1976. Re-elected in 1980. Redistricted to the 31st district.	Los Angeles
Paul B. Carpenter (Cypress)	Democratic	December 3, 1984 – January 5, 1987	Redistricted from the 37th district and re-elected in 1984. Resigned after election to the California State Board of Equalization.	Los Angeles, Orange
Vacant		January 5, 1987 – May 18, 1987		Los Angeles, Orange
Cecil Green (Norwalk)	Democratic	May 18, 1987 – November 30, 1992	Elected to finish Carpenter's term. Re-elected in 1988. [data missing]	Los Angeles, Orange
John Lewis (Orange)	Republican	December 7, 1992 – November 30, 2000	Redistricted from the 35th district and re-elected in 1992. Re-elected in 1996. Term-limited and retired.	Orange
Dick Ackerman (Fullerton)	Republican	December 4, 2000 – November 30, 2008	Elected in 2000. Re-elected in 2004. Term-limited and retired.	Orange
Mimi Walters (Irvine)	Republican	December 1, 2008 – November 30, 2012	Elected in 2008. Redistricted to the 37th district.	Orange
Ricardo Lara (Bell Gardens)	Democratic	December 3, 2012 – January 7, 2019	Elected in 2012. Re-elected in 2016. Resigned after election as California Insurance Commissioner.	Los Angeles
Vacant		January 7, 2019 – June 12, 2019		Los Angeles
Lena Gonzalez (Long Beach)	Democratic	June 12, 2019 – present	Elected to finish Lara's term. Re-elected in 2020. Re-elected in 2024.	Los Angeles

== Election results (1990-present) ==
=== 2024 ===
2024 California State Senate 33rd district election
Primary election
Party	Candidate	Votes	%
Democratic	Lena Gonzalez (incumbent)	86,226	68.6
Republican	Mario Paz	21,470	17.1
Republican	Sharifah A. Hardie	18,061	14.4
Total votes		125,757	100.0
General election
Democratic	Lena Gonzalez (incumbent)	217,560	69.9
Republican	Mario Paz	93,574	30.1
Total votes		311,134	100.0
Democratic hold			

=== 2020 ===
2020 California State Senate 33rd district election
Primary election
Party	Candidate	Votes	%
Democratic	Lena Gonzalez (incumbent)	109,428	99.8
Democratic	Elizabeth Castillo (write-in)	205	0.2
Total votes		109,633	100.0
General election
Democratic	Lena Gonzalez (incumbent)	164,752	61.8
Democratic	Elizabeth Castillo	101,831	38.2
Total votes		266,583	100.0
Democratic hold			

=== 2019 (special) ===
2019 California State Senate 33rd district special election Vacancy resulting from the resignation of Ricardo Lara
Primary election
Party	Candidate	Votes	%
Democratic	Lena Gonzalez	10,984	31.6
Republican	Jack M. Guerrero	4,860	14.0
Democratic	Ali Saleh	3,334	9.6
Democratic	Ana Maria Quintana	3,038	8.8
Democratic	Jose Solache	2,594	7.5
Democratic	Denise Diaz	2,404	6.9
Republican	Martha Flores Gibson	2,225	6.4
Democratic	Leticia Vasquez Wilson	1,839	5.3
Democratic	Al Austin, II	1,356	3.9
Democratic	Thomas Jefferson Cares	828	2.4
Democratic	Chris Garcia	720	2.1
Green	Cesar Flores	529	1.5
Total votes		34,711	100.0
General election
Democratic	Lena Gonzalez	32,394	69.8
Republican	Jack M. Guerrero	14,049	30.2
Total votes		46,443	100.0
Democratic hold			

=== 2016 ===
2016 California State Senate 33rd district election
Primary election
Party	Candidate	Votes	%
Democratic	Ricardo Lara (incumbent)	104,027	100.0
Libertarian	Honor Mimi Robson (write-in)	47	0.0
Total votes		104,074	100.0
General election
Democratic	Ricardo Lara (incumbent)	177,971	78.6
Libertarian	Honor Mimi Robson	48,316	21.4
Total votes		226,287	100.0
Democratic hold			

=== 2012 ===
2012 California State Senate 33rd district election
Primary election
Party	Candidate	Votes	%
Democratic	Ricardo Lara	35,865	100.0
Peace and Freedom	Lee H. Chauser (write-in)	3	0.0
Total votes		35,868	100.0
General election
Democratic	Ricardo Lara	158,707	80.4
Peace and Freedom	Lee H. Chauser	38,671	19.6
Total votes		197,378	100.0
Democratic gain from Republican			

=== 2008 ===
2008 California State Senate 33rd district election
Party	Candidate	Votes	%
Republican	Mimi Walters	219,068	58.1
Democratic	Gary Pritchard	157,945	41.9
Total votes		377,013	100.0
Republican hold			

=== 2004 ===
2004 California State Senate 33rd district election
Party	Candidate	Votes	%
Republican	Dick Ackerman (incumbent)	245,116	69.0
Democratic	Randall Daugherty	110,313	31.0
Total votes		355,429	100.0
Republican hold			

=== 2000 ===
2000 California State Senate 33rd district election
Party	Candidate	Votes	%
Republican	Dick Ackerman	212,705	65.7
Democratic	Jack L. Roberts	94,176	29.1
Libertarian	Michael E. Chacon	11,708	3.6
Natural Law	William H. Verkamp	5,391	1.7
Total votes		323,980	100.0
Republican hold			

=== 1996 ===
1996 California State Senate 33rd district election
Party	Candidate	Votes	%
Republican	John Lewis (incumbent)	199,173	68.6
Democratic	David Robert Heywood	91,011	31.4
Total votes		290,184	100.0
Republican hold			

=== 1992 ===
1992 California State Senate 33rd district election
Party	Candidate	Votes	%
Republican	John Lewis (incumbent)	191,974	64.1
Democratic	Samuel D. Eidt	86,859	29.0
Libertarian	Doyle Guhy	20,543	6.9
Total votes		299,376	100.0
Republican gain from Democratic			

== See also ==
- California State Senate
- California State Senate districts
- Districts in California
