= California's 31st senatorial district =

American legislative district

California's 31st State Senate district
Current senator
Sabrina Cervantes; D–Corona
- Population (2010) • Voting age • Citizen voting age: 940,612; 659,186; 476,314
- Demographics: 28.71% White; 9.17% Black; 52.40% Latino; 7.85% Asian; 0.58% Native American; 0.43% Hawaiian/Pacific Islander; 0.25% other; 0.61% remainder of multiracial
- Registered voters: 451,552
- Registration: 44.99% Democratic; 27.50% Republican; 21.90% No party preference

California's 31st senatorial district is one of 40 California State Senate districts. It is currently represented by Democrat Sabrina Cervantes of Corona.

== District profile ==
The district encompasses urbanized and suburban parts of the Inland Empire in northwestern Riverside County. It forms an arc stretching from Corona in the west to Perris in the southeast, centered on the city of Riverside.

Riverside County – 43.0%

- Corona - partial
- Coronita
- Eastvale
- El Cerrito
- Highgrove
- Home Gardens
- Jurupa Valley
- Mead Valley – partial
- Moreno Valley
- Norco – partial
- Perris
- Riverside – partial

== Other levels of government ==
The 31st Senate District has nested within it both the 60th Assembly district, represented by Democrat Corey Jackson; and the 61st Assembly district, represented by Democrat Tina McKinnor.

In the United States House of Representatives, the 30th Senate District is split between the California's 41st congressional district, represented by Republican Ken Calvert; and California's 42nd congressional district, represented by Democrat Robert Garcia.

== Election results from statewide races ==
Year	Office	Results
2021	Recall	No 54.5 – 45.5%
2020	President	Biden 58.3 – 39.6%
2018	Governor	Newsom 55.9 – 44.1%
2018	Senator	Feinstein 50.7 – 49.3%
2016	President	Clinton 57.4 – 36.9%
2016	Senator	Harris 53.5 – 46.5%
2014	Governor	Brown 50.6 – 49.4%
2012	President	Obama 57.5 – 40.3%
2012	Senator	Feinstein 59.0 – 41.0%

== List of senators representing the district ==
Due to redistricting, the 31st district has been moved around different parts of the state. The current iteration resulted from the 2021 redistricting by the California Citizens Redistricting Commission.

Senators	Party	Years served	Electoral history	Counties represented
A. W. Crandall (San Jose)	Republican	January 3, 1887 – January 2, 1893	Elected in 1886. Re-elected in 1888. [data missing]	Santa Clara
L. A. Whitehurst (Gilroy)	Democratic	January 2, 1893 – January 4, 1897	Elected in 1892. [data missing]	Santa Clara
Henry V. Morehouse (San Jose)	Republican	January 4, 1897 – January 1, 1901	Elected in 1898. [data missing]	Santa Clara
Louis Oneal (San Jose)	Republican	January 1, 1901 – January 2, 1905	Elected in 1900. [data missing]	Santa Clara
Henry W. Lynch (Pleyto)	Republican	January 2, 1905 – January 6, 1913	Elected in 1904. Re-elected in 1908. [data missing]	Monterey, San Benito, San Luis Obispo
Edwin M. Butler (Los Angeles)	Republican	January 6, 1913 – January 8, 1917	Elected in 1912. [data missing]	Los Angeles
Harry A. Chamberlin (Los Angeles)	Republican	January 8, 1917 – January 7, 1929	Elected in 1916. Re-elected in 1920. Re-elected in 1924. [data missing]	Los Angeles
Henry E. Carter (Los Angeles)	Republican	January 7, 1929 – January 2, 1933	Elected in 1928. [data missing]	Los Angeles
Edgar W. Stow (Goleta)	Republican	January 2, 1933 – January 4, 1937	Elected in 1932. [data missing]	Santa Barbara
John J. Hollister Sr. (Santa Barbara)	Democratic	January 4, 1937 – January 6, 1941	Elected in 1936. Lost re-election.	Santa Barbara
Clarence C. Ward (Santa Barbara)	Republican	January 6, 1941 – May 9, 1955	Elected in 1940. Re-elected in 1944. Re-elected in 1948. Re-elected in 1952. Died.	Santa Barbara
Vacant		May 9, 1955 – December 2, 1955		Santa Barbara
John J. Hollister Jr. (Santa Barbara)	Democratic	December 2, 1955 – November 23, 1961	Elected to finish Ward's term. Re-elected in 1956. Re-elected in 1960. Died.	Santa Barbara
Vacant		November 23, 1961 – February 24, 1962		Santa Barbara
Alvin C. Weingand (Santa Barbara)	Democratic	February 24, 1962 – January 2, 1967	Elected to finish Hollister Jr.'s term. Re-elected in 1964. Redistricted to the 24th district and lost re-election.	Santa Barbara
James Q. Wedworth (Hawthorne)	Democratic	January 2, 1967 – November 30, 1976	Elected in 1966. Re-elected in 1968. Re-elected in 1972. Redistricted to the 27th district and lost re-election.	Los Angeles
George Deukmejian (Long Beach)	Republican	December 6, 1976 – January 8, 1979	Redistricted from the 37th district and re-elected in 1976. Resigned after becoming Attorney General.	Los Angeles
Vacant		January 8, 1979 – April 26, 1979		Los Angeles
Ollie Speraw (Long Beach)	Republican	April 26, 1979 – November 30, 1984	Elected to finish vacant term. Re-elected in 1980. Retired.	Los Angeles
William Campbell (Hacienda Heights)	Republican	December 3, 1984 – December 15, 1989	Redistricted from the 33rd district and re-elected in 1984. Re-elected in 1988. Resigned.	Los Angeles, Orange
Vacant		December 15, 1989 – April 16, 1990		Los Angeles, Orange
Frank Hill (Whittier)	Republican	April 16, 1990 – November 30, 1992	Elected to finish Campbell's term. Redistricted to the 29th district.	Los Angeles, Orange
Bill Leonard (San Bernardino)	Republican	December 7, 1992 – November 30, 1996	Redistricted from the 25th district and re-elected in 1992. Retired to run for State Assembly.	Riverside, San Bernardino
Jim Brulte (Rancho Cucamonga)	Republican	December 2, 1996 – November 30, 2004	Elected in 1996. Re-elected in 2000. Retired due to term limits.	Riverside, San Bernardino
Robert Dutton (Rancho Cucamonga)	Republican	December 6, 2004 – November 30, 2012	Elected in 2004. Re-elected in 2008. Retired to run for U.S. House of Representatives.	Riverside, San Bernardino
Richard Roth (Riverside)	Democratic	December 3, 2012 – November 30, 2024	Elected in 2012. Re-elected in 2016. Re-elected in 2020. Retired due to term limits.	Riverside
Sabrina Cervantes (Riverside)	Democratic	December 2, 2024 – present	Elected in 2024.	Riverside

== Election results (1990-present) ==
=== 2024 ===
2024 California State Senate 31st district election
Primary election
Party	Candidate	Votes	%
Republican	Cynthia Navarro	46,633	45.9
Democratic	Sabrina Cervantes	40,033	39.4
Democratic	Angelo Farooq	15,026	14.8
Total votes		101,692	100.0
General election
Democratic	Sabrina Cervantes	153,282	54.3
Republican	Cynthia Navarro	128,994	45.7
Total votes		282,276	100.0
Democratic hold			

=== 2020 ===
2020 California State Senate 31st district
Primary election
Party	Candidate	Votes	%
Democratic	Richard Roth (incumbent)	106,435	98.9
Republican	Rod D. Taylor (write-in)	959	0.9
Libertarian	John K. Farr (write-in)	189	0.2
Total votes		107,583	100.0
General election
Democratic	Richard Roth (incumbent)	216,910	59.0
Republican	Rod D. Taylor	150,734	41.0
Total votes		367,644	100.0
Democratic hold			

=== 2016 ===
2016 California State Senate 31st district
Primary election
Party	Candidate	Votes	%
Democratic	Richard Roth (incumbent)	81,504	61.2
Republican	Richard Reed	51,755	38.8
Total votes		133,259	100.0
General election
Democratic	Richard Roth (incumbent)	167,574	60.5
Republican	Richard Reed	109,238	39.5
Total votes		276,812	100.0
Democratic hold			

=== 2012 ===
2012 California State Senate 31st district
Primary election
Party	Candidate	Votes	%
Republican	Jeff Miller	38,641	51.1
Democratic	Richard Roth	21,812	28.8
Democratic	Steve Clute	15,191	20.1
Total votes		75,644	100.0
General election
Democratic	Richard Roth	133,882	55.3
Republican	Jeff Miller	108,320	44.7
Total votes		242,202	100.0
Democratic gain from Republican			

=== 2008 ===
2008 California State Senate 31st district
Party	Candidate	Votes	%
Republican	Robert Dutton (incumbent)	186,191	58.7
Democratic	Ameenah Fuller	130,973	41.3
Independent	Denise Sternberg (write-in)	5	0.0
Total votes		317,169	100.0
Republican hold			

=== 2004 ===
2004 California State Senate 31st district
Party	Candidate	Votes	%
Republican	Robert Dutton	170,900	59.5
Democratic	Marjorie Mikels	116,312	40.5
Total votes		287,212	100.0
Republican hold			

=== 2000 ===
2000 California State Senate 31st district
Party	Candidate	Votes	%
Republican	Jim Brulte (incumbent)	153,745	58.8
Democratic	Michael D. Rayburn	97,931	37.5
Libertarian	Fritz R. Ward	9,851	3.8
Total votes		261,527	100.0
Republican hold			

=== 1996 ===
1996 California State Senate 31st district
Party	Candidate	Votes	%
Republican	Jim Brulte	143,537	56.2
Democratic	Gary George	103,217	41.8
Total votes		246,754	100.0
Republican hold			

=== 1992 ===
1992 California State Senate 31st district
Party	Candidate	Votes	%
Republican	Bill Leonard (incumbent)	192,171	99.9
No party	Gary R. Biggs (write-in)	119	0.1
No party	Jeffrey A. Schmidt (write-in)	38	0.0
Total votes		192,328	100.0
Republican hold			

=== 1990 (special) ===
1990 California State Senate 31st district special election Vacancy resulting from the resignation of William Campbell
Primary election
Party	Candidate	Votes	%
Republican	Bill Leonard	15,952	23.3
Republican	Gil Ferguson	14,762	21.5
Republican	Ron Isles	12,236	17.9
Republican	Gary G. Miller	10,618	15.5
Democratic	Janice Graham	9,591	14.0
Democratic	Bradley McFadden	3,136	4.6
Democratic	Thomas M. Whaling	1,529	2.2
American Independent	Robert W. Lewis	702	1.0
Total votes		68,526	100.0
General election
Republican	Bill Leonard	34,345	60.9
Democratic	Janice Graham	20,142	35.7
American Independent	Robert W. Lewis	1,932	3.4
Total votes		56,419	100.0
Republican hold			

== See also ==
- California State Senate
- California State Senate districts
- Districts in California
