= Benjamin F. Tuttle =

American politician

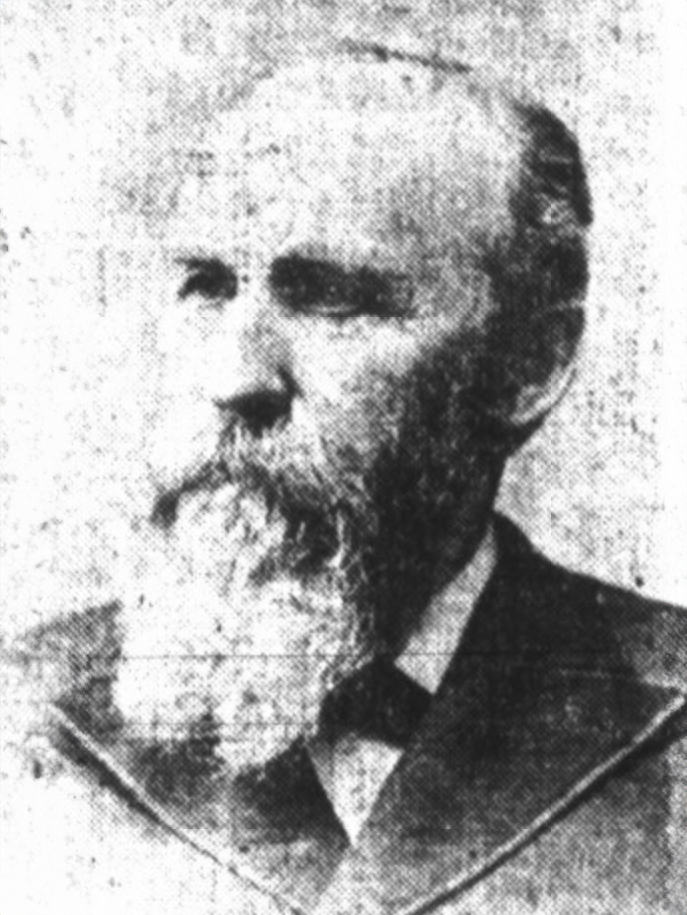
- Tuttle in 1907

Member of the California State Assembly from the 21st district
- In office 1877 – April 1, 1878

20th President pro tempore of the California State Senate
- In office February 27, 1875 – April 3, 1876
- Preceded by: William Irwin
- Succeeded by: Edward J. Lewis

Member of the California State Senate
- In office 1875–1877
- Constituency: 21st district
- In office 1875–1871
- Preceded by: William Burnet
- Constituency: 19th district

Personal details
- Born: Benjamin Franklin Tuttle; August 29, 1825 or 1827 Paris, Maine, U.S.
- Died: September 18, 1907 (age 80 or 82) Petaluma, California, U.S.
- Party: Democratic
- Spouse: Anna Marie Russell
- Children: 3

Benjamin Franklin Tuttle (August 29, 1825 – September 18, 1907) was an American pioneer, politician, and member of the Democratic Party who served in the California State Assembly and California State Senate, serving as the Senate's 20th president pro tempore.

== Biography ==
Tuttle was born in Paris, Maine in 1825 or 1827. As a child he also lived in Skowhegan and attended the Bloomfield Academy. Tuttle left for California by ship on October 2, 1849, from Bath, Maine and arrived in San Francisco on March 28, 1850, after having made stops in Rio de Janeiro and Valparaíso.

Tuttle worked a miner, furniture manufacturer, and steamboat builder in California until briefly returning to Maine in June 1855. In Maine, he married his wife Anna Marie Russell, and was a nominee for the Maine Legislature in 1857. He continued to work as a furniture manufacturer after returning to San Francisco, and then settled in Petaluma in 1859 where he manufactured doors, sash windows, and blinds. He also ran a furniture and carpet store in Petaluma from 1863 to 1875. From 1861 to 1867, Tuttle was also a trustee of the California Fur Manufacturing Company of San Francisco.

Between 1869 and 1871, Tuttle was a member of Petaluma's City Board of Education. He was also elected Petaluma's Justice of the Peace, but declined to fill the role.

Following his political career in the California State Legislature, he remained in Petaluma, and died in Santa Clara at his son-in-law's house. He is buried in Cypress Lawn Memorial Park.

== Political career ==
Tuttle was elected to the California State Senate's 19th district in 1871 to fill the term of the desceased William Burnet. Tuttle served as chairman of the Committee on Education in his first term. He was reelected in 1873 and sat on the Education and Finance committees, and was responsible for the Tuttle School Bill, which helped fund public schools throughout the state. On June 24th, 1875, Tuttle was elected president of the Sonoma County Democratic Party. In 1875, Tuttle was reelected to the Senate, this time from the 21st district, and was elected President pro tempore, with the support of senate Democrats and independents.

In 1877 Tuttle was elected to the State Assembly. He served as chairman of the Committee on Corporations, and sat on the Education, Ways and Means committee, and the special committee on Banks and Banking. He resigned from the State Assembly on April 1st, 1878.

While in the legislature, Tuttle was also the author of the Tuttle Minor Liquor Act. Tuttle was also a member of the California Railroad Commission from April 10th, 1878 to January 1880.

While in the legislature, Tuttle was mentioned by the Sonoma Democrat newspaper as a possible candidate for Governor. He was also mentioned by the Marysville Daily Appeal as a candidate for State Controller although he was not the eventual nominee.

== Personal life ==
Tuttle was Episcopalian and had three children. He was a York Rite Freemason and was the Most Excellent Grand High Priest of the lodge at Petaluma.

Preceded by William Irwin	President pro tempore of the California State Senate; 1875–1876	Succeeded by Edward J. Lewis
