= Senator Boynton =

Senator Boynton may refer to:

- Albert E. Boynton (1875–1945), California State Senate
- James S. Boynton (1833–1902), Georgia State Senate
