= Lansing B. Mizner =

American lawyer, diplomat, & politician (1825–1893)

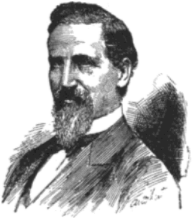

Minister to Central America
- In office June 4, 1889 – November 1890
- President: Benjamin Harrison
- Preceded by: Henry Cook Hall
- Succeeded by: Romualdo Pacheco

16th President pro tempore of the California State Senate
- In office December 2, 1867 – March 30, 1868
- Preceded by: S. P. Wright
- Succeeded by: Edward J. Lewis

Member of the California State Senate from the 17th district
- In office 1865–1867

Associate Justice of the Solano County Court of Sessions
- In office 1849–1851

Personal details
- Born: December 5, 1825 Monroe County, Illinois, U.S.
- Died: December 9, 1893 (aged 68) Yountville, California, U.S.
- Children: Addison Mizner; Wilson Mizner
- Occupation: Attorney, politician, land developer, diplomat

Lansing Bond Mizner (December 5, 1825 – December 9, 1893) was an American lawyer, diplomat, and politician. Mizner served as President of the California Senate and was US Minister (ambassador) to Costa Rica, El Salvador, Guatemala, Honduras and Nicaragua.

== Early life ==
Lansing B. Mizner was born on December 5, 1825, in Monroe County, Illinois, son of Henry Caldwell Mizner, who died when Lansing was 4 years old. Brigadier General John Kemp Mizner was his first cousin. His stepfather, James Semple, was fluent in the Spanish language and was appointed Chargé d'affaires to the Republic of New Granada (present-day Colombia and Panama, and pieces of neighboring countries). The family lived in Bogotá, Colombia for five years (1837–1842), during which Lansing also became fluent in Spanish. He studied at Shurtleff College.

== Career ==
He arrived in California by way of New Orleans and Panama May 20, 1843 (not 1849), settled at Benicia, and became a partner in the general merchandise company of Semple, Robinson & Co. He was admitted to the bar the same year. At the age of 22 he joined the United States Army, and served in the Mexican War on the staff of General Shields. He was a member of the Society of California Pioneers. His adult home was in Benicia, California,

He served as the first Collector of Customs for the Northern District of California (San Francisco to the Oregon border). When the state government was formed in 1849, he was elected the Associate Justice of the Solano County Court of Sessions. He was elected as a California State Senator in the 1865 and 1867 California Senates, and served as Chairman of the Commerce and Navigation and the Swamp Land Committees, and eventually President. Afterwards, he worked for Benjamin Harrison's 1888 presidential campaign.

== Minister to Central America ==
During the administration of President Benjamin Harrison, Mizner was appointed in 1889 Minister to Central America, in essence the ambassador to Costa Rica, El Salvador, Guatemala (where he was based), Honduras, and Nicaragua (Panama at that time was part of Colombia). He was fluent in Spanish. When he traveled to Guatemala to begin his duties he was accompanied by his sons, the future architect Addison Mizner and future playwright Wilson Mizner. He lasted in the job slightly more than a year.

Mizner's first rebuke, from an Acting Secretary of State, was for calling for a union of the five Central American republics for protection from the more powerful Mexico to the north and Colombia to the south (Mexico and Colombia had both protested). There was a complicated incident in which American arms were being shipped to El Salvador (which had just had a coup d'état), and Guatemala, having martial law, objected. In July 1890, exiled Guatemalan General Juan Martín Barrundia was on an American ship scheduled to stop at Guatemalan ports. Mizner, unable to communicate with Washington, agreed to the Guatemalan government's request he be seized. Resisting arrest, Barrundia was killed on this American ship by a bullet from one of the Guatemalan policemen who boarded the American ship. This was too much for the US government, and he was terminated in November 1890, by Secretary of State James G. Blaine. President Benjamin Harrison justified Mizner's dismissal in his 1890 Annual Message. State Department papers also detail the incident. Barrundia left a widow and several daughters, one of whom visited Mizner's office before his departure and shot at him. Barrundia's widow Transito Hurtarte appealed to the Department of State for damages, which the US government refused to grant.

== Family ==
He built a house in Benicia and kept a small farm on what is now East L St. near First St. (where the Benicia Public Library is currently). He installed the first flush toilet in Benicia, which the children would show off to their friends. His wife was Ella Watson Mizner. He had seven children, one daughter Minnie, married to Horace Blanchard Chase, who later would found Stag's Leap Winery, and six boys: William, Lansing, Edgar, the architect Addison, Harvey, and Wilson. He died aged 68, of heart disease, at the residence of his daughter, at Yountville, in Napa County.
