= Senator Flint (disambiguation) =

Frank Putnam Flint (1862–1929) was a U.S. Senator from California from 1905 to 1911. Senator Flint may also refer to

- Dutee Wilcox Flint (1882–1961), Rhode Island State Senate
- Edwin Flint (1814–1891), Wisconsin State Senate
- Rockwell J. Flint (1842–1933), Wisconsin State Senate
- Thomas Flint Jr. (California politician) (1857–1936), California State Senate
- Waldo Flint (1820–1900), Wisconsin State Senate
- Wilson G. Flint (died 1867), California State Senate
