= Arthur H. Breed Sr. =

American politician (1865–1953)

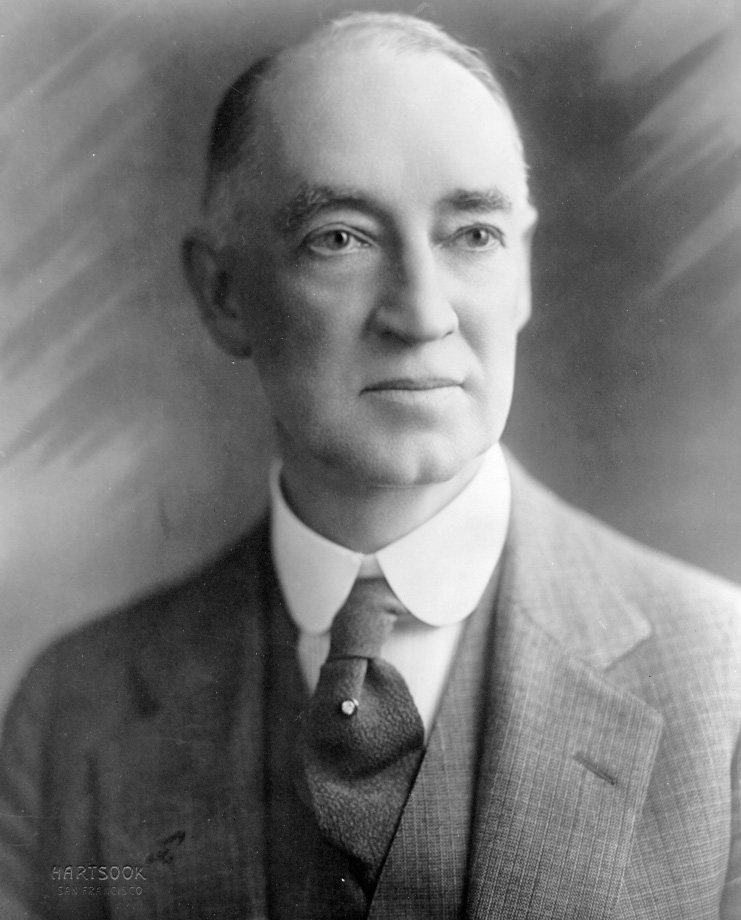
- Portrait by Fred Hartsook, c. 1920s

33rd President pro tempore of the California State Senate
- In office January 8, 1917 – July 26, 1933
- Preceded by: Newton W. Thompson
- Succeeded by: William P. Rich

Member of the California State Senate
- In office January 6, 1913 – January 7, 1935
- Preceded by: John Walter Stetson
- Succeeded by: William Knowland
- Constituency: 15th district (1913–1931); 16th district (1931–1933)

Personal details
- Born: Arthur Hastings Breed; November 27, 1865 San Francisco, California, U.S.
- Died: April 28, 1953 (age 87) Piedmont, California, U.S.
- Party: Republican
- Spouse: Caroline M. Hall (m. 1893; died 1950)
- Children: 4, including Arthur Jr.

Arthur Hastings Breed Sr. (November 27, 1865 – April 28, 1953) was an American politician who served in the California State Senate as a Republican, representing the 15th and 16th districts. He was also the longest serving President pro tempore of the Senate, holding the role for 16 years between 1917 and 1933.

== Life ==
Born in San Francisco in 1865, Breed became involved in buying sand lots in the city from a young age. After the Panic of 1893, Breed was left with large amounts of debt from his mortgages and was told by a friend that he should run for auditor and assessor of Oakland to earn some extra money. Breed also served as Chair of the Republican committee of Alameda County.

=== California State Senate ===
Breed was elected to the state Senate in 1912 from the 15th district, though he was later redistricted to the 16th district. In 1917 he became President pro tempore of the Senate and held the post for 16 years until 1933, being the longest person to hold that role. As President pro tempore of the Senate, he was second in the order of succession to the Governor's office, and as such served as acting Lieutenant Governor three times when the Lieutenant Governor's office was vacated during his tenure, though he is not included in lists of Lieutenant governors.

In the senate, Breed authored the California Motor Vehicle Act of 1913 which required all motor vehicle operators to have a license.

== Personal life ==
Breed was married to Caroline M. Hall, and had four children, including Arthur H. Breed Jr. who was a State Assemblyman and state senator.

Preceded by Newton W. Thompson	President pro tempore of the California State Senate; 1917-1933	Succeeded by William P. Rich
