= William P. Rich =

American politician (1880–1965)

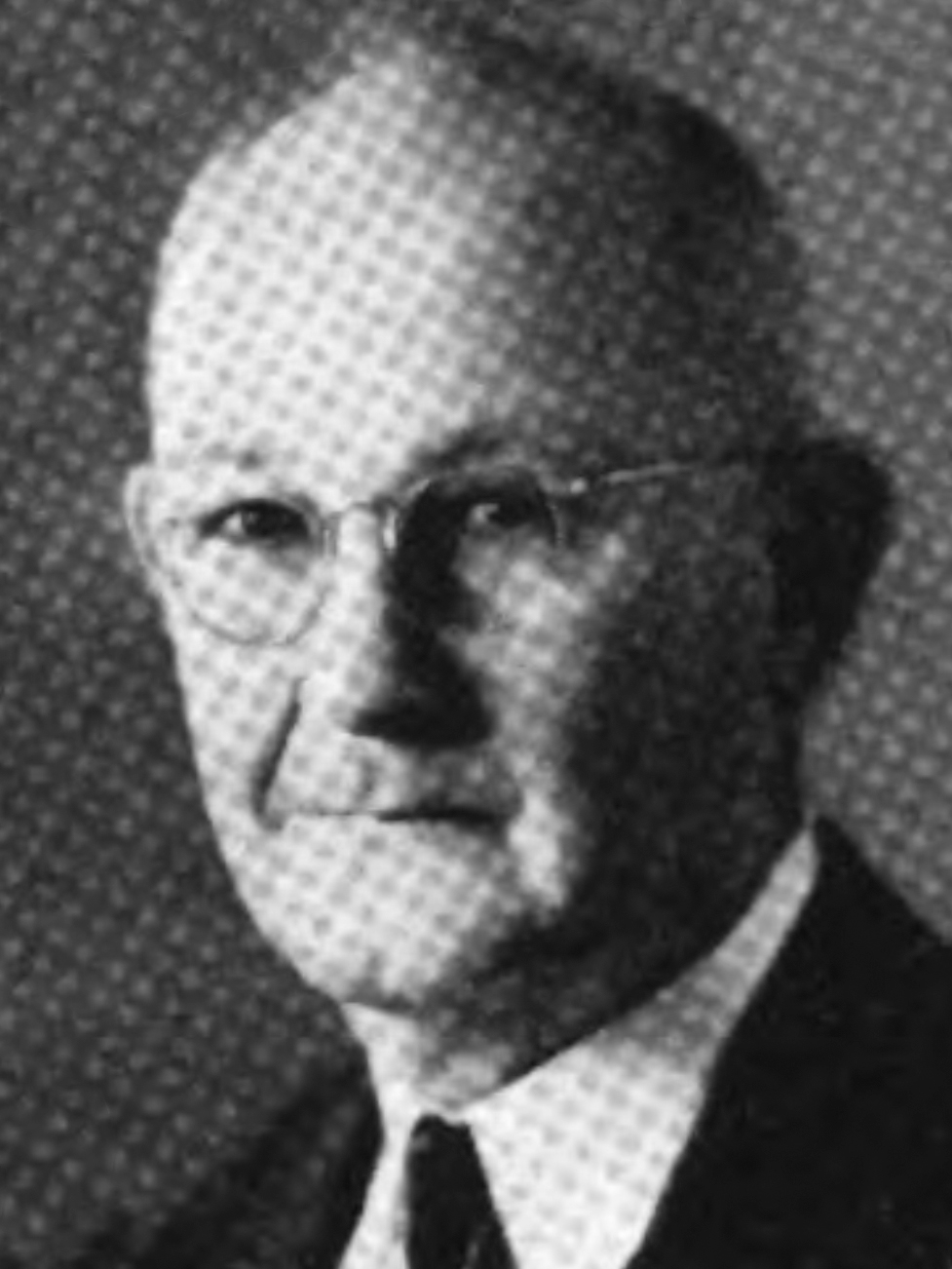

34th and 36th President pro tempore of the California State Senate
- In office January 6, 1941 – January 4, 1943
- Preceded by: Jerrold L. Seawell
- Succeeded by: Jerrold L. Seawell
- In office January 7, 1935 – June 20, 1939
- Preceded by: Arthur H. Breed Sr.
- Succeeded by: Jerrold L. Seawell

Member of the California Senate from the 10th district
- In office 1930–1950
- Preceded by: Frank S. Boggs
- Succeeded by: Edward C. Johnson

Personal details
- Born: January 16, 1880 Arkansas, U.S.
- Died: May 21, 1965 (aged 85) near Marysville, California, U.S.
- Party: Republican
- Occupation: Attorney

William P. Rich (January 16, 1880–May 21, 1965) was an American attorney and politician who served in the California State Senate as a Republican. Rich also served two non-consecutive terms as the Senate's President pro tempore.

== Biography ==
William P. Rich was born on January 16, 1880, in Arkansas. He arrived in California sometime prior to 1910, settling in Marysville. Rich, an attorney, founded a law office there, today known as Rich, Fuidge, Bordsen & Galyean. Between 1910 and 1912, Rich was Deputy County Clerk of Yuba County, and between 1912 and 1915 he was Yuba County's Treasurer and Tax Collector. A Republican, Rich was elected to the California State Senate's 10th district in 1930. He would go on to be re-elected to the Senate four times until 1946.

While a senator in 1934, Rich was described by the The Healdsburg Enterprise as a "progressive" and ally of then Governor Frank Merriam. Rich would be elected the 34th President pro tempore of the state Senate in 1935, holding that office until 1939, when he was injured in a car accident while returning to Sacramento after attending the funeral of fellow state Senator John B. McColl. Rich's neck was broken, and he was sworn into his senate term from a hospital bed; his absence from the opening session of the legislature having cost him the president pro tempore position for that term.

Rich would be reelected 36th president pro tempore the following session, in 1941. He is one of only three people to have held the office non-consecutively, along with Jerrold L. Seawell, who served inbetween Rich's two terms and immediately after his second, and Edward J. Lewis.

Rich died near Marysville on May 21, 1965, at the age of 85. He is buried at Sierra View Memorial Park in Yuba County.

Preceded by Arthur H. Breed Sr.	President pro tempore of the California State Senate; 1935–1939	Succeeded by Jerrold L. Seawell
Preceded by Jerrold L. Seawell	President pro tempore of the California State Senate; 1941–1943	Succeeded by Jerrold L. Seawell
