= William Irwin (California politician) =

American politician and Governor of California

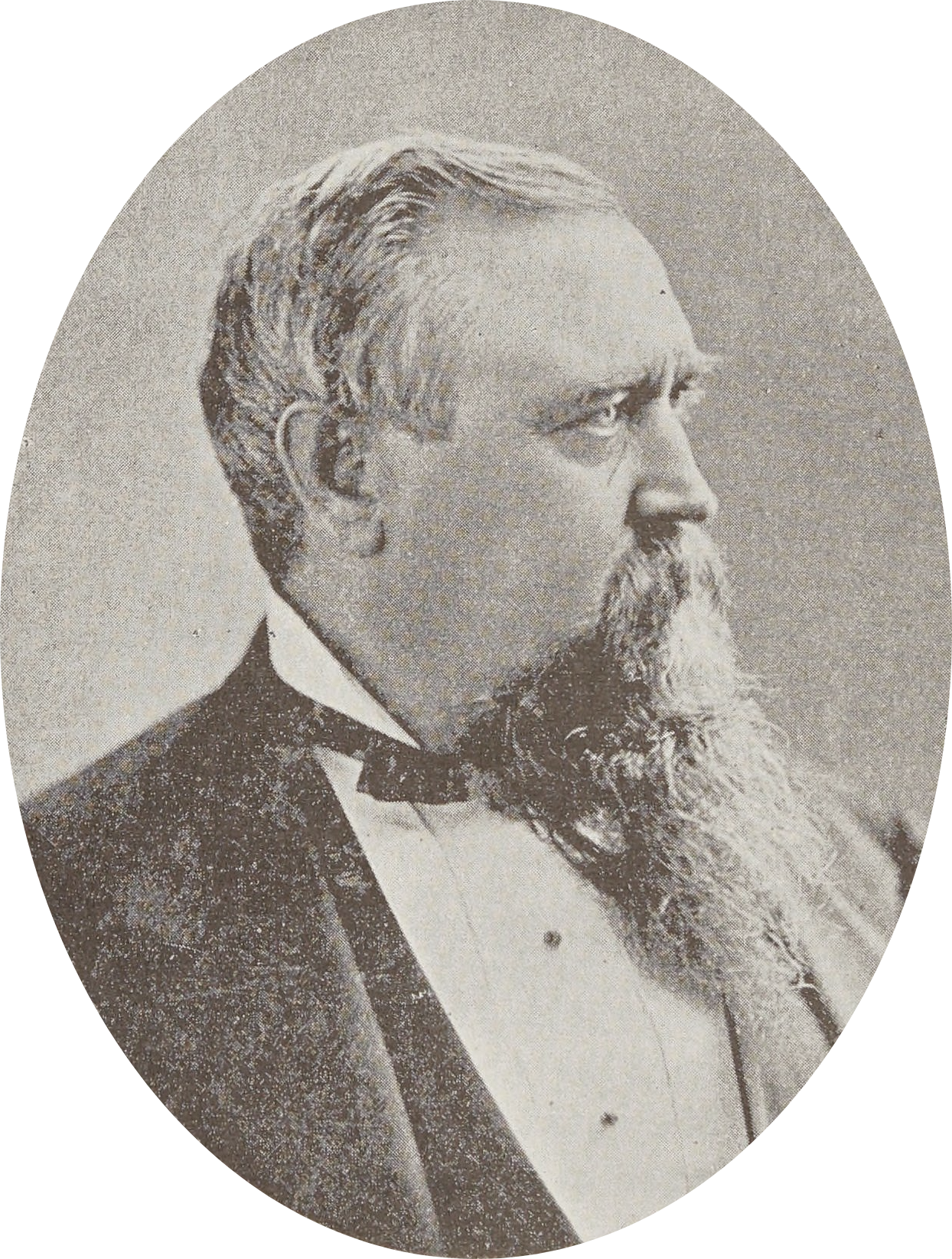

13th Governor of California
- In office December 9, 1875 – January 8, 1880
- Lieutenant: James A. Johnson
- Preceded by: Romualdo Pacheco
- Succeeded by: George C. Perkins

13th Lieutenant Governor of California
- Acting; February 27, 1875 – December 9, 1875
- Governor: Romualdo Pacheco
- Preceded by: Romualdo Pacheco
- Succeeded by: James A. Johnson

19th President pro tempore of the California State Senate
- In office March 13, 1874 – February 27, 1875
- Preceded by: James T. Farley
- Succeeded by: Benjamin F. Tuttle

Member of the California Senate from the 28th district
- In office December 6, 1869 – December 6, 1875
- Preceded by: E. Wadsworth
- Succeeded by: Wiley J. Tinnin

Member of the California State Assembly from the 28th district
- In office January 6, 1862 – December 7, 1863
- Preceded by: Seat established
- Succeeded by: R. C. Scott

Personal details
- Born: July 12, 1827 Oxford, Ohio, U.S.
- Died: March 15, 1886 (aged 58) San Francisco, California, U.S.
- Party: Democratic
- Other political affiliations: National Union (1861–1865)
- Spouse: Amelia Elizabeth Cassidy
- Children: 1
- Profession: Educator, laborer

William Irwin (July 12, 1827 – March 15, 1886) was an American politician from the Democratic Party who served as the 13th governor of California between 1875 and 1880. He previously served as acting lieutenant governor for nine months in 1875.

== Biography ==
Born in Butler County, Ohio, Irwin graduated in 1848 from Marietta College in Marietta, where he later became an instructor. After moving to California, Irwin worked in various private industries and in 1865 was a candidate for Siskiyou County Tax Collector but lost. He was eventually elected to the California State Assembly, representing the 28th district. He became the editor of a newspaper and then was elected to the California State Senate. He served as President pro tempore of the Senate and as such, became acting lieutenant governor in 1875 when Lieutenant Governor Romualdo Pacheco became governor. Irwin was elected governor in his own right that same year. He died in 1886 in San Francisco, California and was interred in the Sacramento Historic City Cemetery in Sacramento, California.

As governor, Irwin appointed young journalist Henry George to the office of State Inspector of Gas Meters in 1876, which lifted George and his family out of destitution and allowed him to write Progress and Poverty.

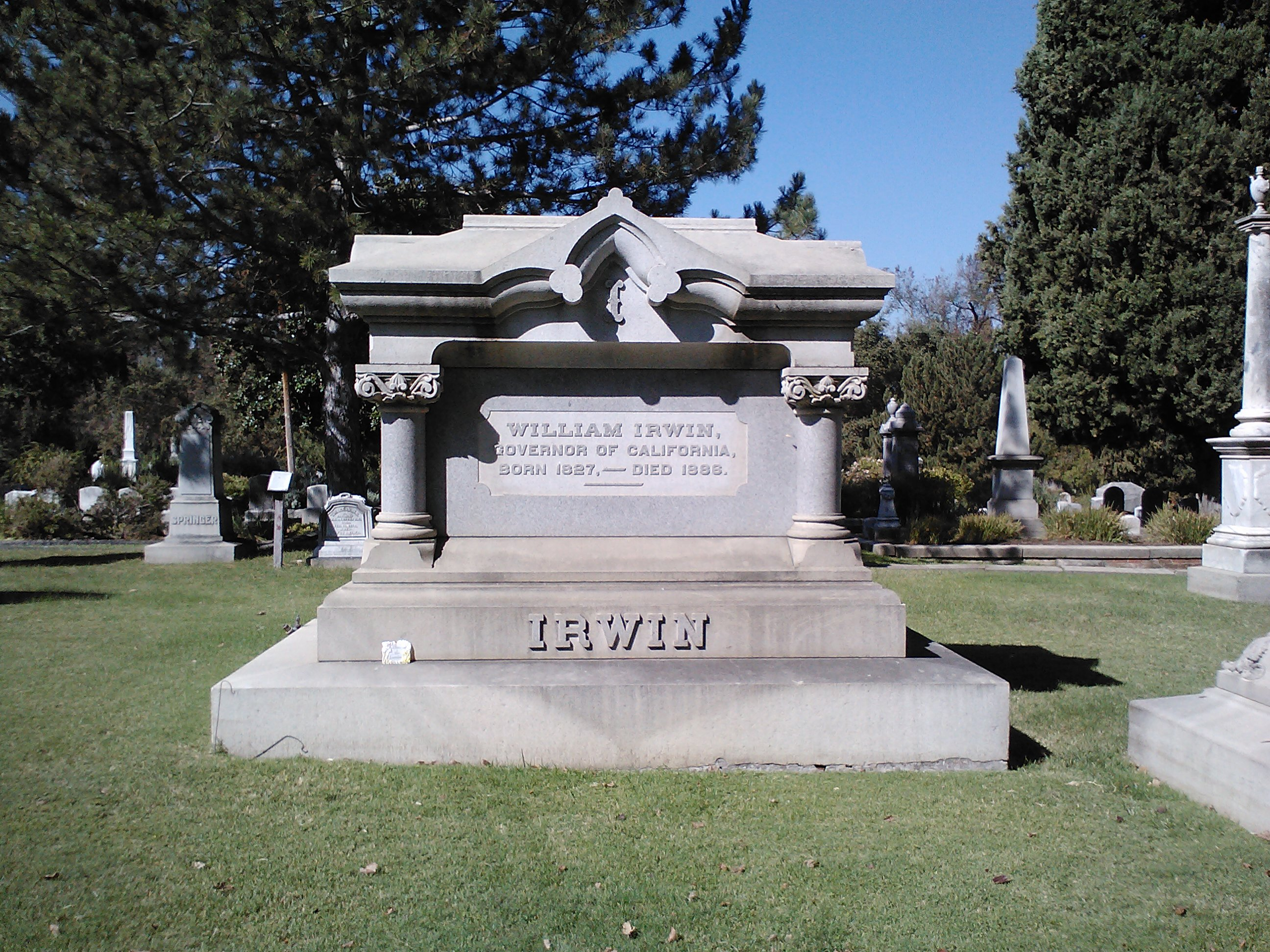
Irwin Gravesite

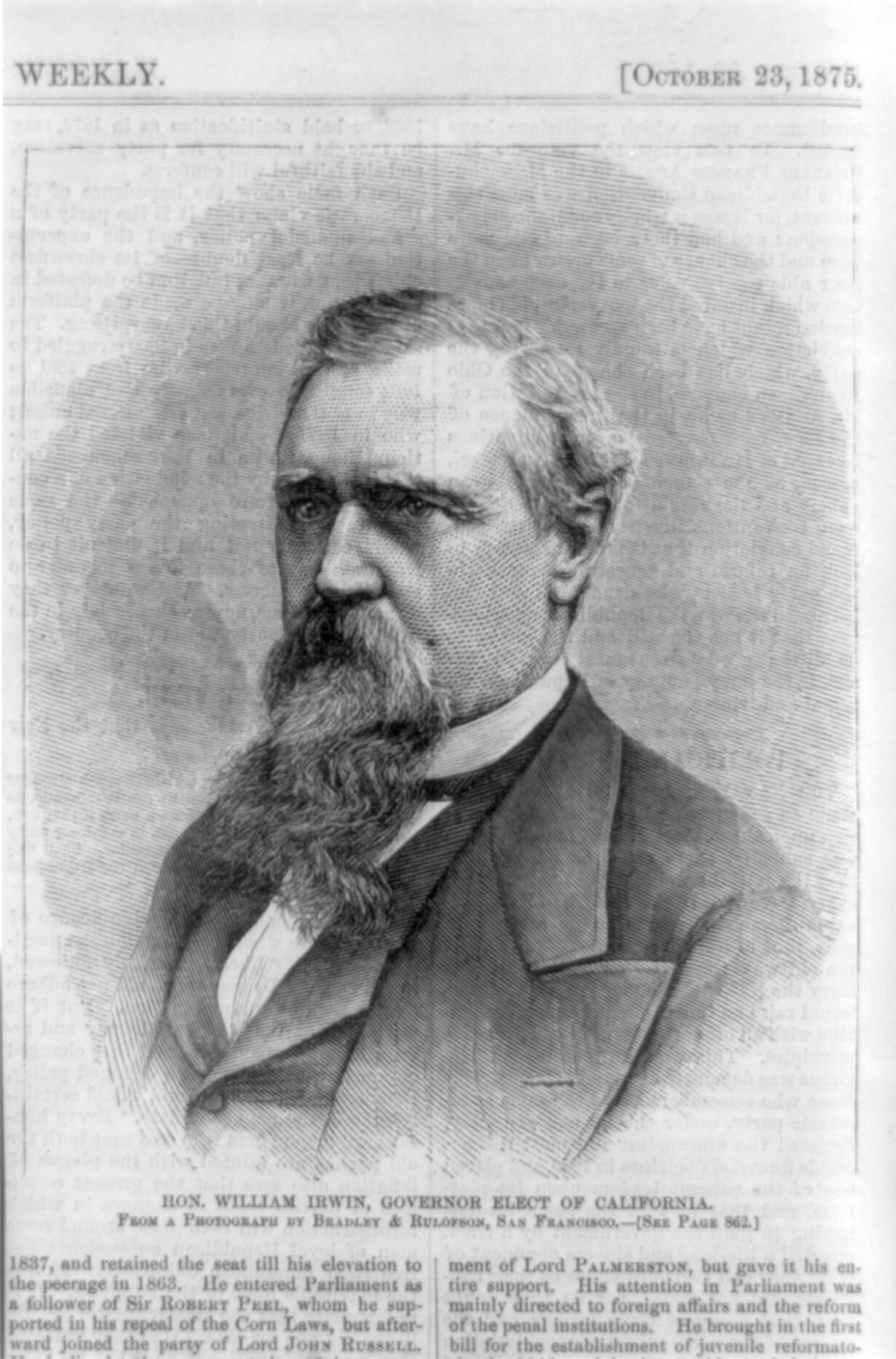
Engraving of Irwin in Harper's Weekly, 1875

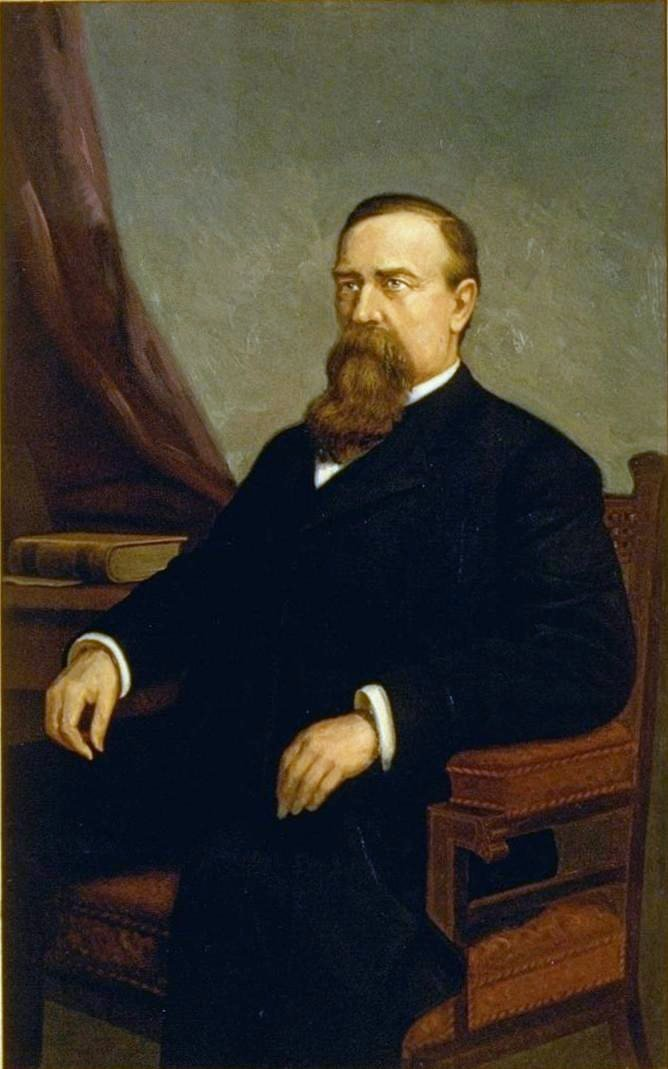
Irwin's official gubernatorial portrait

Irwin later in life

Party political offices
Preceded by Henry Huntly Haight	Democratic nominee for Governor of California; 1875	Succeeded by Hugh J. Glenn
Political offices
Preceded by District created	California State Assemblyman, 28th District; 1862–1863 (with Caleb N. Thornbury, then Benjamin F. Varney)	Succeeded by S. L. Littlefield, R. C. Scott
Preceded by Romualdo Pacheco; Lieutenant Governor	Acting Lieutenant Governor of California; 1875	Succeeded by James A. Johnson; Lieutenant Governor
Preceded by Romualdo Pacheco	Governor of California; 1875–1880	Succeeded by George Perkins
