= Court of Session (disambiguation) =

The Court of Session is the supreme civil court of Scotland

Court of Session may also refer to:

- Court of Sessions (California)
- Sessions Court, India and Malaysia
- Court of Session (Pakistan), the main Criminal Court of Pakistan
