= William Johnston (California politician) =

American politician (1829–1905)

Member of the California State Board of Equalization from the 2nd district
- In office 1881–1882
- Preceded by: Moses M. Drew
- Succeeded by: L. C. Morehouse

23rd President pro tempore of the California State Senate
- In office January 3, 1881 – April 1, 1882
- Preceded by: George F. Baker
- Succeeded by: R.F. del Valle

Member of the California State Senate from the 18th district
- In office 1879 – April 1, 1882

Member of the California State Assembly from the 16th district
- In office 1871–1872

Personal details
- Born: William Johnston; June 2, 1829 Allegheny County, Pennsylvania, U.S.
- Died: November 15, 1905 (76) Courtland, California, U.S.
- Party: Republican
- Spouse: Elizabeth S.
- Children: 6

William Johnston (June 2, 1829 – November 15, 1905) was an American politician who served in the California State Legislature and California Board of Equalization. Johnston was also President pro tempore of the California State Senate.

== Biography ==
Johnston was born in Allegheny County, Pennsylvania, on June 2nd, 1829. He was elected to the California State Assembly's 16th district in 1871, and to the State Senate's 18th district in 1879, and was reelected in 1880. Between 1881 and 1882, Johnston served as the 23rd President pro tempore of the State Senate. Johnston was also appointed to the California Board of Equalization's second district after incumbent Moses M. Drew resigned.

In 1886, Johnston was a candidate to be nominee for Lieutenant Governor but did not win the nomination.

Johnston once again ran for State Assembly in 1898, this time in the 22nd district, but failed to win. He died in Courtland, California on November 15, 1905.

== Personal life ==
Johnston was a Freemason.

Preceded by George F. Baker	President pro tempore of the California State Senate; 1881–1882	Succeeded by R.F. del Valle
