= Edward I. Wolfe =

British-American politician (1860–1922)

- Wolfe c. 1912

30th President pro tempore of the California State Senate
- In office January 2, 1905 – March 24, 1909
- Preceded by: Thomas Flint Jr.
- Succeeded by: Albert E. Boynton

Member of the California State Senate
- In office October 8, 1914 – January 8, 1917
- Preceded by: Edwin Grant
- Succeeded by: Lester G. Burnett
- Constituency: 19th district
- In office January 4, 1897 – January 6, 1913
- Preceded by: William J. Biggy
- Succeeded by: Frederick C. Gerdes
- Constituency: 21st district

Personal details
- Born: Edward I. Wolfe; March 15, 1860 Hull, England, United Kingdom
- Died: January 26, 1922 (aged 61) San Francisco, California, U.S.
- Party: Republican
- Children: 1

Edward I. Wolfe (March 15, 1860 – January 26, 1922) was a British-born American politician from California who served in the California State Senate as a Republican. Wolfe also served as President pro tempore of the Senate.

== Biography ==
Wolfe was born in Hull, England. He attended high school in San Francisco, California. For seven years after high school he was the private secretary to the president of the Black Diamond Coal Mining Company, and became a U.S. citizen on his 21st birthday. In the 1880s he was a clerk in the court of Superior Court judge James V. Coffey.

Wolfe was married and had one child, and he was "prominently connected with fraternal societies."

Wolfe died in San Francisco on January 26, 1922, at the age of 61.

== Political career ==
In 1892, Wolfe was elected to the Republican County Committee of San Francisco and was later also elected its secretary. In 1886 he was Republican nominee for the State Senate but did not win. At the time he was the youngest person nominated for the State Senate. In 1887, Wolfe was appointed Clerk of the probate court of San Francisco, and in 1889 he was appointed as the head of the Real Estate Development Department of the San Francisco Sheriff's Office. In 1891, he was nominated at the State Republican Convention to be a Clerk of the California Supreme Court but was defeated by six votes. Between 1891 and 1893, Wolfe served as Secretary of the San Francisco New City Hall Commission.

In 1910, Wolfe was a proponent of California's Proposition 52 ("creating Panama Pacific International Exposition fund").

=== California State Senate ===
Wolfe was elected to the California State Senate's 21st district in 1896. He was reelected several times, holding the seat until 1913. In 1912, Wolfe ran in the State Senate's 19th district, but did not win. He ran again in the same seat in 1914 and won, serving one term. From 1905 to 1909, Wolfe served as the 30th President pro tempore of the California State Senate.

In 1911, he voted "no" on two major constitutional amendments: SCA 8 which granted women the right to vote, and SCA 23, which gave voters the ability to recall elected officials. He was one of only 5 senators and 17 legislators to vote "no" on the former, and one of only 4 senators and 11 legislators to vote "no" on the latter.

Preceded by Thomas Flint Jr.	President pro tempore of the California State Senate; 1905 – 1909	Succeeded by Albert E. Boynton
