= George F. Baker (politician) =

California state senator

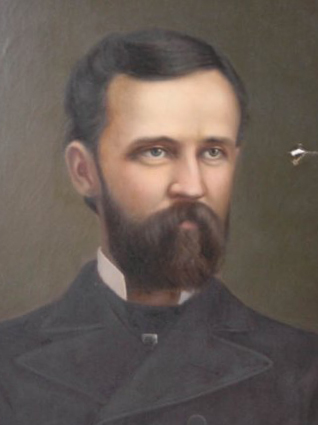
- Baker in 1880

22nd President pro tempore of the California State Senate
- In office April 16, 1880 – January 3, 1881
- Preceded by: Edward J. Lewis
- Succeeded by: William Johnston

Member of the California State Senate from the 7th district
- In office 1879–1882

Personal details
- Born: George Frank Baker; September 15, 1849 Cincinnati, Ohio, U.S.
- Died: March 11, 1882 (age 32) San Francisco, California, U.S.
- Party: Republican

George Frank Baker (September 15, 1849 – March 11, 1882) was an American politician who served in the California State Senate as a member of the Republican Party. He was also the 22nd President pro tempore of the Senate.

== Biography ==
Baker was born in Cincinnati, Ohio on September 15, 1849.

He was elected to the California State Senate's 7th district in 1879. During his term in the State Senate, he was elected President pro tempore. In 1880 he was President of the Republican Party State Convention. Baker was also a candidate for Congress in 1882 but died before the primary. Prior to his career in the state senate, Baker served as Santa Clara County Superintendent of Schools from 1871 to 1874.

Baker died in San Francisco on March 11, 1882.

== Personal life ==
Baker was an Odd Fellow.

Preceded by Edward J. Lewis	President pro tempore of the California State Senate; 1880–1881	Succeeded by William Johnston
