= President pro tempore of the California State Senate =

Leader of the California State Senate

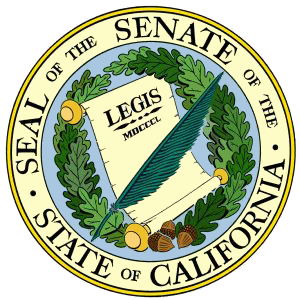
- Seal of the Senate of the State of California

- California State Flag

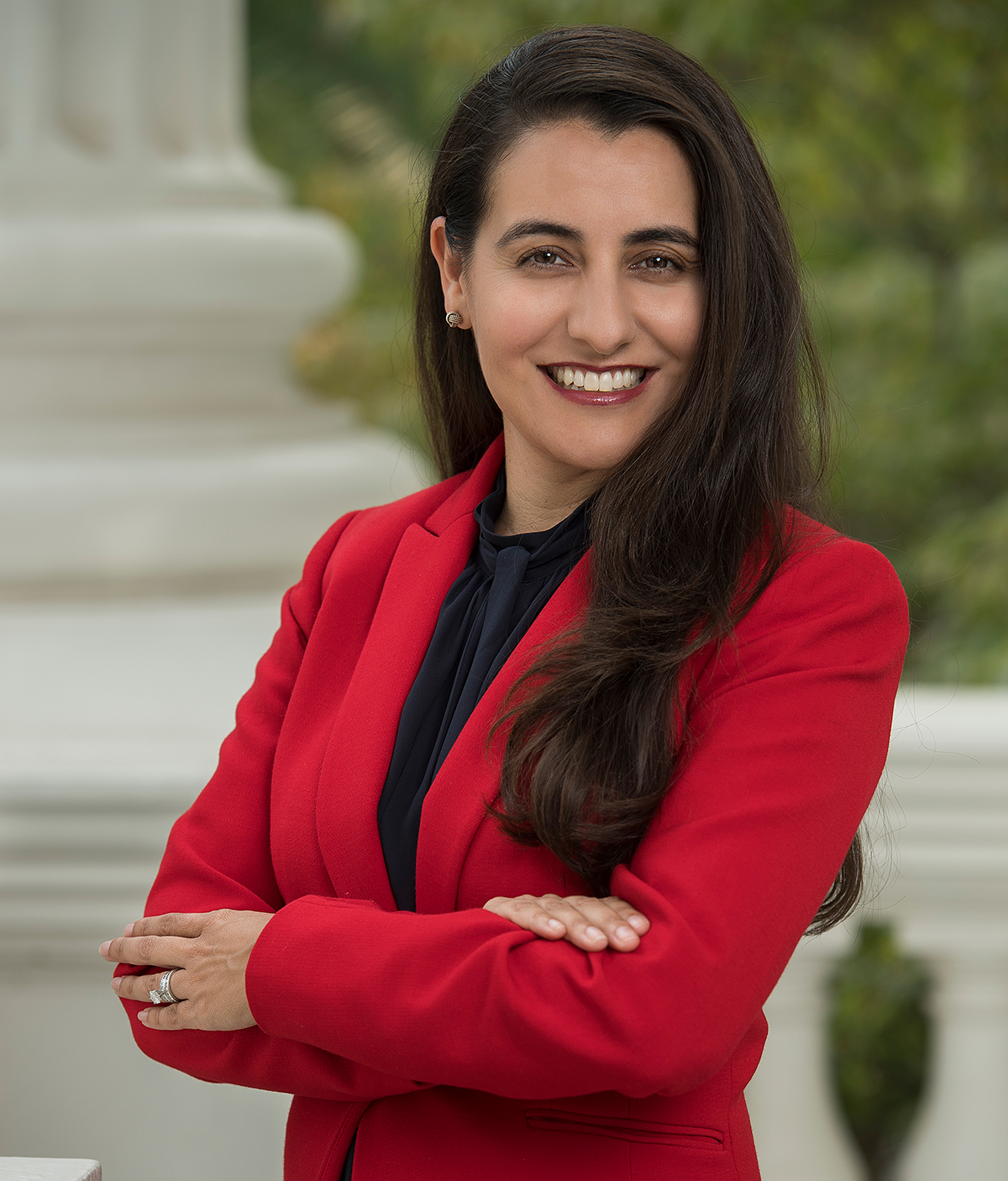
- Incumbent; Monique Limón since November 17, 2025
- Member of: California State Senate
- Term length: 2 years
- Inaugural holder: E. Kirby Chamberlain
- Formation: 1849
- Succession: Second
- Unofficial names: President Pro Tem

The president pro tempore of the California State Senate (President Pro Tem) is the chief executive and highest-ranking member of the California State Senate and serves as chair of the Senate Rules Committee. The Pro Tem is chosen at the beginning of each two-year session, via election by all the other senators-elect.

The current President pro tempore is Monique Limón, a Democratic member from the 21st district, who was sworn in on November 17, 2025.

== Powers and duties ==
The President pro tempore acts as the chair of the Senate while the President, the Lieutenant Governor of California, is absent during meetings, having the same powers of the president. If the President Pro Tempore is absent, another Senator appointed by the President pro tempore can act as chair. The President pro tempore has a responsibility to "secure the prompt and businesslike disposition of bills and other business before the Senate."

== List of presidents pro tempore of the California State Senate ==
No.	President pro tempore	Political party	District	Term start	Term end
1	E. Kirby Chamberlain (1805–1852)	Nonpartisan (Note: The 1st California State Legislature was nonpartisan and used the established counties as the legislative districts until January 9, 1851.)	Los Angeles–San Diego	December 15, 1849	January 9, 1851
2	Elcan Heydenfeldt (1821–1898)	Whig	6th–San Francisco	January 9, 1851	January 8, 1852
3	Benjamin F. Keene (1813–1856)	Democratic	12th–Placerville	January 8, 1852	January 2, 1854
3	Benjamin F. Keene (1813–1856)	Democratic	18th–Placerville (Note: Redistricted during term.)	January 8, 1852	January 2, 1854
4	Royal Sprague (1814–1872)	Democratic	13th–Shasta	January 1, 1855	May 7, 1855
5	Delos R. Ashley (1828–1873)	American	3rd–San Francisco	January 9, 1856	April 21, 1856
6	Samuel H. Dosh (1827–1861)	Democratic	13th–Shasta	January 5, 1857	April 29, 1857
7	Samuel A. Merritt (1827–1910)	Democratic	6th–Shasta	January 4, 1858	April 26, 1858
8	W. B. Dickinson (????–????)	Democratic	5th–Sacramento	January 3, 1859	April 19, 1859
9	Isaac N. Quinn (1795–1865)	Democratic	7th–San Rafael	January 2, 1860	January 19, 1860
10	Christopher J. Lansing (1828–1884)	Democratic	16th–Stockton	January 19, 1860	April 13, 1860
11	Richard Irwin (1828–1869)	Union Democratic	26th–Quincy	January 7, 1861	May 20, 1861
12	James M. Shafter (1816–1892)	Republican	24th–San Francisco	January 6, 1862	May 15, 1862
13	Addison M. Crane (1814–1889)	Union	9th–Squatterville	December 7, 1863	April 4, 1864
14	Ransom Burnell (1821–1880)	Union	14th–St. Helena	April 4, 1864	December 4, 1865
15	S. P. Wright (????–1874)	Union	27th–Santa Barbara	December 4, 1865	April 2, 1866
16	Lansing B. Mizner (1825–1893)	Union	17th–Tehama	December 2, 1867	March 30, 1868
17	Edward J. Lewis (1832–1881)	Democratic	25th–Red Bluff	December 6, 1869	April 1, 1872
18	James T. Farley (1829–1886)	Democratic	16th–Volcano	December 1, 1873	March 13, 1874
19	William Irwin (1827–1886)	Democratic	28th–San Francisco	March 13, 1874	February 27, 1875
20	Benjamin F. Tuttle (1825–1907)	Democratic	21st–San Francisco	February 27, 1875	April 3, 1876
21	Edward J. Lewis (1832–1881)	Democratic	25th–Tehama	December 3, 1877	April 16, 1880
22	George F. Baker (1849–1882)	Republican	7th–San Jose	April 16, 1880	January 3, 1881
23	William Johnston (1829–1905)	Republican	18th–Courtland	January 3, 1881	April 1, 1882
24	R. F. del Valle (1854–1938)	Democratic	2nd–Los Angeles	April 1, 1882	March 13, 1883
25	Benjamin Knight (1836–1905)	Democratic	6th–Santa Cruz	January 5, 1885	March 12, 1887
26	Stephen M. White (1853–1901)	Democratic	38th–Los Angeles	January 3, 1887	March 16, 1889
27	Thomas Fraser (1831–1902)	Republican	7th–Placerville	January 5, 1891	March 25, 1891
28	R. B. Carpenter (1831–1909)	Republican	33rd–Los Angeles	January 2, 1893	March 14, 1893
29	Thomas Flint Jr. (1857–1936)	Republican	33rd–Hollister	January 7, 1895	March 14, 1903
30	Edward I. Wolfe (1860–1920)	Republican	21st–San Francisco	January 2, 1905	March 24, 1909
31	Albert E. Boynton (1875–1945)	Republican	6th–Oroville	January 2, 1911	May 12, 1913
32	Newton W. Thompson (1865–1936)	Republican	35th–Alhambra	January 4, 1915	January 11, 1916
33	Arthur H. Breed Sr. (1865–1953)	Republican	15th–Oakland	January 8, 1917	July 26, 1933
33	Arthur H. Breed Sr. (1865–1953)	Republican	16th–Oakland	January 8, 1917	July 26, 1933
34	William P. Rich (1880–1965)	Republican	10th–Marysville	January 7, 1935	June 20, 1939
35	Jerrold L. Seawell (1897–1952)	Republican	7th–Roseville	January 2, 1939	June 14, 1941
36	William P. Rich (1880–1965)	Republican	10th–Marysville	January 6, 1941	January 4, 1943
37	Jerrold L. Seawell (1897–1952)	Republican	7th–Roseville	January 4, 1943	June 16, 1945
38	Harold J. Powers (1900–1996)	Republican	31st–Cedarville	January 6, 1947	October 5, 1953
39	Clarence C. Ward (1894–1955)	Republican	31st–Santa Barbara	March 1, 1954	May 9, 1955
40	Ben Hulse (1894–1961)	Republican	39th–Imperial	January 3, 1955	April 5, 1956
41	Hugh M. Burns (1902–1988)	Democratic	30th–Fresno	January 5, 1957	May 14, 1969
41	Hugh M. Burns (1902–1988)	Democratic	16th–Fresno	January 5, 1957	May 14, 1969
42	Howard Way (1913–2001)	Republican	15th– Exeter	May 14, 1969	February 10, 1970
43	Jack Schrade (1902–1992)	Republican	39th–El Cajon	February 10, 1970	November 30, 1970
44	James R. Mills (1927–2021)	Democratic	40th–San Diego	November 30, 1970	November 30, 1980
45	David Roberti (born 1939)	Democratic	23rd–Los Angeles	November 30, 1980	January 31, 1994
46	Bill Lockyer (born 1941)	Democratic	10th–Oakland	January 31, 1994	February 5, 1998
47	John Burton (1932–2025)	Democratic	3rd–San Francisco	February 5, 1998	November 30, 2004
48	Don Perata (born 1945)	Democratic	9th–Alameda	November 30, 2004	August 21, 2008
49	Darrell Steinberg (born 1959)	Democratic	6th–Sacramento	August 21, 2008	October 15, 2014
50	Kevin de León (born 1966)	Democratic	24th–Los Angeles	October 15, 2014	March 21, 2018
51	Toni Atkins (born 1962)	Democratic	39th–San Diego	March 21, 2018	February 5, 2024
52	Mike McGuire (born 1979)	Democratic	2nd–Healdsburg	February 5, 2024	November 17, 2025
53	Monique Limón (born 1979)	Democratic	21st–Santa Barbara	November 17, 2025	Incumbent

== See also ==
- California State Senate
- List of California state legislatures
- Speaker of the California State Assembly
- President of the Los Angeles City Council
