= Newton W. Thompson =

American politician (1865–1936)

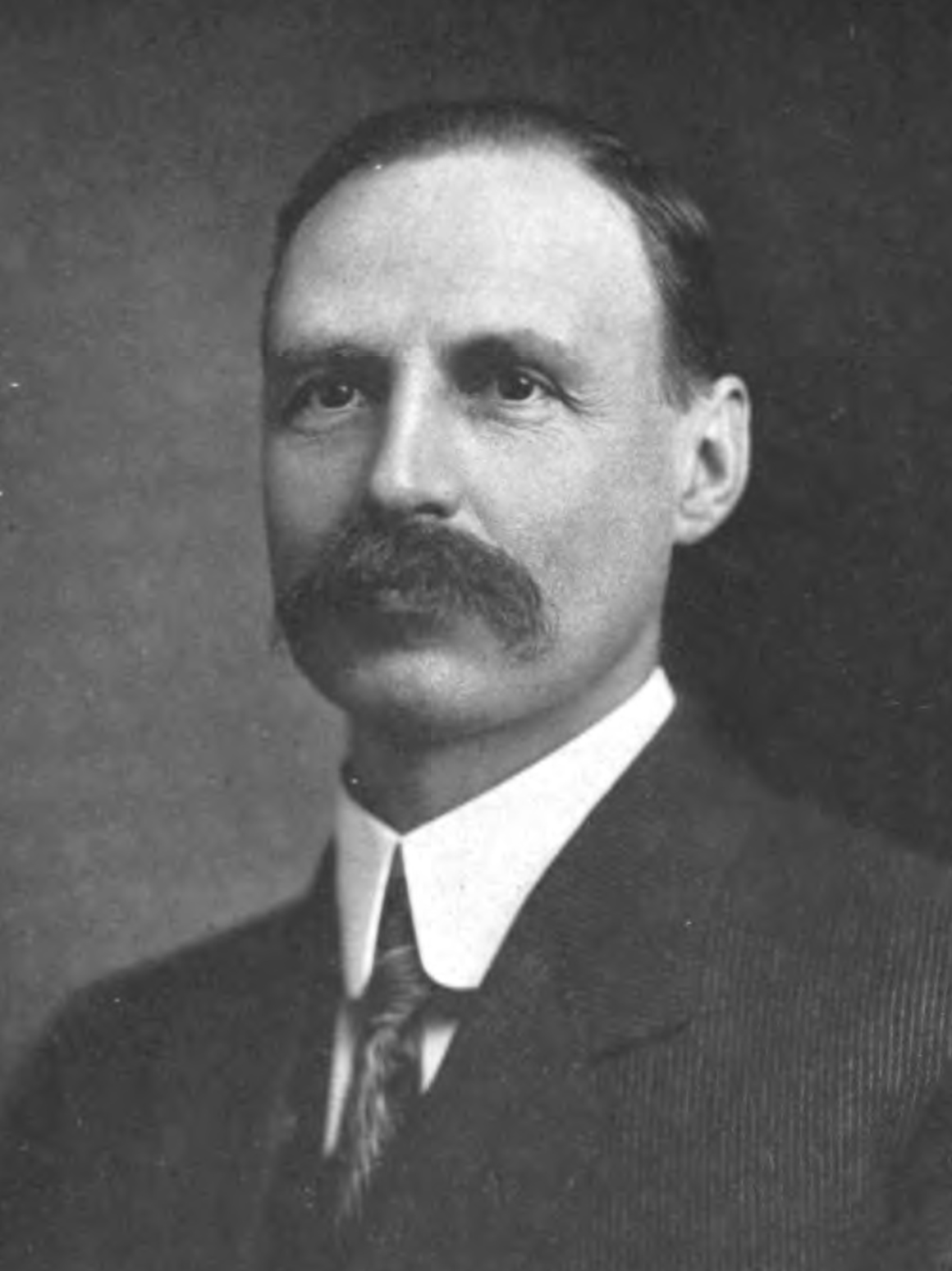
- Thompson in 1910

32nd President pro tempore of the California State Senate
- In office January 4, 1915 – January 11, 1916
- Preceded by: Albert E. Boynton
- Succeeded by: Arthur H. Breed Sr.

Member of the California Senate from the 35th district
- In office January 4, 1909 – January 8, 1917
- Preceded by: Howard A. Broughton
- Succeeded by: Egbert J. Gates

Member of the California State Assembly from the 69th district
- In office January 2, 1905 – January 4, 1909
- Preceded by: Edgar Whittlesey Camp
- Succeeded by: Harry Barndollar

Personal details
- Born: Newton Warner Thompson; September 16, 1865 Pulaski, New York, U.S.
- Died: October 27, 1936 (aged 71) Alhambra, California, U.S.
- Party: Republican

Newton Warner Thompson (September 16, 1865 – October 27, 1936) was an American politician who served in both houses of the California State Legislature from 1909 to 1917 as a Republican, and served a term as President pro tempore of the Senate from 1915 to 1916. In this capacity he also served as acting Governor of California in 1916.

== Biography ==
Thompson was born on September 16, 1865 in Pulaski, New York. He lived in Alhambra, California and served as the President of the Alhambra City Board of Trustees and as the President of the Alhambra City High School District Board. He is said to have been Alhambra's first mayor. He was also the chairman of a commission to revise the State Constitution.

In 1904, Thompson was elected to the California State Assembly as a Republican, representing the 69th district. He was reelected in 1906.

Thompson was elected to the California State Senate's 35th district in 1908, and was reelected in 1912. Between 1915 and 1916, he was President pro tempore of the California State Senate. While Thompson was President pro tempore, then-Governor Hiram Johnson attended a convention outside of California, leaving Lieutenant Governor John Morton Eshleman as acting Governor, who died shortly thereafter. This left Thompson as acting Governor. In that position, Thompson signed an order sending California troops into Mexico led by General John J. Pershing.

Later in life, Thompson was vice president and title officer of the Title Insurance and Trust Company. Thompson died in Alhambra, California on October 27, 1936, at the age of 71.

== Personal life ==
Thompson was a Freemason and was Senior Warden of the lodge in Alhambra.

Preceded by Albert E. Boynton	President pro tempore of the California State Senate; 1915 – 1916	Succeeded by Arthur H. Breed Sr.
