= Albert E. Boynton =

American attorney and politician (1875–1945)

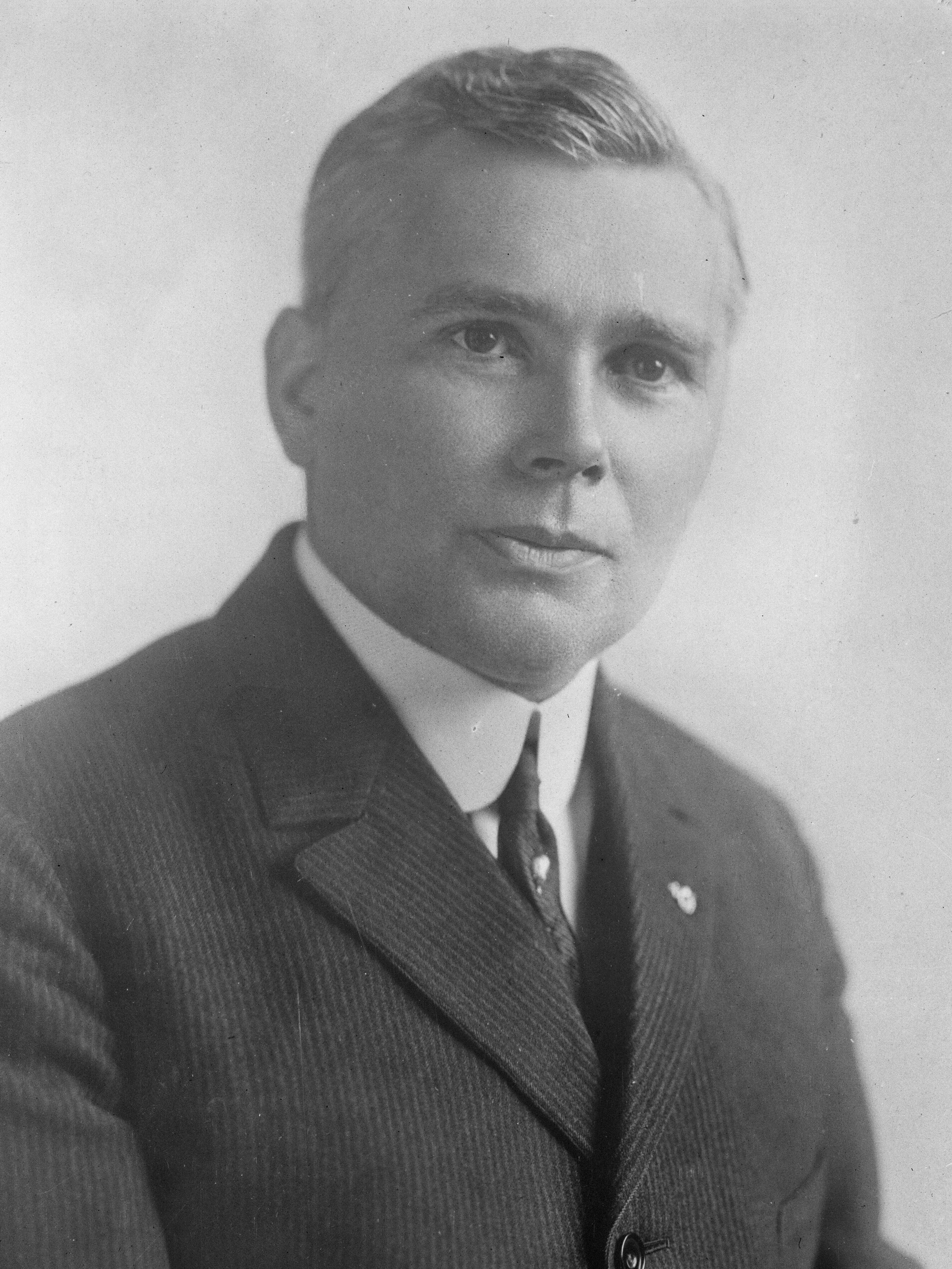
- Boynton c. 1920s

31st President pro tempore of the California State Senate
- In office January 2, 1911 – May 12, 1913
- Preceded by: Edward I. Wolfe
- Succeeded by: Newton W. Thompson

Majority Leader of the California Senate
- In office 1907–1910
- Preceded by: Position established
- Succeeded by: Charles W. Bell

Member of the California Senate from the 6th district
- In office January 7, 1907 – January 4, 1915
- Preceded by: Marshall Diggs
- Succeeded by: William Erskine Duncan Jr.

Personal details
- Born: Albert Eugene Boynton; October 9, 1875 Oroville, California, U.S.
- Died: February 22, 1945 (aged 69) San Francisco, California, U.S.
- Party: Republican
- Spouse: Susie Clark Davis (m. 1901)
- Children: 4
- Education: Oroville Union High School
- Alma mater: University of Michigan
- Occupation: Attorney

Albert Eugene Boynton (October 9, 1875 – February 22, 1945) was an American attorney and politician who served in the California State Senate as a Republican and also served as President pro tempore of the Senate.

== Early life ==
Boyton was born in Oroville, California on October 9, 1875. He attended Oroville Union High School, being a member of its first graduating class before he attended the University of Michigan, studying law, where he was a student of Floyd R. Mechem and also helped annotate one of his books. He worked as an attorney at law, and was elected to the first Board of Trustees of the City of Oroville.

== Political career ==
In 1906 he was elected to the California State Senate's 6th district as a Republican, and would be reelected again in 1910. Between 1907 and 1910, Boynton was the first Majority Leader of the California Senate, and between 1911 and 1913, he was the 31st President pro tempore of the California State Senate. In the State Senate, Boynton was a sponsor of legislation supported by then-governor Hiram Johnson, including the Workmen’s Compensation Act, Public Schools Teacher’s Pension bill, Woman's Suffrage Constitutional Amendment, and the Non-Partisan Judiciary Act. In 1911 he worked with Assemblyman and future Governor of California C. C. Young to author a bill that abolished "party line" ballots and instead introduced uniform secret ballots for all offices. This bill become known as the Boynton-Young bill, and was a landmark of the Progressive Era in California.

Also in 1911, Boynton was the author of Proposition 9, which amended the constitution to state that criminal cases could not be reversed on appeal because of technical procedural error, unless a miscarriage of justice could be proven. In 1914 he was a candidate for the Republican nomination for United States Senate in the 1914 election, but withdrew his candidacy.

Boynton was a Presidential elector in the 1916 election, pledging his votes to Charles Evans Hughes. In 1918 he was the President of the Commonwealth Club of San Francisco, and he was appointed by Governor William D. Stephens "to head a commission to plan for improving the administration of state affairs."

He was also the chairman of the State Republican Committee in 1923, where he supported U.S. Senator Hiram Johnson over Calvin Coolidge for the Republican nomination in the 1924 election.

== Personal life ==
Boynton married Susie Clark Davis in 1901, and had 4 children. Boynton was a Freemason and in 1925 was Grand Master of a Lodge. Boynton died on February 22, 1945, in San Francisco at the age of 69.

Preceded by Edward I. Wolfe	President pro tempore of the California State Senate; 1911 – 1913	Succeeded by Newton W. Thompson
