= 1875 California gubernatorial election =

- September 1, 1875

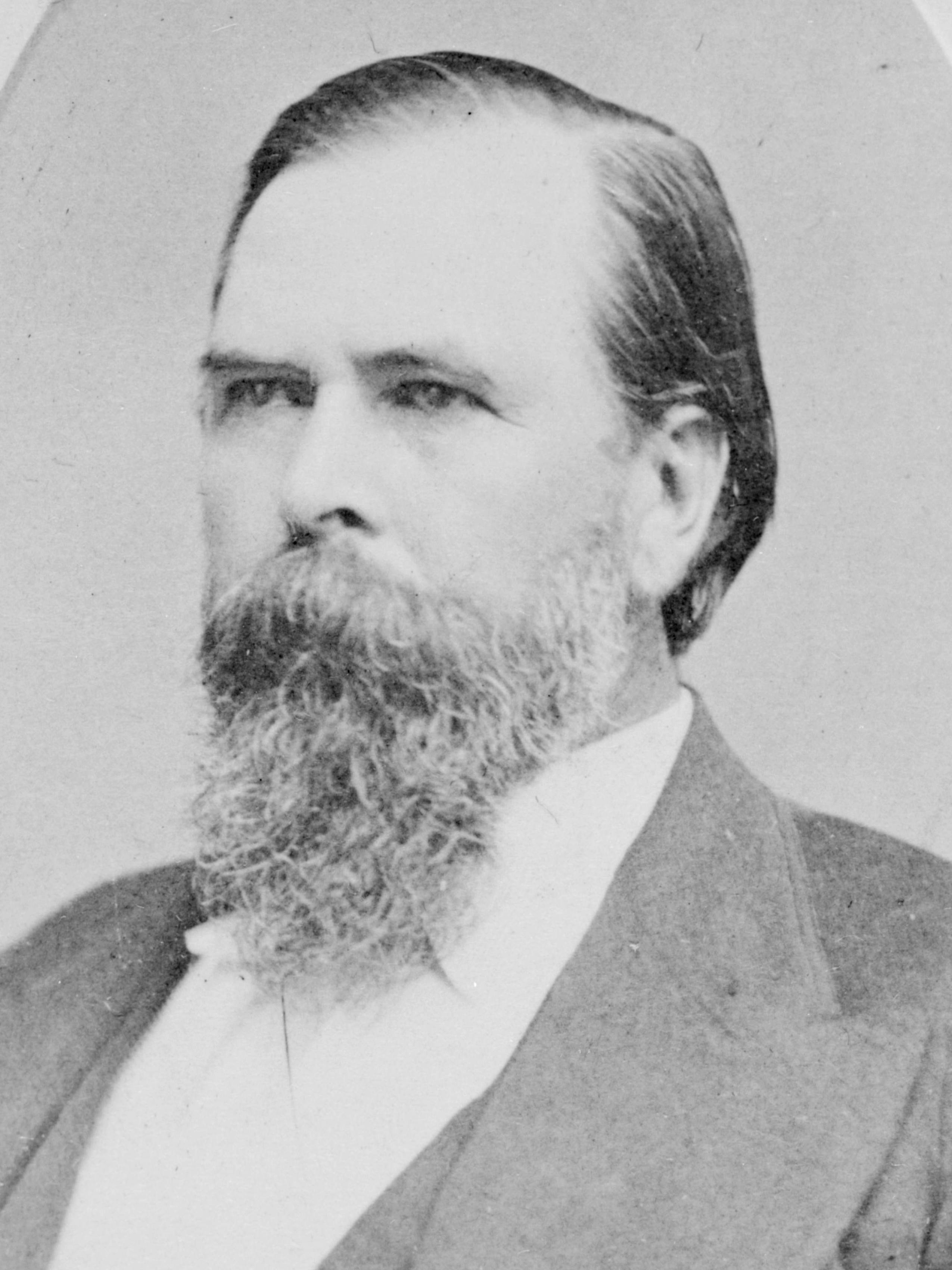
Nominee	William Irwin	Timothy Guy Phelps	John Bidwell
Party	Democratic	Republican	People's Independent
Popular vote	61,509	31,322	29,752
Percentage	50.03%	25.48%	24.20%
County results
Irwin
40–50%
50–60%
60–70%
70–80%
Phelps
40–50%
50–60%
Bidwell
30–40%
50–60%
Governor before election
Romualdo Pacheco
Republican
Elected Governor
William Irwin
Democratic

The 1875 California gubernatorial election was held on September 1, 1875, to elect the governor of California.

== Campaign ==
William Irwin, who became acting lieutenant governor in 1875 when Romualdo Pacheco succeeded to the governorship, secured the Democratic nomination later that year and became the next elected governor of California.

John Bidwell was nominated by the People's Independent Party, which was composed mostly of former Republicans.

== Results ==
California gubernatorial election, 1875
Party	Candidate	Votes	%	±%
Democratic	William Irwin	61,509	50.03%	+2.14%
Republican	Timothy Guy Phelps	31,322	25.48%	−26.64%
People's Independent	John Bidwell	29,752	24.20%	+24.40%
Prohibition	William E. Lovett	356	0.29%	+0.29%
	Scattering	9	0.01%	
Majority		30,187	24.55%	
Total votes		122,948	100.00%	
Democratic gain from Republican		Swing	+28.78%	

=== Results by county ===
County	William Irwin Democratic		Timothy Guy Phelps Republican		John Bidwell People's Independent		William E. Lovett Prohibition		Scattering Write-in		Margin		Total votes cast
County	#	%	#	%	#	%	#	%	#	%	#	%	Total votes cast
Alameda	2,483	46.16%	1,956	36.36%	895	16.64%	45	0.84%	0	0.00%	527	9.80%	5,379
Alpine	80	36.70%	51	23.39%	87	39.91%	0	0.00%	0	0.00%	-7	-3.21%	218
Amador	1,150	52.51%	638	29.19%	393	17.98%	5	0.23%	0	0.00%	512	23.42%	2,186
Butte	1,375	48.43%	318	11.20%	1,146	40.37%	0	0.00%	0	0.00%	229 (Note: Margin over Bidwell)	8.07%	2,839
Calaveras	903	49.43%	522	28.57%	402	22.00%	0	0.00%	0	0.00%	381	20.85%	1,827
Colusa	1,275	67.42%	68	3.60%	548	28.98%	0	0.00%	0	0.00%	727	38.45%	1,891
Contra Costa	699	37.40%	765	40.93%	396	21.19%	9	0.48%	0	0.00%	-66	-3.53%	1,869
Del Norte	236	56.19%	48	11.43%	136	32.38%	0	0.00%	0	0.00%	100	23.81%	420
El Dorado	1,238	48.84%	740	29.19%	556	21.93%	1	0.04%	0	0.00%	498	19.64%	2,535
Fresno	651	72.58%	49	5.46%	197	21.96%	0	0.00%	0	0.00%	454	50.61%	897
Humboldt	714	36.82%	951	49.05%	272	14.03%	2	0.10%	0	0.00%	-237	-12.22%	1,939
Inyo	359	45.39%	179	22.63%	248	31.35%	5	0.63%	0	0.00%	111	14.03%	791
Kern	694	57.40%	138	11.41%	376	31.10%	1	0.08%	0	0.00%	318	26.30%	1,209
Lake	663	68.92%	82	8.52%	211	21.93%	6	0.62%	0	0.00%	452	46.99%	962
Lassen	199	37.34%	134	25.14%	200	37.52%	0	0.00%	0	0.00%	-1	-0.19%	533
Los Angeles	2,898	56.73%	667	13.06%	1,543	30.21%	0	0.00%	0	0.00%	1,355	26.53%	5,108
Marin	471	43.65%	310	28.73%	298	27.62%	0	0.00%	0	0.00%	161	14.92%	1,079
Mariposa	484	50.73%	58	6.08%	412	43.19%	0	0.00%	0	0.00%	72	7.55%	954
Mendocino	1,071	60.99%	204	11.62%	481	27.39%	0	0.00%	0	0.00%	590	33.60%	1,756
Merced	585	50.69%	172	14.90%	397	34.40%	0	0.00%	0	0.00%	188	16.29%	1,154
Modoc	336	53.59%	7	1.12%	284	45.30%	0	0.00%	0	0.00%	52	8.29%	627
Mono	80	31.87%	37	14.74%	133	52.99%	1	0.40%	0	0.00%	-53	-21.12%	251
Monterey	886	42.95%	736	35.68%	441	21.38%	0	0.00%	0	0.00%	150	7.27%	2,063
Napa	989	53.00%	629	33.71%	248	13.29%	0	0.00%	0	0.00%	360	19.29%	1,866
Nevada	1,664	44.70%	1,067	28.66%	990	26.59%	2	0.05%	0	0.00%	597	16.04%	3,723
Placer	881	34.43%	1,065	41.62%	606	23.68%	7	0.27%	0	0.00%	-184	-7.19%	2,559
Plumas	550	45.64%	230	19.09%	425	35.27%	0	0.00%	0	0.00%	125	10.37%	1,205
Sacramento	2,361	42.98%	1,483	27.00%	1,649	30.02%	0	0.00%	0	0.00%	712	12.96%	5,493
San Benito	643	54.68%	285	24.23%	199	16.92%	49	4.17%	0	0.00%	358	30.44%	1,176
San Bernardino	729	53.56%	204	14.99%	427	31.37%	1	0.07%	0	0.00%	302	22.19%	1,361
San Diego	755	47.16%	593	37.04%	252	15.74%	1	0.26%	0	0.00%	162	10.12%	1,601
San Francisco	14,199	55.61%	5,179	20.28%	6,080	23.81%	71	0.28%	5	0.02%	8,119	31.80%	25,534
San Joaquin	1,440	38.97%	1,805	48.85%	449	12.15%	1	0.03%	0	0.00%	-365	-9.88%	3,695
San Luis Obispo	756	48.21%	199	12.69%	596	38.01%	17	1.08%	0	0.00%	160	10.20%	1,568
San Mateo	623	38.86%	828	51.65%	141	8.80%	11	0.69%	0	0.00%	-205	-12.79%	1,603
Santa Barbara	798	45.57%	409	23.36%	541	30.90%	3	0.17%	0	0.00%	257	14.68%	1,751
Santa Clara	2,634	51.81%	1,695	33.34%	733	14.42%	22	0.43%	0	0.00%	939	18.47%	5,084
Santa Cruz	834	40.35%	645	31.20%	578	27.96%	8	0.39%	2	0.10%	189	9.14%	2,067
Shasta	614	51.08%	288	23.96%	296	24.63%	4	0.33%	0	0.00%	318	26.46%	1,202
Sierra	470	34.89%	348	25.84%	519	38.53%	10	0.74%	0	0.00%	-49	-3.64%	1,347
Siskiyou	886	57.91%	490	32.03%	154	10.07%	0	0.00%	0	0.00%	396	25.88%	1,530
Solano	1,480	43.44%	1,391	40.83%	532	15.61%	4	0.12%	0	0.00%	89	2.61%	3,407
Sonoma	2,106	58.23%	736	20.35%	737	20.38%	38	1.05%	0	0.00%	1,369	37.85%	3,617
Stanislaus	788	60.29%	382	29.23%	137	10.48%	0	0.00%	0	0.00%	406	31.06%	1,307
Sutter	555	45.16%	184	14.97%	490	39.87%	0	0.00%	0	0.00%	65	5.29%	1,229
Tehama	599	52.54%	404	35.44%	136	11.93%	1	0.09%	0	0.00%	195	17.11%	1,140
Trinity	400	48.84%	334	40.78%	75	9.16%	10	1.22%	0	0.00%	66	8.06%	819
Tulare	846	54.06%	285	18.21%	434	27.73%	0	0.00%	0	0.00%	412	26.33%	1,565
Tuolumne	931	53.08%	501	28.56%	322	18.36%	0	0.00%	0	0.00%	430	24.52%	1,754
Ventura	414	42.86%	120	12.42%	413	42.75%	17	1.76%	2	0.21%	1	0.10%	966
Yolo	1,169	53.28%	136	6.20%	889	40.52%	0	0.00%	0	0.00%	280	12.76%	2,194
Yuba	865	41.23%	577	27.50%	652	31.08%	4	0.19%	0	0.00%	213	10.15%	2,098
Total	61,509	50.03%	31,322	25.48%	29,752	24.20%	356	0.29%	9	0.01%	30,187	24.55%	122,948

==== Counties that flipped from Republican to Democratic ====
- Alameda
- Amador
- Marin
- Napa
- Nevada
- Plumas
- Sacramento
- San Francisco
- Santa Barbara
- Santa Clara
- Santa Cruz
- Solano
- Trinity
- Yuba

==== Counties that flipped from Republican to People's Independent ====
- Alpine
- Lassen
- Mono
- Sierra
