= Court of Sessions (California) =

The Court of Sessions system was introduced in each county of California shortly after the attainment of statehood in 1850; the court was dissolved in 1863.

The Court of Sessions was largely a provisional device for governing California counties prior to the first election of boards of supervisors. Thus its powers extended beyond the purely judicial, and included executive and legislative functions.

It was presided over by an elected County Judge and two appointed associated judges. The Court of Sessions in each county was disbanded upon the election of a Board of Supervisors.

== See also ==
- Court of Sessions for other courts having the same or similar name.
