= Floyd R. Mechem House =

- U.S. National Register of Historic Places
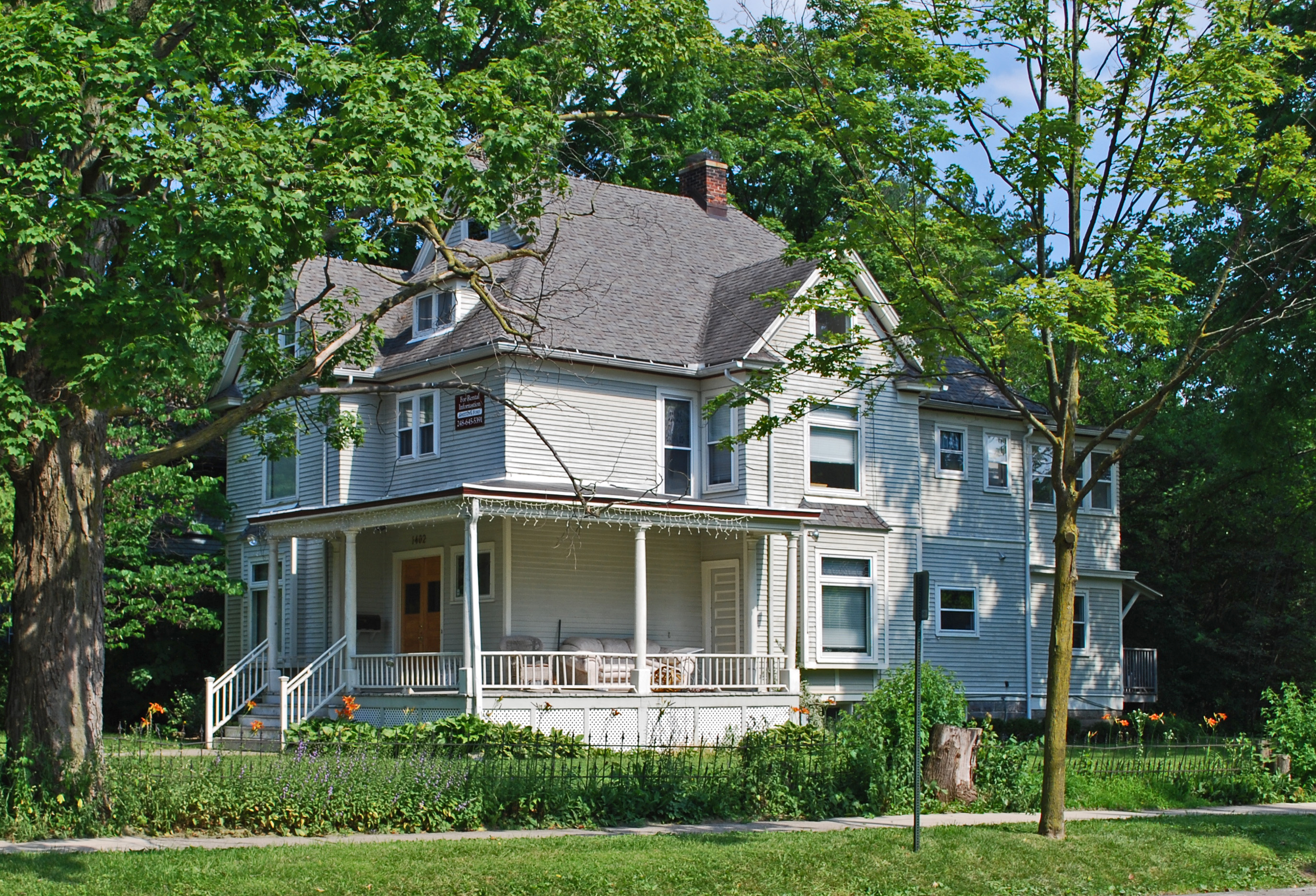
- Interactive map
- Location: 1402 Hill St., Ann Arbor, Michigan
- Coordinates: 42°16′19″N 83°43′53″W
- Area: less than one acre
- Built: 1898
- Architectural style: Queen Anne
- NRHP reference No.: 99001456
- Added to NRHP: December 9, 1999

The Floyd R. Mechem House is a single-family home located at 1402 Hill Street in Ann Arbor, Michigan. It was listed on the National Register of Historic Places in 1999.

== History ==
Floyd R. Mechem was born in New York in 1858, and moved to Ann Arbor at a young age. He attended high school in 1874–75, after which he taught himself law. He was admitted to the bar in 1879. He set up a practice in Battle Creek, Michigan, serving as city attorney. In 1887 he moved to Detroit and established the firm of Mechem & Beaumont. In 1892, he was appointed Tappan Professor of Law in the Law Department at the University of Michigan. In 1898, Mechem had this house constructed for him. He lived in it until 1903, when he was appointed professor of law at the University of Chicago Law School. Mecham died in 1928.

From 1917 to 1923, this house was the home of Professor Joseph A. Bursley, who was appointed to the mechanical engineering faculty in 1904, and was the university's first dean of students beginning in 1921. In the mid-1930s, the house was used as a Women's League residence. It was later used as general housing for students.

== Description ==
The Mechem House is a two-and-one-half-story wood-frame building with a steeply pitched hip- and cross-gable-roof and Colonial Revival trim. A two-story addition is located in the rear. The exterior walls are covered with clapboard, and it stands on a fieldstone foundation. A wooden beltcourse with molded cap runs between the first and second stories; cornerboards trim the first story below. The roof has five gables and a front-facing hipped dormer. A wraparound porch with Tuscan columns and spindlework extends across half the facade. The front entryway contains double doors with beveled glass lights. Six large windows with leaded glass transoms are in the front and side facades, and an Art Glass window next to the front entrance illuminates the main staircase. The remaining windows are double-hung units with single-light sash.

On the interior, the entrance hall, parlor, sitting room, and dining room on the first floor are all extensively decorated with birdseye maple. The flooring is of oak and maple.
