= Edward J. Lewis (California politician) =

American politician

17th and 21st President pro tempore of the California State Senate
- In office December 3, 1877 – April 16, 1880
- Preceded by: Benjamin F. Tuttle
- Succeeded by: George F. Baker
- In office December 6, 1869 – April 1, 1872
- Preceded by: Lansing B. Mizner
- Succeeded by: James T. Farley

Member of the California State Senate
- In office 1875–1880
- Constituency: 29th district
- In office 1867–1872
- Constituency: 25th district

Member of the California State Assembly from the 13th district
- In office 1855–1867

Personal details
- Born: Edward Jefferson Lewis; May 6, 1832 Middletown, Connecticut, U.S.
- Died: April 20, 1881 (age 49) Red Bluff, California, U.S.
- Party: Democratic
- Spouse: Anita C. Chard
- Children: 8

Edward Jefferson Lewis (1832 – April 20, 1881) was an American politician and member of the Democratic Party who served in the California State Assembly and California State Senate, serving as the Senate's 17th President pro tempore. He was the Democratic nominee for Lieutenant Governor of California in the 1871 election.

== Biography ==
Lewis was born in Middletown, Connecticut in 1832. He settled in Tehama County, California and in 1855 was elected to the California State Assembly, representing the 13th district. At the age of 23, he was likely the Assembly's youngest member. In 1867, he was elected to the state Senate from the 25th district, and between 1869 and 1872, was President pro tempore of the Senate. He was also a presidential elector in 1864.

In the 1871 election, Lewis was the Democratic nominee for Lieutenant Governor of California. He lost to Republican candidate and future governor of California Romualdo Pacheco.

In 1875, he returned to the state Senate, representing the 25th district. He served a second term as President pro tem of the Senate from 1879 to 1880. Lewis died in Red Bluff, California on April 20, 1881.

== Personal life ==
Lewis was married to Anita C. Chard, with whom he had eight children.

Preceded by Lansing B. Mizner	President pro tempore of the California State Senate; 1869-1872	Succeeded by James T. Farley
Preceded by Benjamin F. Tuttle	President pro tempore of the California State Senate; 1877-1880	Succeeded by George F. Baker
