= Bloomfield Academy (Skowhegan, Maine) =

- U.S. National Register of Historic Places
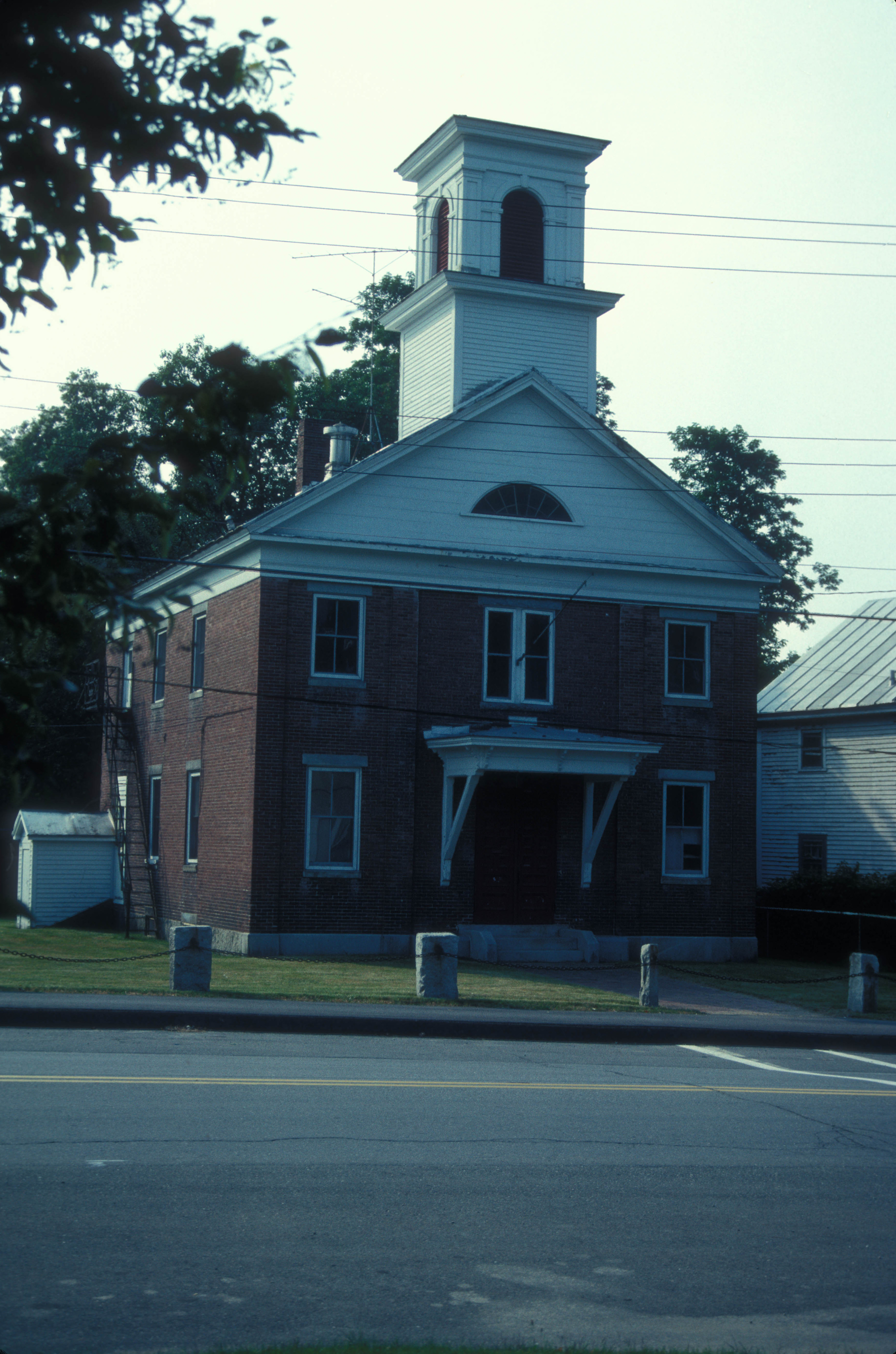
- 1970 photo

- Location within Maine Location within the United States
- Location: Main St., Skowhegan, Maine
- Coordinates: 44°45′37″N 69°43′4″W
- Area: 0.5 acres (0.20 ha)
- Built: 1840
- Built by: Dyer, Asa
- Architectural style: Greek Revival
- NRHP reference No.: 82000778
- Added to NRHP: February 19, 1982

The Bloomfield Academy is a historic former school building at 33 Main Street in Skowhegan, Maine. (It is adjacent to the former First Baptist Church, which is also on the National Register of Historic Places). Built in 1840 by a local master builder, it is a fine Greek Revival structure, and a reminder of the area's early educational history. It was listed on the National Register of Historic Places in 1982.

== Description and history ==
The Bloomfield Academy is a two-story brick structure with a gable roof, granite trim, and a granite foundation. It is topped by a two-stage tower, whose first stage is a plain clapboarded square with a simple cornice, and whose second stage has arched louvered openings flanked by pilasters, with an entablature and cornice above. The main (east-facing) facade is three bays wide, with brick piers dividing them. There is a double-door entry in the center, sheltered by an extended hip-roofed hood. The flanking bays have sash windows at both levels, while the second level above the entry as a double sash window. The gable end above is clad in clapboards, and has a semi-oval window in its center.

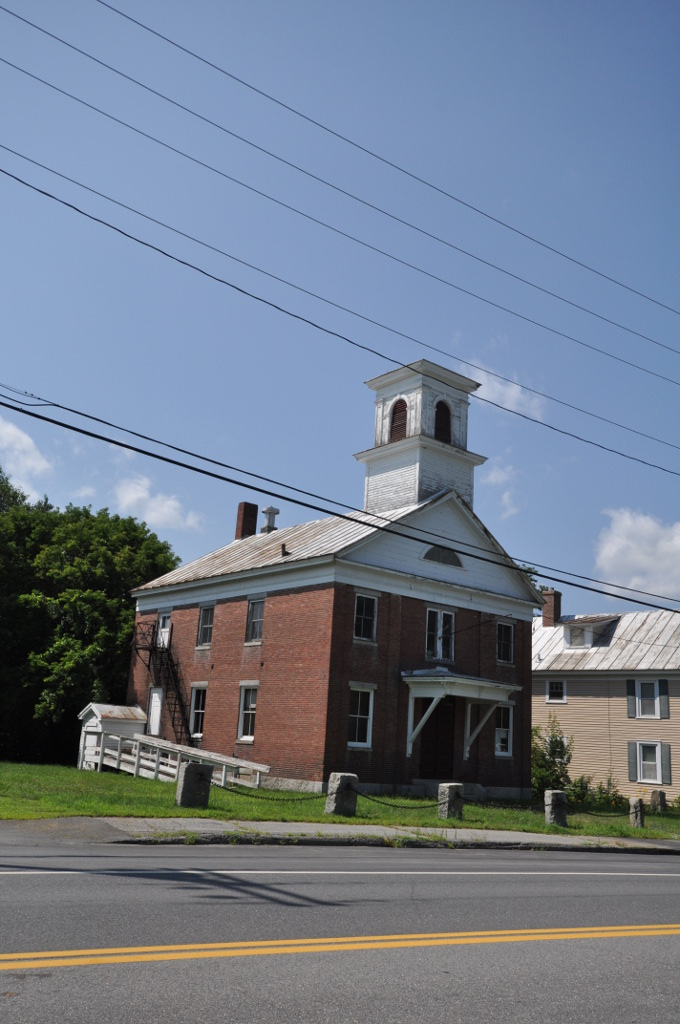
The building in 2018

The school that became Bloomfield Academy was chartered in 1807 as Canaan Academy, a private school. It was renamed in 1819 when the town it was in was renamed, but it retained that name when Bloomfield was annexed to Skowhegan in 1861. The school's first building was a wood-frame structure, which this building replaced in 1840. The builder was Asa Dyer, a noted local brickmaker and master builder. The school was eventually merged into the Skowhegan public schools, and its building is now owned by the Trustees of Bloomfield Academy.

== See also ==
- National Register of Historic Places listings in Somerset County, Maine
