= Fred Hartsook =

American photographer

John Frederick Hartsook
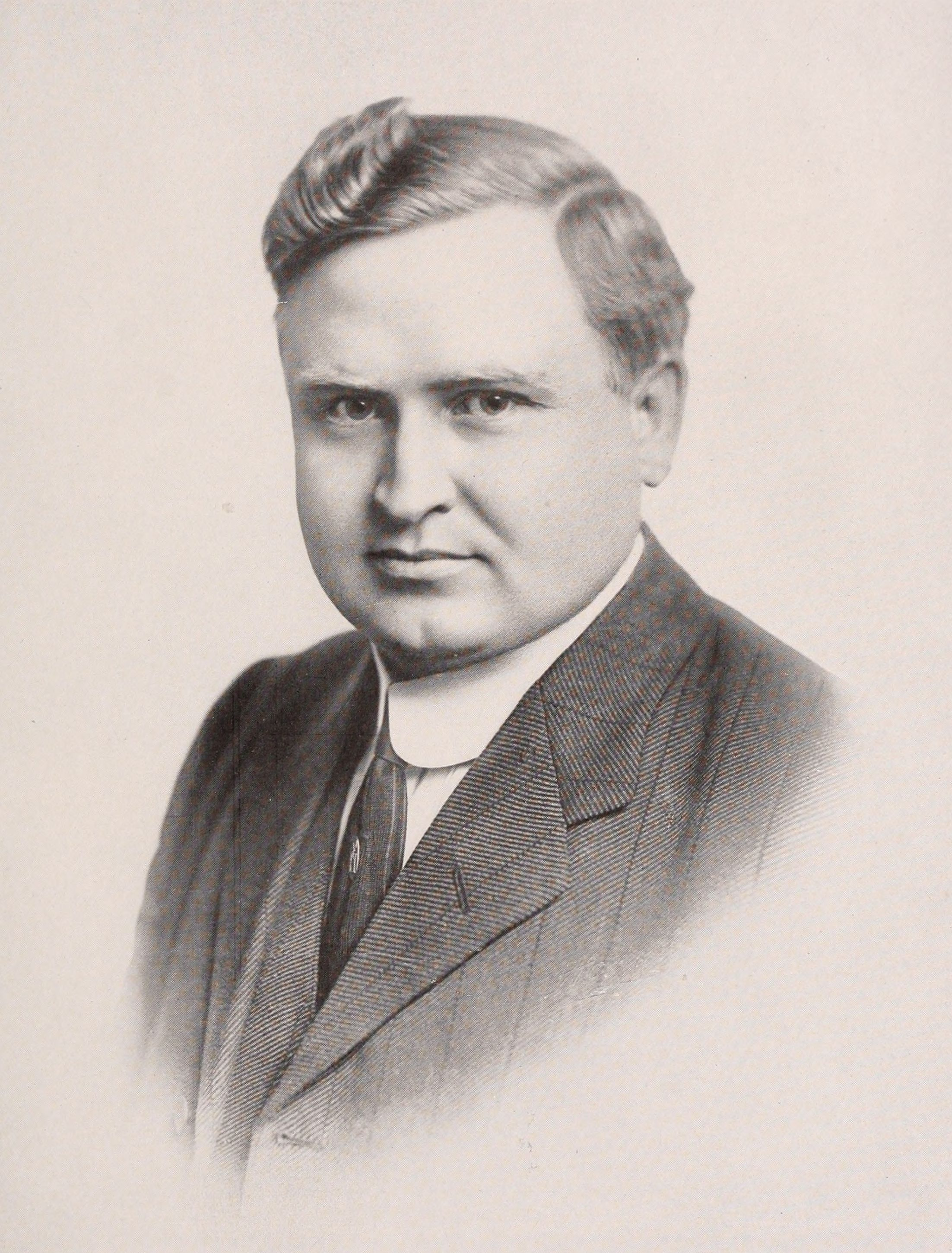
- Born: 26 October 1876; Marion, Indiana
- Died: 30 September 1930 (aged 53); Burbank, California
- Other name: Fred
- Occupations: Photographer, rancher

Fred Hartsook (26 October 1876 – 30 September 1930) was an American photographer and owner of a California studio chain described as "the largest photographic business in the world" at the time, who counted Henry Ford, Charles Lindbergh, Mary Pickford, and sitting President Woodrow Wilson among his celebrity clients. He later became the owner of the Hartsook Inn, a resort in Humboldt County, and two ranches in Southern California on which he reared prized Holstein cattle. Hartsook was married to Bess Hesby, queen of the San Francisco Pan-Pacific Exposition of 1915.

== Early life and career as photographer ==
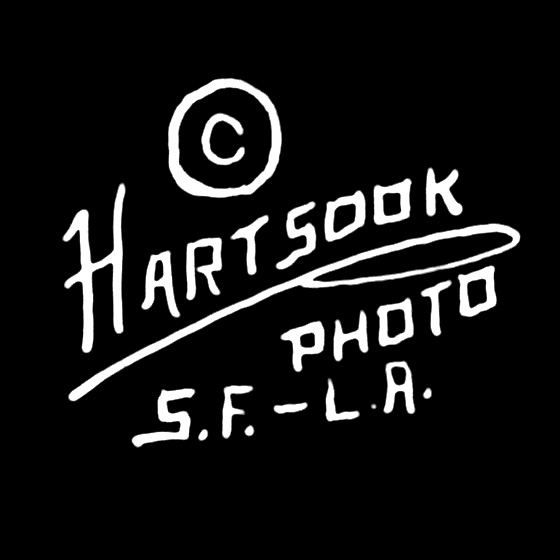
Copyright mark of Hartsook Photo, S.F.–L.A., 1918

Fred Hartsook was born on 26 October 1876 in Marion, Indiana to John Hartsook and Abbie, née Gorham. He was born into a family of photographers and studio owners, his father and two uncles were all successful in the business and his grandfather had been the first photographer to open a studio in Virginia. According to a 1921 profile by John S. McGroarty, "the first Hartsooks [took] up the profession when it was in the infancy of development with the old daguerreotype and the first wet plate processes."

After graduating from high school at age sixteen Hartsook was apprenticed by his uncle as a civil engineer, but spent most of his time in his father's studio. He moved to Salt Lake City, Utah and married Flora "Flossie" Newcomb on 12 September 1901. Flossie came from a family of photographers. She operated her own studio in Vernal, Utah in 1906. Flossie served as Fred's assistant for their traveling photographic studio throughout the Utah territory. They had one daughter; Frances born 25 June 1902. Fred and family then set out to establish themselves in California, arriving sometime after 1906. The coupled divorced sometime before 1919.

Initially, Hartsook operated as an "itinerant shutterbug, [wandering] all over the state, his team of mules pulling a homemade darkroom." Later he opened two studios, in Santa Ana and Santa Barbara, but eventually closed them in order to open a studio on 636 South Broadway in Los Angeles.

Hartsook's success as a photographer and studio owner allowed him to expand into other cities along the Pacific Coast, including San Francisco and Oakland. In 1921, McGroarty gives the number of studios as 20 and describes it as the "largest photographic business in the world". Bill Robertson, director of the Los Angeles Bureau of Street Services, cited by KPCC in 2009, mentions 30 studios.

Even if the bulk of the business came from everyday studio portraiture, Hartsook gained prominence through his celebrity clients, which included silent era Hollywood actors such as Mary Pickford, Lillian Gish, and Carlyle Blackwell, other celebrities such as pilot Charles Lindbergh, entrepreneur Henry Ford, and opera singer Geraldine Farrar, and politicians like House leaders Champ Clark and Joseph Gurney Cannon. McGroarty describes a 40-minute sitting with President Woodrow Wilson in September 1919 as "the first formal sitting since Mr. Wilson became president."

In 1919, Fred Hartsook married Bess Hesby, who in 1915 was "Miss Liberty" at the Panama-Pacific International Exposition in San Francisco. They honeymooned in a cabin six miles (10 km) south of Garberville in the redwood forest of Humboldt County, California.

== Later life as rancher and resort owner ==
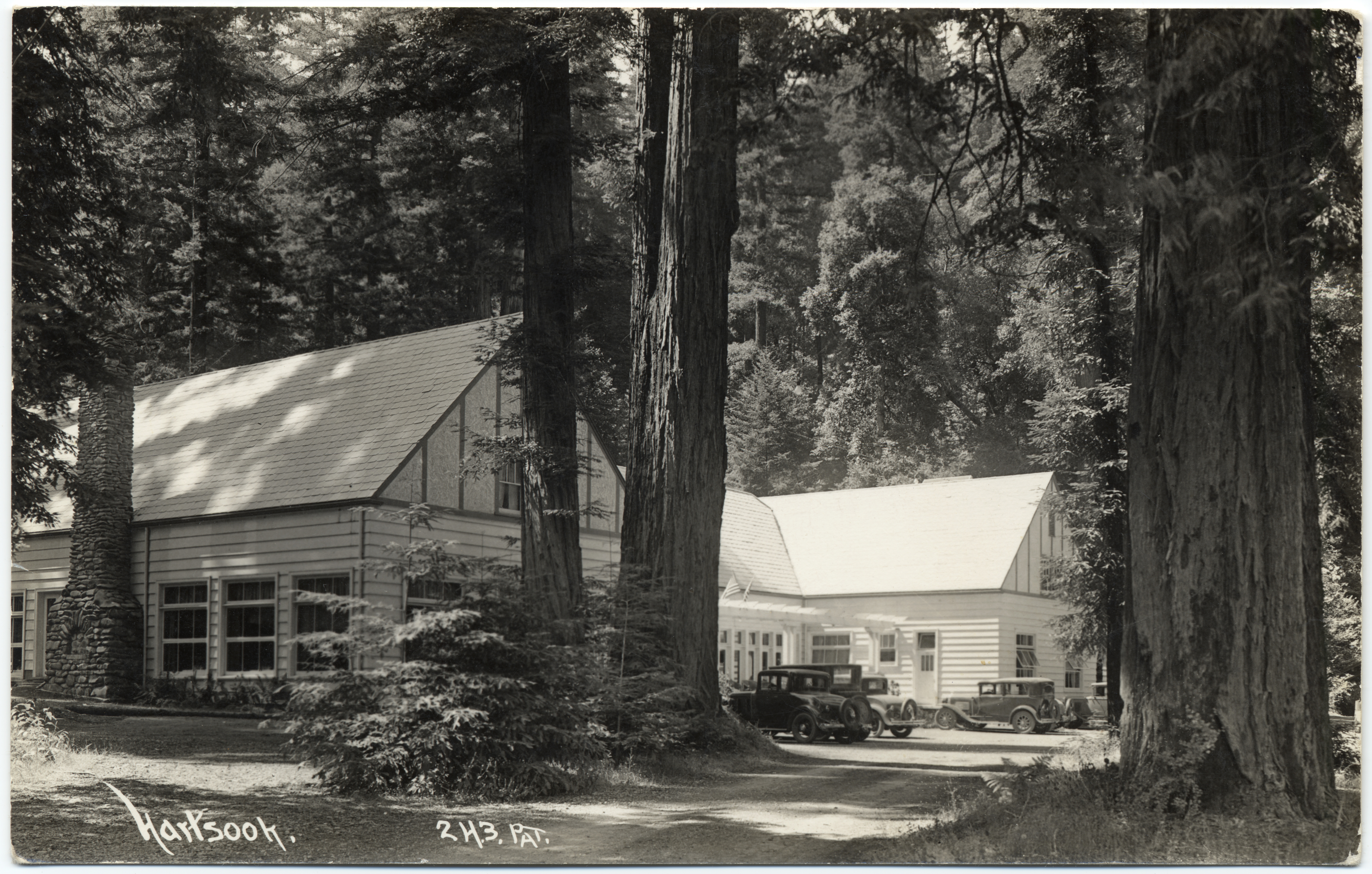
Hartsook Inn

The success of his photographic business allowed Hartsook to acquire three properties in California and take up life as a rancher and resort owner. In addition to 3,000 acres (12.1 km^{2}) of pastureland at the mouth of Red Rock Canyon in Kern County, Hartsook also owned a 41-acre (0.16 km^{2}) "country home and ranch" in Lankershim (now North Hollywood), where he raised prize-winning purebred Holstein cattle as well as Toggenburg milk goats and "big type Poland China hogs". Hartsook's herd of pure-bred Holstein cattle in Lankershim contracted foot and mouth disease in May 1924. His herd of 366 animals, valued at US$426,000, were all shot and killed.

McGroarty notes that Hartsook's training as a civil engineer helped him develop his properties. Also in keeping with his past as mule driver, "it [was] not uncommon for Mr. Hartsook to pose some of the world's noted people one day and be driving a big mule team on his ranch the next."

In the early 1920s the Hartsooks also purchased their honeymoon cabin and extended it to a resort comprising 37 acres (0.15 km^{2}) of pristine redwood forests, the Hartsook Inn. In 1926 the resort received its own post office and Hartsook, California became an official postal designation. At that time the resort was a major attraction for Hollywood celebrities and counted Mary Pickford and Bing Crosby among its guests. In August 1927 the Hartsook Inn burned down in a forest fire, but was rebuilt and reopened shortly thereafter. In Spring 1928, Hartsook's photographic business went into receivership and was sold in an auction in January 1929.

On 30 September 1930, Hartsook died of a heart attack in Burbank, California, shortly before his 54th birthday. Bess Hartsook outlived her husband by 46 years and operated the Hartsook Inn until 1938, when it first went into receivership and then burned down again, this time due to a kitchen fire.

Fred and Bess Hartsook had three children: Helen, Frederick, and Delyte. Fred Hartsook also had a daughter, Francis, from his marriage with Flossie Newcomb.

== Legacy ==
Beyond the short-lived postal designation, the Hartsook name is memorialized in a street in the San Fernando Valley, running along the former Lankershim property. In close proximity is Hesby Street, named after Bess Hesby Hartsook. In Humboldt County, Hartsook Creek, a tributary of the South Fork Eel River, and a redwood tree called "the Hartsook Giant" remind visitors of the family name. The Hartsook Inn was rebuilt and survived under a succession of owners (and another fire in 1973) until the 1990s, when the last operator sold the property to the Save the Redwoods League after threatening to log the Giant to stave off bankruptcy.

== Gallery ==
Photographs copyrighted by Hartsook Photo, S.F.–L.A. (San Francisco & Los Angeles).

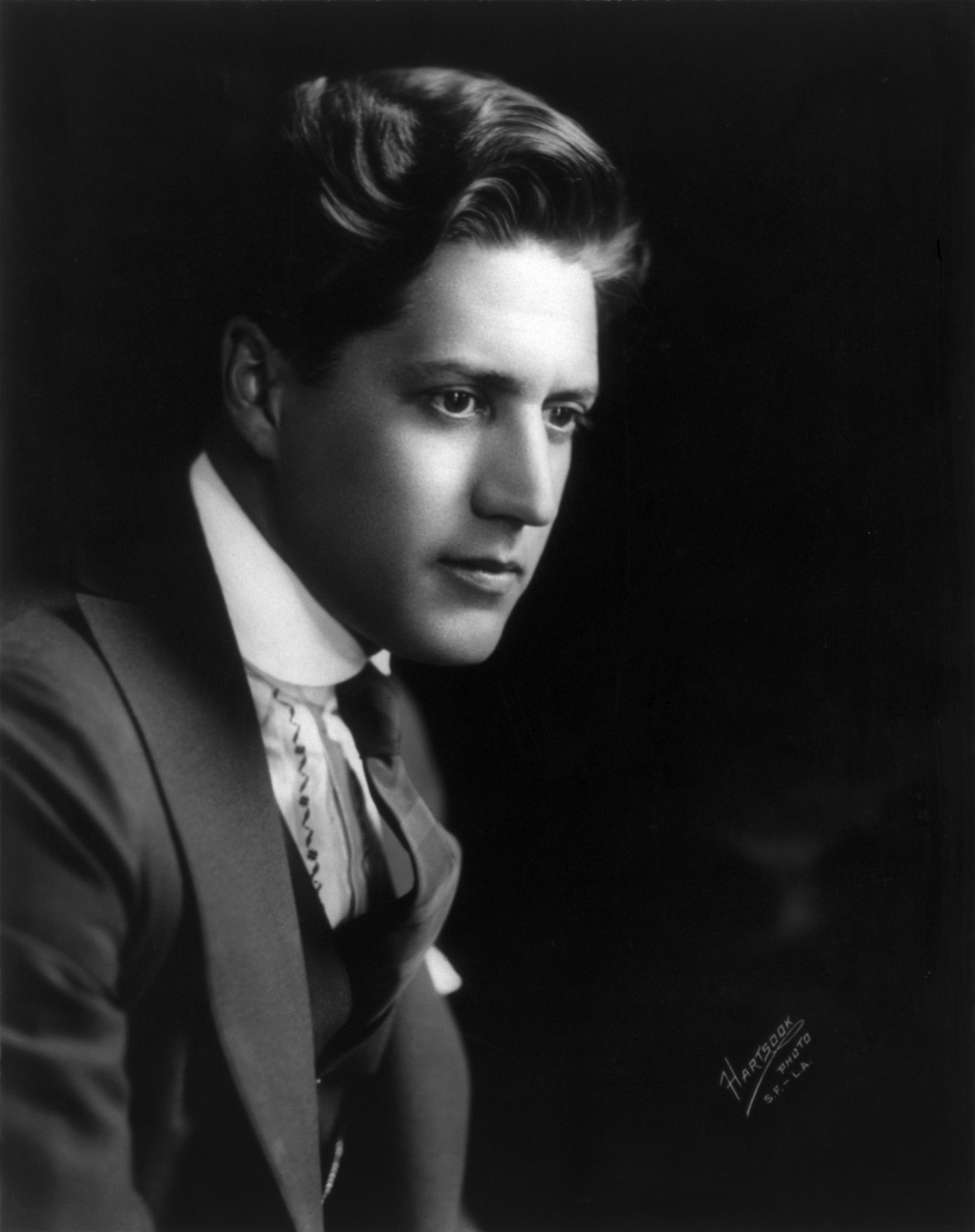
Carlyle Blackwell, 1915

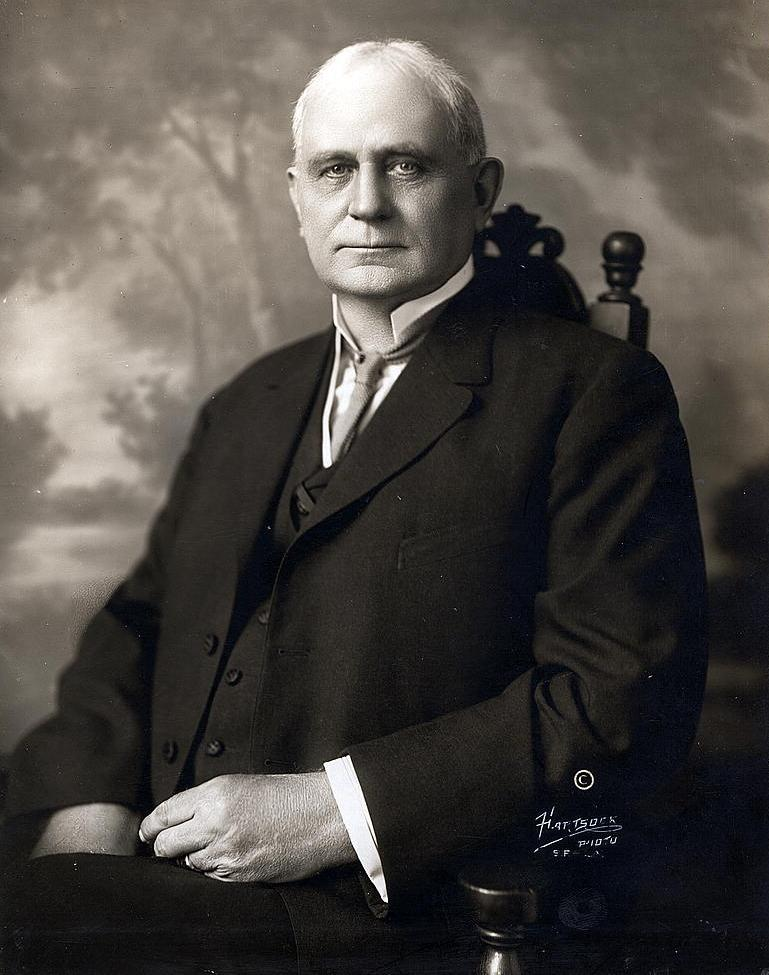
Champ Clark, 1915

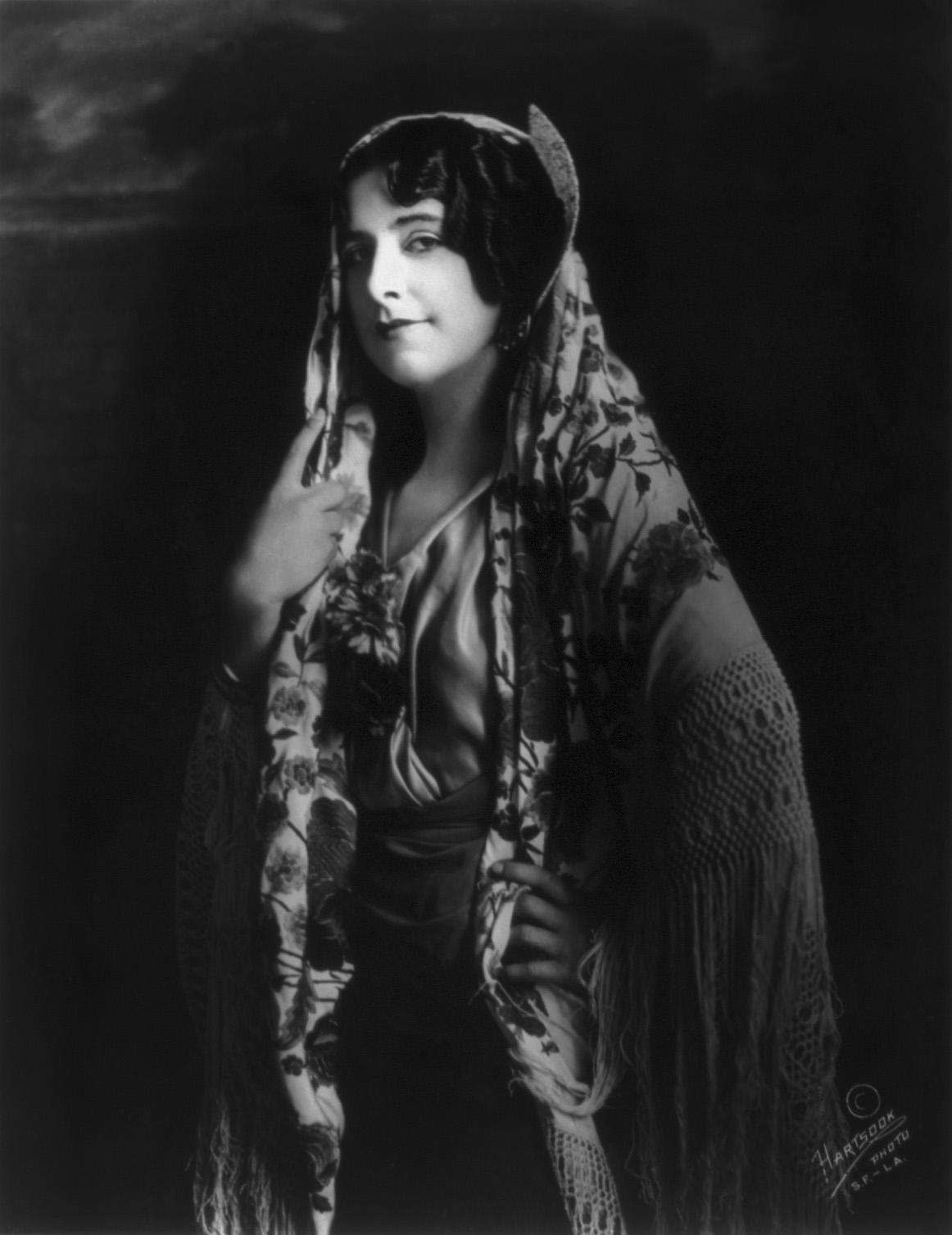
Geraldine Farrar, 1915

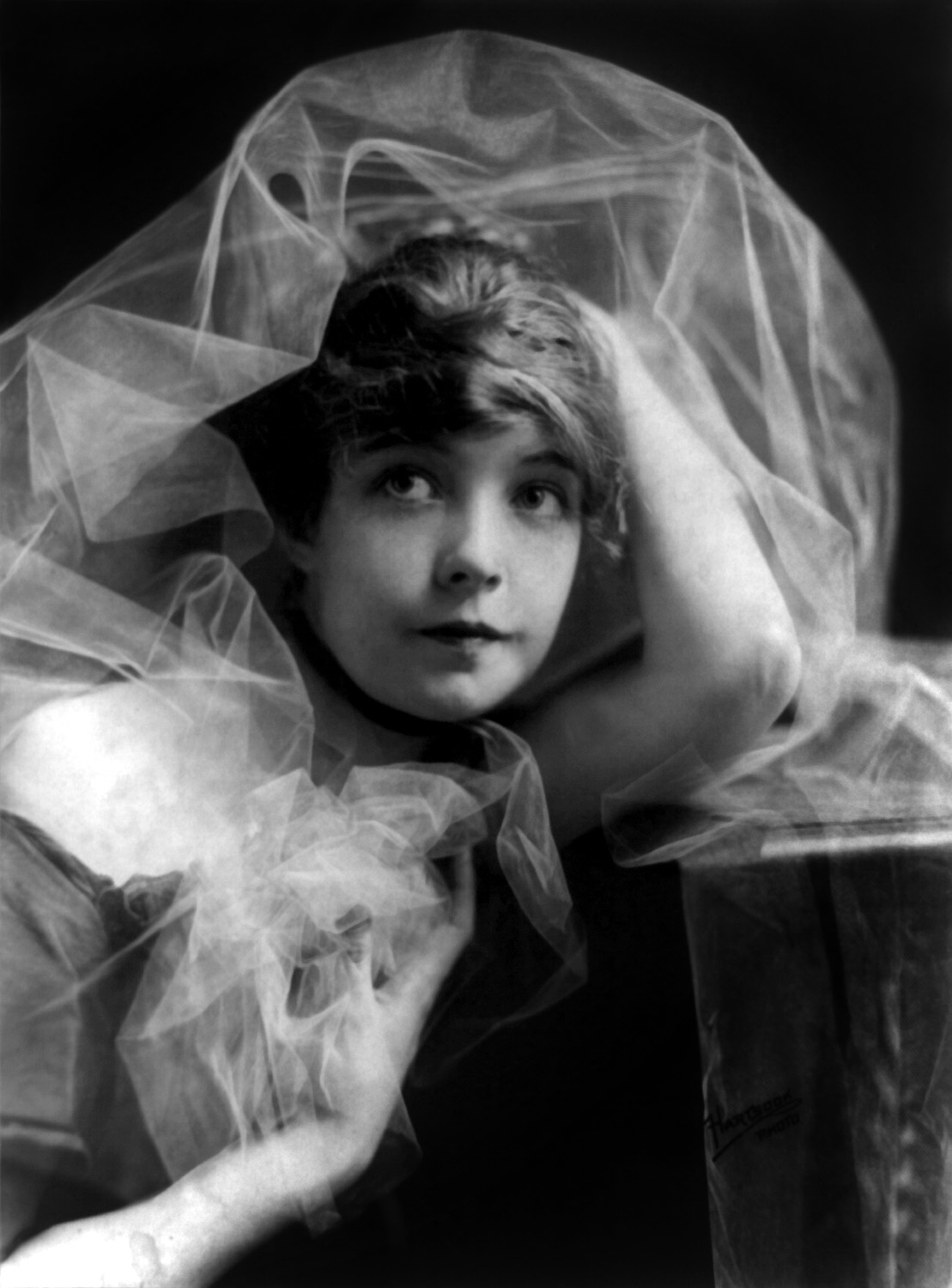
Lillian Gish, 1915

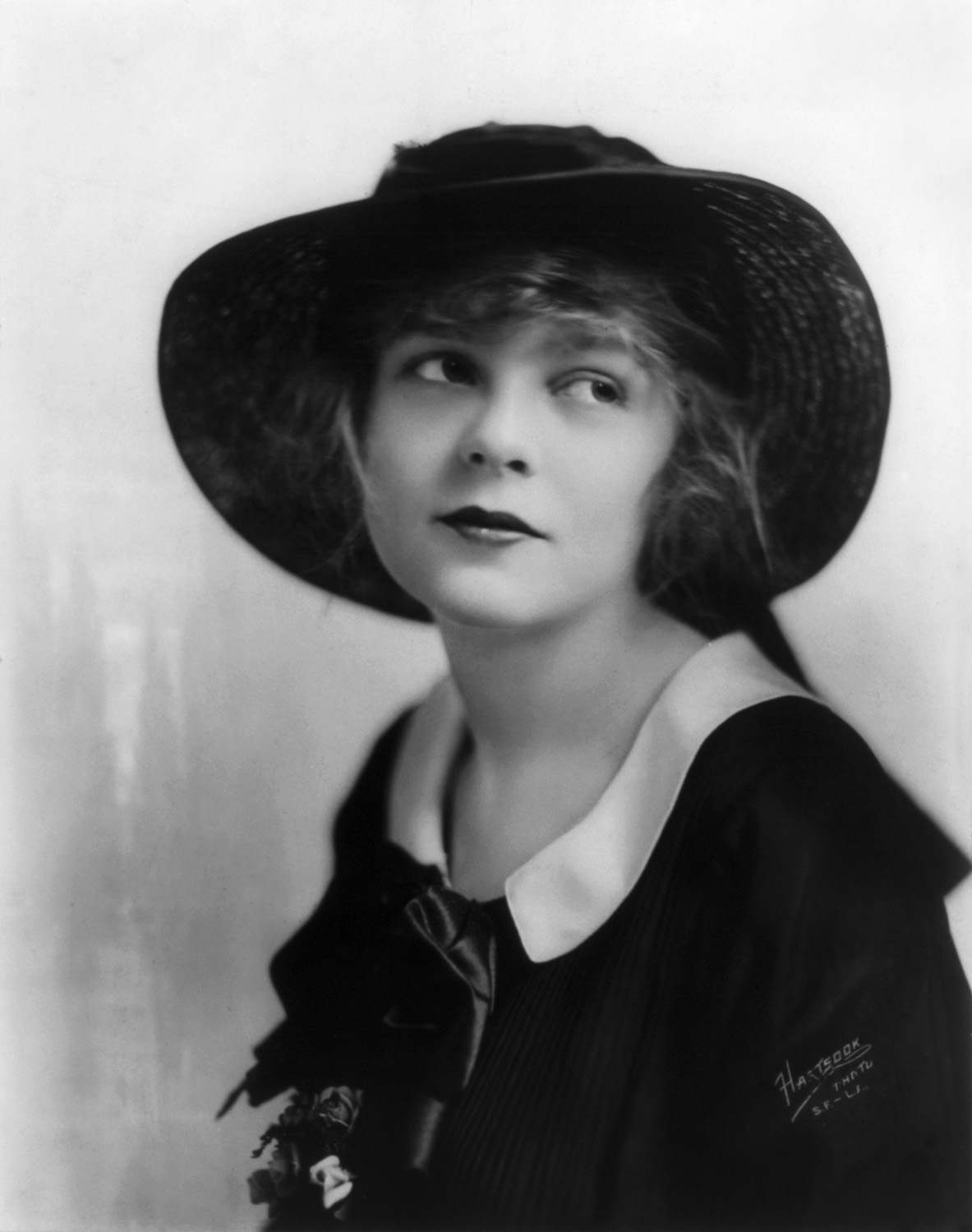
Blanche Sweet, 1915

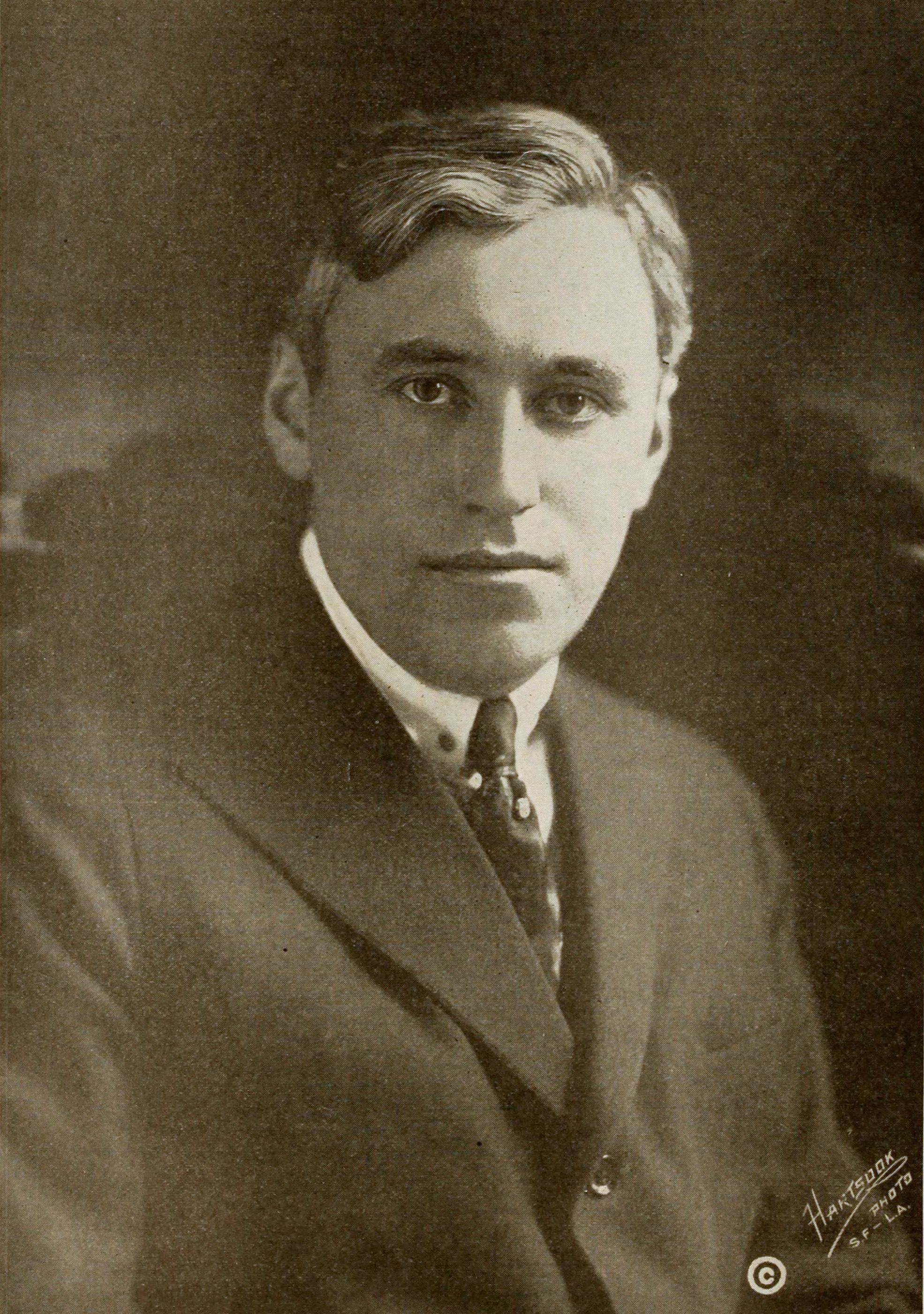
Mack Sennett, 1916

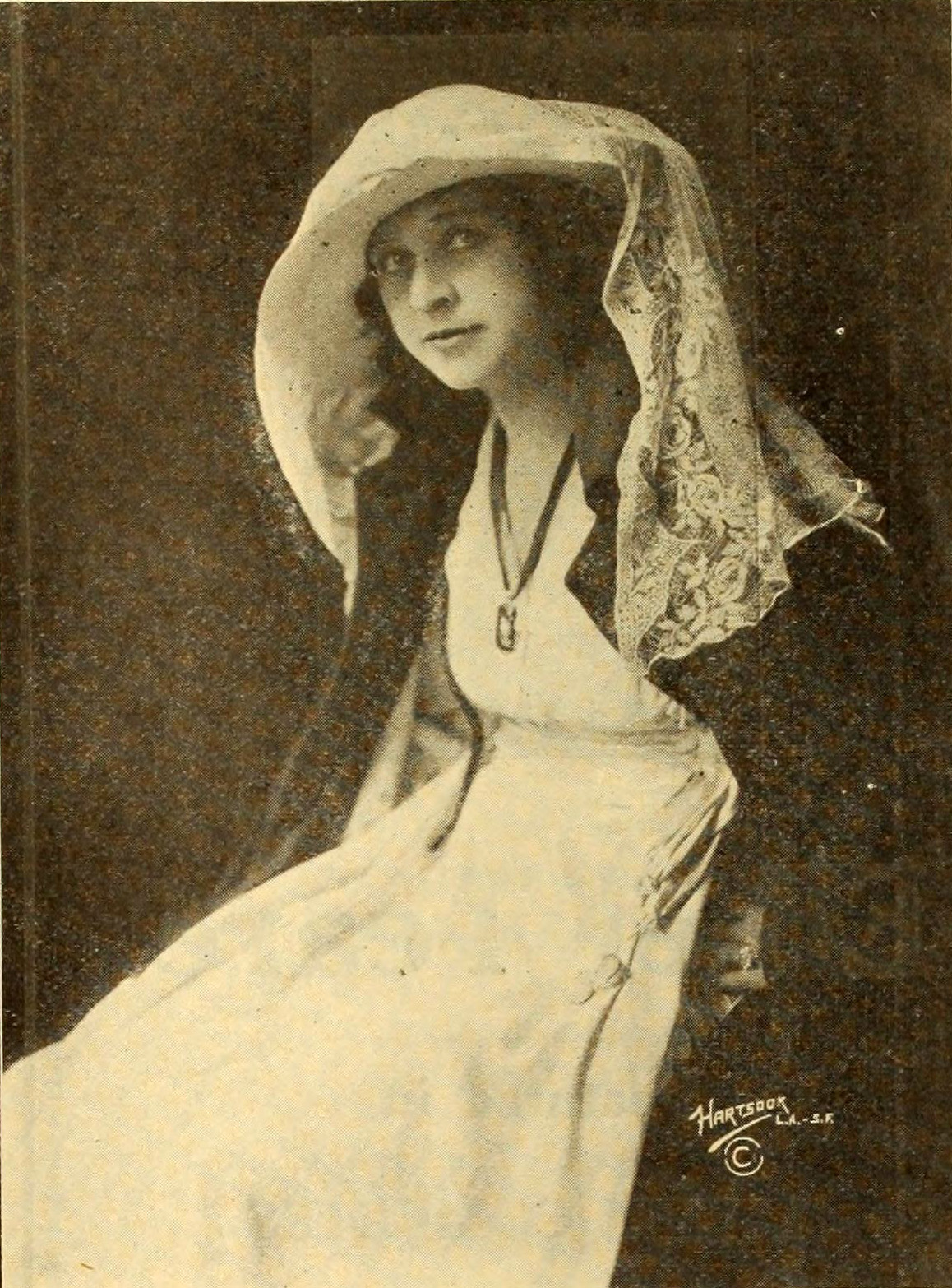
Charlotte Burton, 1916

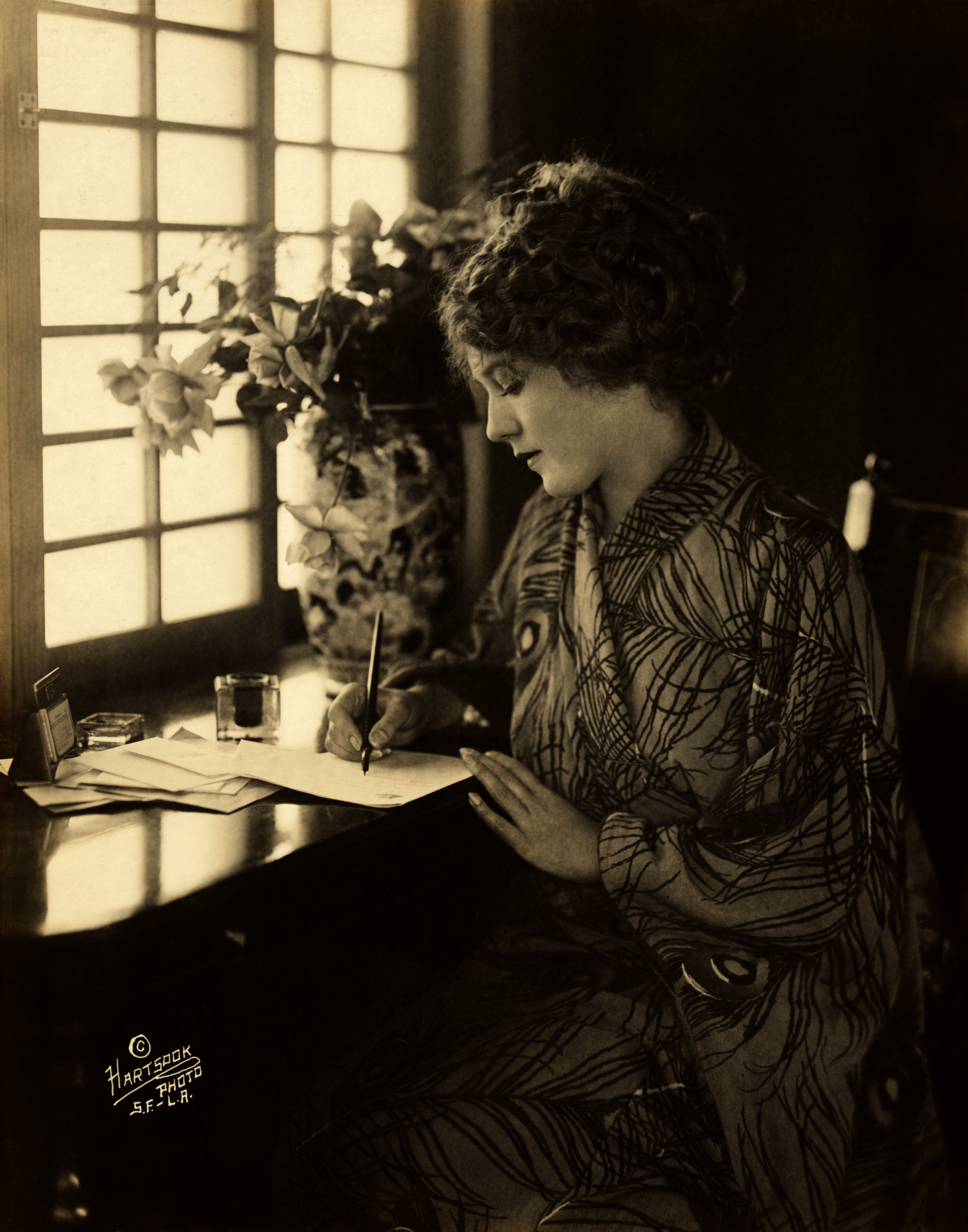
Mary Pickford, 1918

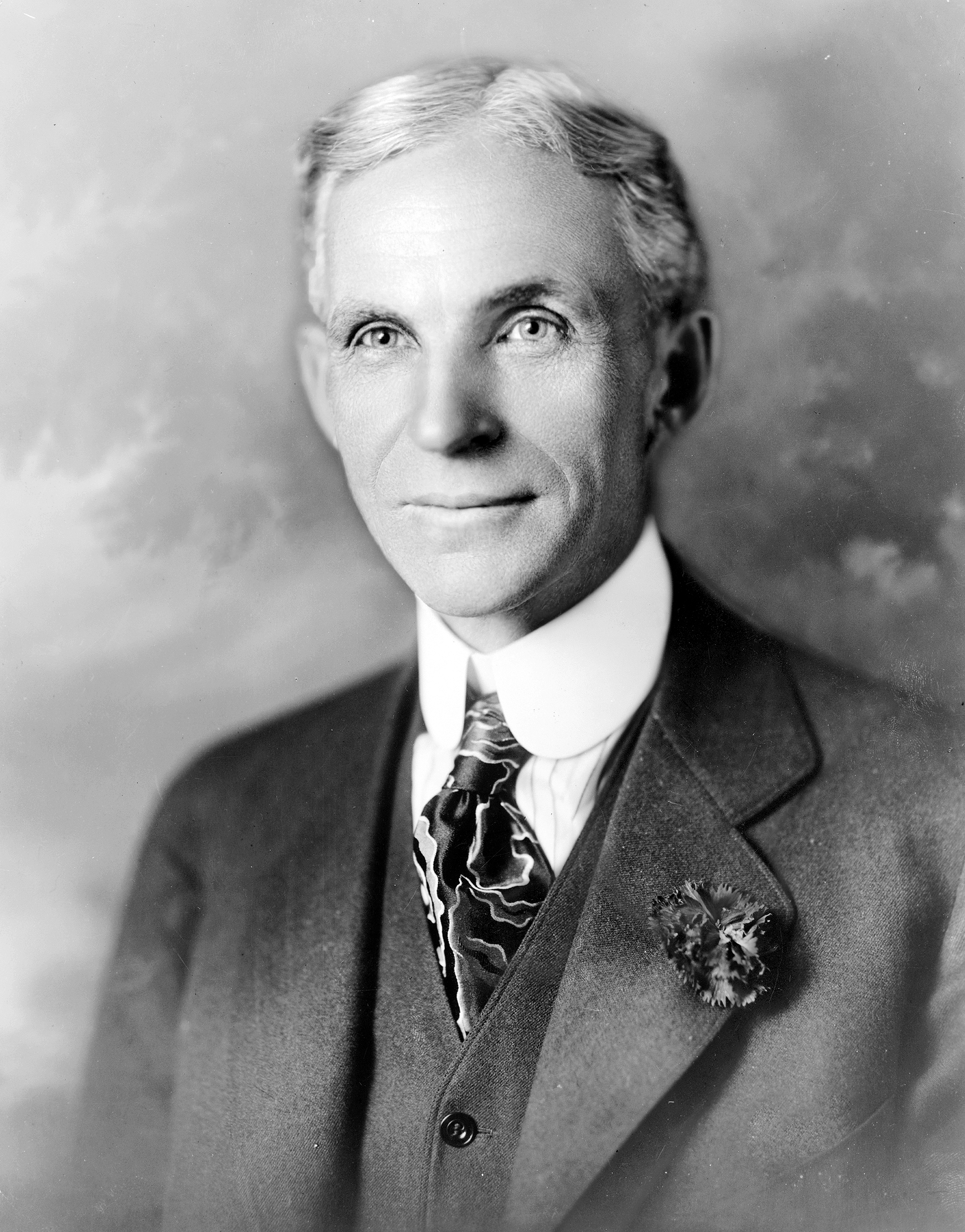
Henry Ford, 1919

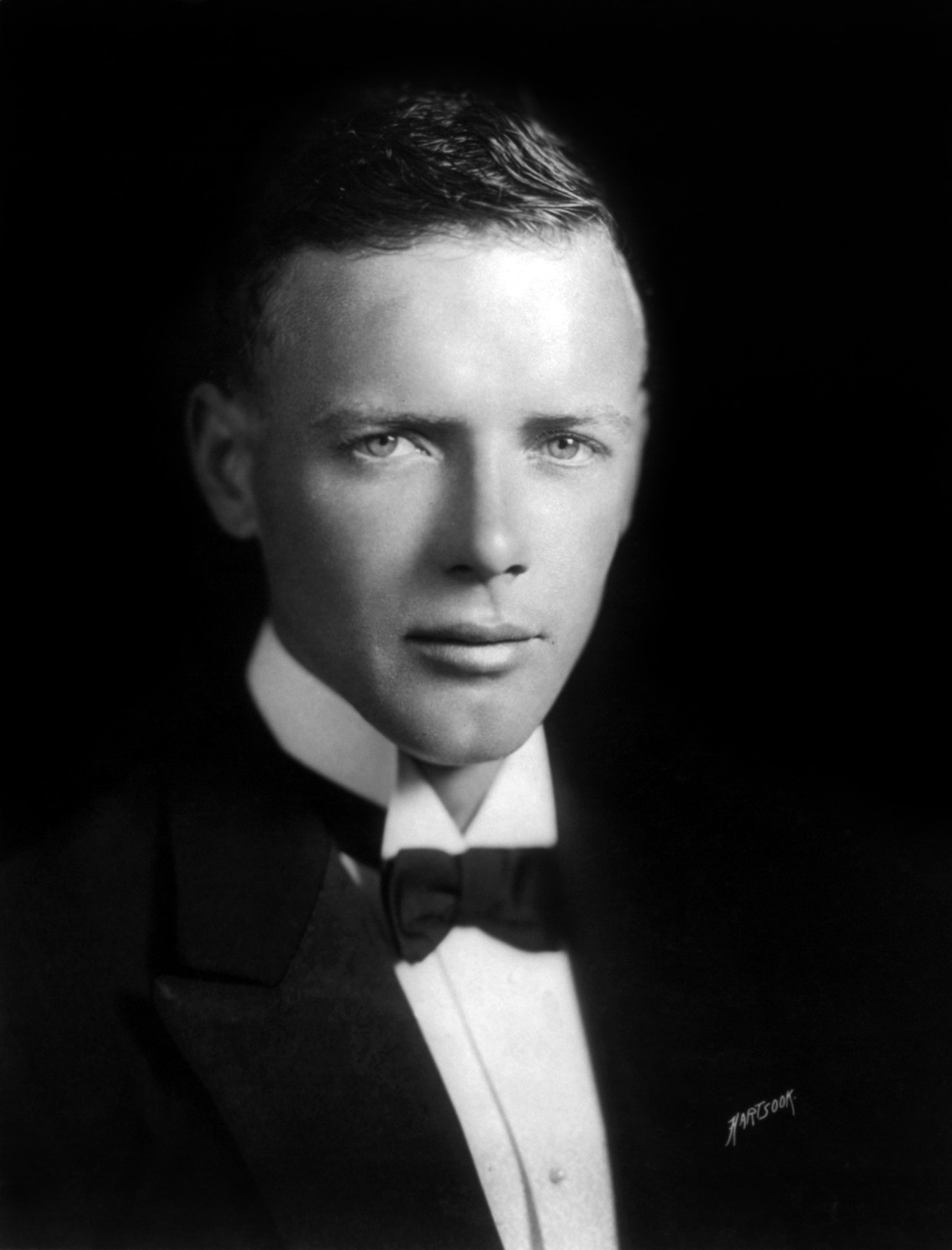
Charles Lindbergh, 1927
