= Thomas Flint Jr. (California politician) =

American politician (1857–1936)

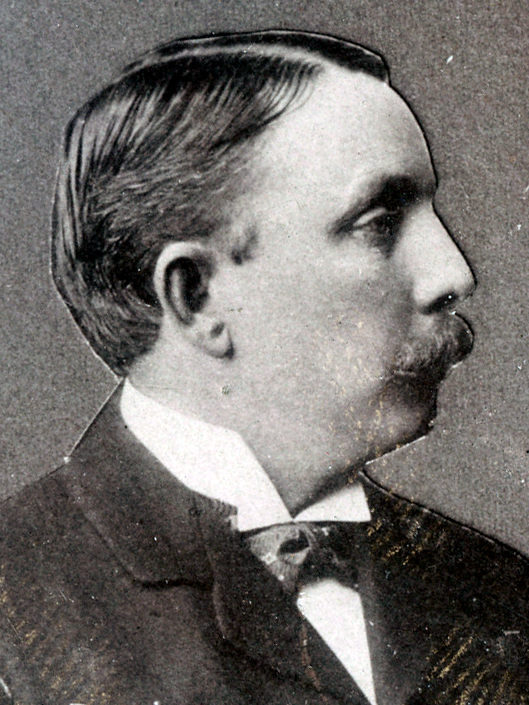
- Flint in 1899

29th President pro tempore of the California State Senate
- In office January 7, 1895 – March 14, 1903
- Preceded by: R. B. Carpenter
- Succeeded by: Edward I. Wolfe

Member of the California State Senate
- In office January 2, 1893 – January 2, 1905
- Preceded by: James D. Byrnes
- Succeeded by: Charles B. Greenwell
- Constituency: 33rd district
- In office January 7, 1889 – January 2, 1893
- Preceded by: Bradley Varnum Sargent
- Succeeded by: Orestes Orr
- Constituency: 35th district

Personal details
- Born: Thomas Flint Jr. May 29, 1857 San Juan Bautista, California, U.S.
- Died: November 18, 1936 (aged 79) Hollister, California, U.S.
- Party: Republican
- Spouse: Ada Marie Fisk (m. 1896)
- Children: 5

Thomas Flint Jr. (May 29, 1857 – November 18, 1936) was an American politician from California who served in the California State Senate as a Republican. He also served as President pro tempore of the State Senate.

== Biography ==
Flint was born on May 29, 1857 in San Juan Bautista, California, the son of Thomas Flint who would later serve in the California State Senate as a Republican.

Between in the 1870s, Flint was on the Monterey County Board of Supervisors where he was the chairman, and after 1874 he was on the San Benito County Board of Supervisors. In 1888, Flint was elected to the California State Senate from the 35th district as a Republican. In 1892, Flint was reelected to the State Senate, this time from the 33rd district, and he was reelected again from this district in 1896 and 1900. He served as the 29th President pro tempore of the California State Senate from 1895 to 1903. In the 1902 California gubernatorial election, Flint was a primary candidate for Governor, but did not win.

In the 1890s, Flint was on the Sutter's Fort Board of Trustees. He died in Hollister, California on November 18, 1936 at the age of 79.

== Personal life ==
Flint was married to Ada Marie Fisk in 1896. They had five children together.

Preceded by R. B. Carpenter	President pro tempore of the California State Senate; 1895 – 1903	Succeeded by Edward I. Wolfe
