= 2020 California State Senate election =

- November 3, 2020

20 seats from odd-numbered districts in the California State Senate 21 seats needed for a majority
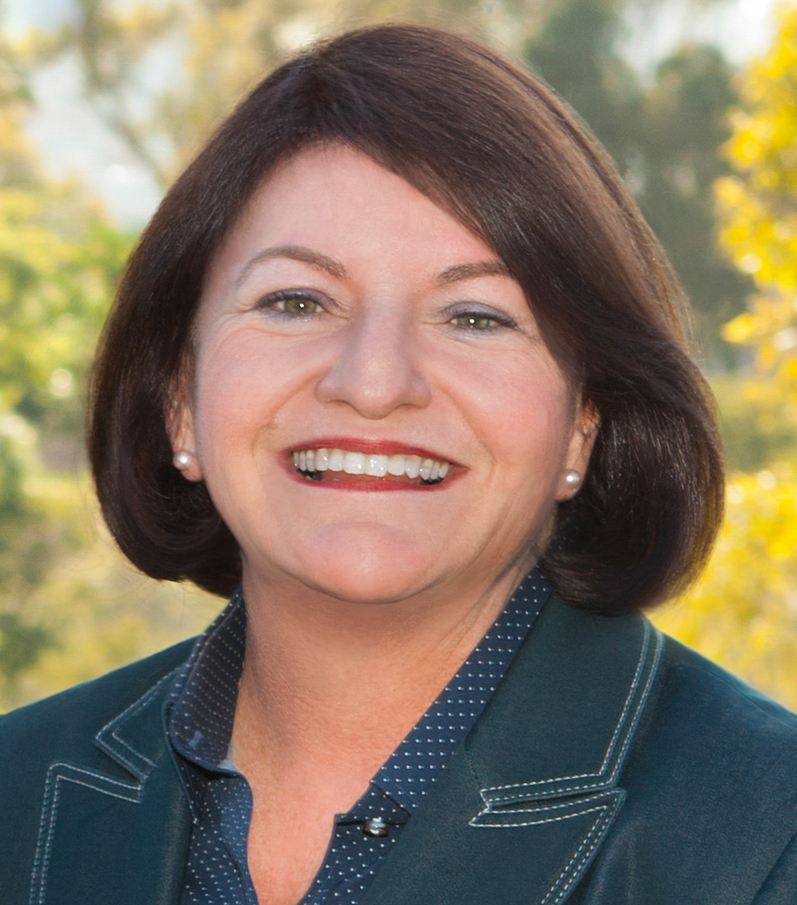

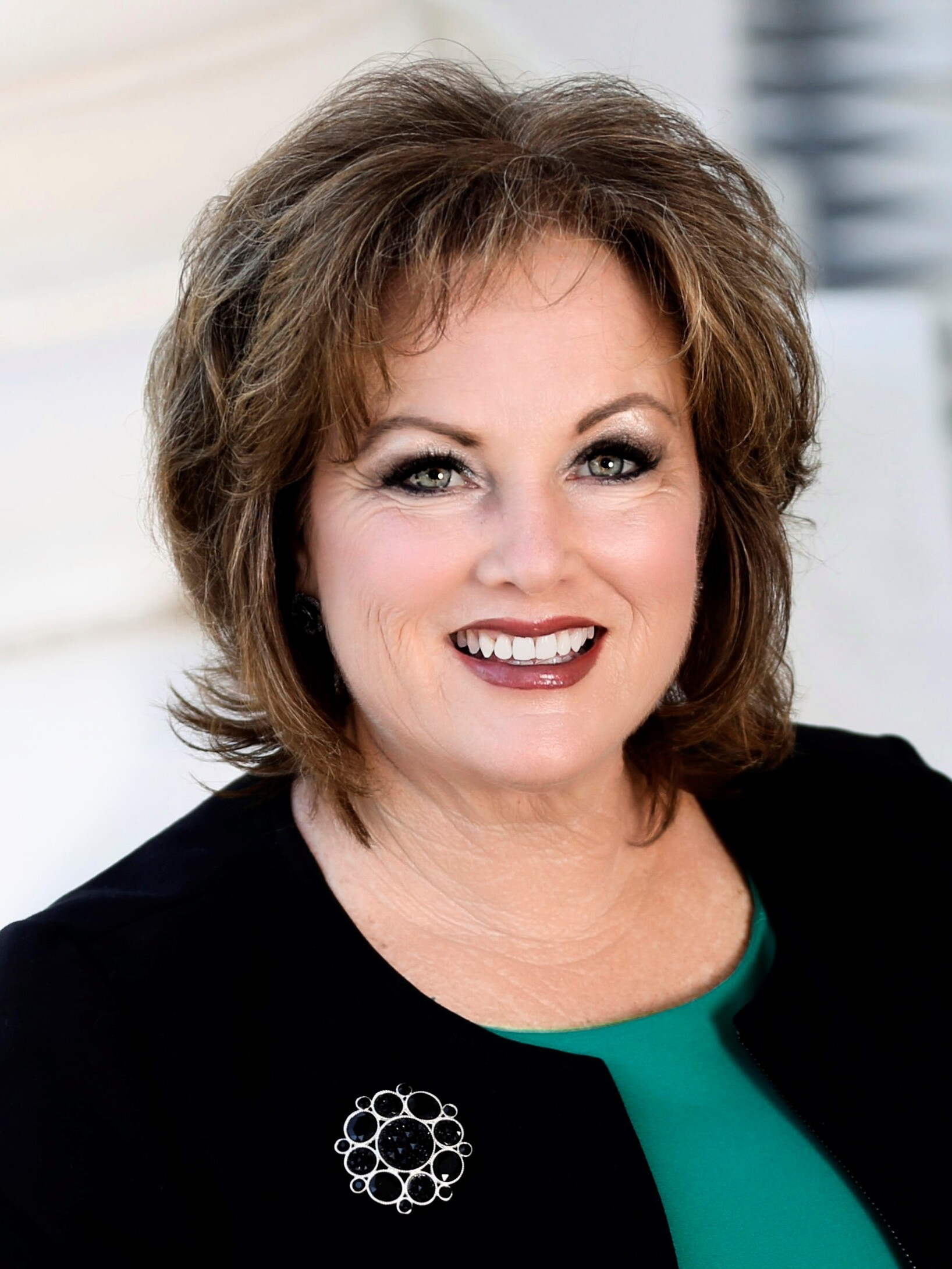
	Majority party	Minority party
Leader	Toni Atkins	Shannon Grove
Party	Democratic	Republican
Leader's seat	39th–San Diego	16th–Bakersfield
Last election	29	11
Seats after	31	9
Seat change	▲2	▼2
Popular vote	5,795,870	2,831,711
Percentage	66.09%	32.29%
- Results: Democratic gain Democratic hold Republican hold No election held
President pro tempore before election
Toni Atkins
Democratic
President pro tempore
Toni Atkins
Democratic

The 2020 California State Senate election was held on Tuesday, November 3, 2020, with the primary election scheduled for March 3, 2020. Voters in the 20 odd-numbered districts of the California State Senate elected their representatives. The elections coincided with the elections for other offices, including for U.S. president and the state assembly.

== Predictions ==
Source	Ranking	As of
The Cook Political Report	Safe D	October 21, 2020
Sabato's Crystal Ball	Safe D	May 7, 2020

== Overview ==
=== Primary elections ===
2020 California State Senate election Primary election – March 3, 2020
Party	Votes	Percentage	Candidates	Advancing to general	Seats contesting
Democratic	3,274,204	71.23%	38	23	20
Republican	1,218,374	26.51%	22	15	15
No party preference	62,094	1.35%	5	0	0
American Independent	34,253	0.75%	1	1	1
Libertarian	7,036	0.15%	4	1	1
Green	530	0.01%	1	0	0
Totals	4,596,491	100.00%	61	40	—

=== General elections ===
2020 California State Senate election General election – November 3, 2020
Party	Votes	%	Before	Up	Won	After	+/–
Democratic	5,795,870	66.09	29	15	17	31	▲2
Republican	2,831,711	32.29	11	5	3	9	▼2
American Independent	89,080	1.02	0	0	0	0	Steady
Libertarian	53,256	0.61	0	0	0	0	Steady
Totals	8,769,917	100.00	40	20	20	40	—

== Retiring incumbents ==
- 5th: Cathleen Galgiani (D–Stockton): Termed out of office
- 13th: Jerry Hill (D–San Mateo): Termed out of office
- 15th: Jim Beall (D–San Jose): Termed out of office
- 17th: Bill Monning (D–Carmel): Termed out of office
- 19th: Hannah-Beth Jackson (D–Santa Barbara): Termed out of office
- 23rd: Mike Morrell (R–Rancho Cucamonga): Termed out of office

== Results ==
=== District 1 ===
The 1st district stretches along the eastern edge of the state from the Oregon border to the Lake Tahoe area, wrapping around the Sacramento Valley along the northern Sierra Nevada to the eastern Sacramento suburbs. The incumbent was Republican Brian Dahle, who was elected in a special election with 53.9% of the vote in 2019.

==== Candidates ====
- Brian Dahle (Republican), incumbent state senator
- Linda Kelleher (no party preference), retired teacher
- Pamela Dawn Swartz (Democratic), businesswoman

2020 California's 1st State Senate district election
Primary election
Party	Candidate	Votes	%
Republican	Brian Dahle (incumbent)	200,537	57.7
Democratic	Pamela Dawn Swartz	125,585	36.1
No party preference	Linda Kelleher	21,557	6.2
Total votes		347,679	100.0
General election
Republican	Brian Dahle (incumbent)	326,836	59.7
Democratic	Pamela Dawn Swartz	220,563	40.3
Total votes		547,399	100.0
Republican hold			

=== District 3 ===
The 3rd district encompasses the northern San Francisco Bay Area and the Sacramento–San Joaquin River Delta regions. It includes parts of the North Bay, Wine Country, and the Sacramento Valley. The incumbent was Democrat Bill Dodd, who was elected with 58.1% of the vote in 2016.

==== Candidates ====
- Bill Dodd (Democratic), incumbent state senator

2020 California's 3rd State Senate district election
Primary election
Party	Candidate	Votes	%
Democratic	Bill Dodd (incumbent)	212,004	98.6
Republican	Carlos Santamaria (write-in)	2,126	1.0
Green	Karen I. Nyhus (write-in)	530	0.2
No party preference	Jaclyn Qirreh (write-in)	421	0.2
Total votes		215,081	100.0
General election
Democratic	Bill Dodd (incumbent)	323,317	68.4
Republican	Carlos Santamaria	149,461	31.6
Total votes		472,778	100.0
Democratic hold			

=== District 5 ===
The 5th district is centered on the Sacramento–San Joaquin River Delta and forms the gateway between the Central Valley, the San Francisco Bay Area, the Sacramento metropolitan area, and Gold Country. The incumbent was Democrat Cathleen Galgiani, who was term-limited and could not run for reelection.

==== Candidates ====
- Jesús Andrade (Republican), Stockton city councilman
- Susan Eggman (Democratic), state assemblywoman for California's 13th State Assembly district
- Kathleen A. Garcia (Republican), Stockton Unified School District board member
- Mani Grewal (Democratic), Modesto city councilman
- Jim Ridenour (Republican), law enforcement contractor, former Modesto mayor

2020 California's 5th State Senate district election
Primary election
Party	Candidate	Votes	%
Democratic	Susan Eggman	71,808	34.9
Republican	Jim Ridenour	49,398	24.0
Democratic	Mani Grewal	40,086	19.5
Republican	Jesús Andrade	32,836	16.0
Republican	Kathleen A. Garcia	11,499	5.6
Total votes		205,627	100.0
General election
Democratic	Susan Eggman	217,651	54.9
Republican	Jim Ridenour	178,915	45.1
Total votes		396,566	100.0
Democratic hold			

=== District 7 ===
The 7th district is located in the East Bay east of the Berkeley Hills, taking in suburban and bedroom communities of San Francisco Bay Area. The incumbent was Democrat Steve Glazer, who was re-elected with 66.7% of the vote in 2016.

==== Candidates ====
- Steve Glazer (Democratic), incumbent state senator
- Julie Mobley (Republican), community volunteer
- Marisol Rubio (Democratic), health care provider

2020 California's 7th State Senate district election
Primary election
Party	Candidate	Votes	%
Democratic	Steve Glazer (incumbent)	135,123	48.3
Republican	Julie Mobley	76,180	27.2
Democratic	Marisol Rubio	68,362	24.4
Total votes		279,665	100.0
General election
Democratic	Steve Glazer (incumbent)	339,925	66.0
Republican	Julie Mobley	174,729	34.0
Total votes		514,654	100.0
Democratic hold			

=== District 9 ===
The 9th district encompasses the northern East Bay, stretching along the eastern shores of San Francisco Bay and San Pablo Bay. The incumbent was Democrat Nancy Skinner, who was elected with 62.2% of the vote in 2016.

==== Candidates ====
- Nancy Skinner (Democrat), incumbent state senator

==== Debate ====
2020 California's 9th State Senate district debate
No.	Date	Host	Moderator	Link	Democratic	Libertarian
Key: P Participant A Absent N Not invited I Invited W Withdrawn						
Key: P Participant A Absent N Not invited I Invited W Withdrawn					Nancy Skinner	Jamie Dluzak
1	Sep. 23, 2020	League of Women Voters of Berkely, Albany, Emeryville; League of Women Voters of Piedmont	Elise Mills	YouTube	P	P

2020 California's 9th State Senate district election
Primary election
Party	Candidate	Votes	%
Democratic	Nancy Skinner (incumbent)	263,751	99.95
Libertarian	Jamie Dluzak (write-in)	126	0.05
Total votes		263,877	100.0
General election
Democratic	Nancy Skinner (incumbent)	404,455	88.4
Libertarian	Jamie Dluzak	53,256	11.6
Total votes		457,711	100.0
Democratic hold			

=== District 11 ===
The 11th district encompasses the northern San Francisco Peninsula, including the consolidated city-county of San Francisco and northern San Mateo County. The incumbent was Democrat Scott Wiener, who was elected with 51.0% of the vote in 2016.

==== Candidates ====
- Jackie Fielder (Democratic), member of the Three Affiliated Tribes and political activist
- Erin Smith (Republican), entrepreneur
- Scott Wiener (Democratic), incumbent state senator

2020 California's 11th State Senate district election
Primary election
Party	Candidate	Votes	%
Democratic	Scott Wiener (incumbent)	167,124	55.7
Democratic	Jackie Fielder	99,566	33.2
Republican	Erin Smith	33,321	11.1
Total votes		300,011	100.0
General election
Democratic	Scott Wiener (incumbent)	254,635	57.1
Democratic	Jackie Fielder	191,065	42.9
Total votes		445,700	100.0
Democratic hold			

=== District 13 ===
The 13th district encompasses the San Francisco Peninsula and the northwestern reaches of Silicon Valley. The incumbent was Democrat Jerry Hill, who was term-limited and could not run for reelection.

==== Candidates ====
- Josh Becker (Democratic), former venture capitalist and former CEO of Lex Machina
- Michael Brownrigg (Democratic), Burlingame city councilman
- Alexander Glew (Republican), engineer
- Sally Lieber (Democratic), former state assemblywoman for California's 22nd State Assembly district (2002–2008) and former mayor of Mountain View
- Shelly Masur (Democratic), Redwood City councilwoman
- Annie Oliva (Democratic), Millbrae city councilwoman, real estate agent
- John H. Webster (Libertarian), software engineer

2020 California's 13th State Senate district election
Primary election
Party	Candidate	Votes	%
Democratic	Josh Becker	66,428	23.8
Republican	Alexander Glew	48,378	17.3
Democratic	Sally Lieber	47,773	17.1
Democratic	Shelly Masur	45,211	16.2
Democratic	Annie Oliva	33,311	11.9
Democratic	Mike Brownrigg	32,481	11.6
Libertarian	John H. Webster	5,910	2.1
Total votes		279,492	100.0
General election
Democratic	Josh Becker	348,005	75.4
Republican	Alexander Glew	113,315	24.6
Total votes		461,320	100.0
Democratic hold			

=== District 15 ===
The 15th district encompasses most of Silicon Valley, centered around San Jose. The incumbent was Democrat Jim Beall, who was term-limited and could not run for reelection.

==== Candidates ====
- Nora Campos (Democratic), former state assemblywoman for California's 23rd State Assembly district (2010–2012) and California's 27th State Assembly district (2012–2016) and candidate for California's 15th State Senate district in 2016
- Dave Cortese (Democratic), Santa Clara County supervisor
- Ken Del Valle (Republican), U.S. Army staff sergeant
- Tim Gildersleeve (no party preference), candidate for U.S. Senate in 2016 and 2018
- Robert Howell (Republican), mechanical equipment manufacturer
- Johnny Khamis (no party preference), San Jose city councilman
- Ann M. Ravel (Democratic), former chair of Federal Election Commission

2020 California's 15th State Senate district election
Primary election
Party	Candidate	Votes	%
Democratic	Dave Cortese	79,507	33.9
Democratic	Ann Ravel	51,752	22.1
Democratic	Nora Campos	39,683	16.9
Republican	Robert Howell	23,840	10.2
No party preference	Johnny Khamis	23,747	10.1
Republican	Ken Del Valle	14,280	6.1
No party preference	Tim Gildersleeve	1,635	0.7
Total votes		234,444	100.0
General election
Democratic	Dave Cortese	212,207	54.8
Democratic	Ann M. Ravel	175,203	45.2
Total votes		387,410	100.0
Democratic hold			

=== District 17 ===
The 17th district encompasses the extreme southern parts of the San Francisco Bay Area and northern Central Coast centering on the coastal Monterey Bay Area. The incumbent was Democrat Bill Monning, who was term-limited and could not run for reelection.

==== Candidates ====
- Maria Cadenas (Democratic), executive director of Santa Cruz Community Ventures
- John Laird (Democratic), former secretary of California Natural Resources Agency and former state assemblyman for California's 27th State Assembly district (2002–2008)
- John M. Nevill (Democratic), rancher and Republican candidate for California's 30th State Assembly district in 2016
- Vicki Nohrden (Republican), businesswoman and candidate for California's 29th State Assembly district in 2018

2020 California's 17th State Senate district election
Primary election
Party	Candidate	Votes	%
Democratic	John Laird	138,986	44.4
Republican	Vicki Nohrden	98,649	31.5
Democratic	Maria Cadenas	65,525	20.9
Democratic	John M. Nevill	10,040	3.2
Total votes		313,200	100.0
General election
Democratic	John Laird	320,090	64.7
Republican	Vicki Nohrden	174,587	35.3
Total votes		494,677	100.0
Democratic hold			

=== District 19 ===
The 19th district takes in the southern Central Coast, including all of Santa Barbara County and western Ventura County. The incumbent was Democrat Hannah-Beth Jackson, who was term-limited and could not run for reelection.

==== Candidates ====
- Monique Limón (Democratic), state assemblywoman
- Gary G. Michaels (Republican), telecommunications consultant
- Anastasia Stone (no party preference), maternal health professional

2020 California's 19th State Senate district
Primary election
Party	Candidate	Votes	%
Democratic	Monique Limón	152,745	61.1
Republican	Gary J. Michaels	82,466	33.0
No party preference	Anastasia Stone	14,734	5.9
Total votes		249,945	100.0
General election
Democratic	Monique Limón	272,442	64.5
Republican	Gary J. Michaels	150,089	35.5
Total votes		422,531	100.0
Democratic hold			

=== District 21 ===
The 21st district takes in northern Los Angeles County and parts of the High Desert including, the Antelope Valley, Victor Valley, and most of the Santa Clarita Valley. The incumbent was Republican Scott Wilk, who was elected with 52.8% of the vote in 2016.

==== Candidates ====
- Warren Heaton (Democratic), immigration attorney and professor at College of the Canyons
- Steve Hill (Democratic), businessman
- Dana LaMon (Democratic), retired administrative judge
- Kipp Mueller (Democratic), workers rights attorney
- Scott Wilk (Republican), incumbent state senator

2020 California's 21st State Senate district election
Primary election
Party	Candidate	Votes	%
Republican	Scott Wilk (incumbent)	96,701	53.1
Democratic	Kipp Mueller	34,232	18.8
Democratic	Dana LaMon	21,911	12.0
Democratic	Warren Heaton	18,554	10.2
Democratic	Steve Hill	10,863	6.0
Total votes		182,261	100.0
General election
Republican	Scott Wilk (incumbent)	199,342	50.8
Democratic	Kipp Mueller	193,202	49.2
Total votes		392,544	100.0
Republican hold			

=== District 23 ===
The 23rd district encompasses a wide arc of the Inland Empire, circling clockwise from Rancho Cucamonga in the northwest to Menifee in the south. It also includes several resort communities in the San Bernardino Mountains and a sliver of the High Desert. The incumbent was Republican Mike Morrell, who was term-limited and could not run for reelection.

==== Candidates ====
- Kris Goodfellow (Democratic), businesswoman and former journalist
- Abigail Medina (Democratic), president of San Bernardino City Unified School District board
- Rosilicie Ochoa Bogh (Republican), real estate agent and Yucaipa-Calimesa Joint Unified School District trustee
- Cristina Puraci (Republican), president of Redlands Unified School District board
- Lloyd White (Republican), Beaumont city councilman

2020 California's 23rd State Senate district election
Primary election
Party	Candidate	Votes	%
Democratic	Abigail Medina	59,881	28.1
Republican	Rosilicie Ochoa Bogh	52,820	24.8
Republican	Lloyd White	46,267	21.7
Democratic	Kris Goodfellow	37,153	17.4
Republican	Cristina Puraci	17,028	8.0
Total votes		213,149	100.0
General election
Republican	Rosilicie Ochoa Bogh	224,945	52.5
Democratic	Abigail Medina	203,403	47.5
Total votes		428,348	100.0
Republican hold			

=== District 25 ===
The 25th district encompasses the San Gabriel Mountains and its adjacent San Gabriel Valley foothill communities, anchored by Glendale and Pasadena. The incumbent was Democrat Anthony Portantino, who was elected with 57.8% of the vote in 2016.

==== Candidates ====
- Anthony Portantino (Democratic), incumbent state senator

2020 California's 25th State Senate district election
Primary election
Party	Candidate	Votes	%
Democratic	Anthony Portantino (incumbent)	185,405	99.1
Republican	Kathleen Hazelton (write-in)	952	0.5
Libertarian	Evan Wecksell (write-in)	811	0.4
Total votes		187,168	100.0
General election
Democratic	Anthony Portantino (incumbent)	295,432	64.0
Republican	Kathleen Hazelton	166,529	36.0
Total votes		461,961	100.0
Democratic hold			

=== District 27 ===
The 27th district takes in the Conejo Valley, parts of the San Fernando Valley, and a slice of the Santa Clarita Valley, including most of Los Angeles's western suburbs, as well as Simi Valley and Thousand Oaks. The incumbent was Democrat Henry Stern, who was elected with 55.9% of the vote in 2016.

==== Candidates ====
- Houman Salem (Republican), businessman
- Henry Stern (Democratic), incumbent state senator

2020 California's 27th State Senate district election
Primary election
Party	Candidate	Votes	%
Democratic	Henry Stern (incumbent)	158,184	63.8
Republican	Houman Salem	89,646	36.2
Total votes		247,830	100.0
General election
Democratic	Henry Stern (incumbent)	284,797	60.2
Republican	Houman Salem	188,421	39.8
Total votes		473,218	100.0
Democratic hold			

=== District 29 ===
The 29th district straddles the intersection of Los Angeles County, Orange County, and San Bernardino County. It encompasses the northern Santa Ana Valley, including western and central Anaheim, Fullerton, and Yorba Linda. The incumbent was Republican Ling Ling Chang, who was elected in a special election with 33.8% of the vote in 2018.

==== Candidates ====
- Ling Ling Chang (Republican), incumbent state senator
- Joseph Cho (Democratic), candidate for California's 29th State Senate district in 2018 and former Cerritos city councilman
- Josh Newman (Democratic), former state senator for California's 29th State Senate district (2016–2018)

2020 California's 29th State Senate district election
Primary election
Party	Candidate	Votes	%
Republican	Ling Ling Chang (incumbent)	98,687	47.4
Democratic	Josh Newman	69,732	33.5
Democratic	Joseph Cho	39,643	19.1
Total votes		208,062	100.0
General election
Democratic	Josh Newman	214,456	51.3
Republican	Ling Ling Chang (incumbent)	203,762	48.7
Total votes		418,218	100.0
Democratic gain from Republican			

=== District 31 ===
The 31st district takes in northwestern Riverside County, including Corona, Moreno Valley, and Riverside. The incumbent was Democrat Richard Roth, who was re-elected with 60.5% of the vote in 2016.

==== Candidates ====
- Richard Roth (Democratic), incumbent state senator

2020 California's 31st State Senate district election
Primary election
Party	Candidate	Votes	%
Democratic	Richard Roth (incumbent)	106,435	98.9
Republican	Rod D. Taylor (write-in)	959	0.9
Libertarian	John K. Farr (write-in)	189	0.2
Total votes		107,583	100.0
General election
Democratic	Richard Roth (incumbent)	216,910	59.0
Republican	Rod D. Taylor	150,734	41.0
Total votes		367,644	100.0
Democratic hold			

=== District 33 ===
The 33rd district encompasses a strip of the Gateway Cities, stretching from parts of eastern Los Angeles to the coast, including the Port of Long Beach and a significant portion of Long Beach itself. The incumbent was Democrat Lena Gonzalez, who was elected in a special election with 69.8% of the vote in 2019.

==== Candidates ====
- Lena Gonzalez (Democratic), incumbent state senator

2020 California's 33rd State Senate district election
Primary election
Party	Candidate	Votes	%
Democratic	Lena Gonzalez (incumbent)	109,428	99.8
Democratic	Elizabeth C. Castillo (write-in)	205	0.2
Total votes		109,633	100.0
General election
Democratic	Lena Gonzalez (incumbent)	164,752	61.8
Democratic	Elizabeth C. Castillo	101,831	38.2
Total votes		266,583	100.0
Democratic hold			

=== District 35 ===
The 35th district takes in the inland portions of the South Bay stretching from Inglewood in the north down to the Port of Los Angeles and the San Pedro neighborhood of Los Angeles. The incumbent was Democrat Steven Bradford, who was elected with 53.5% of the vote in 2016.

==== Candidates ====
- Steven Craig Bradford (Democratic), incumbent state senator
- Anthony Perry (American Independent), substitute teacher

2020 California's 35th State Senate district election
Primary election
Party	Candidate	Votes	%
Democratic	Steven Craig Bradford (incumbent)	106,742	75.7
American Independent	Anthony Perry	34,253	24.3
Total votes		140,995	100.0
General election
Democratic	Steven Craig Bradford (incumbent)	234,881	72.5
American Independent	Anthony Perry	89,080	27.5
Total votes		323,961	100.0
Democratic hold			

=== District 37 ===
The 37th district encompasses central Orange County, centered on eastern Anaheim and Irvine. The incumbent was Republican John Moorlach, who was re-elected with 57.0% of the vote in 2016.

==== Candidates ====
- Katrina Foley (Democratic), mayor of Costa Mesa
- Dave Min (Democratic), law professor at UC Irvine and candidate for California's 45th congressional district in 2018
- John Moorlach (Republican), incumbent state senator

2020 California's 37th State Senate district general election results by county supervisorial district Map legend: Min—80–90%; Min—50–60%; Min—40–50%

2020 California's 37th State Senate district primary results by county supervisorial district Map legend: Moorlach—50–60%; Moorlach—40–50%; Min—40–50%

2020 California's 37th State Senate district election
Primary election
Party	Candidate	Votes	%
Republican	John Moorlach (incumbent)	132,275	47.3
Democratic	Dave Min	78,293	28.0
Democratic	Katrina Foley	68,952	24.7
Total votes		279,520	100.0
General election
Democratic	Dave Min	270,522	51.1
Republican	John Moorlach (incumbent)	258,421	48.9
Total votes		528,943	100.0
Democratic gain from Republican			

=== District 39 ===
The 39th district is centered on downtown San Diego and mainly stretches along the city's coastline, including part of San Diego Bay. The incumbent was Democrat State Senate President pro tempore Toni Atkins, who was elected with 62.5% of the vote in 2016.

==== Candidates ====
- Toni Atkins (Democratic), incumbent state senator

2020 California's 39th State Senate district election
Primary election
Party	Candidate	Votes	%
Democratic	Toni Atkins (incumbent)	212,626	91.9
Republican	Linda Blankenship (write-in)	18,643	8.1
Total votes		231,269	100.0
General election
Democratic	Toni Atkins (incumbent)	336,467	66.2
Republican	Linda Blankenship	171,952	33.8
Total votes		508,419	100.0
Democratic hold			

== See also ==
- 2020 United States elections
- 2020 United States House of Representatives elections in California
- 2020 California State Assembly election
- 2020 California elections
