= Senator Sturgeon (disambiguation) =

Daniel Sturgeon (1789–1878) was a U.S. Senator from Pennsylvania from 1840 to 1851. Senator Sturgeon may also refer to:

- Al Sturgeon (born 1956), Iowa State Senate
- B. B. Sturgeon (1856–1931), Texas State Senate
- Laura Sturgeon (born 1965), Delaware State Senate
- Vernon L. Sturgeon (1915–2004), California State Senate
