= 2016 California State Senate election =

- November 8, 2016

20 seats from odd-numbered districts in the California State Senate 21 seats needed for a majority
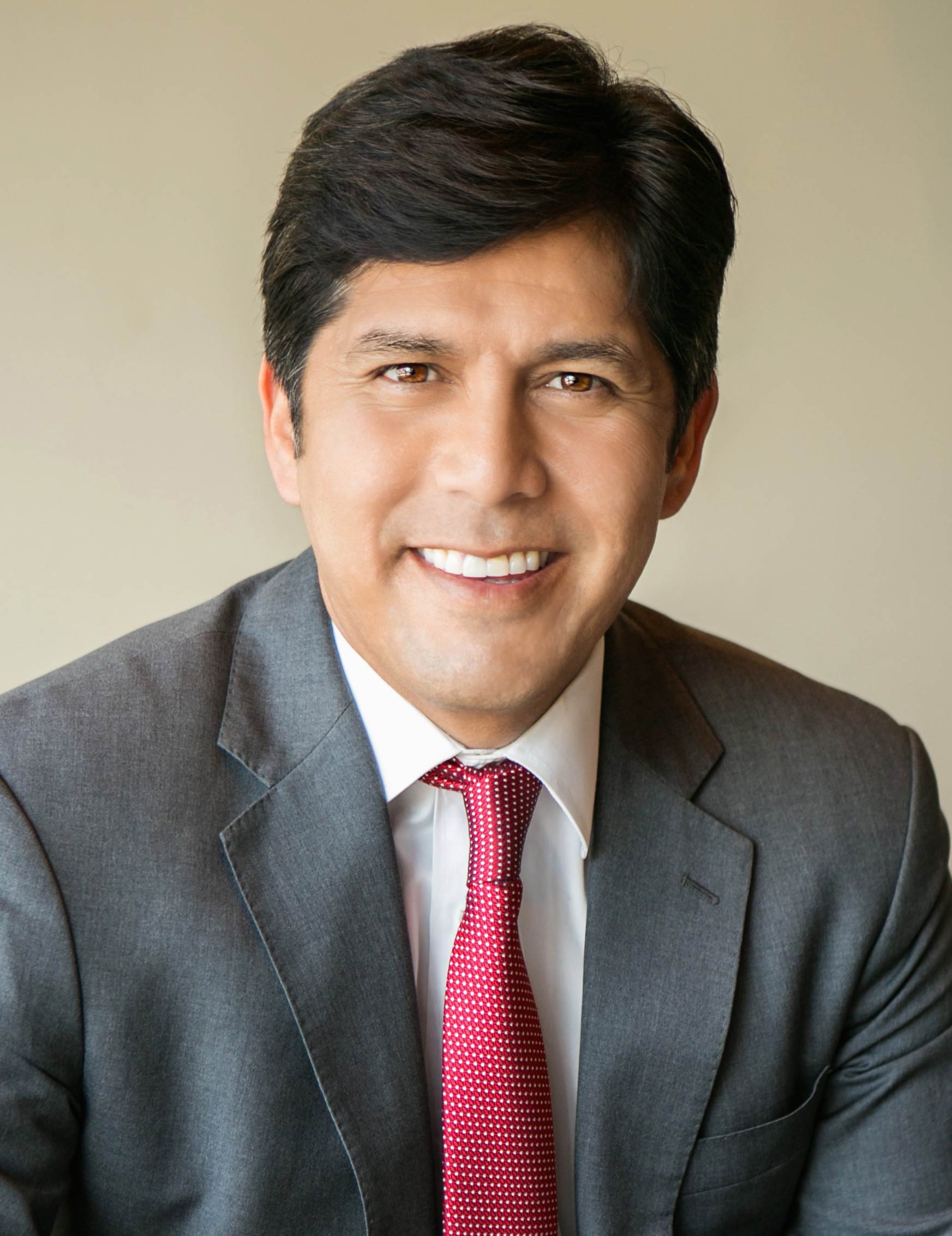

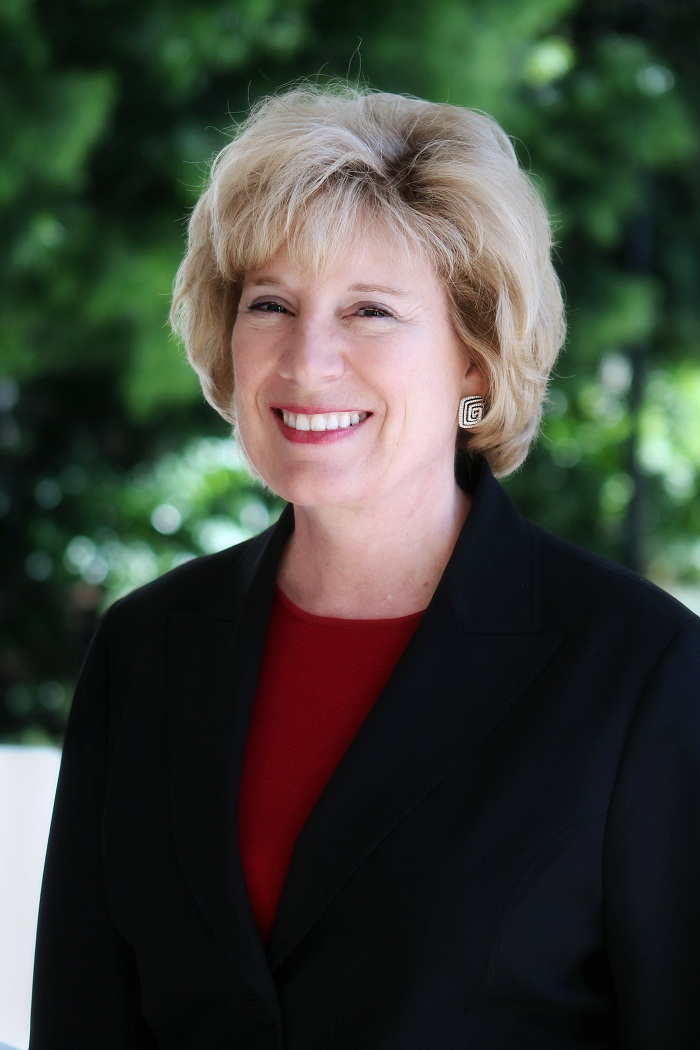
	Majority party	Minority party
Leader	Kevin de León	Jean Fuller
Party	Democratic	Republican
Leader's seat	24th–Los Angeles	16th–Bakersfield
Seats before	26	14
Seats after	27	13
Seat change	▲1	▼1
Popular vote	4,769,557	2,250,103
Percentage	67.48%	31.84%
- Results: Democratic gain Democratic hold Republican hold No election held
President pro tempore before election
Kevin de León
Democratic
President pro tempore-designate
Kevin de León
Democratic

The 2016 California State Senate election were held on Tuesday, November 8, 2016, with the primary election on June 7, 2016. Voters in the 20 odd-numbered districts of the California State Senate elected their representatives. The elections coincided with the elections for other offices, including for U.S. President and the state assembly.

Only one seat changed hands: the 29th district, which belonged to outgoing former Republican Minority Leader Bob Huff. As a result of the pickup by Democrat Josh Newman, the California Democratic Party regained a two-thirds supermajority in the chamber that it had previously lost in 2014.

== Overview ==
California State Senate elections, 2016 Primary election — June 7, 2016
Party	Votes	Percentage	Candidates	Advancing to general	Seats contesting
Democratic	2,724,063	66.59%	42	25	20
Republican	1,353,572	33.09%	25	14	14
Libertarian	13,065	0.32%	2	1	1
Totals	4,090,700	100.00%	69	40	—

California State Senate elections, 2016 General election — November 8, 2016
Party	Votes	Percentage	Not up	Contested	Before	After	+/–
Democratic	4,769,557	67.48%	11	15	26	27	▲1
Republican	2,250,103	31.84%	9	5	14	13	▼1
Libertarian	48,316	0.68%	0	0	0	0	Steady
Totals	7,067,976	100.00%	20	20	40	40	—

↓
27	13
Democratic	Republican

== Predictions ==
Source	Ranking	As of
Governing	Safe D	October 12, 2016

== Results ==
=== District 1 ===
California's 1st State Senate district election, 2016
Primary election
Party	Candidate	Votes	%
Republican	Ted Gaines (incumbent)	140,739	49.4
Democratic	Rob Rowen	104,262	36.6
Republican	Steven Baird	39,958	14.1
Total votes		284,959	100.0
General election
Republican	Ted Gaines (incumbent)	287,314	64.0
Democratic	Rob Rowen	161,502	36.0
Total votes		448,816	100.0
Republican hold			

=== District 3 ===
California's 3rd State Senate district election, 2016
Primary election
Party	Candidate	Votes	%
Democratic	Bill Dodd	90,396	37.4
Democratic	Mariko Yamada	72,243	29.9
Republican	Greg "Coach" Coppes	54,525	22.6
Democratic	Gabe Griess	24,540	10.2
Total votes		241,704	100.0
General election
Democratic	Bill Dodd	207,927	58.1
Democratic	Mariko Yamada	149,701	41.9
Total votes		357,628	100.0
Democratic hold			

=== District 5 ===
California's 5th State Senate district election, 2016
Primary election
Party	Candidate	Votes	%
Democratic	Cathleen Galgiani (incumbent)	96,710	56.8
Republican	Alan Nakanishi	47,355	27.8
Republican	Samuel Anderson	26,343	15.5
Total votes		170,408	100.0
General election
Democratic	Cathleen Galgiani (incumbent)	174,847	56.7
Republican	Alan Nakanishi	133,604	43.3
Total votes		308,451	100.0
Democratic hold			

=== District 7 ===
California's 7th State Senate district election, 2016
Primary election
Party	Candidate	Votes	%
Democratic	Steve Glazer (incumbent)	122,186	54.3
Republican	Joseph Alexander Rubay	61,169	27.2
Democratic	Guy Moore	41,497	18.5
Total votes		224,852	100.0
General election
Democratic	Steve Glazer (incumbent)	270,485	66.7
Republican	Joseph Rubay	135,122	33.3
Total votes		405,607	100.0
Democratic hold			

=== District 9 ===
California's 9th State Senate district election, 2016
Primary election
Party	Candidate	Votes	%
Democratic	Nancy Skinner	116,710	47.8
Democratic	Sandré Swanson	74,365	30.5
Democratic	Katherine Grace Welch	32,698	13.4
Republican	Rich Kinney	20,287	8.3
Total votes		244,060	100.0
General election
Democratic	Nancy Skinner	236,133	62.2
Democratic	Sandré Swanson	143,573	37.8
Total votes		379,706	100.0
Democratic hold			

=== District 11 ===
California's 11th State Senate district election, 2016
Primary election
Party	Candidate	Votes	%
Democratic	Jane Kim	118,582	45.3
Democratic	Scott Wiener	117,913	45.1
Republican	Ken Loo	25,189	9.6
Democratic	Michael A. Petrelis (write-in)	4	0.0
Total votes		261,688	100.0
General election
Democratic	Scott Wiener	209,462	51.0
Democratic	Jane Kim	201,316	49.0
Total votes		410,778	100.0
Democratic hold			

=== District 13 ===
California's 13th State Senate district election, 2016
Primary election
Party	Candidate	Votes	%
Democratic	Jerry Hill (incumbent)	171,411	75.6
Republican	Rick Ciardella	42,185	18.6
Libertarian	John H. Webster	13,018	5.7
Total votes		226,614	100.0
General election
Democratic	Jerry Hill (incumbent)	296,400	75.9
Republican	Rick Ciardella	94,269	24.1
Total votes		390,669	100.0
Democratic hold			

=== District 15 ===
California's 15th State Senate district election, 2016
Primary election
Party	Candidate	Votes	%
Democratic	Jim Beall (incumbent)	97,948	49.4
Democratic	Nora Campos	53,250	26.9
Republican	Chuck Page	40,783	20.6
Republican	Anthony Macias	6,147	3.1
Total votes		198,128	100.0
General election
Democratic	Jim Beall (incumbent)	196,089	62.5
Democratic	Nora Campos	117,442	37.5
Total votes		313,531	100.0
Democratic hold			

=== District 17 ===
California's 17th State Senate district election, 2016
Primary election
Party	Candidate	Votes	%
Democratic	Bill Monning (incumbent)	185,586	68.8
Republican	Palmer Kain	84,142	31.2
Total votes		269,728	100.0
General election
Democratic	Bill Monning (incumbent)	268,806	65.5
Republican	Palmer Kain	141,339	34.5
Total votes		410,145	100.0
Democratic hold			

=== District 19 ===
California's 19th State Senate district election, 2016
Primary election
Party	Candidate	Votes	%
Democratic	Hannah-Beth Jackson (incumbent)	144,422	64.1
Republican	Colin Patrick Walch	80,765	35.9
Total votes		225,187	100.0
General election
Democratic	Hannah-Beth Jackson (incumbent)	224,834	63.1
Republican	Colin Patrick Walch	131,598	37.3
Total votes		356,432	100.0
Democratic hold			

=== District 21 ===
California's 21st State Senate district election, 2016
Primary election
Party	Candidate	Votes	%
Republican	Scott Wilk	69,403	46.7
Democratic	Johnathon Levar Ervin	50,078	33.7
Democratic	Steve Hill	17,735	11.9
Republican	Star Moffatt	11,439	7.7
Total votes		148,655	100.0
General election
Republican	Scott Wilk	160,043	52.8
Democratic	Johnathon Levar Ervin	142,886	47.2
Total votes		302,929	100.0
Republican hold			

=== District 23 ===
California's 23rd State Senate district election, 2016
Primary election
Party	Candidate	Votes	%
Republican	Mike Morrell (incumbent)	93,484	54.8
Democratic	Ronald J. O'Donnell	50,850	29.8
Democratic	Mark Westwood	26,300	15.4
Total votes		170,634	100.0
General election
Republican	Mike Morrell (incumbent)	184,470	56.6
Democratic	Ronald J. O'Donnell	141,533	43.4
Total votes		326,003	100.0
Republican hold			

=== District 25 ===
California's 25th State Senate district election, 2016
Primary election
Party	Candidate	Votes	%
Republican	Michael D. Antonovich	85,663	39.5
Democratic	Anthony Portantino	58,154	26.8
Democratic	Katherine Perez-Estolano	31,166	14.4
Democratic	Chris Chahinian	14,849	6.8
Democratic	Phlunte' Riddle	14,563	6.7
Democratic	Teddy Choi	12,430	5.7
Total votes		216,825	100.0
General election
Democratic	Anthony Portantino	218,655	57.8
Republican	Michael D. Antonovich	159,014	42.2
Total votes		377,256	100.0
Democratic hold			

=== District 27 ===
California's 27th State Senate district election, 2016
Primary election
Party	Candidate	Votes	%
Republican	Steve Fazio	77,770	37.1
Democratic	Henry Stern	57,189	27.3
Democratic	Janice Kamenir-Reznik	40,250	19.2
Democratic	David Pollock	15,359	7.3
Democratic	Shawn Bayliss	12,757	6.1
Democratic	George Christopher Thomas	6,143	2.9
Total votes		209,468	100.0
General election
Democratic	Henry Stern	218,655	55.9
Republican	Steve Fazio	172,827	44.1
Total votes		377,256	100.0
Democratic hold			

=== District 29 ===
California's 29th State Senate district election, 2016
Primary election
Party	Candidate	Votes	%
Republican	Ling Ling Chang	73,514	44.0
Democratic	Josh Newman	48,754	29.2
Democratic	Sukhee Kang	44,766	26.8
Total votes		167,034	100.0
General election
Democratic	Josh Newman	160,230	50.4
Republican	Ling Ling Chang	157,732	49.6
Total votes		317,962	100.0
Democratic gain from Republican			

=== District 31 ===
California's 31st State Senate district election, 2016
Primary election
Party	Candidate	Votes	%
Democratic	Richard Roth (incumbent)	81,504	61.2
Republican	Richard Reed	51,755	38.8
Total votes		133,259	100.0
General election
Democratic	Richard Roth (incumbent)	167,574	60.5
Republican	Richard Reed	109,238	39.5
Total votes		276,812	100.0
Democratic hold			

=== District 33 ===
California's 33rd State Senate district election, 2016
Primary election
Party	Candidate	Votes	%
Democratic	Ricardo Lara (incumbent)	104,027	99.95
Libertarian	Honor Mimi Robson (write-in)	47	0.05
Total votes		104,074	100.00
General election
Democratic	Ricardo Lara (incumbent)	177,971	78.6
Libertarian	Honor Mimi Robson	48,316	21.4
Total votes		226,287	100.0
Democratic hold			

=== District 35 ===
California's 35th State Senate district election, 2016
Primary election
Party	Candidate	Votes	%
Democratic	Steven Bradford	50,998	35.6
Democratic	Warren Furutani	35,024	24.4
Democratic	Isaac Galvan	32,105	22.4
Republican	Charlotte Ann Svolos	25,197	17.6
Total votes		143,324	100.0
General election
Democratic	Steven Bradford	135,353	53.5
Democratic	Warren Furutani	117,455	46.5
Total votes		252,808	100.0
Democratic hold			

=== District 37 ===
California's 37th State Senate district election, 2016
Primary election
Party	Candidate	Votes	%
Republican	John Moorlach (incumbent)	114,540	54.8
Democratic	Ari Grayson	94,369	45.2
Total votes		208,909	100.0
General election
Republican	John Moorlach (incumbent)	228,480	57.0
Democratic	Ari Grayson	172,455	43.0
Total votes		400,935	100.0
Republican hold			

=== District 39 ===
California's 39th State Senate district election, 2016
Primary election
Party	Candidate	Votes	%
Democratic	Toni Atkins	159,970	66.3
Republican	John Renison	43,760	18.1
Republican	J. Bribiesca	26,565	11.0
Republican	Richard M. Fago	10,895	4.5
Total votes		241,190	100.0
General election
Democratic	Toni Atkins	258,686	62.5
Republican	John Renison	155,053	37.5
Total votes		413,739	100.0
Democratic hold			
