= Jackie Fielder =

American politician and activist

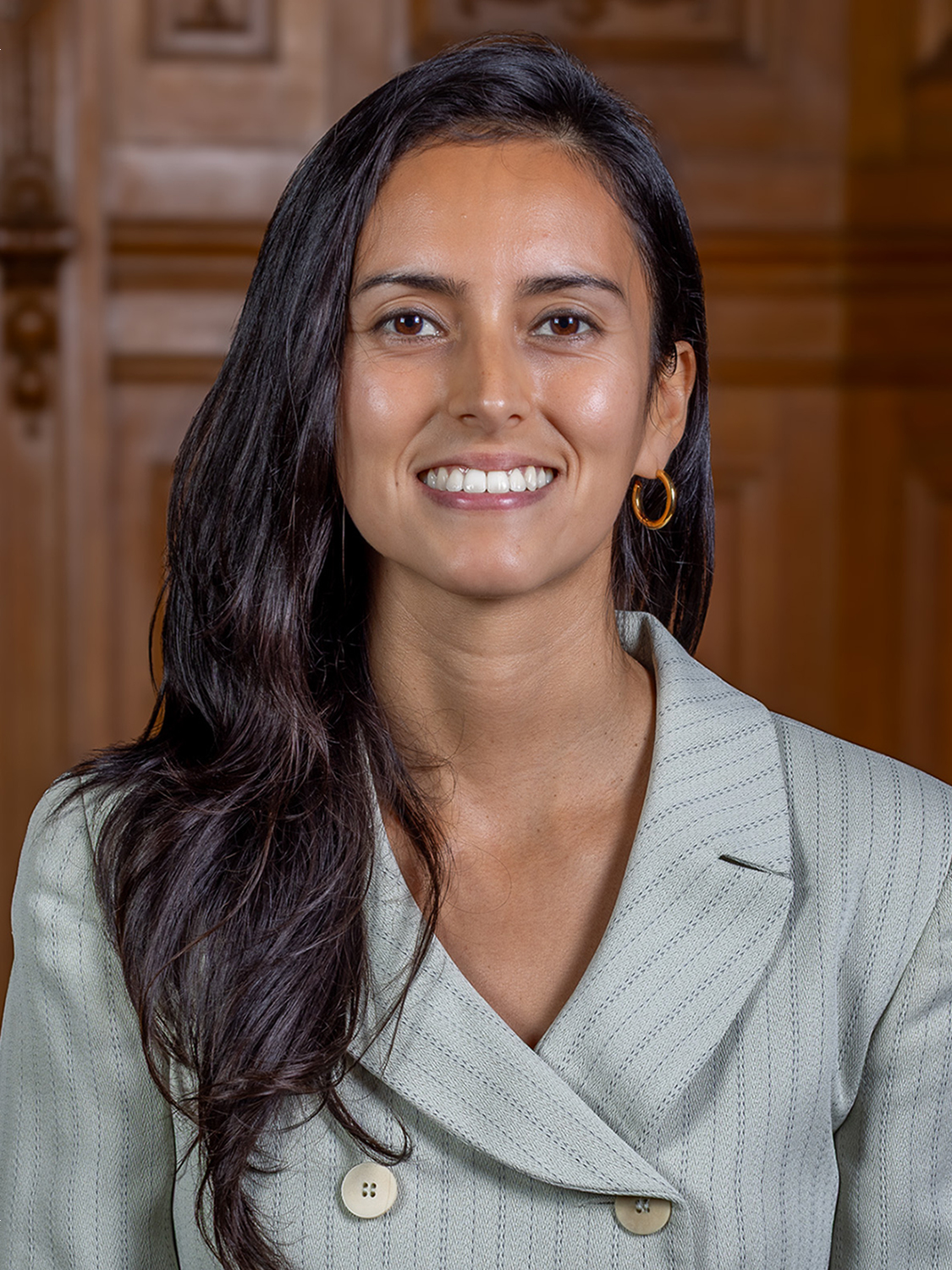
- Official portrait, 2025

Member of the San Francisco Board of Supervisors from the 9th district
- Incumbent
- Assumed office January 8, 2025
- Preceded by: Hillary Ronen

Personal details
- Born: 1994 (age 31–32) Long Beach, California, U.S.
- Party: Democratic
- Education: Stanford University (BA, MA)

Jacqueline Fielder (born 1994) is an American politician who serves as a member of the San Francisco Board of Supervisors for District 9, which includes the neighborhoods of the Mission District, Bernal Heights, and Portola. As a member of the Mandan, Hidatsa, and Arikara Nation, she is the first Native American member of the board.

== Early life and education ==
Fielder was raised in Long Beach, California, and is of Indigenous and Mexican descent. Her grandfather grew up on the Cheyenne River Indian Reservation and her grandmother on the Fort Berthold Indian Reservation. She was raised by a single mother in a working-class family, attending public schools.

She graduated from Stanford University with a Bachelor of Arts in public policy and a Master of Arts in sociology. She was a lecturer in ethnic studies at San Francisco State University.

== Activism ==
Fielder is a member of the Democratic Socialists of America. Fielder advocated for public banks, supporting California AB 857, which allowed local governments to create their own banks. She co-founded the San Francisco Public Bank Coalition, the first publicly-owned municipal bank in San Francisco. Fielder participated in the Dakota Access Pipeline protests. While at Stanford, Fielder joined the Black Lives Matter protests of 2014. She opposed the San Francisco Police Officers Association's use of force policy and has criticized her political opponents for their support from police associations.

Fielder appeared in the 2018 music video "Girls Like You" by Maroon 5 in recognition of her activism.

== Political career ==
In 2020, Fielder challenged State Senator Scott Wiener for his seat in the 11th district. She advanced to the general election in a top-two primary system along with Wiener, but lost to him in the general election. At the time, some in local politics compared her to Alexandria Ocasio-Cortez.

=== San Francisco Board of Supervisors ===
In 2024, Fielder ran for an open seat in the San Francisco Board of Supervisors in district 9, since Hillary Ronen was termed out. She won, beating more moderate candidate Trevor Chandler, with Fielder earning 59.67% of the votes compared to Chandler's 40.33% after ranked choice voting. Former district 9 supervisor Tom Ammiano administered Fielder's oath of office at her swearing-in ceremony in January 2025.

Fielder chairs the Government Audit and Oversight Committee of the Board of Supervisors.

==== Immigration ====
One of Fielder's first actions as Supervisor was introducing a resolution reaffirming San Francisco's status as a sanctuary city, which received unanimous support from the Board. In June 2025, Fielder addressed a crowd of 9,000 people who were protesting raids by U.S. Immigration and Customs Enforcement in San Francisco and condemned the arrest by local police of people attending the protest.

==== Housing and homelessness ====
Fielder introduced legislation to end the city's policy that limits homeless shelter stays for families to 90 days and has repeatedly called on the mayor's administration to reconsider policies that could evict families from shelters without providing viable alternatives for affordable housing. Fielder endorsed a proposal to allocate $66 million a year to support families experiencing homelessness.

In December 2025, Fielder voted against legislation to upzone 60% of San Francisco to allow for more housing.

==== San Francisco Parks Alliance ====
Fielder has demanded accountability in the wake of the San Francisco Parks Alliance financial scandal. She has called for a comprehensive audit of the Parks Alliance's relationship with the city's Recreation and Parks Department, specifically to scrutinize all financial and in-kind relationships, including restricted funds and special arrangements. Fielder said that she would "do everything in my power so that the leaders of the Parks Alliance are held responsible". Fielder has also asked the city's Budget and Legislative Analyst to audit the Recreation and Parks Department itself to determine what city officials knew about the Alliance's financial mismanagement and when they became aware of it. This audit aims to clarify whether city oversight failed and to identify any systemic weaknesses in the city's partnership with nonprofits. With Supervisor Shamann Walton, Fielder has called for subpoenas to compel testimony from the Parks Alliance's former top leaders, including ex-CEOs Robert Ogilvie and Drew Becher, and board treasurer Rick Hutchinson. These subpoenas are intended to force these individuals to explain, under penalty of perjury, how millions in donor and city funds were misspent and why community groups' funds vanished. Fielder has been vocal in public hearings, highlighting the impact of the scandal on smaller community organizations that relied on the Parks Alliance as a fiscal sponsor. She has pushed for transparency and answers regarding how these groups can recoup their lost funds and continue their work.

==== Self-driving cars ====
In October 2025, a Waymo car in Fielder's district hit and killed KitKat, a cat that ran under the car; in response, Fielder held a rally in support of KitKat and called for the state to pass legislation allowing local governments to ban self-driving cars. Fielder received criticism for her decision to amplify a post on the social media site X, promoting a crypto coin, $KitKat, named after the cat.

== Personal life ==
Fielder is queer. She has been homeless, relying on couch-surfing and sleeping in her car. At the time of registering to run for State Senate in 2019, Fielder did not have a permanent address. In accordance with California state law, Fielder listed a street intersection as her residence on her campaign filing paperwork.

Fielder is a citizen of the Mandan, Hidatsa, and Arikara Nation, also known as the Three Affiliated Tribes, and is the first Native American member of the San Francisco Board of Supervisors.

In March 2026, Fielder checked herself into a hospital and initially said that she planned to resign from the Board of Supervisors, then said she was planning to take a medical leave of absence. A statement from her office said she was "navigating a mental health condition." After learning she could take medical leave without resigning, Fielder took a three-month leave at the recommendation of her doctors before returning to work in late June 2026. Other San Francisco politicians including Jane Kim have said that Fielder's vulnerability inspired them to speak up about their own mental health struggles.

== See also ==
- List of Native American politicians
- Native American women in politics
