= California's 29th district =

California's 29th district may refer to:

- California's 29th congressional district
- California's 29th State Assembly district
- California's 29th State Senate district
