= Ling Ling Chang =

American politician (born 1976)

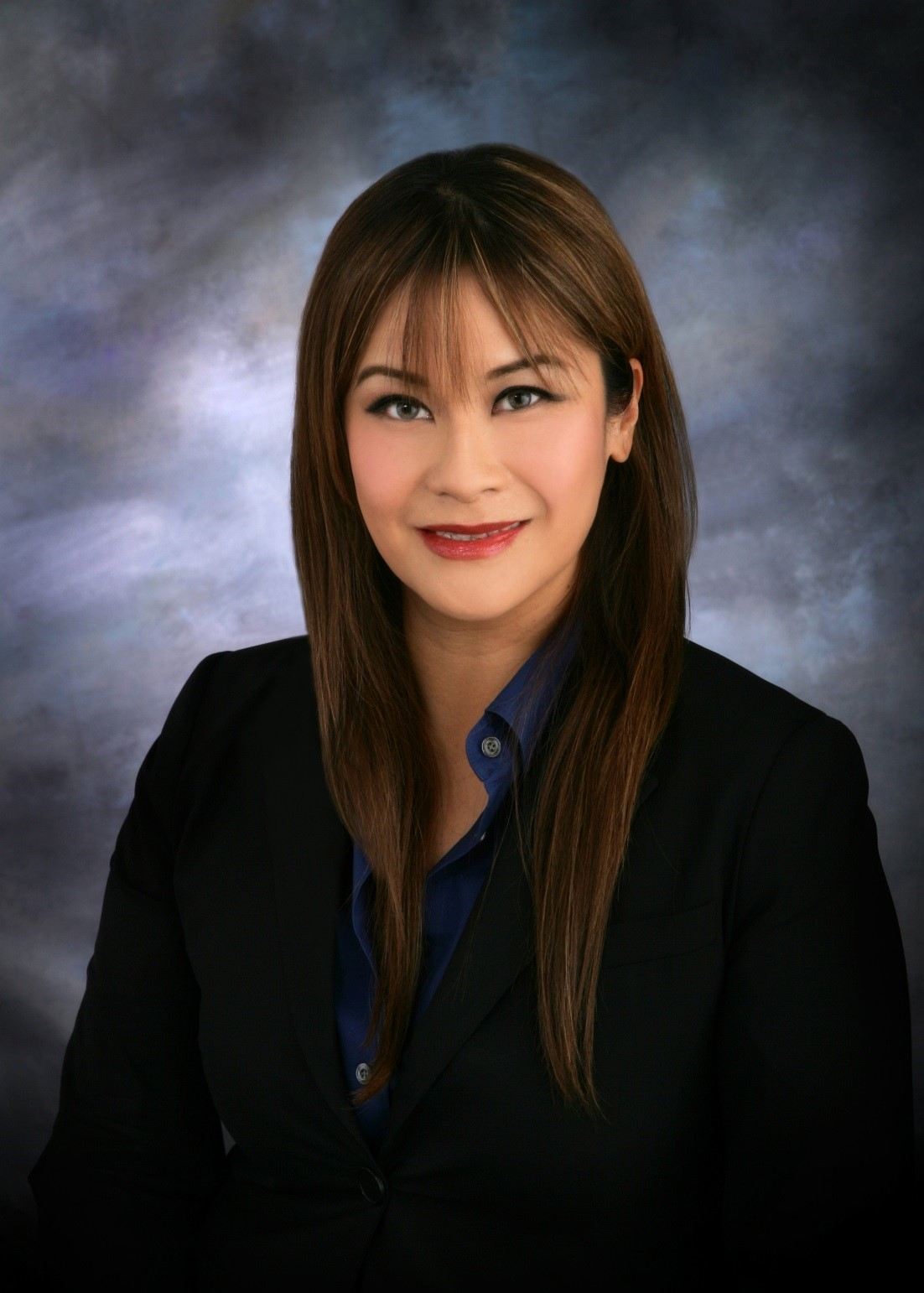
- Chang in 2014

Member of the California State Senate from the 29th district
- In office June 25, 2018 – November 30, 2020
- Preceded by: Josh Newman
- Succeeded by: Josh Newman

Member of the California State Assembly from the 55th district
- In office December 1, 2014 – November 30, 2016
- Preceded by: Curt Hagman
- Succeeded by: Phillip Chen

Personal details
- Born: Chang Ling Ling; July 24, 1976 (age 49) Taipei, Taiwan
- Party: Republican
- Spouse: Andrew Wong
- Education: University of California, Riverside (dropped out)
- Website: https://chang.cssrc.us/

Chinese name
- Traditional Chinese: 張玲齡
- Simplified Chinese: 张玲龄
- Hanyu Pinyin: Zhāng Líng Líng

Ling Ling Chang (born July 24, 1976) is an American politician who formerly served in the California State Senate, representing the 29th district, encompassing parts of Los Angeles, Orange, and San Bernardino counties. Prior to being elected to the state Senate, she was a Diamond Bar City Councilwoman and a state Assemblywoman for the 55th district. Chang is a Republican. She was also the first Taiwanese-born American elected to the state Assembly, and was the only Asian American woman in the California Legislature during her terms in office.

In 2016, Chang was a candidate for California's 29th State Senate district, losing the general election very narrowly to Democrat Josh Newman. After Newman was recalled by voters in 2018, Chang won a plurality of votes on the recall ballot and became the state Senator for California's 29th district. Chang narrowly lost re-election to Josh Newman in the 2020 election.

== Early life and education ==
Born in Taiwan, Chang and her family emigrated to the United States when she was three years old. She was raised in Diamond Bar, California, and graduated from Diamond Bar High School. She studied biology at UC Riverside but did not graduate. She was criticized during her 2014 campaign for claims that she attended Harvard University when she was in fact taking online classes through Harvard Extension School, the university's online extension program which is open to the general public.

== Career ==
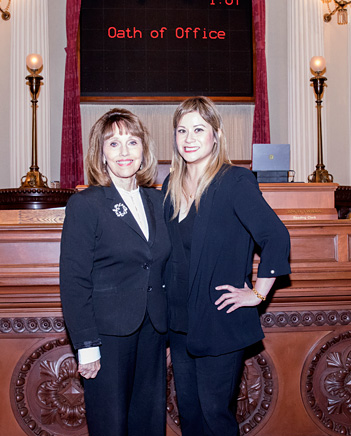
Chang (right) after taking the oath of office in 2018

Chang worked at Strategy Insights Group. In 2005, she was elected to the Walnut Valley Water District Board and was then elected twice to the Diamond Bar City Council.

=== California State Assembly ===
Chang was elected to the California Assembly in the 55th district in 2014 and had five bills signed into law in her first seven months in office. She also proposed bills seeking to cut business regulations.

2014 California State Assembly 55th district election
Primary election
Party	Candidate	Votes	%
Republican	Ling Ling Chang	13,242	28.7
Democratic	Gregg D. Fritchle	12,243	26.5
Republican	Phillip Chen	10,659	23.1
Republican	Steve Tye	9,987	21.6
Total votes		46,131	100.0
General election
Republican	Ling Ling Chang	54,313	63.7
Democratic	Gregg D. Fritchle	30,895	36.3
Total votes		85,208	100.0
Republican hold			

=== 2016 State Senate run ===
Chang was the Republican candidate for California's 29th State Senate district in the 2016 election. She ran against two Democrats, former Irvine Mayor Sukhee Kang and veteran Josh Newman to succeed Bob Huff in 2016 due to term limits.

As of October 2016, Chang had raised more than $4 million. She made public comments distancing herself from Republican presidential nominee Donald Trump. In November 2016, with 49.6% of the vote, Chang lost the general election to Democrat Josh Newman.

2016 California State Senate 29th district election
Primary election
Party	Candidate	Votes	%
Republican	Ling Ling Chang	73,514	44.0
Democratic	Josh Newman	48,754	29.2
Democratic	Sukhee Kang	44,766	26.8
Total votes		167,034	100.0
General election
Democratic	Josh Newman	160,230	50.4
Republican	Ling Ling Chang	157,732	49.6
Total votes		317,962	100.0
Democratic gain from Republican			

=== 2018 State Senate special recall election ===
On June 5, 2018, Chang won a recall election for the same State Senate seat that she had lost to Josh Newman two years earlier. Newman was targeted for recall by the Republican Party of California in an attempt to break the Democratic super majority in the Senate, though the campaign also emphasized Newman's vote to increase gas and vehicle taxes to fund infrastructure improvements.

2018 California's 29th State Senate district special recall election
Choice	Votes	%
For	91,892	58.13
Against	66,197	41.87
Total	158,089	100.00

2018 California's 29th State Senate district special recall election Successor of Josh Newman if a majority vote in favor of recall
Party	Candidate	Votes	%
Republican	Ling Ling Chang	50,215	33.8
Democratic	Joseph Cho	31,726	21.4
Republican	Bruce Whitaker	28,704	19.3
Democratic	Josh Ferguson	17,745	12.0
Democratic	Kevin Carr	12,713	8.6
Republican	George C. Shen	7,442	5.0
Total votes		148,545	100.0
Republican gain from Democratic			

=== 2020 State Senate election ===
In 2020 Chang lost the election to serve a full term in the State Senate. She lost the 2020 rematch to Josh Newman by a margin about three times larger than she had lost in 2016.

2020 California State Senate 29th district election
Primary election
Party	Candidate	Votes	%
Republican	Ling Ling Chang (incumbent)	98,687	47.4
Democratic	Josh Newman	69,732	33.5
Democratic	Joseph Cho	39,643	19.1
Total votes		208,062	100.0
General election
Democratic	Josh Newman	214,456	51.3
Republican	Ling Ling Chang (incumbent)	203,762	48.7
Total votes		418,218	100.0
Democratic gain from Republican			

== Personal life ==
Chang is married to Andrew Wong, an attorney.
