= Josh Newman (politician) =

American politician (born 1964)

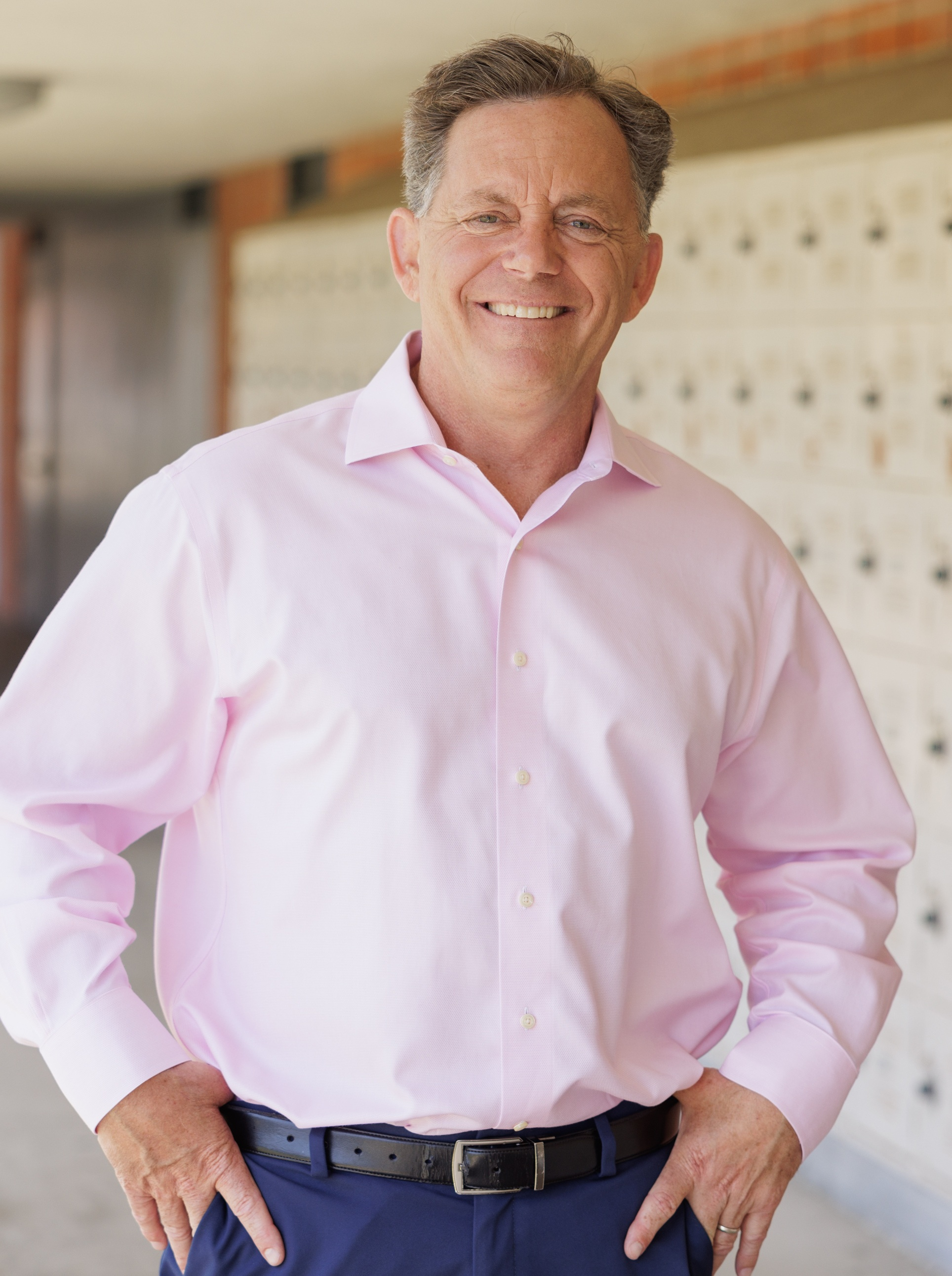
- Newman in 2015

Member of the California State Senate from the 29th district
- In office December 7, 2020 – November 30, 2024
- Preceded by: Ling Ling Chang
- Succeeded by: Eloise Reyes (redistricted)
- In office December 5, 2016 – June 24, 2018
- Preceded by: Bob Huff
- Succeeded by: Ling Ling Chang

Personal details
- Born: October 16, 1964 (age 61)
- Party: Democratic
- Spouse: Darcy Lewis
- Children: 1
- Education: Yale University
- Profession: Educator

Military service
- Allegiance: United States
- Branch/service: United States Army
- Years of service: 1986–1990

Joshua Botts Newman (born October 17, 1964) is an American politician who served in the California State Senate from 2016 to 2018, then again from 2020 to 2024. A Democrat, he represented the 29th Senate District, which encompasses parts of Los Angeles, Orange, and San Bernardino counties.

Newman was elected to the State Senate by a very narrow margin in November 2016, providing Democrats with a two-thirds supermajority of 27 seats. In June 2018, he was successfully recalled by the voters of the 29th Senate District, and replaced by his 2016 opponent, former Republican Assemblywoman Ling Ling Chang. In November 2020, Newman once again defeated Chang to return to the State Senate. In 2024, Newman was defeated for reelection by former Assemblyman Steven Choi in an upset.

Prior to being elected to the State Senate, Newman was a veterans' advocate and executive director of a nonprofit for veterans.

Newman graduated from Yale University and served as an officer in the United States Army.

== Career ==
=== 2016 election ===
In Newman's first election, he defeated former Irvine Mayor Sukhee Kang in the primary, then narrowly defeated Republican state Assemblywoman Ling Ling Chang to succeed term-limited Republican Bob Huff in the general election.

=== 2018 recall ===
In June 2018, Newman was recalled from office, ostensibly for his affirmative vote on Senate Bill 1, which increased gas and diesel taxes and raised DMV registration fees in California. The recall effort was heavily pushed by influential radio personalities John and Ken. He was replaced by Republican Ling Ling Chang, whom he had defeated in the 2016 election.

=== 2020 election ===
On March 4, 2019, Newman announced that he would be a candidate to return to the California State Senate in the 2020 elections.

He came in second in the primary election, defeating Democratic challenger Joseph Cho. In the general election, he won office with 51.3% of the vote to retake the seat from Chang.

=== 2024 election ===
Following redistricting, Newman announced that he would run for the 37th Senate district, going up against fellow Democrat Dave Min. Later, Senator Min announced that he would not seek re-election to the State Senate and would instead run for California's 47th congressional district. In the general election, Min would win the congressional seat, but Newman would end up narrowly losing the Senate seat to Republican former Assemblyman Steven Choi.

=== 2026 Candidacy ===
Newman unsuccessfully attempted to mount an electoral comeback, running for Superintendent of Public Instruction, receiving single digits of the vote and failing to advance to the runoff.

== Personal life ==
Newman is Jewish. He is married and has one child.

== Electoral history ==
=== 2016 ===
2016 California State Senate 29th district election
Primary election
Party	Candidate	Votes	%
Republican	Ling Ling Chang	73,514	44.0
Democratic	Josh Newman	48,754	29.2
Democratic	Sukhee Kang	44,766	26.8
Total votes		167,034	100.0
General election
Democratic	Josh Newman	160,230	50.4
Republican	Ling Ling Chang	157,732	49.6
Total votes		317,962	100.0
Democratic gain from Republican			

=== 2018 (Recall) ===
2018 California State Senate 29th district special recall election
Choice	Votes	%
For	91,892	58.13
Against	66,197	41.87
Total	158,089	100.00

=== 2020 ===
2020 California State Senate 29th district election
Primary election
Party	Candidate	Votes	%
Republican	Ling Ling Chang (incumbent)	98,687	47.4
Democratic	Josh Newman	69,732	33.5
Democratic	Joseph Cho	39,643	19.1
Total votes		208,062	100.0
General election
Democratic	Josh Newman	214,456	51.3
Republican	Ling Ling Chang (incumbent)	203,762	48.7
Total votes		418,218	100.0
Democratic gain from Republican			

=== 2024 ===
2024 California State Senate 37th district election
Primary election
Party	Candidate	Votes	%
Democratic	Josh Newman (incumbent)	67,109	30.1
Republican	Steven Choi	48,364	21.7
Republican	Crystal Miles	31,132	14.0
Republican	Guy Selleck	22,546	10.1
Democratic	Alex Mohajer	18,550	8.3
Republican	Anthony C. Kuo	15,739	7.1
Democratic	Leticia Correa	6,000	2.7
Democratic	Stephanie Le	4,532	2.0
Democratic	Gabrielle Ashbaugh	4,396	2.0
Democratic	Jenny Suarez	3,191	1.4
Democratic	Jacob Niles Creer	1,606	0.7
Total votes		223,165	100.0
General election
Republican	Steven Choi	232,345	50.7
Democratic	Josh Newman (incumbent)	226,270	49.3
Total votes		458,615	100.0
Republican gain from Democratic			
