= List of special elections to the California State Senate =

Special elections to the California State Senate are called by the Governor of California when a vacancy arises within the State Senate. Special elections are conducted in two rounds. The first round is an open primary. The second round is cancelled if one of the candidates receives more than 50% of the vote in the first round. Prior to 2012, the top vote getter from each party in the first round would advance to the second round. Since the passage of Proposition 14 in 2010 (which became effective 2012), the top two vote getters in the first round, regardless of party, advance to the second round.

Recall elections, the process by which voters petition for the removal of an elected official, are also included.

== List of special elections ==
The dates listed indicate the time of the final election, either a runoff election or the open primary round if no second round was held.

District	Date	Predecessor	Winner
33	October 3, 1961	James McBride (D)	Robert Lagomarsino (R)
31	February 13, 1962	John Hollister (R)	Alvin Weingand (D)
5	March 16, 1965	Edwin Regan (D)	Fred W. Marler Jr. (R)
9	August 15, 1967	J. Eugene McAteer (D)	Milton Marks (R) (Note: Switched his party affiliation to the Democratic Party eighteen years after the special election, serving his last eleven years in the State Senate as a Democrat)
7	March 25, 1969	George Miller Jr. (D)	John Nejedly (R)
34	August 18, 1970	John Schmitz (R)	Dennis Carpenter (R)
27	July 20, 1971	George Danielson (D)	David Roberti (D)
36	June 6, 1972	Gordon Cologne (R)	W. Craig Biddle (R)
22	February 27, 1973	Tom Carrell (D)	Alan Robbins (D)
38	March 6, 1973	Clair Burgener (R)	John Stull (R)
20	January 15, 1974	William Coombs (R)	Ruben Ayala (D)
24	July 2, 1974	Robert Lagomarsino (R)	Omer Rains (D)
29	April 1, 1975	Mervyn Dymally (D)	Bill Greene (D)
6	June 8, 1976	George Moscone (D)	John Francis Foran (D)
22	March 8, 1977	Anthony Beilenson (D)	Alan Sieroty (D)
31	April 17, 1979	George Deukmejian (R)	Ollie Speraw (R)
14	June 9, 1979	George N. Zenovich (D)	Kenneth Maddy (R)
12	June 5, 1980	Jerry Smith (D)	Dan O'Keefe (R)
35	April 13, 1982	John Briggs (R)	John Seymour (R)
33	May 12, 1987	Paul B. Carpenter (D)	Cecil Green (D)
39	December 5, 1989	Lawrence W. Stirling (R)	Lucy Killea (D)
31	April 10, 1990	William Campbell (R)	Frank Hill (R)
26	April 10, 1990	Joseph B. Montoya (D)	Charles Calderon (D)
5	January 8, 1991	John Garamendi (D)	Patrick Johnston (D)
1	May 14, 1991	John Doolittle (R)	Tim Leslie (R)
35	May 14, 1991	John Seymour (R)	John Lewis (R)
20	June 2, 1992	Alan Robbins (D)	David Roberti (D)
32	March 2, 1993	Ed Royce (R)	Rob Hurtt (R)
2	April 27, 1993	Barry Keene (D)	Mike Thompson (D)
16	April 27, 1993	Don Rogers (R)	Phil Wyman (R)
4	November 2, 1993	Mike Thompson (D)	Maurice Johannessen (R)
11	November 2, 1993	Becky Morgan (R)	Tom Campbell (R)
40	December 28, 1993	Wadie P. Deddeh (D)	Steve Peace (D)
29	November 8, 1994	Frank Hill (R)	Dick Mountjoy (R)
35	May 9, 1995	Marian Bergeson (R)	Ross Johnson (R)
11	March 26, 1996	Tom Campbell (R)	Byron Sher (D)
9	September 1, 1998	Barbara Lee (D)	Don Perata (D)
32	March 7, 2000	Joe Baca (D)	Nell Soto (D)
24	March 6, 2001	Hilda Solis (D)	Gloria Romero (D)
35	June 6, 2006	John Campbell (R)	Tom Harman (R)
26	May 19, 2009	Mark Ridley-Thomas (D)	Curren Price (D)
37	June 8, 2010	John Benoit (R)	Bill Emmerson (R)
15	August 17, 2010	Abel Maldonado (R)	Sam Blakeslee (R)
1	January 4, 2011	Dave Cox (R)	Ted Gaines (R)
17	February 15, 2011	George Runner (R)	Sharon Runner (R)
28	February 15, 2011	Jenny Oropeza (D)	Ted Lieu (D)
4	January 8, 2013	Doug LaMalfa (R)	Jim Nielsen (R)
40	March 2, 2013	Juan Vargas (D)	Ben Hueso (D)
32	May 14, 2013	Gloria Negrete McLeod (D)	Norma Torres (D)
16	July 23, 2013	Michael Rubio (D)	Andy Vidak (R)
26	September 17, 2013	Curren Price (D)	Holly Mitchell (D)
23	March 25, 2014	Bill Emmerson (R)	Mike Morrell (R)
35	December 9, 2014	Rod Wright (D)	Isadore Hall, III (D)
21	March 17, 2015	Steve Knight (R)	Sharon Runner (R)
37	March 17, 2015	Mimi Walters (R)	John Moorlach (R)
7	May 19, 2015	Mark DeSaulnier (D)	Steve Glazer (D)
32	August 7, 2018	Tony Mendoza (D)	Vanessa Delgado (D)
1	June 4, 2019	Ted Gaines (R)	Brian Dahle (R)
33	June 4, 2019	Ricardo Lara (D)	Lena Gonzalez (D)
28	May 12, 2020	Jeff Stone (R)	Melissa Melendez (R)
30	March 2, 2021	Holly Mitchell (D)	Sydney Kamlager (D)
36	February 25, 2025	Janet Nguyen (R)	Tony Strickland (R)
11	TBD, 2027	Scott Wiener (D)	TBD

=== List of recall elections ===
A replacement state senator is only listed in cases in which the recall was successful.

District	Date	Recall target	Replacement
20	April 12, 1994	David Roberti (D)	Not applicable, recall failed
12	June 3, 2008	Jeff Denham (R)	Not applicable, recall failed
29	June 5, 2018	Josh Newman (D)	Ling Ling Chang (R)

== Results ==
=== 2006 35th State Senate district special election ===

California's 35th State Senate district special election, 2006
Party	Candidate	Votes	%
Republican	Tom Harman	89,408	67.61
Democratic	Larry Caballero	42,838	32.39
Valid ballots		132,246	90.66
Invalid or blank votes		13,629	9.34
Total votes		145,875	100.00
Turnout			28.18
Republican hold			

=== 2008 12th State Senate district recall election ===

California's 12th State Senate district recall election, 2008
Vote on recall		Votes	Percentage
No		61,309	75.36%
Yes		20,043	24.64%
Valid votes		81,352	95.11%
Invalid or blank votes		4,183	4.89%
Totals		85,535	100.00%
Voter turnout		28.44%	
Party	Candidate	Votes	Percentage
Democratic	Simon Salinas	30,946	100.00%
Valid votes		30,946	36.18%
Invalid or blank votes		54,589	63.82%
Totals		85,535	100.00%
Voter turnout		28.44%	
Republican hold			

=== 2009 26th State Senate district special election ===

California's 26th State Senate district special election, 2009
Party	Candidate	Votes	%
Democratic	Curren Price	37,677	70.72
Republican	Nachum Shifren	11,097	20.83
Peace and Freedom	Cindy Henderson	4,501	8.45
Valid ballots		53,275	83.24
Invalid or blank votes		10,726	16.76
Total votes		64,001	100.00
Turnout			18.59
Democratic hold			

=== 2010 37th State Senate district special election ===

California's 37th State Senate district special election, 2010
Party	Candidate	Votes	%
Republican	Bill Emmerson	81,655	59.66
Democratic	Justin Blake	41,243	30.13
American Independent	Matt Monica	13,965	10.20
Total votes		136,863	100.00
Turnout			29.18
Republican hold			

=== 2010 15th State Senate district special election ===

California's 15th State Senate district special election, 2010
Party	Candidate	Votes	%
Republican	Sam Blakeslee	86,873	48.47
Democratic	John Laird	79,835	44.54
Independent	Jim Fitzgerald	8,937	4.99
Libertarian	Mark Hinkle	3,592	2.00
Total votes		179,237	100.00
Turnout			39.43
Republican hold			

=== 2011 17th district special election ===

California's 17th State Senate district special election, 2011 Vacancy resulting from the resignation of George Runner
Party	Candidate	Votes	%
Republican	Sharon Runner	44,238	65.3
Democratic	Darren W. Parker	23,534	34.7
Total votes		67,772	100.0

=== 2011 28th district special election ===

California's 28th State Senate district special election, 2011 Vacancy resulting from the death of Jenny Oropeza
Party	Candidate	Votes	%
Democratic	Ted Lieu	31,723	56.7
Republican	Bob Valentine	14,141	25.3
Republican	Martha Flores Gibson	3,885	6.9
No party preference	Mark Lipman	1,912	3.4
Democratic	Kevin Thomas McGurk	1,416	2.5
Republican	James P. Thompson	1,301	2.3
Republican	Jeffrey E. Fortini	1,246	2.2
No party preference	Michael Chamness	309	0.6
Total votes		55,933	100.0

=== 2013 4th district special election ===

California's 4th State Senate district special election, 2013 Vacancy resulting from the resignation of Doug LaMalfa
Primary election
Party	Candidate	Votes	%
Republican	Jim Nielsen	188,207	49.8
Democratic	Michael "Mickey" Harrington	104,572	27.7
Republican	Dan Logue	43,303	11.5
No party preference	Jann Reed	24,966	6.6
No party preference	Dan Levine	9,882	2.6
No party preference	Benjamin "Ben" Emery	7,146	1.9
Total votes		378,076	100.0
General election
Republican	Jim Nielsen	97,849	66.6
Democratic	Michael "Mickey" Harrington	49,004	33.4
Total votes		146,853	100.0
Republican hold			

=== 2013 40th district special election ===

California's 40th State Senate district special election, 2013 Vacancy resulting from the resignation of Juan Vargas
Primary election
Party	Candidate	Votes	%
Democratic	Ben Hueso	29,367	53.1
Republican	Hector Raul Gastelum	11,951	21.6
Republican	Xanthi Gionis	8,243	14.9
Democratic	Anna Nevenic	5,740	10.4
Democratic	Craig Fiegener (write-in)	39	0.1
Democratic	Rafael Estrada (write-in)	20	0.0
Total votes		55,360	100.0
Democratic hold			

=== 2013 32nd district special election ===

California's 32nd State Senate district special election, 2013 Vacancy resulting from the resignation of Gloria Negrete McLeod
Primary election
Party	Candidate	Votes	%
Democratic	Norma Torres	15,021	44.0
Republican	Paul S. Leon	8,961	26.4
Democratic	Larry Walker	4,620	13.6
Democratic	Joanne T. Gilbert	2,327	6.9
Republican	Kenny Coble	2,178	6.4
Democratic	Paul Vincent Avila	845	2.5
Total votes		33,952	100.0
General election
Democratic	Norma Torres	21,251	59.6
Republican	Paul S. Leon	14,432	40.4
Total votes		35,683	100.0
Democratic hold			

=== 2013 16th district special election ===

California's 16th State Senate district special election, 2013 Vacancy resulting from the resignation of Michael Rubio
Primary election
Party	Candidate	Votes	%
Republican	Andy Vidak	31,610	49.8
Democratic	Leticia Perez	27,854	43.9
Democratic	Francisco "Frank" Ramirez	1,890	3.0
Democratic	Paulina Miranda	1,623	2.6
Peace and Freedom	Mohammed "O" Arif	471	0.7
Total votes		63,448	100.0
General election
Republican	Andy Vidak	42,224	51.9
Democratic	Leticia Perez	39,140	48.1
Total votes		81,364	100.0
Republican gain from Democratic			

=== 2013 26th district special election ===

California's 26th State Senate district special election, 2013 Vacancy resulting from the resignation of Curren Price
Primary election
Party	Candidate	Votes	%
Democratic	Holly Mitchell	19,481	81.0
Democratic	Mervin Evans	4,579	19.0
Total votes		24,060	100.0
Democratic hold			

=== 2014 23rd district special election ===

California's 23rd State Senate district special election, 2014 Vacancy resulting from the resignation of Bill Emmerson
Primary election
Party	Candidate	Votes	%
Republican	Mike Morrell	43,447	62.6
Democratic	Ronald J. O'Donnell	10,531	15.2
Democratic	Ameenah Fuller	6,705	9.7
Libertarian	Jeff Hewitt	4,479	6.5
Republican	Crystal Ruiz	4,187	6.0
Total votes		69,349	100.0
Republican hold			

=== 2014 35th district special election ===

2014 California's 35th State Senate district special election Vacancy resulting from the resignation of Rod Wright
Primary election
Party	Candidate	Votes	%
Democratic	Isadore Hall, III	17,951	55.9
Republican	James Spencer	8,014	25.0
Democratic	Louis L. Dominguez	4,067	12.7
Democratic	Hector Serrano	2,069	6.4
Total votes		32,101	100.0
Democratic hold			

=== 2015 7th district special election ===

2015 California's 7th State Senate district special election Vacancy resulting from the resignation of Mark DeSaulnier
Primary election
Party	Candidate	Votes	%
Democratic	Steve Glazer	38,411	33.7
Democratic	Susan Bonilla	28,389	24.9
Democratic	Joan Buchanan	25,534	22.4
Republican	Michaela M. Hertle (withdrawn)	18,281	16.1
Democratic	Terry Kremin	3,242	2.8
Total votes		113,857	100.0
General election
Democratic	Steve Glazer	68,996	54.5
Democratic	Susan Bonilla	57,491	45.5
Total votes		126,487	100.0
Democratic hold			

=== 2015 21st district special election ===

2015 California's 21st State Senate district special election Vacancy resulting from the resignation of Steve Knight
Primary election
Party	Candidate	Votes	%
Republican	Sharon Runner	26,360	94.1
Democratic	Steve Hill (write-in)	996	3.6
Democratic	Joshua Conaway (write-in)	252	0.9
Republican	Jerry J. Laws (write-in)	120	0.4
No party preference	Joshua C. Chandler (write-in)	108	0.4
Democratic	Richard E. Macias (write-in)	91	0.3
No party preference	Jason Zink (write-in)	90	0.3
Total votes		28,017	100.0
Republican hold			

=== 2015 37th district special election ===

2015 California's 37th State Senate district special election Vacancy resulting from the resignation of Mimi Walters
Primary election
Party	Candidate	Votes	%
Republican	John Moorlach	38,125	50.3
Republican	Don Wagner	33,411	44.0
Republican	Naz Namazi	2,621	3.5
Democratic	Louise Stewardson (write-in)	1,696	2.2
Total votes		75,853	100.0
Republican hold			

=== 2018 29th district special recall election ===

2018 California's 29th State Senate district special recall election
Choice	Votes	%
For	91,892	58.13
Against	66,197	41.87
Total	158,089	100.00

2018 California's 29th State Senate district special recall election Successor of Josh Newman if a majority vote in favor of recall
Party	Candidate	Votes	%
Republican	Ling Ling Chang	50,215	33.80
Democratic	Joseph Cho	31,726	21.36
Republican	Bruce Whitaker	28,704	19.32
Democratic	Josh Ferguson	17,745	11.95
Democratic	Kevin Carr	12,713	8.56
Republican	George C. Shen	7,442	5.01
Total votes		148,545	100.0
Republican gain from Democratic			

=== 2018 32nd district special election ===

The first round of the special election was consolidated with the regularly scheduled primary election. Although most of the candidates in the two contests were the same, the results were very different. Rita Topalian finished first in both races, but different candidates finished in second place. Vanessa Delgado finished in 2nd place in the special election, but 3rd place in the regularly scheduled primary election. She received a similar number of votes in both races, but candidate Bob Archuleta received about 54% more votes in the regularly scheduled election than he did in the special election. The different results have been attributed to the different order in which the candidates were listed on the ballot.

2018 California's 32nd State Senate district special election Vacancy resulting from the resignation of Tony Mendoza
Primary election
Party	Candidate	Votes	%
Republican	Rita Topalian	29,135	25.0
Democratic	Vanessa Delgado	18,898	16.2
Democratic	Tony Mendoza	16,779	14.4
Democratic	Bob Archuleta	13,593	11.7
Republican	Ion Sarega	10,720	9.2
Democratic	Vicky Santana	7,960	6.8
Democratic	Ali S. Taj	6,961	6.0
Democratic	Vivian Romero	5,379	4.6
Democratic	Rudy Bermudez	5,117	4.4
Democratic	John Paul Drayer	1,294	1.1
Democratic	Darren Joseph Gendron	599	0.5
Total votes		116,435	100.0
General election
Democratic	Vanessa Delgado	26,635	52.4
Republican	Rita Topalian	24,240	47.6
Total votes		50,875	100.0
Democratic hold			

=== 2019 1st district special election ===

2019 California's 1st State Senate district special election Vacancy resulting from the resignation of Ted Gaines
Primary election
Party	Candidate	Votes	%
Republican	Brian Dahle	57,725	29.6
Republican	Kevin Kiley	54,290	27.9
Democratic	Silke Pflueger	49,164	25.2
Republican	Rex Hime	18,050	9.3
Democratic	Steve Baird	10,855	5.6
Republican	Theodore Dziuba	4,672	2.4
Total votes		194,756	100.0
General election
Republican	Brian Dahle	84,503	53.9
Republican	Kevin Kiley	72,169	46.1
Total votes		156,672	100.0
Republican hold			

=== 2019 33rd district special election ===

2019 California's 33rd State Senate district special election Vacancy resulting from the resignation of Ricardo Lara
Primary election
Party	Candidate	Votes	%
Democratic	Lena Gonzalez	10,984	31.6
Republican	Jack M. Guerrero	4,860	14.0
Democratic	Ali Saleh	3,334	9.6
Democratic	Ana Maria Quintana	3,038	8.8
Democratic	José Luis Solache	2,594	7.5
Democratic	Denise Diaz	2,404	6.9
Republican	Martha Flores Gibson	2,225	6.4
Democratic	Leticia Vasquez Wilson	1,839	5.3
Democratic	Al Austin, II	1,356	3.9
Democratic	Thomas Jefferson Cares	824	2.4
Democratic	Chris Garcia	720	2.1
Green	Cesar Flores	529	1.5
Total votes		34,711	100.0
General election
Democratic	Lena Gonzalez	32,394	69.8
Republican	Jack M. Guerrero	14,049	30.2
Total votes		46,443	100.0
Democratic hold			

=== 2020 28th district special election ===

2020 California's 28th State Senate district special election Vacancy resulting from the resignation of Jeff Stone
Primary election
Party	Candidate	Votes	%
Republican	Melissa Melendez	81,918	40.5
Democratic	Elizabeth Romero	47,516	23.5
Democratic	Joy Silver	42,222	20.9
Republican	John Schwab	24,536	12.1
Democratic	Anna Nevenic	5,912	2.9
Total votes		202,104	100.0
General election
Republican	Melissa Melendez	105,525	55.4
Democratic	Elizabeth Romero	84,902	45.6
Total votes		190,427	100.0
Republican hold			

=== 2021 30th district special election ===
District 30
- March 2, 2021
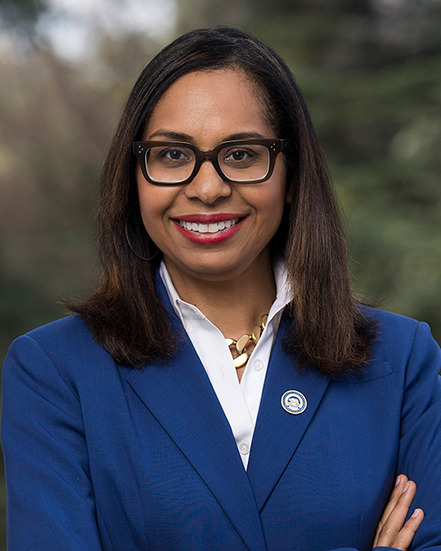

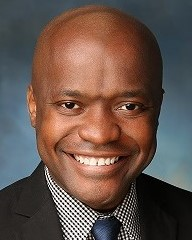
Nominee	Sydney Kamlager	Daniel Lee
Party	Democratic	Democratic
Popular vote	48,483	9,458
Percentage	68.7%	13.4%
Senator before election
Holly Mitchell
Democratic
Elected Senator
Sydney Kamlager
Democratic

2021 California's 30th State Senate district special election Vacancy resulting from the resignation of Holly Mitchell
Primary election
Party	Candidate	Votes	%
Democratic	Sydney Kamlager	48,483	68.7
Democratic	Daniel Lee	9,458	13.4
Republican	Joe Lisuzzo	4,412	6.3
Democratic	Cheryl C. Turner	3,799	5.4
Republican	Tiffani Jones	1,604	2.3
Peace and Freedom	Ernesto Alexander Huerta	1,570	2.2
No party preference	Renita Duncan	1,244	1.8
Total votes		70,577	100.0
Democratic hold			

=== 2025 36th district special election ===
District 36
- February 25, 2025
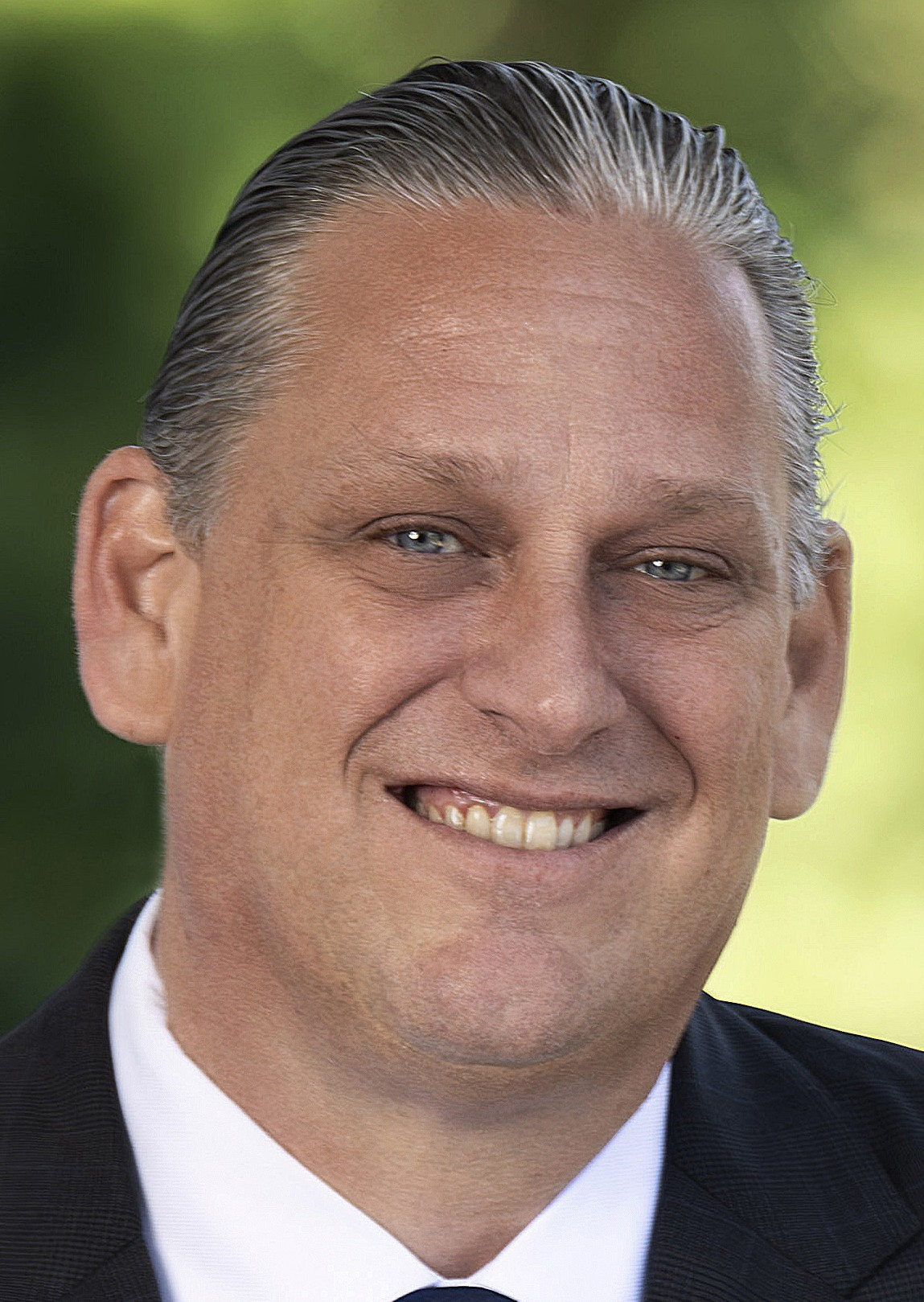
Nominee	Tony Strickland	Jimmy D. Pham
Party	Republican	Democratic
Popular vote	81,133	43,730
Percentage	51.3%	27.7%
Senator before election
Janet Nguyen
Republican
Elected Senator
Tony Strickland
Republican

Incumbent Republican Janet Nguyen resigned after winning a seat for the Orange County Board of Supervisors. A special election was held on February 25, 2025 to fill the vacancy.

2025 California's 36th State Senate district special election Vacancy resulting from the resignation of Janet Nguyen
Primary election
Party	Candidate	Votes	%
Republican	Tony Strickland	81,133	51.3%
Democratic	Jimmy D. Pham	43,730	27.7%
Democratic	Julie Diep	22,647	14.3%
Republican	John Briscoe	10,588	6.7%
Total votes		158,098	100.0%
