= California's 29th senatorial district =

American legislative district

California's 29th State Senate district
Current senator
Eloise Reyes; D–Grand Terrace
- Population (2010) • Voting age • Citizen voting age: 925,494; 695,503; 532,640
- Demographics: 31.73% White; 2.74% Black; 36.61% Latino; 27.39% Asian; 0.41% Native American; 0.34% Hawaiian/Pacific Islander; 0.24% other; 0.54% remainder of multiracial
- Registered voters: 525,519
- Registration: 38.67% Democratic; 31.08% Republican; 25.38% No party preference

California's 29th senatorial district is one of 40 California State Senate districts. It is currently represented by Democrat Eloise Reyes of Grand Terrace.

== District profile ==
The district is located in the Inland Empire in San Bernardino County. The district includes the cities of San Bernardino, Fontana, and Rialto, along with parts of Colton, Highland, Rancho Cucamonga, Redlands, and Upland.

== Election results from statewide races ==
Year	Office	Results
2020	President	Biden 55.1 – 42.9%
2018	Governor	Newsom 51.2 – 48.8%
2018	Senator	Feinstein 55.5 – 45.5%
2016	President	Clinton 53.5 – 40.8%
2016	Senator	Harris 52.1 – 47.9%
2014	Governor	Kashkari 53.9 – 46.1%
2012	President	Romney 49.1 – 48.7%
2012	Senator	Feinstein 50.9 – 49.1%
2010	Governor	Whitman 53.5 – 41.0%
2010	Senator	Fiorina 55.3 – 39.4%
2008	President	John McCain 49.1 – 48.9%
2006	Governor	Schwarzenegger 66.3 – 29.2%
2006	Senator	Mountjoy 48.8 – 46.6%
2004	President	Bush 57.0 – 41.8%
2004	Senator	Jones 48.6 – 46.9%
2003	Recall	Yes 70.2 – 29.8%
2003	Recall	Schwarzenegger 61.9 – 19.2%
2002	Governor	Simon 56.1 – 36.2%
2000	President	Gore 50.2 – 45.9%
2000	Senator	Feinstein 52.1 – 40.7%
1998	Governor	Davis 52.1 – 45.4%
1998	Senator	Fong 50.7 – 45.8%
1996	President	Clinton 45.1 – 44.5%
1994	Governor	Wilson 62.4 – 34.0%
1994	Senator	Huffington 54.2 – 37.3%
1992	President	Bush 41.4 – 37.2%
1992	Senator	Herschensohn 56.1 – 36.5%
1992	Senator	Seymour 46.7 – 44.5%

== List of senators representing the district ==
Due to redistricting, the 29th district has been moved around different parts of the state. The current iteration resulted from the 2021 redistricting by the California Citizens Redistricting Commission.

Senators	Party	Years served	Electoral history	Counties represented
Charles F. Foster (Red Bluff)	Democratic	January 8, 1883 – January 3, 1887	Elected in 1882. [data missing]	Colusa, Tehama
Benjamin F. Langford (Lodi)	Democratic	January 3, 1887 – January 2, 1893	Redistricted from the 16th district and re-elected in 1886. Re-elected in 1890. Redistricted to the 15th district.	San Joaquin
Bart Burke (Santa Cruz)	Democratic	January 2, 1893 – January 4, 1897	Elected in 1892. [data missing]	San Mateo, Santa Cruz
D. H. Trout (Santa Cruz)	Republican	January 4, 1897 – January 1, 1901	Elected in 1896. [data missing]	San Mateo, Santa Cruz
James D. Byrnes (San Mateo)	Republican	January 1, 1901 – May 10, 1903	Elected in 1900. Died.	San Mateo, Santa Cruz
Vacant		May 10, 1903 – January 2, 1905		San Mateo, Santa Cruz
Samuel H. Rambo (Boulder Creek)	Republican	January 2, 1905 – January 4, 1909	Elected in 1904. [data missing]	San Mateo, Santa Cruz
James B. Holohan (Watsonville)	Democratic	January 4, 1909 – January 6, 1913	Elected in 1908. Retired to run for U.S. House of Representatives.	San Mateo, Santa Cruz
Henry H. Lyon (Los Angeles)	Republican	January 6, 1913 – December 1, 1917	Elected in 1912. Re-elected in 1916. Assassinated.	Los Angeles
Vacant		December 1, 1917 – January 6, 1919		Los Angeles
Dwight H. Hart (Los Angeles)	Independent	January 6, 1919 – January 5, 1925	Elected in 1918. Re-elected in 1922. [data missing]	Los Angeles
Dwight H. Hart (Los Angeles)	Republican	January 6, 1919 – January 5, 1925	Elected in 1918. Re-elected in 1922. [data missing]	Los Angeles
Joseph L. Pedrotti (Los Angeles)	Republican	January 5, 1925 – January 2, 1933	Elected in 1924. Re-elected in 1928. [data missing]	Los Angeles
Chris N. Jespersen (Atascadero)	Republican	January 2, 1933 – February 21, 1951	Elected in 1932. Re-elected in 1936. Re-elected in 1940. Re-elected in 1944. Re-elected in 1948. Died.	San Luis Obispo
Vacant		February 21, 1951 – January 5, 1953		San Luis Obispo
Alan A. Erhart (San Luis Obispo)	Republican	January 5, 1953 – August 13, 1960	Elected in 1952. Re-elected in 1956. Died.	San Luis Obispo
Vacant		August 13, 1960 – January 2, 1961		San Luis Obispo
Vernon L. Sturgeon (Paso Robles)	Republican	January 2, 1961 – January 2, 1967	Elected in 1960. Re-elected in 1964. Retired to become the Legislative Secretary for Ronald Reagan.	San Luis Obispo
Mervyn Dymally (Los Angeles)	Democratic	January 2, 1967 – January 6, 1975	Elected in 1966. Re-elected in 1970. Re-elected in 1972. Retired to become the Lieutenant Governor of California.	Los Angeles
Vacant		January 6, 1975 – April 7, 1975		Los Angeles
Bill Greene (Los Angeles)	Democratic	April 7, 1975 – November 30, 1984	Elected to finish Dymally's term. Re-elected in 1976. Re-elected in 1980. Redistricted to the 27th district.	Los Angeles
Robert G. Beverly (Manhattan Beach)	Republican	December 3, 1984 – November 30, 1992	Redistricted from the 27th district and re-elected in 1984. Re-elected in 1988. Redistricted to the 27th district.	Los Angeles
Frank Hill (Whittier)	Republican	December 7, 1992 – July 8, 1994	Redistricted from the 31st district and re-elected in 1992. Convicted of corruption and resigned.	Los Angeles, Orange
Vacant		July 8, 1994 – December 5, 1994		Los Angeles, Orange
Dick Mountjoy (Monrovia)	Republican	December 5, 1994 – November 30, 2000	Elected to finish Hill's term. Re-elected in 1996. [data missing]	Los Angeles
Bob Margett (Arcadia)	Republican	December 4, 2000 – November 30, 2008	Elected in 2000. Re-elected in 2004. Retired due to term limits.	Los Angeles
Bob Huff (San Dimas)	Republican	December 1, 2008 – November 30, 2016	Elected in 2008. Re-elected in 2012. Retired due to term limits.	Los Angeles, Orange, San Bernardino
Josh Newman (Fullerton)	Democratic	December 5, 2016 – June 24, 2018	Elected in 2016. Recalled from office.	Los Angeles, Orange, San Bernardino
Ling Ling Chang (Diamond Bar)	Republican	June 25, 2018 – November 30, 2020	Elected to finish Newman's term. Lost re-election.	Los Angeles, Orange, San Bernardino
Josh Newman (Fullerton)	Democratic	December 7, 2020 – November 30, 2024	Elected in 2020. Redistricted to the 37th district and lost re-election.	Los Angeles, Orange, San Bernardino
Eloise Reyes (Grand Terrace)	Democratic	December 2, 2024 – present	Elected in 2024.	San Bernardino

== Election results (1990-present) ==
2024 California State Senate 29th district election
Primary election
Party	Candidate	Votes	%
Democratic	Eloise Reyes	44,977	45.0
Republican	Carlos A. Garcia	31,947	32.0
Republican	Kathleen Torres Hazelton	12,996	13.0
Democratic	Jason O'Brien	10,045	10.0
Total votes		99,965	100.0
General election
Democratic	Eloise Reyes	160,820	57.0
Republican	Carlos A. Garcia	121,085	43.0
Total votes		281,905	100.0
Democratic hold			

=== 2020 ===
2020 California State Senate 29th district election
Primary election
Party	Candidate	Votes	%
Republican	Ling Ling Chang (incumbent)	98,687	47.4
Democratic	Josh Newman	69,732	33.5
Democratic	Joseph Cho	39,643	19.1
Total votes		208,062	100.0
General election
Democratic	Josh Newman	214,456	51.3
Republican	Ling Ling Chang (incumbent)	203,762	48.7
Total votes		418,218	100.0
Democratic gain from Republican			

=== 2018 (recall) ===
2018 California State Senate 29th district special recall election
Choice	Votes	%
For	91,892	58.13
Against	66,197	41.87
Total	158,089	100.00

2018 California State Senate 29th district special recall election Successor of Josh Newman if a majority vote in favor of recall
Party	Candidate	Votes	%
Republican	Ling Ling Chang	50,215	33.8
Democratic	Joseph Cho	31,726	21.4
Republican	Bruce Whitaker	28,704	19.3
Democratic	Josh Ferguson	17,745	11.9
Democratic	Kevin Carr	12,713	8.6
Republican	George C. Shen	7,442	5.0
Total votes		148,545	100.0
Republican gain from Democratic			

=== 2016 ===
2016 California State Senate 29th district election
Primary election
Party	Candidate	Votes	%
Republican	Ling Ling Chang	73,514	44.0
Democratic	Josh Newman	48,754	29.2
Democratic	Sukhee Kang	44,766	26.8
Total votes		167,034	100.0
General election
Democratic	Josh Newman	160,230	50.4
Republican	Ling Ling Chang	157,732	49.6
Total votes		317,962	100.0
Democratic gain from Republican			

=== 2012 ===
2012 California State Senate 29th district election
Primary election
Party	Candidate	Votes	%
Republican	Bob Huff (incumbent)	68,708	64.3
Democratic	Greg Diamond	38,169	35.7
Total votes		106,877	100.0
General election
Republican	Bob Huff (incumbent)	160,912	55.1
Democratic	Greg Diamond	131,228	44.9
Total votes		292,140	100.0
Republican hold			

=== 2008 ===
2008 California State Senate 29th district election
Party	Candidate	Votes	%
Republican	Bob Huff	178,155	54.4
Democratic	Joseph Lyons	127,536	38.9
Libertarian	Jill Stone	21,983	6.7
Total votes		327,674	100.0
Republican hold			

=== 2004 ===
2004 California State Senate 29th district election
Party	Candidate	Votes	%
Republican	Bob Margett (incumbent)	190,165	61.7
Democratic	Rufino Bautista, Jr.	101,350	32.8
Libertarian	Dan Fernandes	17,044	5.5
Total votes		308,559	100.0
Republican hold			

=== 2000 ===
2000 California State Senate 29th district election
Party	Candidate	Votes	%
Republican	Bob Margett	128,713	49.1
Democratic	Richard Melendez	125,975	48.0
Libertarian	Leland Faegre	7,655	2.9
Total votes		262,343	100.0
Republican hold			

=== 1996 ===
1996 California State Senate 29th district election
Party	Candidate	Votes	%
Republican	Dick Mountjoy (incumbent)	138,944	58.9
Democratic	Tommy Randle	96,829	41.1
Total votes		235,773	100.0
Republican hold			

=== 1994 (special) ===
1994 California State Senate 29th district special election Vacancy resulting from the resignation of Frank Hill
Party	Candidate	Votes	%
Republican	Dick Mountjoy	116,562	60.1
Democratic	Sandra K. Hester	64,007	33.0
Libertarian	Matt Piazza	8,756	4.5
Green	Walt Contreras Sheasby	4,614	2.4
Total votes		193,939	100.0
Republican hold			

=== 1992 ===
1992 California State Senate 29th district election
Party	Candidate	Votes	%
Republican	Frank Hill (incumbent)	148,754	56.2
Democratic	Sandy Hester	116,021	43.8
Total votes		264,775	100.0
Republican hold			

== See also ==
- California State Senate
- California State Senate districts
- Districts in California
