= California's 11th senatorial district =

American legislative district

California's 11th State Senate district
Current senator
Scott Wiener; D–San Francisco
- Population (2020) • Voting age • Citizen voting age: 1,022,311; 883,572; 757,682
- Demographics: 35.37% White; 4.77% Black; 16.79% Latino; 36.73% Asian; 0.17% Native American; 0.43% Hawaiian/Pacific Islander; 0.75% other; 4.99% remainder of multiracial
- Registered voters: 568,370
- Registration: 59.86% Democratic; 6.99% Republican; 28.93% No party preference

California's 11th senatorial district is one of 40 California State Senate districts. It is currently represented by Democrat Scott Wiener of San Francisco.

== District profile ==
The district encompasses San Francisco and northern San Mateo County, including Daly City, Broadmoor, Colma, and parts of South San Francisco and San Bruno.

== Election results from statewide races ==
Year	Office	Results
2021	Recall	No 85.5 – 14.5%
2020	President	Biden 84.4 – 13.7%
2018	Governor	Newsom 85.7 – 14.3%
2018	Senator	Feinstein 64.4– 35.6%
2016	President	Clinton 85.0 – 10.0%
2016	Senator	Harris 77.0 – 23.0%
2014	Governor	Brown 87.7 – 12.3%
2012	President	Obama 83.1 – 13.6%
2012	Senator	Feinstein 88.2 – 11.8%

== List of senators representing the district ==
Due to redistricting, the 11th district has been moved around different parts of the state. The current iteration resulted from the 2021 redistricting by the California Citizens Redistricting Commission.

Senators	Party	Years served	Counties represented	Notes
Edward Keating	Democratic	January 8, 1883 – January 5, 1885	San Francisco	Keating and Nelson served together.
Thorwald Klaudius Nelson	Democratic	January 8, 1883 – January 5, 1885	San Francisco	Keating and Nelson served together.
Daniel J. Creighton	Democratic	January 5, 1885 – January 3, 1887	San Francisco	Creighton and Drum served together.
Edward F. Drum	Democratic	January 5, 1885 – January 3, 1887	San Francisco	Creighton and Drum served together.
James McCudden	Democratic	January 3, 1887 – January 7, 1889	Solano	
George Jerome Campbell	Republican	January 7, 1889 – January 2, 1893	Solano	
Elliott McAllister	Democratic	January 2, 1893 – January 4, 1897	Contra Costa, Marin	
John Henry Dickinson	Republican	January 4, 1897 – January 1, 1901	Contra Costa, Marin	
Charles Mortimer Belshaw	Republican	January 1, 1901 – January 2, 1905	Contra Costa, Marin	
August E. Muenter	Republican	January 2, 1905 – January 4, 1909	San Joaquin	
John Thomas Lewis	Republican	January 4, 1909 – January 6, 1913	San Joaquin	
William R. Flint	Republican	January 6, 1913 – January 8, 1917	San Benito, San Mateo, Santa Cruz	
M. B. Johnson	Republican	January 8, 1917 – January 7, 1929	San Benito, San Mateo, Santa Cruz	
George C. Cleveland	Republican	January 7, 1929 – January 2, 1933	San Benito, San Mateo, Santa Cruz	
Frank L. Gordon	Republican	January 2, 1933 – January 3, 1949	Napa, Yolo	
Nathan F. Coombs	Republican	January 3, 1949 – January 2, 1961	Napa, Yolo	
Samuel R. Geddes	Democratic	January 2, 1961 – March 5, 1965	Napa, Yolo	Died in office from a heart attack.
Vacant		March 5, 1965 – January 2, 1967	Napa, Yolo	
Nicholas C. Petris	Democratic	January 2, 1967 – November 30, 1976	Alameda	
Al Alquist	Democratic	December 6, 1976 – November 30, 1984	Alameda, San Benito, Santa Cruz	
Becky Morgan	Republican	December 3, 1984 – August 17, 1993	San Mateo, Santa Clara	Resigned from the Senate to become President/CEO of Joint Venture:Silicon Valley Network.
Vacant		August 17, 1993 – November 11, 1993	San Mateo, Santa Clara	
Tom Campbell	Republican	November 11, 1993 – December 12, 1995	San Mateo, Santa Clara	Sworn in after winning special election. Resigned from office to be sworn in the 15th Congressional district after winning special election.
Vacant		December 12, 1995 – March 28, 1996	San Mateo, Santa Clara	
Byron Sher	Democratic	March 28, 1996 – November 30, 2004	San Mateo, Santa Clara	Sworn in after winning special election.
Joe Simitian	Democratic	December 6, 2004 – November 30, 2012	San Mateo, Santa Clara, Santa Cruz	
Mark Leno	Democratic	December 3, 2012 – November 30, 2016	San Francisco, San Mateo	
Scott Wiener	Democratic	December 5, 2016 – present	San Francisco, San Mateo	

== Election results (1990-present) ==
=== 2024 ===
2024 California State Senate 11th district election
Primary election
Party	Candidate	Votes	%
Democratic	Scott Wiener (incumbent)	166,610	73.0
Republican	Yvette Corkrean	34,447	15.1
Democratic	Cynthia Cravens	18,519	8.1
No party preference	Jing Chao Xiong	8,717	3.8
Total votes		228,293	100.0
General election
Democratic	Scott Wiener (incumbent)	325,148	77.8
Republican	Yvette Corkrean	92,715	22.2
Total votes		417,863	100.0
Democratic hold			

=== 2020 ===
2020 California State Senate 11th district election
Primary election
Party	Candidate	Votes	%
Democratic	Scott Wiener (incumbent)	167,124	55.7
Democratic	Jackie Fielder	99,566	33.2
Republican	Erin Smith	33,321	11.1
Total votes		300,011	100.0
General election
Democratic	Scott Wiener (incumbent)	254,635	57.1
Democratic	Jackie Fielder	191,065	42.9
Total votes		445,700	100.0
Democratic hold			

=== 2016 ===
2016 California State Senate 11th district election
Primary election
Party	Candidate	Votes	%
Democratic	Jane Kim	118,582	45.3
Democratic	Scott Wiener	117,913	45.1
Republican	Ken Loo	25,189	9.6
Democratic	Michael A. Petrelis (write-in)	4	0.0
Total votes		261,684	100.0
General election
Democratic	Scott Wiener	209,462	51.0
Democratic	Jane Kim	201,316	49.0
Total votes		410,778	100.0
Democratic hold			

=== 2012 ===
2012 California State Senate 11th district election
Primary election
Party	Candidate	Votes	%
Democratic	Mark Leno (incumbent)	118,023	82.0
Republican	Harmeet Dhillon	25,828	18.0
Total votes		143,851	100.0
General election
Democratic	Mark Leno (incumbent)	303,241	84.7
Republican	Harmeet Dhillon	54,887	15.3
Total votes		358,128	100.0
Democratic hold			

=== 2008 ===
2008 California State Senate 11th district election
Party	Candidate	Votes	%
Democratic	Joe Simitian (incumbent)	272,154	74.8
Republican	Blair Nathan	91,592	25.2
Total votes		363,746	100.0
Democratic hold			

=== 2004 ===
2004 California State Senate 11th district election
Party	Candidate	Votes	%
Democratic	Joe Simitian	230,484	66.5
Republican	Jon Zellhoefer	101,887	29.4
Libertarian	Allen M. Rice	14,080	4.1
Total votes		346,451	100.0
Democratic hold			

=== 2000 ===
2000 California State Senate 11th district election
Party	Candidate	Votes	%
Democratic	Byron Sher (incumbent)	183,887	59.3
Republican	Gloria S. Hom	113,770	36.7
Libertarian	John J. "Jack" Hickey	12,676	4.1
Total votes		310,333	100.0
Democratic hold			

=== 1996 ===
1996 California State Senate 11th district election
Party	Candidate	Votes	%
Democratic	Byron Sher (incumbent)	177,155	57.9
Republican	Patrick Shannon	117,547	38.4
Libertarian	Jon W. Malonia	11,290	3.7
Total votes		305,992	100.0
Democratic hold			

=== 1996 (special) ===
1996 California State Senate 11th district special election Vacancy resulting from the resignation of Tom Campbell
Party	Candidate	Votes	%
Democratic	Byron Sher	104,208	55.4
Republican	Patrick Shannon	83,741	44.6
Total votes		136,949	100.0
Democratic gain from Republican			

=== 1993 (special) ===
1993 California State Senate 11th district special election Vacancy resulting from the resignation of Becky Morgan
Party	Candidate	Votes	%
Republican	Tom Campbell	100,804	60.2
Democratic	Hal Plotkin	18,095	10.8
Democratic	Amal B. Winter	15,244	9.1
Republican	Virgil McVicker	11,251	6.7
Democratic	Phil Stokes	8,086	4.8
Libertarian	John Peterson	5,424	3.2
Independent	Nancy Jewll Cross	4,322	2.6
Republican	John J. "Jack" Hickey	4,240	2.5
No party	John J. "Jack" Hickey (write-in)	29	0.0
Total votes		163,675	100.0
Republican hold			

=== 1992 ===
1992 California State Senate 11th district election
Party	Candidate	Votes	%
Republican	Becky Morgan (incumbent)	218,855	64.5
Democratic	Frank W. Trinkle	104,162	30.7
Libertarian	Christopher R. Inama	16,300	4.8
Total votes		339,317	100.0
Republican hold			

== See also ==
- California State Senate
- California State Senate districts
- Districts in California
