= Vernon L. Sturgeon =

American politician

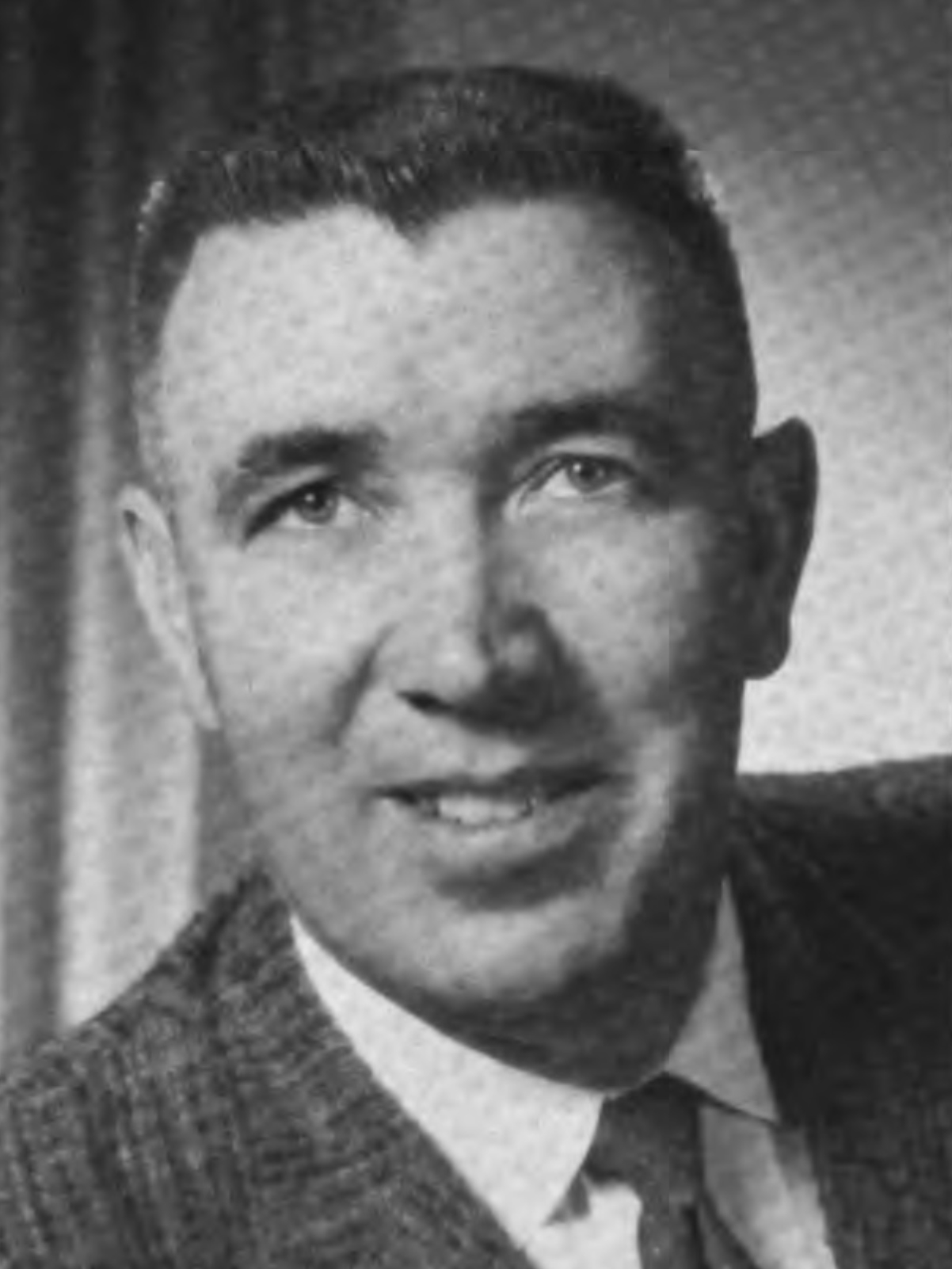
- Sturgeon in 1963

Member of the California State Senate from the 29th district
- In office January 2, 1961 – January 2, 1967
- Preceded by: Alan A. Erhart
- Succeeded by: Mervyn Dymally

Personal details
- Born: October 1, 1915 Chandler, Arizona, U.S.
- Died: November 7, 2004 (aged 89)
- Party: Republican

Vernon L. Sturgeon (October 1, 1915 – November 7, 2004) was an American politician. He served as a Republican member for the 29th district of the California State Senate.

He subsequently served on the California Public Utilities Commission.

Part of California Highway 101 between Spring Street in Paso Robles and Santa Barbara Road in Atascadero was named as the Senator Vernon L. Sturgeon Memorial Highway in 2006.

== Life and career ==
Sturgeon was born in Chandler, Arizona.

In 1960, Sturgeon was elected to represent the 29th district of the California State Senate, succeeding Alan A. Erhart. He served until 1967, when he was succeeded by Mervyn Dymally.

Sturgeon died in November 7, 2004, at the age of 89.
