= Steve Glazer =

American politician

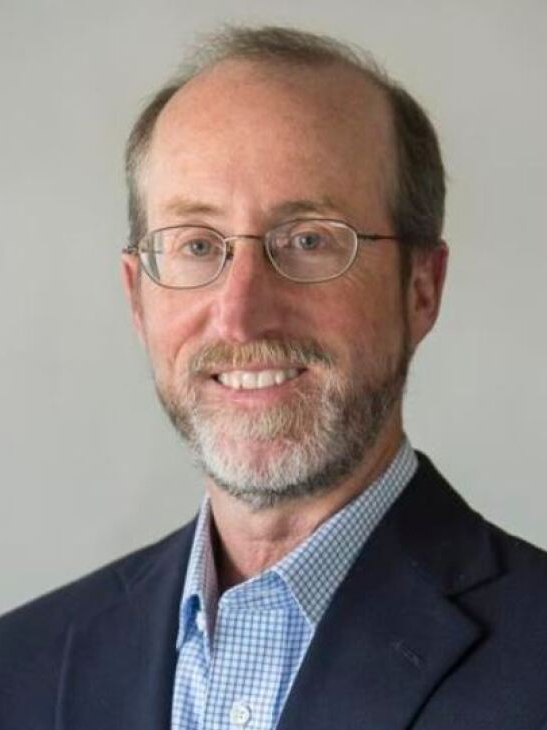
- Official portrait, 2017

Member of the California Senate from the 7th district
- In office May 28, 2015 – November 30, 2024
- Preceded by: Mark DeSaulnier
- Succeeded by: Jesse Arreguín

Personal details
- Born: Steven Mitchell Glazer; August 10, 1957 (age 68) Sacramento, California, U.S.
- Party: Democratic
- Spouse: Melba Muscarolas
- Children: 2
- Education: San Diego State University (BA)

Steven Mitchell Glazer (born August 10, 1957) is an American politician and former political advisor who is a former member of the California State Senate from the 7th Senate District, which includes most of Contra Costa County and eastern portions of Alameda County in the East Bay. Glazer was a 2014 Democratic candidate for District 16 of the California State Assembly Glazer was appointed by Jerry Brown in 2011 to serve as a member of the California State University Board of Trustees until 2015, when he was elected to the State Senate. Glazer was also Brown's lead political strategist. Glazer first worked for Brown in 1978, when he was in charge of the campaign activities at 20 colleges for Brown's re-election as Governor. Glazer served as deputy campaign manager for Brown's unsuccessful bid for the United States Senate in 1982.

== Early life and education ==
Glazer was born in Sacramento, California. He earned his Bachelor of Arts degree from San Diego State University. While attending SDSU, he served as president of Associated Students, the university's student governing group and chair of the California State Student Association.

== Career ==
=== Consulting ===
In 1989, Glazer formed his own public relations, media, and political consulting firm, Glazer & Associates. Glazer was senior advisor to Kathleen Brown in her 1990 campaign for California State Treasurer. Glazer was an advisor to the 1994 campaign of Democratic former Los Angeles City Councilman Michael Woo in his primary race for Secretary of State.

Glazer ran Jerry Brown's campaign for governor in 2010. Glazer aided Governor Brown's campaign to gain voter approval of Proposition 30 in 2012, which prevented billions of dollars in additional cuts to our public schools and universities.

Glazer was spokesperson for the first female Chief Justice of California Supreme Court, Rose Bird, during her failed retention campaign from 1985 to 1986.

Glazer was the press secretary for Assemblyman Gray Davis in 1983 and ran his re-election campaign in 1984. Glazer persuaded Davis to promote the idea of placing the pictures of missing children on milk cartons, grocery bags, bus stops and billboards. That campaign was credited with finding more than one dozen children and won Davis widespread publicity and eventually helped him win his first statewide office on his way to becoming governor.

Glazer served as press secretary for State Senate Pro Tem David Roberti from 1987 to 1993. As press secretary for Roberti, Glazer ran a media campaign to boost legislation that became the Roberti-Roos Assault Weapons Control Act of 1989, a California law that bans the ownership and transfer of over 50 specific brands and models of semi-automatic firearms, which were classified as assault weapons.

=== Ballot measures ===
Glazer ran the campaign for the 1990 Los Angeles ballot measure, Measure H, which instituted ethics reform of Los Angeles city election campaigns.

Glazer served as a political strategist for the historic 1992 Los Angeles City Charter Amendment F, which aimed to dramatically alter the power structure of the Los Angeles Police Department and make it more accountable to the community. This amendment, which was spearheaded by former United States Secretary of State Warren Christopher, implemented several changes, including limiting a police chief to two five-year terms, granting the mayor the authority to select a chief with the City Council's approval, and introducing civilian oversight of officer misconduct through the addition of a civilian member to disciplinary panels.

Glazer led campaigns in the 1990s to protect old growth redwood forests, the San Francisco Bay, parks, and open spaces. Working with The Trust for Public Land, Glazer helped pass measures in more than 25 states that protect clean water and thousands of acres of open space.

Glazer organized campaigns that provided billions of dollars for homeless shelters and affordable housing, as well as residences for abused women and foster children.

Glazer ran the campaign for two bond measures in the March 7, 2000, ballot propositions, Proposition 12 & 13, which California voters approved. They provided a total of $4.1 billion to go to a variety of state, local, and nonprofit agencies to implement a broad range of activities to protect and enhance resources.

In 2002, Glazer managed the successful statewide campaign for Proposition 46, created a trust fund to: provide shelters for battered women; clean and safe housing for low-income senior citizens; emergency shelters for homeless families with children; housing with social services for homeless and mentally ill; repairs/accessibility improvements to apartments for families and handicapped citizens; military veteran home-ownership assistance; and security improvements/repairs to existing emergency shelters.

In 2006, Glazer served as campaign manager for Proposition 1C, which funded new and existing housing and development programs. The programs would be aimed at increasing development in urban areas, transportation, homeless shelters, and construction and renovation of rental housing projects. The measure would also provide funds to low-income home buyers.

Glazer ran Governor Jerry Brown's tax measure campaign in 2012.

Glazer was a coauthor of the 2020 California Proposition 13, a bond measure to fund capital improvements at schools.

=== City of Orinda ===
Glazer served on the Orinda Park and Recreation Commission from 1997 to 1999.

Glazer was elected to the City Council of Orinda in 2004, 2008, and 2012.

Glazer also served as mayor of the City of Orinda. He was elected to that post in 2007, 2012 and 2015.

=== 2014 Candidacy for California State Assembly ===
Glazer was a 2014 Democratic candidate for District 16 of the California State Assembly. His campaign focused on prohibiting strikes by public transit workers; an SFGate article called his campaign "a near single-issue campaign of banning public transit strikes." Glazer came in third in the primary and did not make it to the general election.

=== California Senate ===
Glazer won a May 2015 special election to succeed Mark DeSaulnier, who was elected to Congress in 2014. Glazer defeated fellow Democrat, Assemblywoman Susan Bonilla. Dan Brekke, writing for KQED, described Glazer as "a moderate allied with business interests" and Bonilla as "an Assembly incumbent with strong support from labor."

He won his re-election campaign in November 2016 and began a new four-year term. He was re-elected in November 2020 to begin a new four-year term. His term ended on December 1, 2024.

==== Tenure ====
Glazer authored a bill in 2015 to ban the use of Confederate leaders in state parks, buildings, schools and other public places.

Glazer authored a bill in 2016, the California Promise, to help increase the 4-year graduation rate by requiring the California State University (CSU) system to provide priority enrollment, enhanced academic advising and other support for students who carry at least 30 units per year.

Glazer co-authored (with Sen. Isadore Hall III) SB 880, in 2016, to close a loophole in the assault weapons ban.

In 2017, Glazer was the lone Democrat in the state Senate to vote against a single-payer healthcare system. Also that year, he was the only Democrat in the state Senate to vote against a transportation funding bill, which he said was because he did not support the allocation of funds to the California High-Speed Rail and because he was concerned about measures related to diesel pollution. News outlets reported that he also wanted to include a ban on BART strikes in the legislation. The month after the vote against the transportation bill, Glazer resigned from the Senate Governmental Organization Committee.

Glazer authored a ballot measure, Proposition 72 in 2018, to improve residents’ ability to capture rainwater that passed both houses of the Legislature and made it onto the June 2018 primary ballot. Voters approved the measure in June 2018.

Glazer authored the first-in-the-nation truth-in-lending bill for small businesses in 2018, making lending to small businesses more transparent.

Glazer authored legislation in 2019 to create the office of Inspector General for the Bay Area Rapid Transit Authority to look for waste, fraud and abuse in the agency.

Glazer jointly authored a bill in 2020 to ban the sale of flavored tobacco. "These flavored vaping products are addicting our children to nicotine and endangering their lives," he said. "The explosive use has become an epidemic that requires urgent action. Thank you Senator Hill for your leadership in protecting our children."

In 2021, Glazer proposed legislation that would require oversight of mental healthcare spending in California.

In 2022, Glazer was the lone Democrat in the State Senate to join the Republicans in voting against a bill abolishing slavery in California, though 10 other Democrats abstained from voting on the bill, leaving the bill one vote shy of the 21 needed. The bill, which had unanimously passed the assembly, failed. Glazer, in a statement after the vote, called slavery “evil” but noted the bill was not about slavery, but whether California “should require felons in state prison to work”. Should the banning the work requirement occur, he said it would undermine rehabilitation programs and tie the legislators hands.

Glazer is a member of the California Legislative Jewish Caucus.

==== Committees ====
===== 2015–2016 =====
Glazer served as Chairman of the Senate Banking and Financial Institutions Committee, and as a member of the Insurance and Public Safety committees.

===== 2017–2018 =====
Glazer served as Chairman of the Governmental Organization and Insurance committees; and as Chairman of Senate Select Committee on Student Success; and as a member of the Budget & Fiscal Review, and Human Services committees.

===== 2019–2020 =====
Glazer served as Chairman of the Business, Professions & Economic Development; Chairman of Senate Select Committee on Student Success; and as a member of the Agriculture; Education; Governmental Organization; and Insurance committees.

===== 2021–2022 =====
Glazer is Chairman of the Elections and Constitutional Amendment Committee; and serves on the Agriculture; Education; Governmental Organization; and Insurance committees.

=== 2022 Candidacy for State Controller ===
On March 7, 2022, Glazer announced his candidacy for California State Controller. Glazer came in fourth place in the primary, and therefore did not advance to the general election.

== Personal life ==
Glazer is married to Melba Muscarolas, a retired executive with AT&T, with whom he has two daughters, Ariel and Alex.

In October 2003, Glazer was shot in the neck by a high-powered pellet rifle while driving with his family. The .17-caliber projectile just missed his carotid artery and lodged next to his spine. The perpetrator was caught but never charged with a crime because pellet guns were classified as toys in the criminal code. After recovering from this injury, Glazer worked with then-Senator Tom Torlakson to author legislation establishing penalties for pellet-gun attacks (SB 532, Chapter 180, Statutes of 2006).
