= Joseph Cho =

American politician (born 1943)

Joseph J. Cho
- 조재길
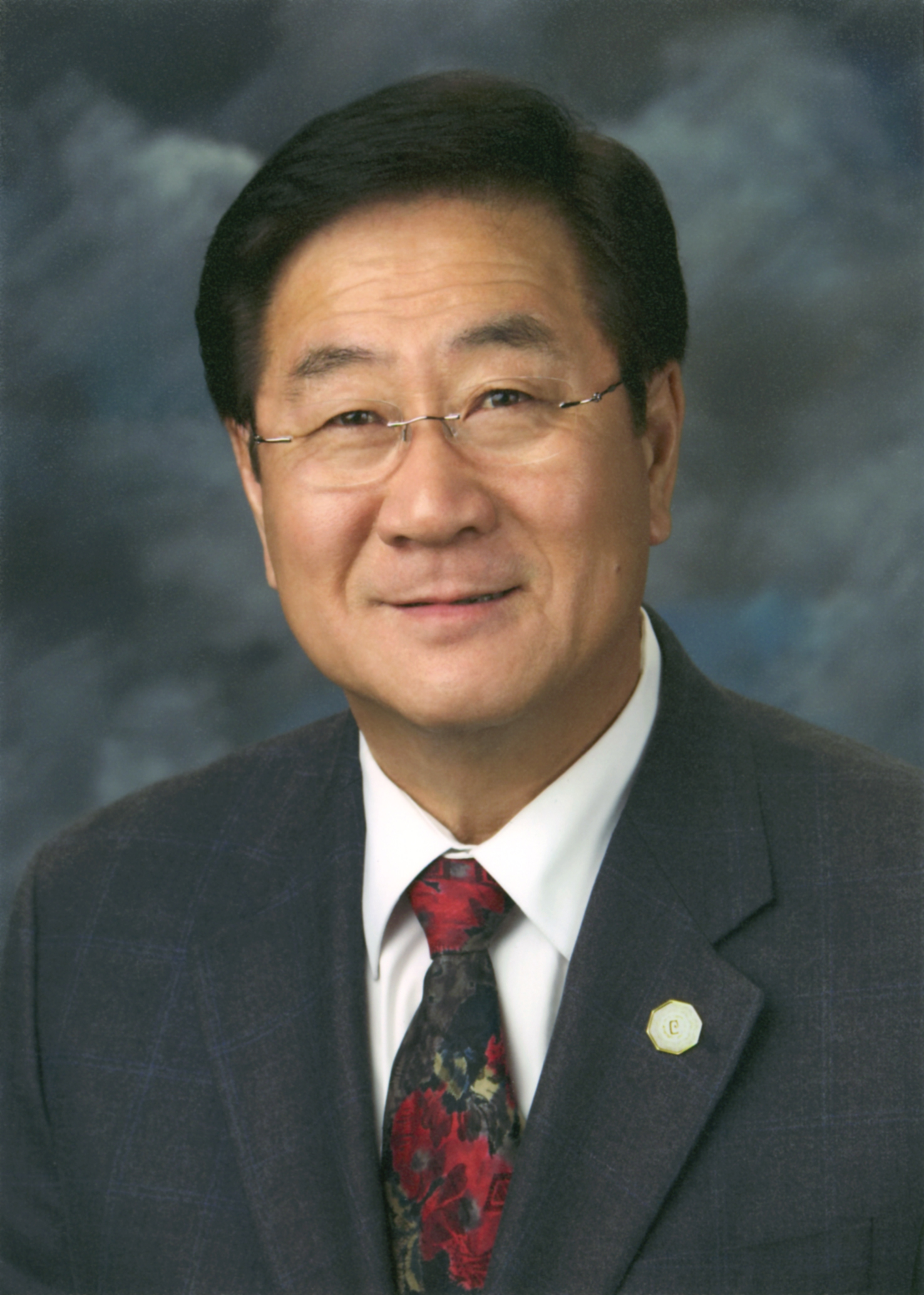

Mayor of Cerritos
- In office 2010–2011
- Preceded by: Jim Edwards
- Succeeded by: Carol K. Chen

Member of the Cerritos City Council
- In office 2007–2015

Personal details
- Born: February 16, 1943 (age 83) Kyushu, Japan
- Party: Democratic
- Spouse: Lucy Cho (1972–present)
- Education: Seoul National University (B.A), Yanbian University (P.H.D)
- Profession: Politician, Small Businessman

- Korean name
- Hangul: 조재길
- RR: Jo Jaegil
- MR: Cho Chaegil

Joseph J. Cho (born February 16, 1943) is an American politician who served eight years as a councilmember and mayor of Cerritos, Los Angeles County, California, and ran twice as a candidate for the California State Senate.

== Early life ==
Jae-gil "Joseph" Cho was born on February 16, 1943, in Kyushu, Japan, the eldest son of Cho Rong-hwan and Jeon Jeon-ae, both Korean laborers. In 1944, his parents returned to his hometown of Danyang County, Chungcheongbuk-do, and registered his birth.

He grew up in Judeok-myeon, Chungju-gun, Chungcheongbuk-do, and Buksang-ri, Danyang-gun, and graduated from Danyang Middle School, Andong Normal School, and Seoul National University. He was commissioned as a major in the Republic of Korea Air Force in 1967, and served as a correspondence officer for the three chiefs of staff, Kim Sung-ryong, Kim Doo-man, and Ok Man-ho, at the Air Force Headquarters, and retired as a lieutenant in 1972.

Before and after his Air Force service, he worked as a teacher for four years at Osan High School in Gyeonggi-do and Boseong High School in Seoul. He and his wife, Sookhye "Lucy" Kwon, whom he married in 1972, moved to the United States in 1974.

== Life and career in the United States ==
Cho settled in Los Angeles, California, on July 5, 1974; he worked as a janitor and gas station attendant. In 1975, he was hired by the Los Angeles County Department of Computing, where he quickly rose from computer operator to a manager-level programmer in three years, a position that would take most Americans more than a decade to reach.

He received several offers from electronics companies, including JPL in Pasadena, but resigned from Los Angeles County in 1978 to pursue a successful real estate business in Cerritos, which became his second home. His real estate articles in various newspapers and magazines at the time led to the concentration of Koreans in Los Angeles County and northern Orange County, and helped to form the Korean American community in northern Orange County today.

== Publisher of Rasung Ilbo ==
Cho, who began publishing the weekly newspaper Rasung Illbo in 1981, immigrated to the United States in the same year and collaborated with Yoon Han-bong, a leader of the Gwangju Uprising who formed the Korean Youth Union, and played a pivotal role in the Korean democracy movement in the United States until the June 1987 uprising opened the way for democratization.

The South Korean military dictatorship under Chun Doo-hwan bankrupted him economically, but he did not give up and led the 10 million-signature petition for a straight constitution in 1985, the 1986 Korean-American Conscience Declaration Conference, and the June 1987 Korean-American National Declaration for a Democratic Constitution in New York and Los Angeles in collaboration with Reverend Kyung-Seok Seo.

In June 1989, he won a two-and-a-half-year court battle in the Los Angeles District Court against the Korean military dictator and his henchmen, but the aftershocks of his victory are still felt today. The Korean Street Journal, which served as the voice of the Korean democracy movement, was unable to adapt to the new environment of numerous newspapers and broadcasts in Korea after the June 29 Declaration and disappeared into history after publishing its 10th-anniversary issue in February 1991.

== Contributing towards the Korean reunification ==
During a trip to North Korea to cover the 1990 Pan-National Congress, Korean journalists from around the world elected Cho Jae-gil as the chairman of the preparatory committee for the founding of the Pan-National Journalists' Association, which he hoped would serve as a “lever for national reconciliation and reunification across the dividing line,” but he was short-lived due to various restrictions.

Prior to the 1992 parliamentary elections, he was offered the nomination of the Democratic Party (Kim Young-sam) and the People's Party (Kim Dae-jung), as well as his cousins and brothers-in-law, who assisted President Roh Tae-woo in his entourage as protocol secretary and entourage secretary, but he abandoned his dream of returning permanently to the United States in light of South Korea's unwillingness to accept his book, Is North Korea Changing (Samminsa), which he published in South Korea after visiting North Korea.

He has been active in the Korean pro-democracy and anti-nuclear peace movements since 1992, starting as the chairman of the preparatory committee for the 12th anniversary of the May 18 Uprising in Gwangju, and has published seven books on nuclear issues and peace on the Korean Peninsula. The USC University Library in Los Angeles recognized the historical value of the Korean Street Journal, Rasung Ilbo, and Tongilmadang, which Cho published in Los Angeles in the 1980s and 90s, and preserved them in original and microfilm, and is currently in the process of computerizing them. Since the 1980s, Cho has donated his collection of materials to the Gwangju May 18 Memorial Foundation.

== Political career in the United States ==
In 1997, after the election of President Kim Dae-jung, he left the Korean democracy movement where he had been active for 20 years, and moved his printing house to Compton. He expanded the business with his own efforts for three years before closing the company in 2001 and continuing to develop and invest in real estate, earning a doctorate in history from Yanbian University in China when he was over 60.

When no one else stepped forward to represent the Korean community, which had become the largest ethnic minority community in Cerritos due to the rapidly growing Korean population, Cho ran for city council to encourage Korean voter registration. After two unsuccessful attempts, he became the first Korean-American to be elected to the Cerritos City Council in his third attempt, then served as mayor in 2010 and was re-elected in 2011.

During his tenure, he appointed many Korean American commissioners and worked to elect and empower Korean American city council members and school board members in Los Angeles and Orange counties. He retired from the Cerritos City Council in 2015 after receiving a citation from the President of the Republic of Korea for his efforts to support Korean War veterans' visits to South Korea, hosting a Korean Navy cruise training exercise, adopting a resolution to ratify the U.S.-Korea Free Trade Agreement, and promoting exchanges and cooperation with Korean local governments.

== Life post-politics ==
After participating in the 2017 candlelight revolution in South Korea as a Radio Korea columnist, Cho founded the U.S.-Korea Peace Institute with Dr. Alon Baribe. While writing the English edition of Beyond the Korean Peninsula, he thought, “How many Americans will read this book? If I am elected to the state senate, I can play a bigger role.” He ran for state senator twice.

In July 2021, after four years, the English and Korean versions of Beyond the Korean Peninsula Nuclear Crisis were published in Korea, and in November, the English version was sent to U.S. President Joe Biden, South Korean President Moon Jae-in, North Korean leader Kim Jong-un, and all members of the U.S. Senate and House of Representatives, and in 2022, the Chinese and Japanese versions were published.

Since January 2022, the U.S.-Korea Institute for Peace has been conducting Zoom meetings with U.S. congressional offices, asking them to support legislation to reduce military tensions on the Korean Peninsula and lift the ban on U.S. citizens traveling to North Korea.

Cho began running marathons at age 67 at his father’s encouragement. According to Cho, his father, who lived to age 93, had long emphasized longevity, remarking, “No man in my family was over 60.” Cho continues to run and has expressed hopes for peace on the Korean Peninsula and around the world.

== Publications ==
- <북한은 변하고 있는가> (삼민사 1990)
- <한반도 핵문제와 통일> (삼민사 1994)
- <통일로 가는 길이 달라진다> (도서출판 오름 1998)
- <북핵위기와 한반도 평화의 길> (한울아카데미 2006)
- <소명: 한인최초의 미 세리토스 시장 조재길 자서전> (도서출판 한울 2010)
- <평화가 먼저다> (도서출판 한울 2013)
- My Calling: Autobiography of Joseph Cho, Ph.D. (KUSPI 2018)
- Beyond the Korean Peninsula Nuclear Crisis (도서출판 문사철 2021)
- <한반도 핵위기를 넘어> (도서출판 문사철 2021)
- <소명 II: 조재길 자서전> (도서출판 문사철 2021)
- 중국어판 <한반도 핵위기를 넘어> (도서출판 문사철 2022)
- 일본어판 <한반도 핵위기를 넘어> (도서출판 문사철 2022)
