= 2022 California State Senate election =

- November 8, 2022

20 seats from even-numbered districts in the California State Senate 21 seats needed for a majority
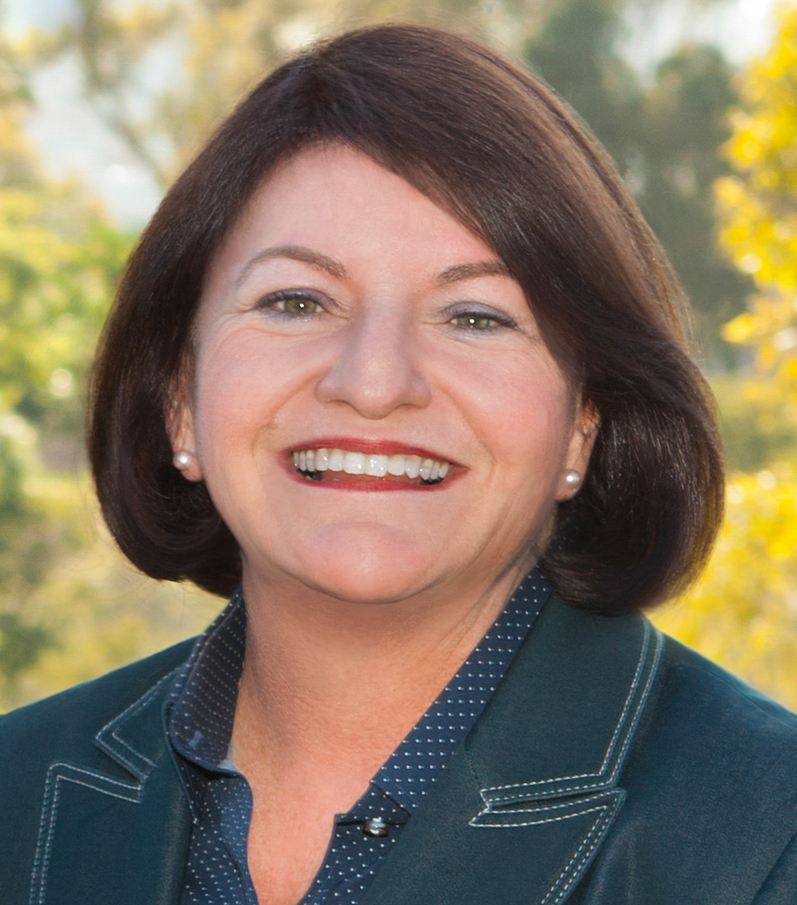

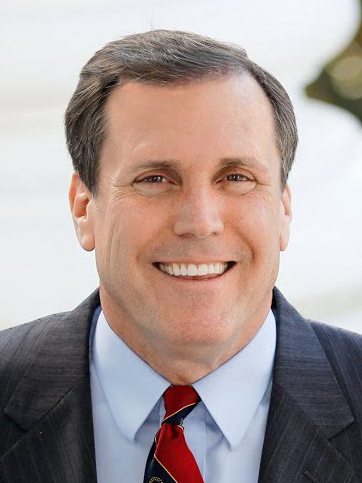
| | Majority party | Minority party |
|---|---|---|
| Leader | Toni Atkins | Scott Wilk |
| Party | Democratic | Republican |
| Leader since | March 21, 2018 | January 20, 2021 |
| Leader's seat | 39th–San Diego | 21st–Santa Clarita |
| Seats before | 31 | 9 |
| Seats after | 32 | 8 |
| Seat change | ▲1 | ▼1 |
| Popular vote | 3,201,860 | 1,825,644 |
| Percentage | 63.69% | 36.31% |
- Democratic hold Democratic gain Republican hold Republican gain No election held Democratic: 50–60% 60–70% 70–80% 80–90% Republican: 50–60% 60–70% No election held
President pro tempore before election
Toni Atkins
Democratic
Elected President pro tempore
Toni Atkins
Democratic

The 2022 California State Senate election was held on Tuesday, November 8, with the primary election having been held on Thursday, June 7. Voters in the 20 even-numbered districts of the California State Senate elected their representatives. The elections coincided with elections for other offices, including the state assembly.

Democrats gained one seat, increasing their supermajority to 32 out of 40 seats, a four-fifths majority.

== Predictions ==
| Source | Ranking | As of |
|---|---|---|
| Sabato's Crystal Ball | Safe D | May 19, 2022 |

== Overview ==
=== Summary by State Senate District ===
† - Incumbent not seeking re-election

| District | Incumbent | Party | Elected Senator | Party |
|---|---|---|---|---|
| 2nd | Mike McGuire | Dem | Mike McGuire | Dem |
| 4th | New Seat | | Marie Alvarado-Gil | Dem |
| 6th | New Seat | | Roger Niello | Rep |
| 8th | Richard Pan† (Note: Redistricted from the 6th district.) | Dem | Angelique Ashby | Dem |
| 10th | Bob Wieckowski† | Dem | Aisha Wahab | Dem |
| 12th | Shannon Grove (Note: Redistricted from the 16th district.) | Rep | Shannon Grove | Rep |
| 12th | Andreas Borgeas† (Note: Redistricted from the 8th district.) | Rep | Shannon Grove | Rep |
| 14th | Anna Caballero (Note: Redistricted from the 12th district.) | Dem | Anna Caballero | Dem |
| 16th | Melissa Hurtado (Note: Redistricted from the 14th district.) | Dem | Melissa Hurtado | Dem |
| 18th | Ben Hueso† (Note: Redistricted from the 40th district.) | Dem | Steve Padilla | Dem |
| 20th | Robert Hertzberg† (Note: Redistricted from the 18th district.) | Dem | Caroline Menjivar | Dem |
| 22nd | Susan Rubio | Dem | Susan Rubio | Dem |
| 22nd | Connie Leyva† (Note: Redistricted from the 20th district.) | Dem | Susan Rubio | Dem |
| 24th | Ben Allen (Note: Redistricted from the 26th district.) | Dem | Ben Allen | Dem |
| 26th | María Elena Durazo (Note: Redistricted from the 24th district.) | Dem | María Elena Durazo | Dem |
| 28th | Sydney Kamlager-Dove† (Note: Redistricted from the 30th district.) | Dem | Lola Smallwood-Cuevas | Dem |
| 30th | Bob Archuleta (Note: Redistricted from the 32nd district.) | Dem | Bob Archuleta | Dem |
| 32nd | Melissa Melendez† (Note: Redistricted from the 28th district.) | Rep | Kelly Seyarto | Rep |
| 34th | Tom Umberg | Dem | Tom Umberg | Dem |
| 36th | New Seat | | Janet Nguyen | Rep |
| 38th | Patricia Bates† (Note: Redistricted from the 36th district.) | Rep | Catherine Blakespear | Dem |
| 40th | Brian Jones (Note: Redistricted from the 38th district.) | Rep | Brian Jones | Rep |

=== Primary elections ===
2022 California State Senate election Primary election
| Party | Votes | Percentage | Candidates | Advancing to general | Seats contesting |
|---|---|---|---|---|---|
| Democratic | 1,857,206 | 60.5 | 38 | 25 | 20 |
| Republican | 1,213,169 | 39.5 | 25 | 15 | 15 |
| Totals | 3,070,375 | 100.00 | 63 | 40 | — |

=== General elections ===
2022 California State Senate election General election – November 8, 2022
| Party | Votes | % | Before | Up | Won | After | +/– |
|---|---|---|---|---|---|---|---|
| Democratic | 3,201,860 | 63.69 | 31 | 14 | 15 | 32 | ▲1 |
| Republican | 1,825,644 | 36.31 | 9 | 6 | 5 | 8 | ▼1 |
| Totals | 5,027,504 | 100.00 | 40 | 20 | 20 | 40 | — |

== Retiring incumbents ==
1. 1st: Jim Nielsen (R–Red Bluff): (Note: Redistricted from the 4th district.) Termed out of office
2. 8th: Richard Pan (D–Sacramento): (Note: Redistricted from the 6th district.) Termed out of office
3. 10th: Bob Wieckowski (D–Fremont): Termed out of office
4. 12th: Andreas Borgeas (R-Fresno): (Note: Redistricted from the 8th district.) Retiring
5. 18th: Ben Hueso (D–San Diego): (Note: Redistricted from the 40th district.) Termed out of office
6. 20th: Robert Hertzberg (D–Van Nuys): (Note: Redistricted from the 18th district.) Termed out of office
7. 22nd: Connie Leyva (D-Chino): (Note: Redistricted from the 20th district.) Running for San Bernardino County Supervisor
8. 28th: Sydney Kamlager-Dove (D-Los Angeles): (Note: Redistricted from the 30th district.) Running for California's 37th congressional district
9. 32nd: Melissa Melendez (R–Lake Elsinore): (Note: Redistricted from the 28th district.) Termed out of office
10. 38th: Patricia Bates (R–Laguna Niguel): (Note: Redistricted from the 36th district.) Termed out of office

== District 2 ==
District 2
- November 8, 2022
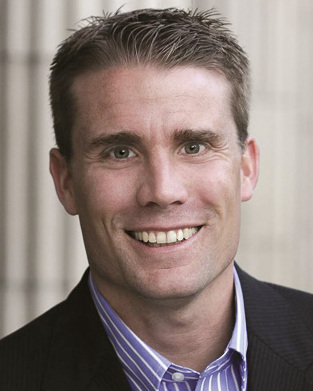

| Nominee | Mike McGuire | Gene Yoon |
| Party | Democratic | Republican |
| Popular vote | 283,689 | 103,333 |
| Percentage | 73.3% | 26.7% |
- County results McGuire: 50–60% 60–70% 70–80% 80–90% Yoon: 50–60%
Senator before election
Mike McGuire
Democratic
Elected Senator
Mike McGuire
Democratic

The 2nd district encompasses most of the North Coast region, stretching from the Oregon border to the northern Bay Area to include Del Norte, Humboldt, Trinity, Mendocino, Sonoma, and Marin Counties. The incumbent was two-term Democrat Mike McGuire of Healdsburg, who ran for a third term.

=== Candidates ===
==== Declared ====
- Mike McGuire (Democratic), incumbent state senator
- Gene Yoon (Republican), lawyer

=== Endorsements ===
Mike McGuire (D)

Organizations

- California Democratic Party
- California Teachers Association
- Equality California
- NARAL Pro-Choice California
- SEIU United Healthcare Workers West
- Sierra Club
Gene Yoon (R)

Organizations

- California Republican Party

=== Results ===
California's 2nd State Senate district, 2022
Primary election
| Party | Candidate | Votes | % |
|---|---|---|---|
| Democratic | Mike McGuire (incumbent) | 197,999 | 75.1 |
| Republican | Gene Yoon | 65,762 | 24.9 |
| Total votes | | 263,761 | 100% |
General election
| Democratic | Mike McGuire (incumbent) | 283,689 | 73.3 |
| Republican | Gene Yoon | 103,333 | 26.7 |
| Total votes | | 387,022 | 100% |
| Democratic hold | | | |

== District 4 ==
District 4
- November 8, 2022
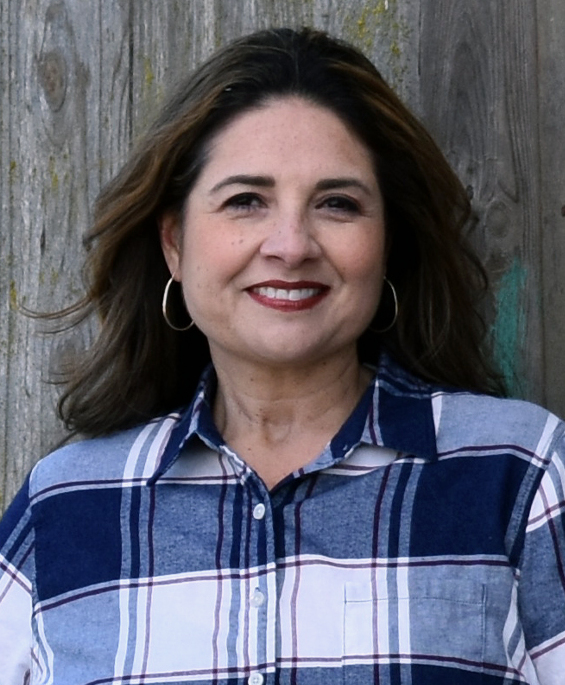

| Nominee | Marie Alvarado-Gil | Tim Robertson |
| Party | Democratic | Democratic |
| Popular vote | 137,157 | 123,210 |
| Percentage | 52.7% | 47.3% |
Senator before election
None (New Seat)
Elected Senator
Marie Alvarado-Gil
Democratic

The new 4th district is located in the northeastern Central Valley, the central Sierra Nevada, and Death Valley, including Stanislaus, Calaveras, Amador, El Dorado, Placer, Alpine, Tuolumne, Mariposa, Madera, Mono, and Inyo counties. The district had no incumbent.

=== Candidates ===
==== Declared ====
- Marie Alvarado-Gil (Democratic), charter school administrator and former vice president of the Amador County Democratic Central Committee
- Steven Bailey (Republican), former El Dorado County Superior Court judge and runner-up for Attorney General of California in 2018
- Jolene Daly (Republican), marriage and family therapist
- Michael Gordon (Republican), president of the Rescue Union School District board of trustees
- Jack Griffith (Republican), retired combat engineer
- Jeff McKay (Republican), Stanislaus Union School Board trustee and former Ceres city councilor
- George Radanovich (Republican), former U.S. representative for California's 19th congressional district (1995–2011)
- Tim Robertson (Democratic), director of North Valley Labor Federation

=== Endorsements ===
Tim Robertson (D)

Organizations

- California Democratic Party
- California Teachers Association
- SEIU United Healthcare Workers West

=== Results ===
California's 4th State Senate district, 2022
Primary election
| Party | Candidate | Votes | % |
|---|---|---|---|
| Democratic | Tim Robertson | 48,880 | 22.1 |
| Democratic | Marie Alvarado-Gil | 41,262 | 18.7 |
| Republican | George Radanovich | 37,793 | 17.1 |
| Republican | Steven Bailey | 37,129 | 16.8 |
| Republican | Jeff McKay | 34,773 | 15.7 |
| Republican | Jack Griffith | 10,337 | 4.7 |
| Republican | Michael Gordon | 6,202 | 2.8 |
| Republican | Jolene Daly | 4,652 | 2.1 |
| Total votes | | 221,028 | 100% |
General election
| Democratic | Marie Alvarado-Gil | 137,157 | 52.7 |
| Democratic | Tim Robertson | 123,210 | 47.3 |
| Total votes | | 260,367 | 100% |
| Democratic win (new seat) | | | |

== District 6 ==
District 6
- November 8, 2022
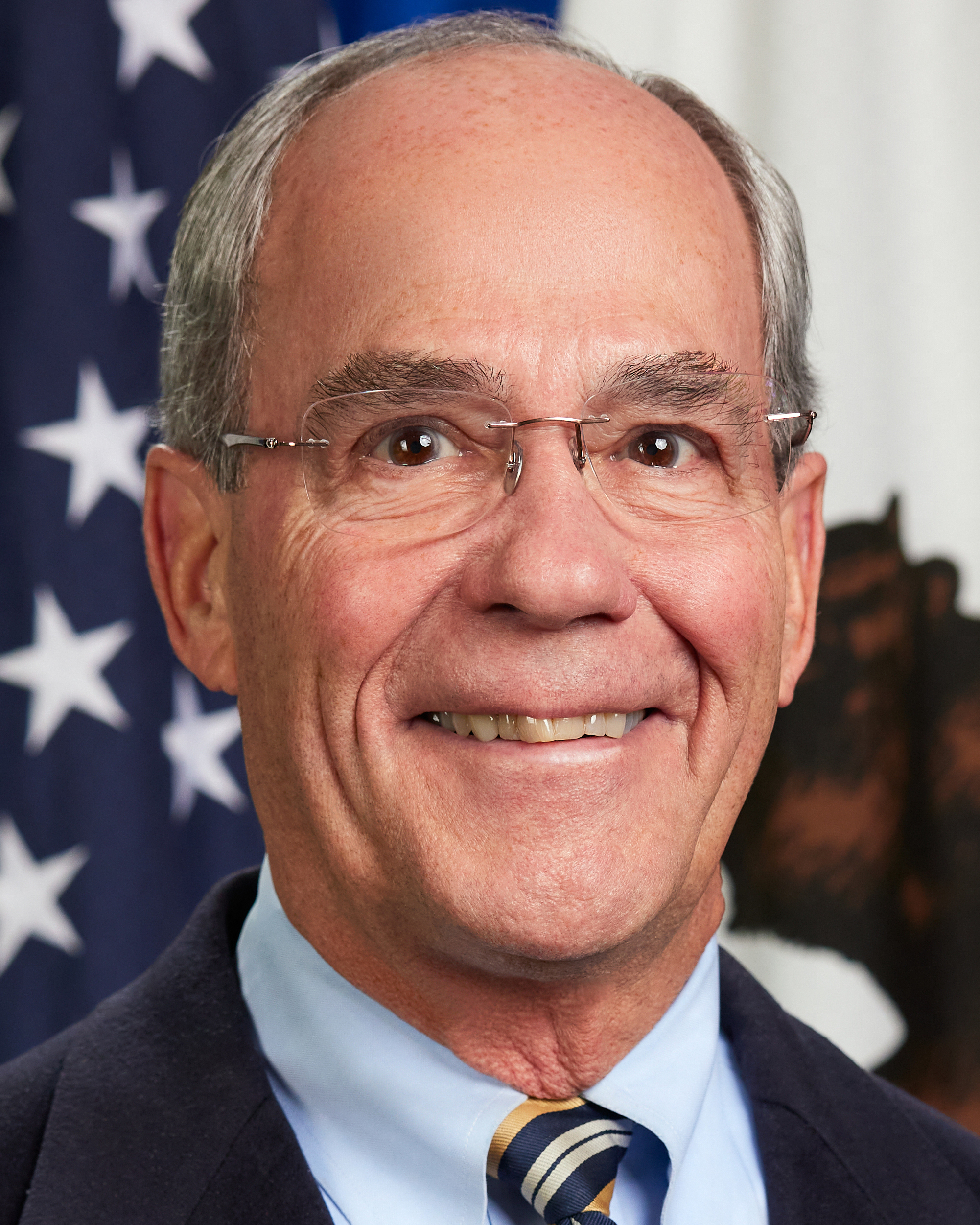

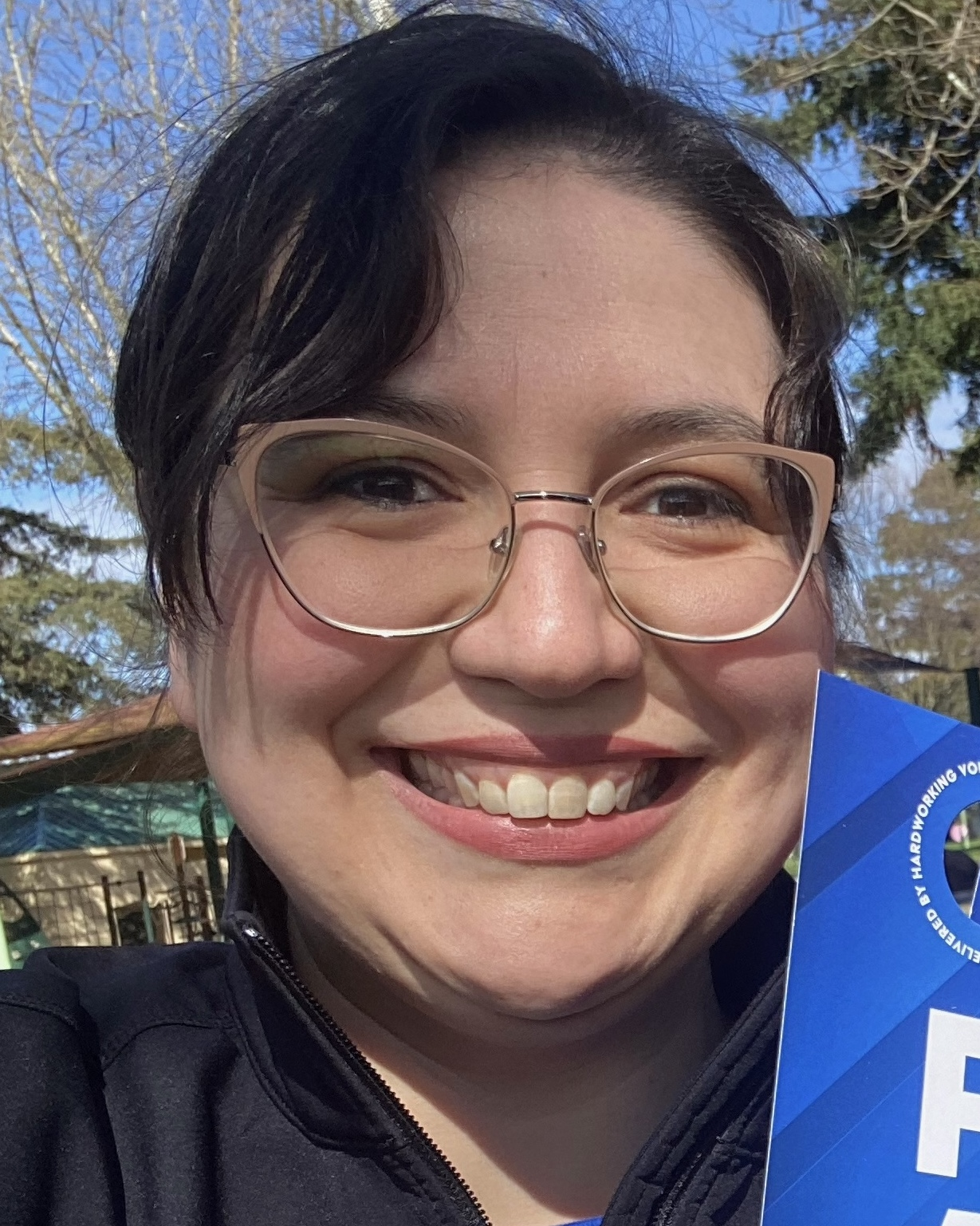
| Nominee | Roger Niello | Paula Villescaz |
| Party | Republican | Democratic |
| Popular vote | 202,569 | 160,846 |
| Percentage | 55.7% | 44.3% |
Senator before election
None (New Seat)
Elected Senator
Roger Niello
Republican

The 6th district is located in northern and eastern suburbs of the Sacramento metropolitan area, including the Sacramento County cities of Rancho Cordova, Carmichael, Fair Oaks, Gold River, Arden-Arcade, Folsom, Orangevale, Citrus Heights, and Antelope, and the western Placer County exurbs of Granite Bay, Roseville, Rocklin, Loomis, Whitney, and Lincoln. The district had no incumbent.

=== Candidates ===
==== Declared ====
- Michael Huang (Republican), family medicine physician
- Roger Niello (Republican), former state assemblyman from the 5th district
- Paula Villescaz (Democratic), director of legislative advocacy for the County Welfare Directors Association and member and former president of the San Juan Unified School District board

=== Endorsements ===
Roger Niello (R)

Organizations

- California Republican Party
Paula Villescaz (D)

Organizations

- California Democratic Party
- California Teachers Association
- Equality California
- NARAL Pro-Choice California
- SEIU United Healthcare Workers West

=== Results ===
California's 6th State Senate district, 2022
Primary election
| Party | Candidate | Votes | % |
|---|---|---|---|
| Democratic | Paula Villescaz | 105,719 | 43.1 |
| Republican | Roger Niello | 104,883 | 42.8 |
| Republican | Michael Huang | 34,604 | 14.1 |
| Total votes | | 245,206 | 100% |
General election
| Republican | Roger Niello | 202,569 | 55.7 |
| Democratic | Paula Villescaz | 160,846 | 44.3 |
| Total votes | | 363,415 | 100% |
| Republican win (new seat) | | | |

== District 8 ==
District 8
- November 8, 2022
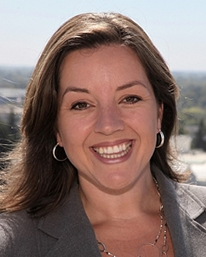

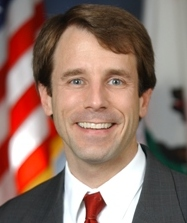
| Nominee | Angelique Ashby | Dave Jones |
| Party | Democratic | Democratic |
| Popular vote | 118,135 | 111,035 |
| Percentage | 51.5% | 48.5% |
Senator before election
Richard Pan
Democratic
Elected Senator
Angelique Ashby
Democratic

The new 8th district is located in the core of the Sacramento metropolitan area, consisting of the state capital of Sacramento and surrounding suburbs, including Rio Linda, McClellan Park, North Highlands, Vineyard, Rosemont, Florin, and Elk Grove. The incumbent in this area was Democrat Richard Pan of Sacramento of the former 6th district, who was term-limited and could not run for re-election.

=== Candidates ===
==== Declared ====
- Angelique Ashby (Democratic), vice mayor of Sacramento
- Rafa Garcia (Democratic), union representative and attorney
- Dave Jones (Democratic), former California Insurance Commissioner

==== Withdrawn ====
- Matt Burgess (Democratic), California Highway Patrol sergeant
- Eric Guerra (Democratic), Sacramento city councilor (running for State Assembly)
- Tecoy Porter (Democratic), community activist (running for State Assembly)

=== Endorsements ===
Dave Jones (D)

Organizations

- California Democratic Party
- California Teachers Association
- Equality California
- NARAL Pro-Choice California
- SEIU United Healthcare Workers West
- Sierra Club
- United Farm Workers

=== Results ===
California's 8th State Senate district, 2022
Primary election
| Party | Candidate | Votes | % |
|---|---|---|---|
| Democratic | Dave Jones | 69,269 | 46.0 |
| Democratic | Angelique Ashby | 61,700 | 41.0 |
| Democratic | Rafa Garcia | 18,947 | 12.6 |
| Republican | Susan Mason (write-in) | 527 | 0.4 |
| Total votes | | 150,443 | 100% |
General election
| Democratic | Angelique Ashby | 118,135 | 51.5 |
| Democratic | Dave Jones | 111,035 | 48.5 |
| Total votes | | 229,170 | 100% |
| Democratic hold | | | |

== District 10 ==
District 10
- November 8, 2022
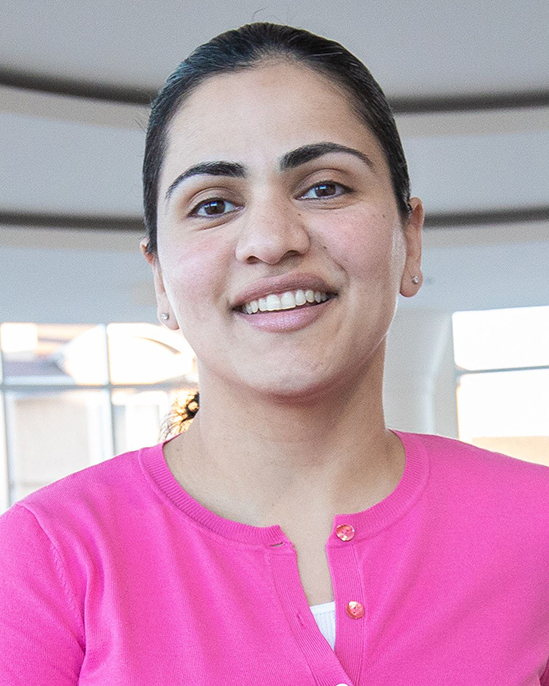

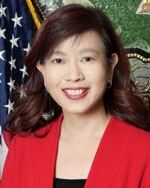
| Nominee | Aisha Wahab | Lily Mei |
| Party | Democratic | Democratic |
| Popular vote | 114,997 | 99,011 |
| Percentage | 53.7% | 46.3% |
Senator before election
Bob Wieckowski
Democratic
Elected Senator
Aisha Wahab
Democratic

The 10th district is located in the East Bay in Alameda County and the northwestern corner of Silicon Valley in Santa Clara County, including Fremont, Hayward, Union City, Newark, Milpitas, Sunnyvale, and Santa Clara. The incumbent was Democrat Bob Wieckowski of Fremont, who was term-limited and could not run for re-election.

=== Candidates ===
==== Declared ====
- Jim Canova (Democratic), member of the Santa Clara Unified School Board
- Jamal Khan (Democratic), attorney
- Raymond Liu (Democratic), engineer
- Lily Mei (Democratic), mayor of Fremont
- Paul Pimentel (Republican), telecommunications company owner
- Aisha Wahab (Democratic), Hayward city councilor and candidate for California's 15th congressional district in 2020

==== Withdrawn ====
- Jaime Raul Zepeda (Democratic), community organizer (endorsed Wahab)

=== Endorsements ===
Lily Mei (D)

Federal officials

- Ro Khanna, U.S. representative from California's 17th congressional district (2017–present)

Local officials

- Sam Liccardo, Mayor of San Jose (2015–present)
Paul Pimentel (R)

Organizations

- California Republican Party
Aisha Wahab (D)

U.S. Executive Branch officials

- Ann Ravel, former member of the Federal Election Commission (2013–2017) and candidate for California's 15th State Senate district in 2020

Statewide officials

- Rob Bonta, California Attorney General (2021–present)
- Fiona Ma, California State Treasurer (2019–present)

State legislators

- Jim Beall, former state senator from the 15th district (2012–2020) and former state assemblyman from the 24th district (2006–2012)
- Alex Lee, state assemblyman from the 25th district (2020–present)
- Bob Wieckowski, state senator from the 10th district (2014–present) and former state assemblyman from the 25th district (2010–2014)

Organizations

- California Democratic Party
- California Teachers Association
- Equality California
- NARAL Pro-Choice California
- Planned Parenthood Advocates Mar Monte
- SEIU United Healthcare Workers West
- Working Families Party

=== Forum ===
2022 California State Senate election District 10 blanket primary candidate forum
| No. | Date | Host | Moderator | Link | Democratic | Democratic | Democratic | Democratic |
| Key: P Participant A Absent N Not invited I Invited W Withdrawn | | | | | | | | |
| Key: P Participant A Absent N Not invited I Invited W Withdrawn | | | | | Jim Canova | Jamal Khan | Lily Mei | Aisha Wahab |
|---|---|---|---|---|---|---|---|---|
| 1 | Mar. 31, 2022 | SV@Home Action Fund | Devin Fehely | YouTube | P | P | P | P |

=== Results ===
California's 10th State Senate district, 2022
Primary election
| Party | Candidate | Votes | % |
|---|---|---|---|
| Democratic | Lily Mei | 47,149 | 33.1 |
| Democratic | Aisha Wahab | 42,731 | 30.0 |
| Republican | Paul J. Pimentel | 30,742 | 21.6 |
| Democratic | Jamal Khan | 10,424 | 7.3 |
| Democratic | Raymond Liu | 6,932 | 4.9 |
| Democratic | Jim Canova | 4,391 | 3.1 |
| Total votes | | 142,369 | 100% |
General election
| Democratic | Aisha Wahab | 114,997 | 53.7 |
| Democratic | Lily Mei | 99,011 | 46.3 |
| Total votes | | 214,008 | 100% |
| Democratic hold | | | |

== District 12 ==
District 12
- November 8, 2022
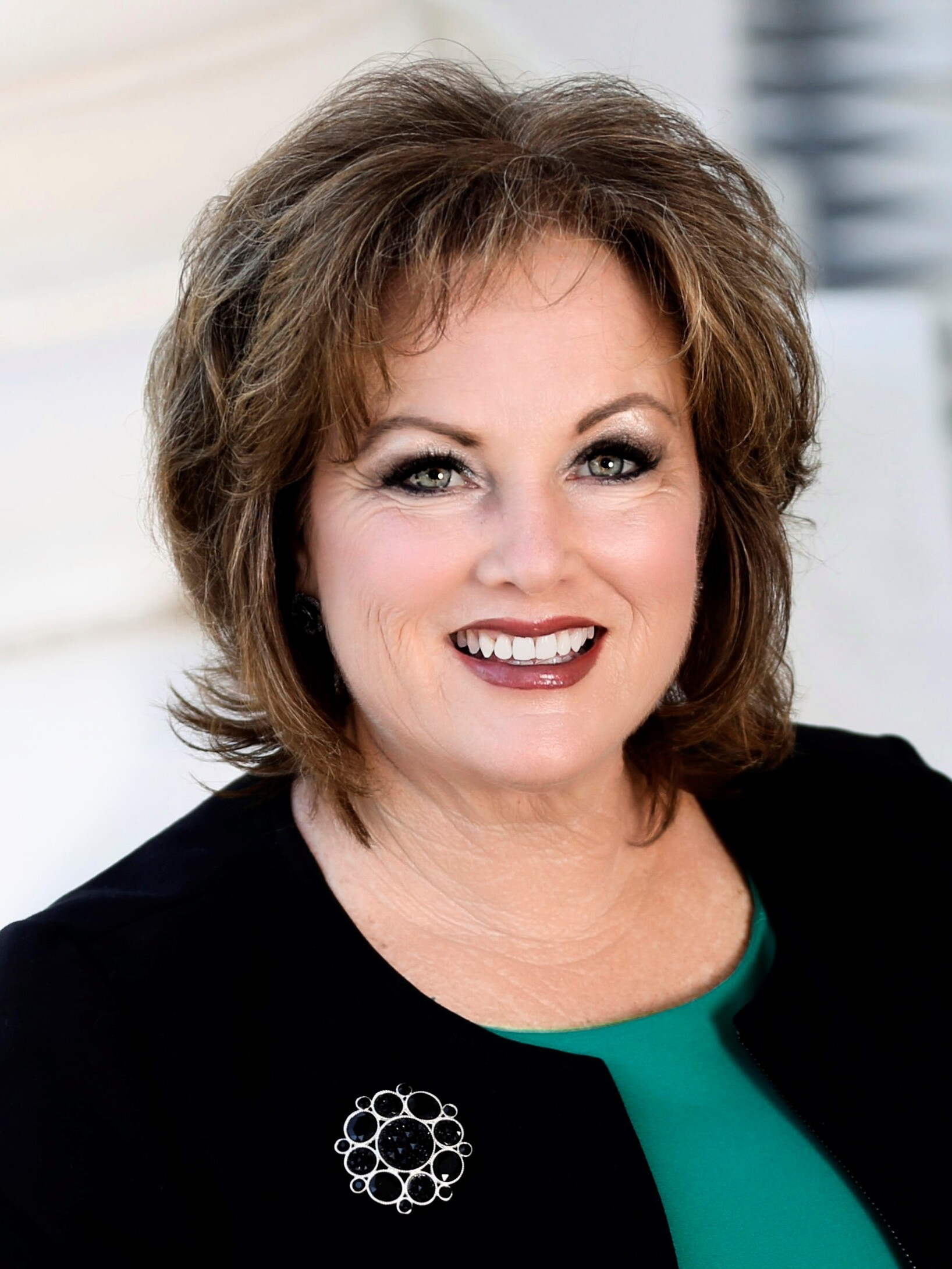

| Nominee | Shannon Grove | Susanne Gundy |
| Party | Republican | Democratic |
| Popular vote | 119,319 | 89,469 |
| Percentage | 68.7% | 31.3% |
Senator before election
Andreas Borgeas (Republican)
Shannon Grove (Republican)
Elected Senator
Shannon Grove
Republican

The new 12th district encompasses the southeastern Central Valley and the northwestern corner of the Mojave Desert, including most of Kern County and the eastern portions of Tulare County and Fresno County. It merged the districts of first-term Republican Shannon Grove of Bakersfield of the former 16th district, who was running for re-election here, and first-term Republican Andreas Borgeas of the former 8th district, who decided not to seek reelection.

=== Candidates ===
==== Declared ====
- Shannon Grove (Republican), incumbent state senator from the 16th district
- Susanne Gundy (Democratic), retired program manager

=== Endorsements ===
Shannon Grove (R)

Organizations

- California Republican Party
Susanne Gundy (D)

Organizations

- California Democratic Party

=== Results ===
California's 12th State Senate district, 2022
Primary election
| Party | Candidate | Votes | % |
|---|---|---|---|
| Republican | Shannon Grove (incumbent) | 119,319 | 68.7 |
| Democratic | Susanne Gundy | 54,289 | 31.3 |
| Total votes | | 173,608 | 100% |
General election
| Republican | Shannon Grove (incumbent) | 196,014 | 68.7 |
| Democratic | Susanne Gundy | 89,469 | 31.3 |
| Total votes | | 285,483 | 100% |
| Republican hold | | | |

== District 14 ==
District 14
- November 8, 2022
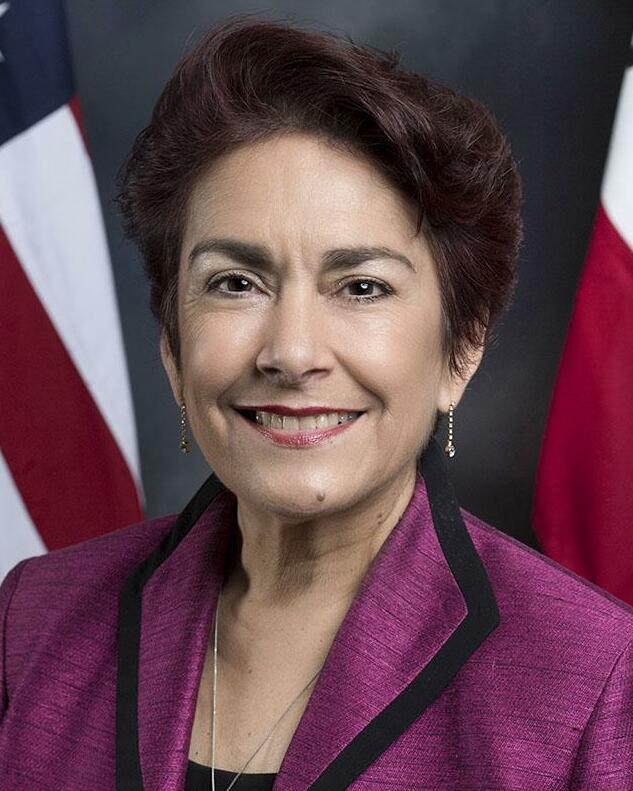

| Nominee | Anna Caballero | Amnon Shor |
| Party | Democratic | Republican |
| Popular vote | 90,016 | 69,970 |
| Percentage | 56.3% | 43.7% |
Senators before election
Anna Caballero
Democratic
Elected Senators
Anna Caballero
Democratic

The new 14th district is located in the western Central Valley, including Merced County and western Fresno County. The incumbents in this area were first-term Democrat Anna Caballero of Merced and the former 12th district, and first-term Democrat Melissa Hurtado of Sanger and the former 14th district. Both incumbents initially were running for re-election in this district, but Hurtado dropped out to run for the 16th district.

=== Candidates ===
==== Declared ====
- Anna Caballero (Democratic), incumbent state senator from the 12th district
- Paulina Miranda (Democratic), perennial candidate
- Amnon Shor (Republican), rabbi

==== Withdrawn ====
- Melissa Hurtado (Democratic), incumbent state senator from the 14th district (running in the 16th district)

=== Endorsements ===
Anna Caballero (D)

Individuals

- Dolores Huerta, labor and civil rights activist

Organizations

- California Democratic Party
- California Teachers Association
- Equality California
- SEIU United Healthcare Workers West
Amnon Shor (R)

Organizations

- California Republican Party

=== Results ===
California's 14th State Senate district, 2022
Primary election
| Party | Candidate | Votes | % |
|---|---|---|---|
| Democratic | Anna Caballero (incumbent) | 47,488 | 52.0 |
| Republican | Amnon Shor | 38,244 | 41.9 |
| Democratic | Paulina Miranda | 5,530 | 6.1 |
| Total votes | | 91,262 | 100% |
General election
| Democratic | Anna Caballero (incumbent) | 90,016 | 56.3 |
| Republican | Amnon Shor | 69,970 | 43.7 |
| Total votes | | 159,986 | 100% |
| Democratic hold | | | |

== District 16 ==
District 16
- November 8, 2022
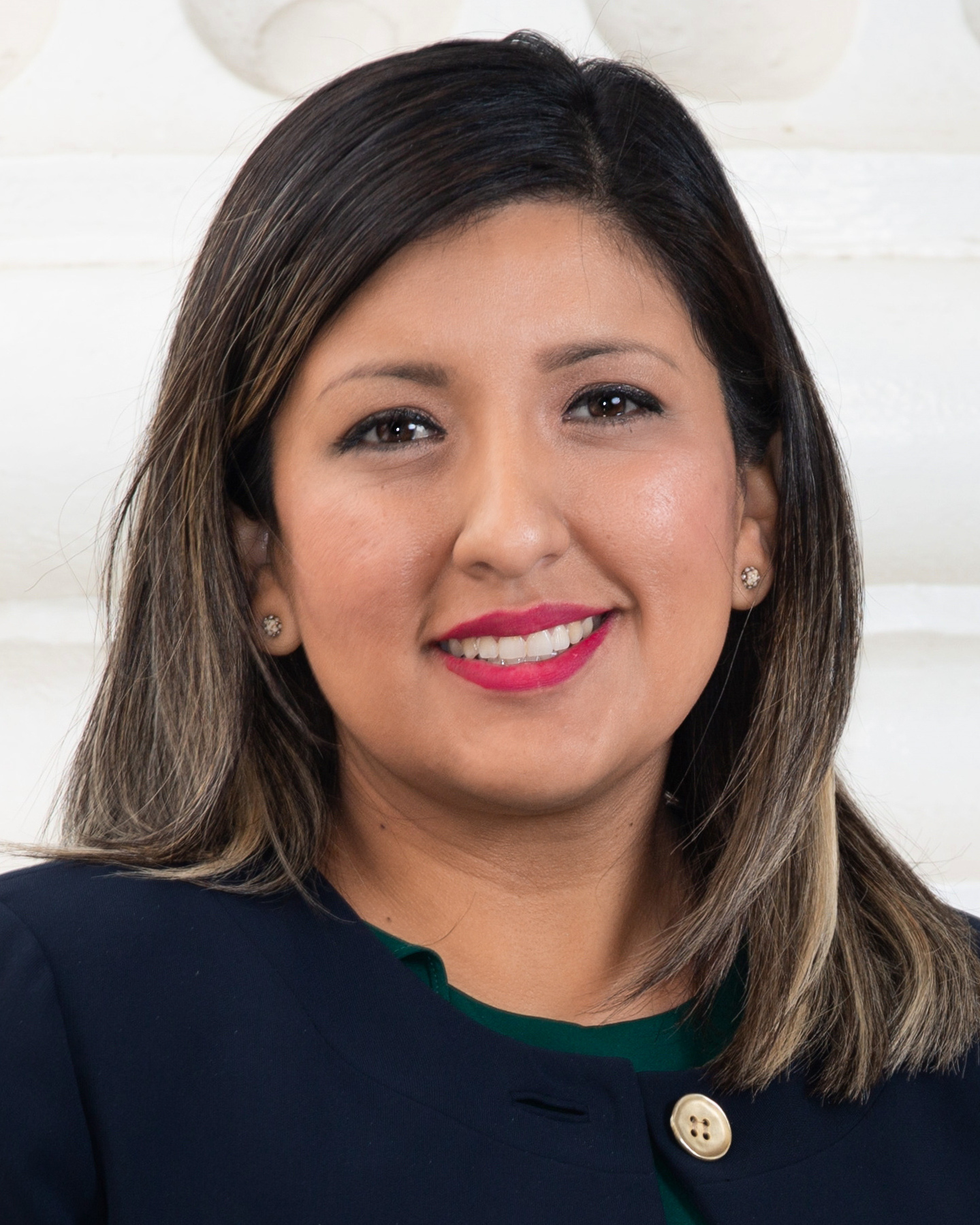

| Nominee | Melissa Hurtado | David Shepard |
| Party | Democratic | Republican |
| Popular vote | 68,461 | 68,448 |
| Percentage | 50.005% | 49.995% |
Senator before election
Melissa Hurtado
Democratic
Elected Senator
Melissa Hurtado
Democratic

The new 16th district encompasses the southwestern Central Valley, including Kings County, western Tulare County, and northwestern Kern County. The seat originally had no incumbent, but first-term Democrat Melissa Hurtado of Sanger eventually chose to run for re-election here. On December 14, candidate David Shepard filed for a recount, after the race was certified with Senator Hurtado in the lead by a 20-vote margin. The recount concluded on January 17, with Shepard gaining 11 votes, while Hurtado gained 4.

=== Candidates ===
==== Declared ====
- Melissa Hurtado (Democratic), incumbent state senator from the 14th district
- Bryan Osorio (Democratic), mayor of Delano
- Nicole Parra (Democratic), former state assemblywoman from the 30th district
- David Shepard (Republican), grape farmer
- Gregory Tatum (Republican), pastor

==== Withdrawn ====
- Imelda Ceja (Democratic), nurse
- Rob Fuentes (Democratic), attorney

=== Endorsements ===
Melissa Hurtado (D)

State legislators

- Adam Gray, state assemblyman from the 21st district (2012–present)
Bryan Osorio (D)

Individuals

- Jane Fonda, actress and activist

Organizations

- Courage California
- United Farm Workers
David Shepard (R)

Organizations

- California Republican Party

=== Results ===
California's 16th State Senate district, 2022
Primary election
| Party | Candidate | Votes | % |
|---|---|---|---|
| Republican | David Shepard | 32,579 | 43.4 |
| Democratic | Melissa Hurtado (incumbent) | 22,162 | 29.6 |
| Democratic | Nicole Parra | 9,921 | 13.2 |
| Republican | Gregory Tatum | 6,016 | 8.0 |
| Democratic | Bryan Osorio | 4,344 | 5.8 |
| Total votes | | 75,022 | 100% |
General election
| Democratic | Melissa Hurtado (incumbent) | 68,461 | 50.005 |
| Republican | David Shepard | 68,448 | 49.995 |
| Total votes | | 136,909 | 100% |
| Democratic hold | | | |

== District 18 ==
District 18
- November 8, 2022
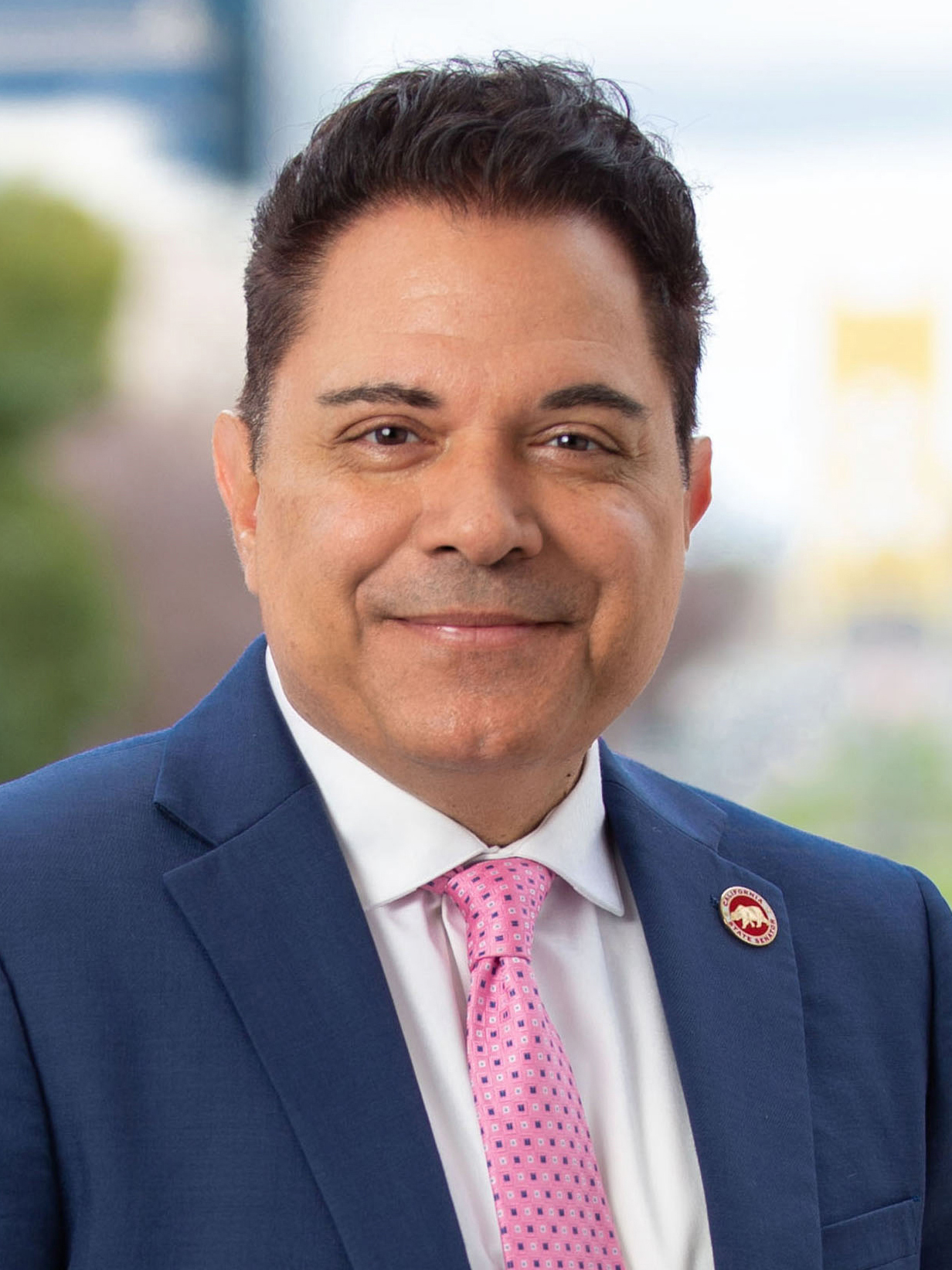

| Nominee | Steve Padilla | Alejandro Galicia |
| Party | Democratic | Republican |
| Popular vote | 115,103 | 77,223 |
| Percentage | 59.8% | 40.2% |
Senator before election
Ben Hueso
Democratic
Elected Senator
Steve Padilla
Democratic

The new 18th district stretches along the Mexico–United States border and includes rural Imperial Valley and areas of California along the Colorado River, including Needles, Blythe and Indio, but most of the population is in southern San Diego County, including Imperial Beach, Otay Mesa, Chula Vista, National City, Lincoln Acres, Bonita, the Tijuana River Valley, and the southeast side of San Diego. The incumbent in this area was two-term Democrat Ben Hueso of San Diego and the former 40th district, who was term-limited and could not seek re-election.

=== Candidates ===
==== Declared ====
- Alejandro Galicia (Republican), business owner
- Steve Padilla (Democratic), Chula Vista city councilor

=== Endorsements ===
Alejandro Galicia (R)

Organizations

- California Republican Party
Steve Padilla (D)

Organizations

- California Democratic Party
- California Teachers Association
- Equality California
- SEIU United Healthcare Workers West

=== Results ===
California's 18th State Senate district, 2022
Primary election
| Party | Candidate | Votes | % |
|---|---|---|---|
| Democratic | Steve Padilla | 74,495 | 61.0 |
| Republican | Alejandro Galicia | 47,689 | 39.0 |
| Total votes | | 122,184 | 100% |
General election
| Democratic | Steve Padilla | 115,103 | 59.8 |
| Republican | Alejandro Galicia | 77,223 | 40.2 |
| Total votes | | 192,326 | 100% |
| Democratic hold | | | |

== District 20 ==
District 20
- November 8, 2022
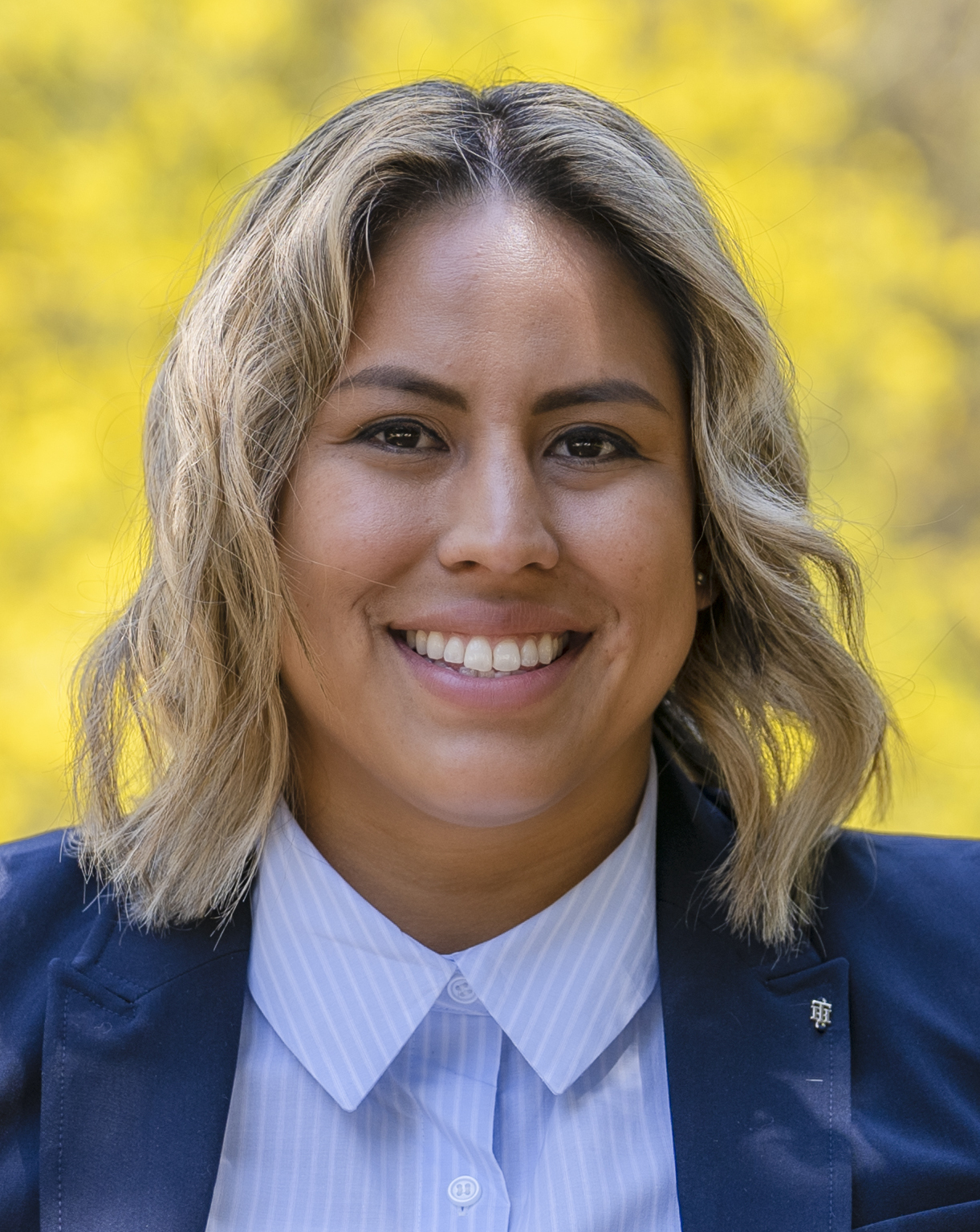

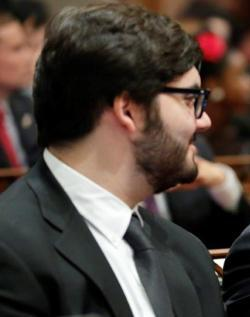
| Nominee | Caroline Menjivar | Daniel Hertzberg |
| Party | Democratic | Democratic |
| Popular vote | 88,358 | 62,787 |
| Percentage | 58.5% | 41.5% |
Senator before election
Robert Hertzberg
Democratic
Elected Senator
Caroline Menjivar
Democratic

The new 20th district contains most of the San Fernando Valley section of northern Los Angeles, including Burbank, Van Nuys, Reseda, Canoga Park, Tujunga, Sun Valley, Shadow Hills, Lake View Terrace, Arleta, Panorama City, Pacoima, Mission Hills, San Fernando, and Sylmar. The incumbent in this area was two-term Democrat Robert Hertzberg of Van Nuys and the former 18th district, who was term-limited and could not seek re-election.

=== Candidates ===
==== Declared ====
- Ely De La Cruz Ayao (Republican), real estate broker
- Daniel Hertzberg (Democratic), business travel sales manager and son of incumbent state senator Robert Hertzberg
- Caroline Menjivar (Democratic), social worker
- Seydi Alejandra Morales (Democratic), attorney

=== Endorsements ===
Ely De La Cruz Ayao (R)

Organizations

- California Republican Party
Daniel Hertzberg (D)

Federal officials

- Tony Cárdenas, U.S. representative for California's 29th congressional district (2013–present)

State legislators

- Richard Pan, state senator from the 6th district (2014–present) and former state assemblyman from the 9th district (2010–2014)
- John Pérez, former Speaker of the California State Assembly (2010–2014) from the 53rd district (2008–2014)

Organizations

- California Democratic Party
- Equality California (co-endorsed with Menjivar)
- SEIU United Healthcare Workers West
Caroline Menjivar (D)

Newspapers

- Los Angeles Times

Organizations

- Equality California (co-endorsed with Hertzberg)
- NARAL Pro-Choice California
- Stonewall Democrats
- VoteVets.org
- Working Families Party

=== Results ===
California's 20th State Senate district, 2022
Primary election
| Party | Candidate | Votes | % |
|---|---|---|---|
| Democratic | Daniel Hertzberg | 33,449 | 30.8 |
| Democratic | Caroline Menjivar | 32,302 | 29.8 |
| Republican | Ely De La Cruz Ayao | 27,713 | 25.5 |
| Democratic | Seydi Alejandra Morales | 15,078 | 13.9 |
| Total votes | | 108,542 | 100% |
General election
| Democratic | Caroline Menjivar | 88,358 | 58.5 |
| Democratic | Daniel Hertzberg | 62,787 | 41.5 |
| Total votes | | 151,145 | 100% |
| Democratic hold | | | |

== District 22 ==
District 22
- November 8, 2022
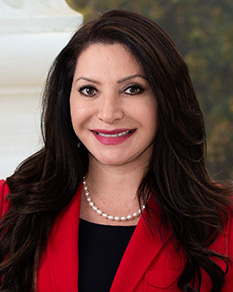

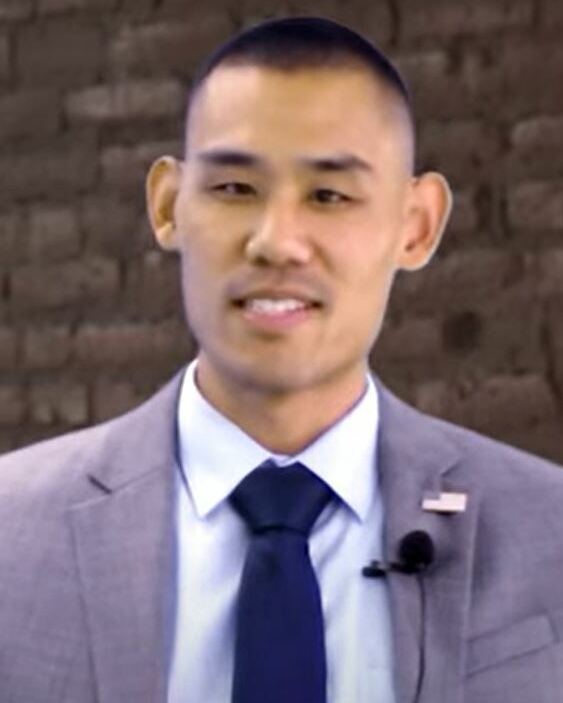
| Nominee | Susan Rubio | Vincent Tsai |
| Party | Democratic | Republican |
| Popular vote | 110,327 | 78,156 |
| Percentage | 58.5% | 41.5% |
Senators before election
Connie Leyva (Democratic)
Susan Rubio (Democratic)
Elected Senators
Susan Rubio
Democratic

The new 22nd district consists of the eastern San Gabriel Valley and the Pomona Valley in Los Angeles County, including El Monte, West Covina, Covina, Duarte, Baldwin Park, Irwindale, Vincent, Azusa, San Dimas, La Verne, and Pomona, as well as Montclair, Chino, and Ontario in the southwestern corner of San Bernardino County. The incumbents in this area were first-term Democrat Susan Rubio of Baldwin Park or the former 22nd district, and second-term Democrat Connie Leyva of Chino or the former 20th district. Rubio ran for re-election, while Leyva ran for San Bernardino County Supervisor.

=== Candidates ===
==== Declared ====
- Kimo Mateo (Republican), operations manager
- Susan Rubio (Democratic), incumbent state senator
- Vincent Tsai (Republican), Los Angeles County Deputy sheriff

==== Declined ====
- Connie Leyva, incumbent state senator from the 20th district

=== Endorsements ===
Susan Rubio (D)

Organizations

- California Democratic Party
- Stonewall Democrats

=== Results ===
California's 22nd State Senate district, 2022
Primary election
| Party | Candidate | Votes | % |
|---|---|---|---|
| Democratic | Susan Rubio (incumbent) | 63,394 | 59.7 |
| Republican | Vincent Tsai | 28,262 | 26.6 |
| Republican | Kimo Mateo | 14,479 | 13.7 |
| Total votes | | 106,135 | 100% |
General election
| Democratic | Susan Rubio (incumbent) | 110,327 | 58.5 |
| Republican | Vincent Tsai | 78,156 | 41.5 |
| Total votes | | 188,483 | 100% |
| Democratic hold | | | |

== District 24 ==
District 24
- November 8, 2022
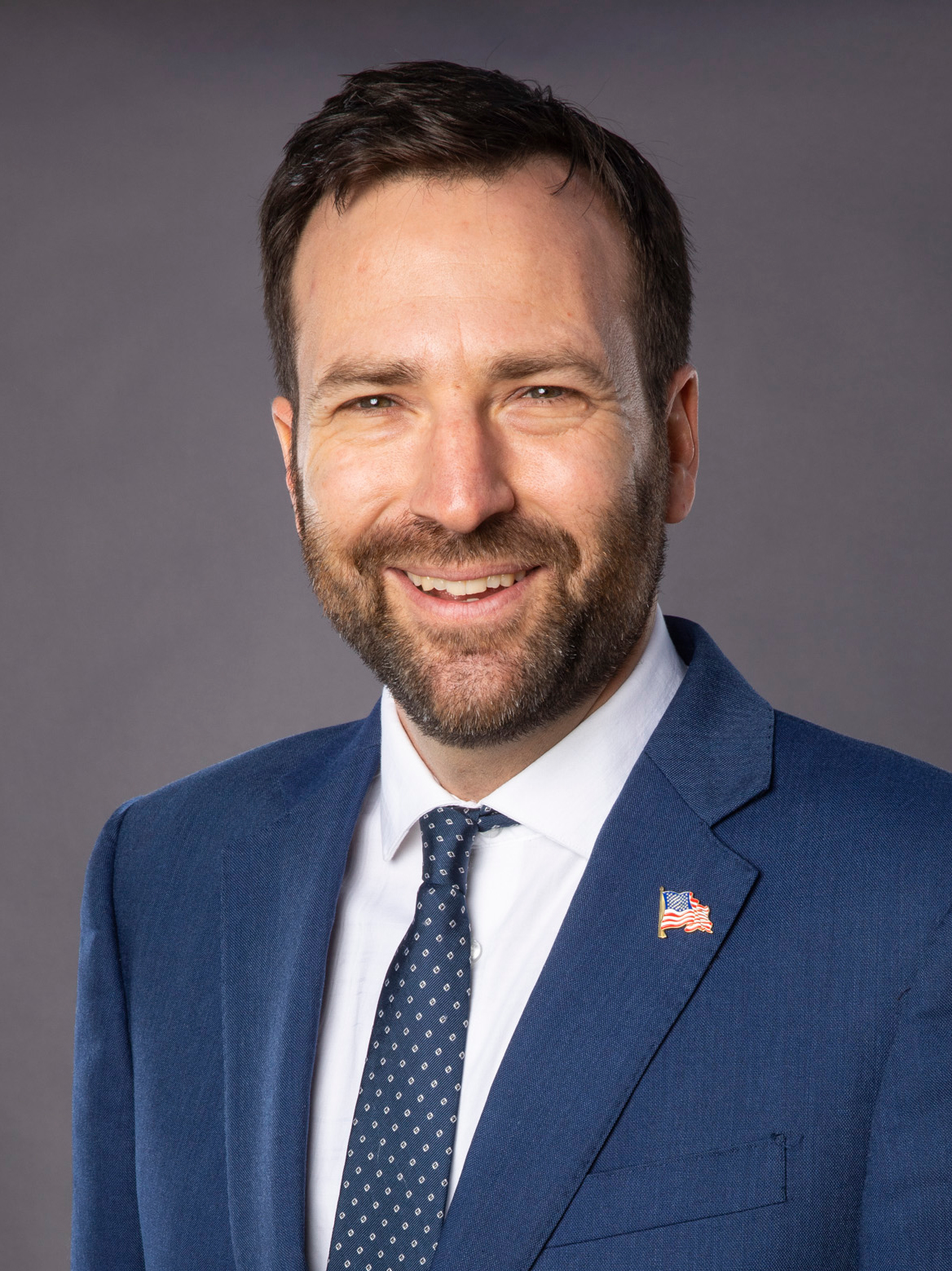

| Nominee | Ben Allen | Kristina Irwin |
| Party | Democratic | Republican |
| Popular vote | 248,642 | 121,809 |
| Percentage | 67.1% | 32.9% |
Senator before election
Ben Allen
Democratic
Elected Senator
Ben Allen
Democratic

The new 24th district contains the Westside Los Angeles neighborhoods of Venice, West Los Angeles, Pacific Palisades, Brentwood, Bel Air, Century City, Sunset Strip, Laurel Canyon, Hollywood, and Miracle Mile, and the Santa Monica Mountains cities such as Hidden Hills, Calabasas, Topanga, and Malibu, as well as most of the South Bay cities of Los Angeles County, including Rancho Palos Verdes, Rolling Hills, Torrance, Redondo Beach, Manhattan Beach, El Segundo, Marina Del Rey, Santa Monica, Beverly Hills, and West Hollywood. The incumbent in this area was two-term Democrat Ben Allen of Santa Monica and the former 26th district, who ran for re-election.

=== Candidates ===
==== Declared ====
- Ben Allen (Democratic), incumbent state senator
- Kristina Irwin (Republican), realtor (write-in)

=== Endorsements ===
Ben Allen (D)

Organizations

- California Democratic Party
- California Teachers Association
- Equality California
- Stonewall Democrats
- SEIU United Healthcare Workers West
- Sierra Club

=== Results ===
California's 24th State Senate district, 2022
Primary election
| Party | Candidate | Votes | % |
|---|---|---|---|
| Democratic | Ben Allen (incumbent) | 165,421 | 96.2 |
| Republican | Kristina Irwin (write-in) | 6,260 | 3.6 |
| Republican | Edwin P. Duterte (write-in) | 213 | 0.1 |
| Total votes | | 171,894 | 100% |
General election
| Democratic | Ben Allen (incumbent) | 248,642 | 67.1 |
| Republican | Kristina Irwin | 121,809 | 32.9 |
| Total votes | | 370,451 | 100% |
| Democratic hold | | | |

== District 26 ==
District 26
- November 8, 2022
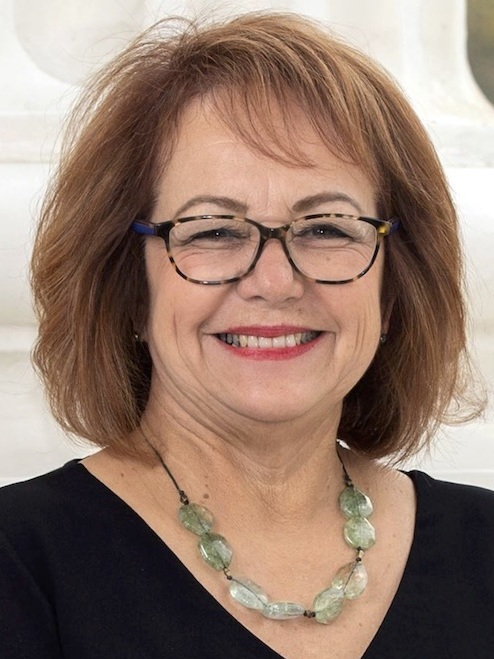

| Nominee | María Elena Durazo | Claudia Agraz |
| Party | Democratic | Republican |
| Popular vote | 155,727 | 32,022 |
| Percentage | 82.9% | 17.1% |
Senator before election
María Elena Durazo
Democratic
Elected Senator
María Elena Durazo
Democratic

The new 26th district is located in the central and eastern Los Angeles neighborhoods of Los Feliz, East Hollywood, Silver Lake, Echo Park, Cypress Park, Koreatown, Wilshire Center, Westlake, Glassell Park, Eagle Rock, Garvanza, Lincoln Heights, Hermon, Little Tokyo, Chinatown, Boyle Heights, and El Sereno, along with the adjascent communities of City Terrace, East Los Angeles and Vernon. The incumbent in this area was first-term Democrat Maria Elena Durazo of Los Angeles and the former 24th district, who sought re-election.

=== Candidates ===
==== Declared ====
- Maria Elena Durazo (Democratic), incumbent state senator

=== Endorsements ===
Maria Elena Durazo (D)

Organizations

- California Democratic Party
- California Teachers Association
- Equality California
- NARAL Pro-Choice California
- Stonewall Democrats
- SEIU United Healthcare Workers West
- Sierra Club
- United Farm Workers

=== Results ===
California's 26th State Senate district, 2022
Primary election
| Party | Candidate | Votes | % |
|---|---|---|---|
| Democratic | María Elena Durazo (incumbent) | 108,999 | 99.6 |
| Republican | Claudia Agraz (write-in) | 425 | 0.4 |
| Total votes | | 109,424 | 100% |
General election
| Democratic | María Elena Durazo (incumbent) | 155,727 | 82.9 |
| Republican | Claudia Agraz | 32,022 | 17.1 |
| Total votes | | 187,749 | 100% |
| Democratic hold | | | |

== District 28 ==
District 28
- November 8, 2022
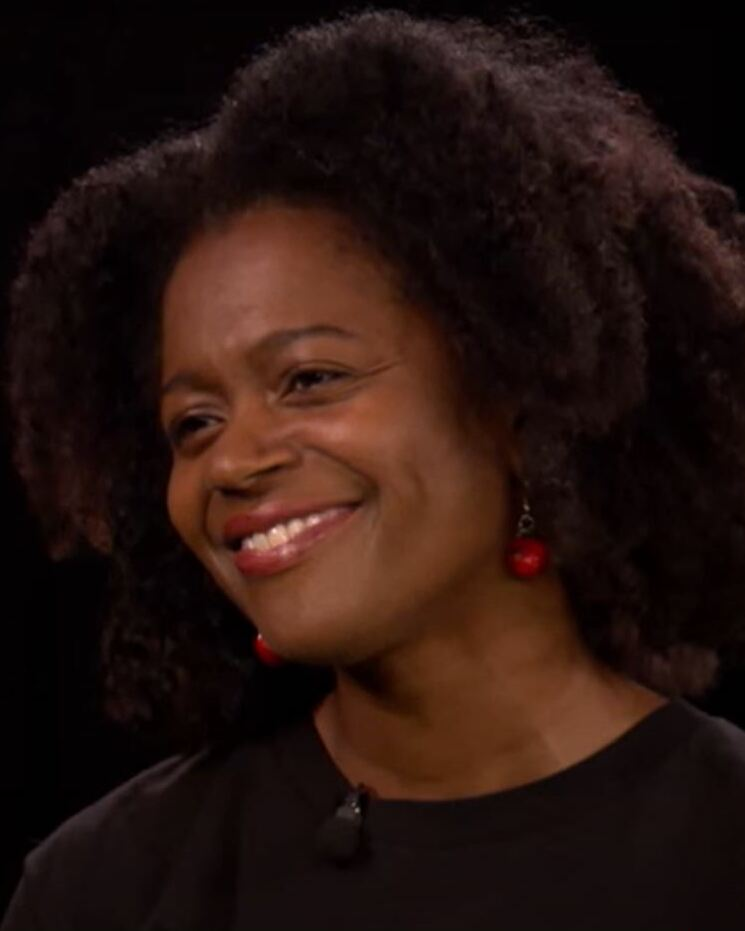

| Nominee | Lola Smallwood-Cuevas | Cheryl Turner |
| Party | Democratic | Democratic |
| Popular vote | 117,315 | 78,453 |
| Percentage | 59.9% | 40.1% |
Senator before election
Sydney Kamlager-Dove
Democratic
Elected Senator
Lola Smallwood-Cuevas
Democratic

The new 28th district contains Downtown Los Angeles and most of South Central Los Angeles, including Park La Brea, Pico Union, Mid City, West Adams, Baldwin Hills, Hyde Park, Nevin, Leimert Park, Jefferson Park, Crenshaw, Vermont Square, Adams-Normandie, Florence, Exposition Park, and University Park, as well as suburbs of Culver City, Ladera Heights, and a small part of the Westside Los Angeles neighborhoods, including Palms, Mar Vista and Playa Vista. The incumbent in this area was first-term Democrat Sydney Kamlager-Dove of Los Angeles and the former 30th district, who left to run for a seat in the United States House of Representatives.

=== Candidates ===
==== Declared ====
- Jamaal Gulledge (Democratic), human resources manager
- Joe Lusizzo (Republican), restaurant owner
- Kamilah Victoria Moore (Democratic), attorney
- Lola Smallwood-Cuevas (Democratic), labor advocate
- Cheryl Turner (Democratic), civil rights lawyer

=== Endorsements ===
Joe Lusizzo (R)

Organizations

- California Republican Party
Lola Smallwood-Cuevas (D)

Organizations

- California Democratic Party
- California Teachers Association
- Courage California
- Equality California
- Stonewall Democrats
- SEIU United Healthcare Workers West
- Sierra Club
- Working Families Party

=== Forum ===
2022 California State Senate election District 28 blanket primary candidate forum
| No. | Date | Host | Moderator | Link | Democratic | Democratic | Democratic |
| Key: P Participant A Absent N Not invited I Invited W Withdrawn | | | | | | | |
| Key: P Participant A Absent N Not invited I Invited W Withdrawn | | | | | Jamaal Gulledge | Lola Smallwood-Cuevas | Cheryl Turner |
|---|---|---|---|---|---|---|---|
| 1 | Feb. 27, 2022 | Culver City Democratic Club | Maximina Juson | YouTube | P | P | P |

=== Results ===
California's 28th State Senate district, 2022
Primary election
| Party | Candidate | Votes | % |
|---|---|---|---|
| Democratic | Lola Smallwood-Cuevas | 63,211 | 44.8 |
| Democratic | Cheryl Turner | 42,728 | 30.3 |
| Republican | Joe Lusizzo | 20,785 | 14.7 |
| Democratic | Kamilah Victoria Moore | 9,162 | 6.5 |
| Democratic | Jamaal Gulledge | 5,267 | 3.7 |
| Total votes | | 141,153 | 100% |
General election
| Democratic | Lola Smallwood-Cuevas | 117,315 | 59.9 |
| Democratic | Cheryl Turner | 78,453 | 40.1 |
| Total votes | | 195,768 | 100% |
| Democratic hold | | | |

== District 30 ==
District 30
- November 8, 2022
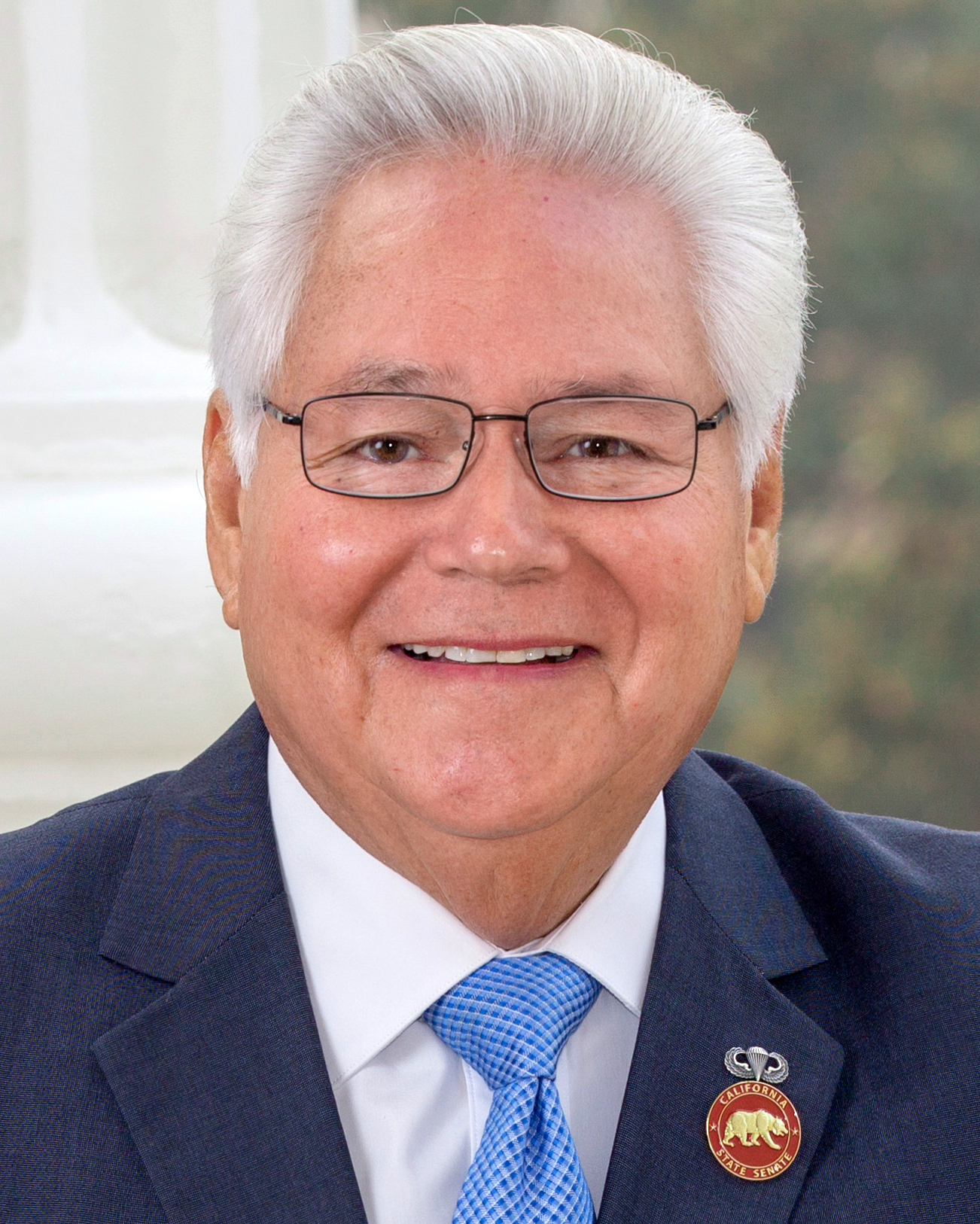

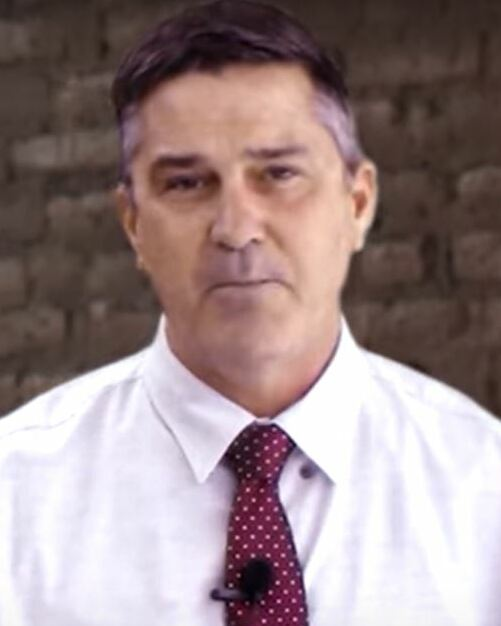
| Nominee | Bob Archuleta | Mitch Clemmons |
| Party | Democratic | Republican |
| Popular vote | 129,890 | 83,214 |
| Percentage | 61.0% | 39.0 |
Senator before election
Bob Archuleta
Democratic
Elected Senator
Bob Archuleta
Democratic

The new 30th district contains the Gateway Cities region of southeastern Los Angeles County, including Downey, Norwalk, Bellflower, La Mirada, Santa Fe Springs, Los Nietos, Montebello, Pico Rivera, Whittier, Hacienda Heights, La Puente, Valinda, Avocado Heights, Industry, Rowland Heights, Walnut, and Diamond Bar, along with Brea in northeastern Orange County. The incumbent in this area was first-term Democrat Bob Archuleta of the former 32nd district, who sought re-election.

=== Candidates ===
==== Declared ====
- Bob Archuleta (Democratic), incumbent state senator from the 32nd district
- Henry Bouchot (Democratic), Whittier city councilor
- Martha Camacho Rodriguez (Democratic), teacher
- Mitch Clemmons (Republican), plumbing business owner

=== Endorsements ===
Bob Archuleta (D)

Organizations

- California Democratic Party
- California Teachers Association
- SEIU United Healthcare Workers West
Henry Bouchot (D)

Organizations

- Stonewall Democrats
- VoteVets.org
Mitch Clemmons (R)

Organizations

- California Republican Party

=== Results ===
California's 30th State Senate district, 2022
Primary election
| Party | Candidate | Votes | % |
|---|---|---|---|
| Democratic | Bob Archuleta (incumbent) | 43,243 | 35.6 |
| Republican | Mitch Clemmons | 41,287 | 34.0 |
| Democratic | Martha Camacho Rodriguez | 19,011 | 15.7 |
| Democratic | Henry Bouchot | 17,820 | 14.7 |
| Total votes | | 121,361 | 100% |
General election
| Democratic | Bob Archuleta (incumbent) | 129,890 | 61.0 |
| Republican | Mitch Clemmons | 83,214 | 39.0 |
| Total votes | | 213,104 | 100% |
| Democratic hold | | | |

== District 32 ==
District 32
- November 8, 2022
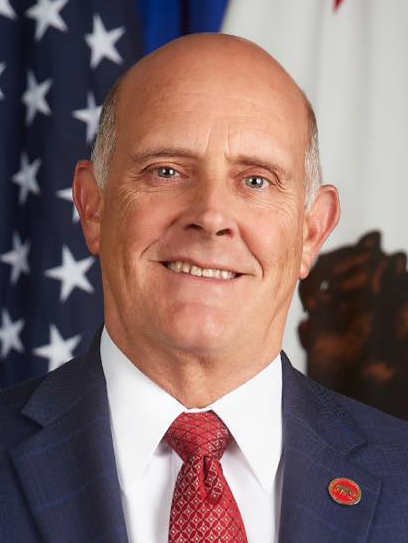

| Nominee | Kelly Seyarto | Brian Nash |
| Party | Republican | Democratic |
| Popular vote | 184,086 | 112,763 |
| Percentage | 62.0% | 38.0% |
Senator before election
Melissa Melendez
Republican
Elected Senator
Kelly Seyarto
Republican

The new 32nd district consists of the southwestern corner of the Inland Empire, including the Riverside County communities of Temecula, Murrieta, Wildomar, Lake Elsinore, Canyon Lake, Lakeland Village, Alberhill, Menifee, Sage, and Idyllwild, along with Yorba Linda in eastern Orange County, Chino Hills in southwestern San Bernardino County and the rural, northeastern corner of San Diego County. The incumbent in this area, Republican Melissa Melendez of the former 28th district, was term-limited and could not seek re-election.

=== Candidates ===
==== Declared ====
- Brian Nash (Democratic), analytics consultant
- Kelly Seyarto (Republican), state assemblyman from the 67th district

=== Endorsements ===
Kelly Seyarto (R)

Organizations

- California Republican Party

=== Results ===
California's 32nd State Senate district, 2022
Primary election
| Party | Candidate | Votes | % |
|---|---|---|---|
| Republican | Kelly Seyarto | 112,728 | 62.8 |
| Democratic | Brian Nash | 66,664 | 37.2 |
| Total votes | | 179,392 | 100% |
General election
| Republican | Kelly Seyarto | 184,086 | 62.0 |
| Democratic | Brian Nash | 112,763 | 38.0 |
| Total votes | | 296,849 | 100% |
| Republican hold | | | |

== District 34 ==
District 34
- November 8, 2022
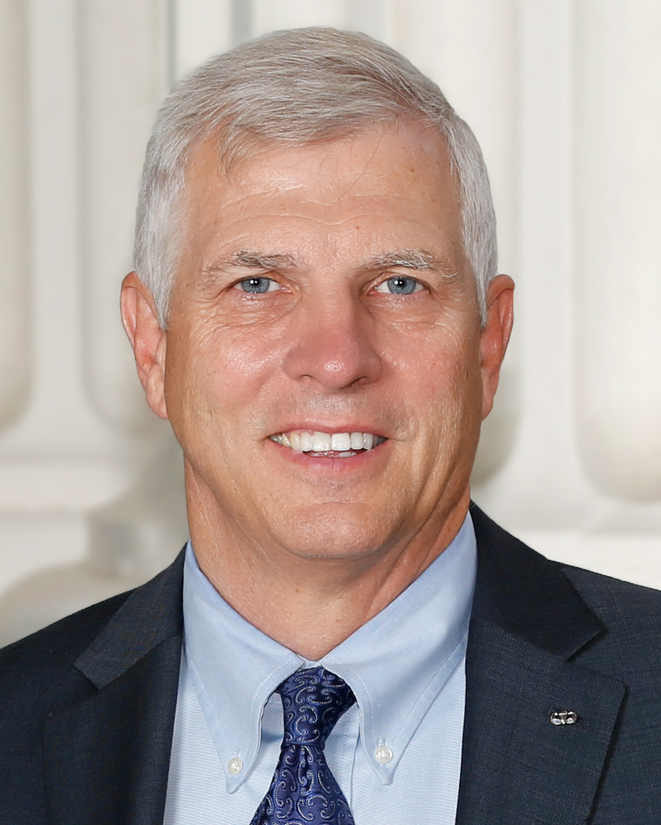

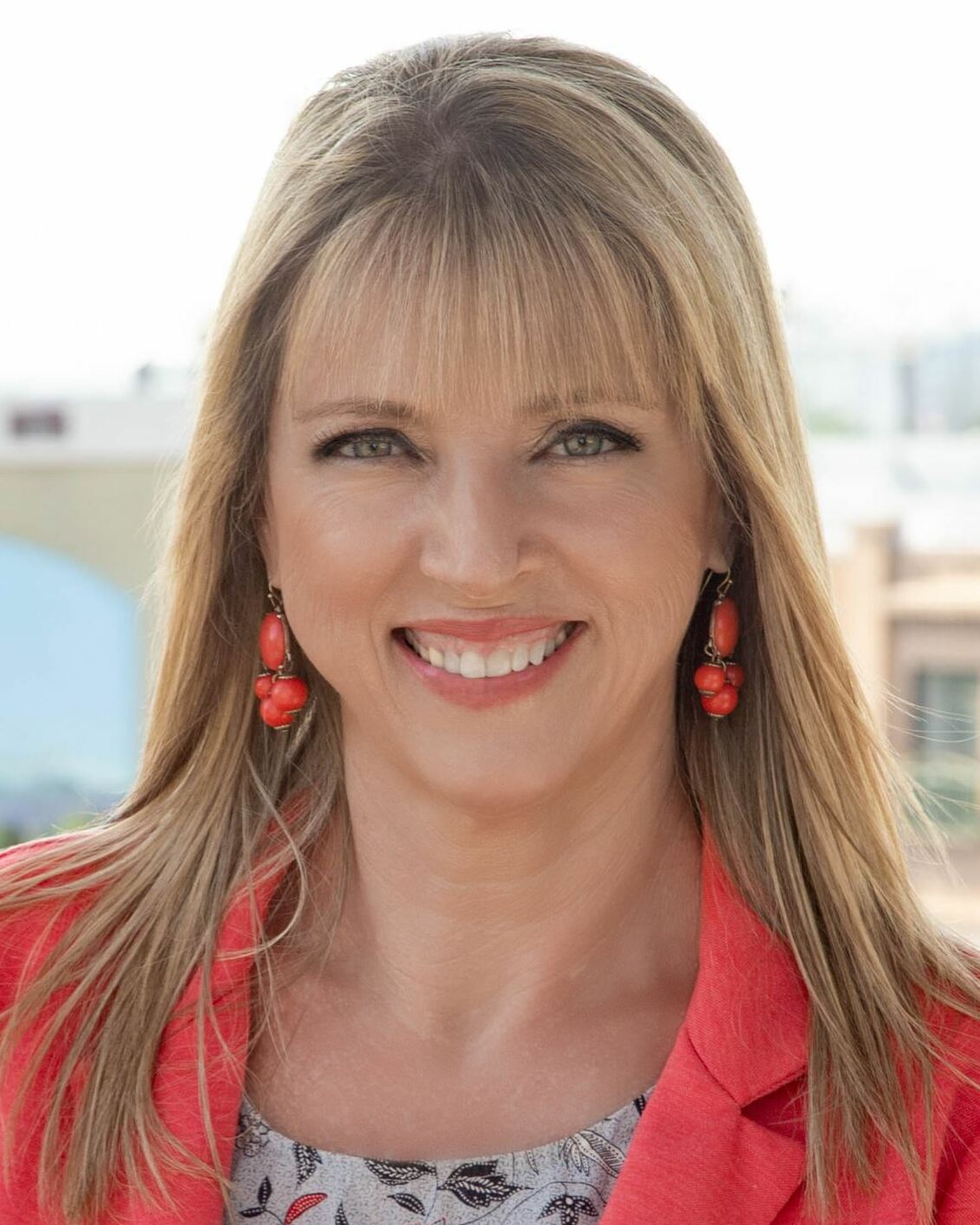
| Nominee | Tom Umberg | Rhonda Shader |
| Party | Democratic | Republican |
| Popular vote | 96,419 | 67,633 |
| Percentage | 58.8% | 41.2% |
Senator before election
Tom Umberg
Democratic
Elected Senator
Tom Umberg
Democratic

The 34th district is based in northern Orange County, including most of Santa Ana, Anaheim, Placentia, Fullerton, Buena Park, La Habra, and the west side of Orange, along with the unincorporated community of South Whittier in Los Angeles County. The incumbent was first-term Democrat Tom Umberg of Santa Ana, who sought re-election.

=== Candidates ===
==== Declared ====
- Rhonda Shader (Republican), mayor of Placentia
- Tom Umberg (Democratic), incumbent state senator

=== Endorsements ===
Rhonda Shader (R)

Organizations

- California Republican Party
Tom Umberg (D)

Organizations

- California Democratic Party
- California Teachers Association
- Equality California
- SEIU United Healthcare Workers West

=== Results ===
California's 34th State Senate district, 2022
Primary election
| Party | Candidate | Votes | % |
|---|---|---|---|
| Democratic | Tom Umberg (incumbent) | 55,525 | 58.3 |
| Republican | Rhonda Shader | 39,728 | 41.7 |
| Total votes | | 95,253 | 100% |
General election
| Democratic | Tom Umberg (incumbent) | 96,419 | 58.8 |
| Republican | Rhonda Shader | 67,633 | 41.2 |
| Total votes | | 164,052 | 100% |
| Democratic hold | | | |

== District 36 ==
District 36
- November 8, 2022

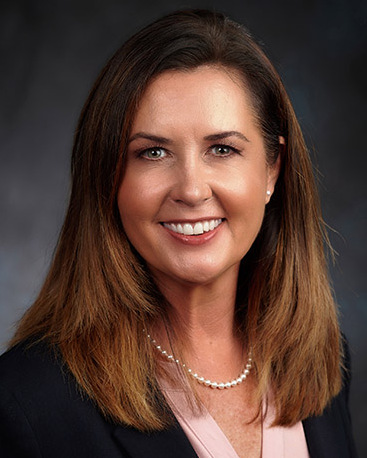
| Nominee | Janet Nguyen | Kim Carr |
| Party | Republican | Democratic |
| Popular vote | 196,488 | 149,114 |
| Percentage | 56.9% | 43.1% |
Senator before election
None (New Seat)
Elected Senator
Janet Nguyen
Republican

The new 36th district encompasses most of coastal Orange County, including Seal Beach, Huntington Beach, Newport Beach, Emerald Bay, Laguna Beach, and Dana Point, and the Little Saigon area of northwestern Orange County, including Garden Grove, Westminster, Fountain Valley, Midway City, Stanton, Cypress, Rossmoor, and Los Alimitos, along with Artesia, Cerritos, and Hawaiian Gardens in southwestern Los Angeles County. The seat had no incumbent.

=== Candidates ===
==== Declared ====
- Kim Carr (Democratic), Huntington Beach city councilor
- Janet Nguyen (Republican), state assemblywoman from the 72nd district and former state senator from the 34th district

=== Endorsements ===
Kim Carr (D)

Organizations

- California Democratic Party
- California Teachers Association
- Equality California
Janet Nguyen (R)

Organizations

- California Republican Party

=== Results ===
California's 36th State Senate district, 2022
Primary election
| Party | Candidate | Votes | % |
|---|---|---|---|
| Republican | Janet Nguyen | 125,053 | 56.7 |
| Democratic | Kim Carr | 95,655 | 43.3 |
| Total votes | | 220,708 | 100% |
General election
| Republican | Janet Nguyen | 196,488 | 56.9 |
| Democratic | Kim Carr | 149,114 | 43.1 |
| Total votes | | 345,602 | 100% |
| Republican win (new seat) | | | |

== District 38 ==
District 38
- November 8, 2022
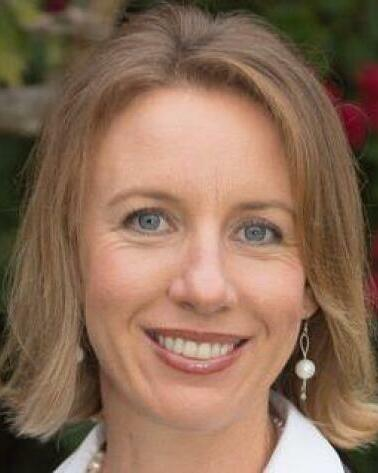

| Nominee | Catherine Blakespear | Matt Gunderson |
| Party | Democratic | Republican |
| Popular vote | 190,992 | 174,581 |
| Percentage | 52.2% | 47.8% |
Senator before election
Patricia Bates
Republican
Elected Senator
Catherine Blakespear
Democratic

The new 38th district encompasses the coastal North County San Diego County communities of La Jolla, Del Mar, Solana Beach, Cardiff, Rancho Santa Fe, Encinitas, Carlsbad, Vista, Oceanside, San Luis Rey, and Camp Pendleton Marine Corps Base, along with the southern edge of Orange County, including San Clemente, San Juan Capistrano, Ladera Ranch, Las Flores, and Rancho Santa Margarita. The incumbent in this area, Republican Patricia Bates (R–Laguna Niguel), was term-limited and could not seek re-election.

=== Candidates ===
==== Declared ====
- Catherine Blakespear (Democratic), mayor of Encinitas and chair of the San Diego Association of Governments
- Matt Gunderson (Republican), automobile dealer
- Joe Kerr (Democratic), retired Orange County fire captain

==== Withdrawn ====
- Priya Bhat-Patel (Democratic), Carlsbad city councilor

==== Declined ====
- Lisa Bartlett (Republican), Orange County supervisor (running for U.S. House)
- Bill Brough (Republican), former state assemblyman from the 73rd district

=== Endorsements ===
Catherine Blakespear (D)

Organizations

- California Democratic Party
- Equality California
- NARAL Pro-Choice California
- SEIU United Healthcare Workers West
Matt Gunderson (R)

Organizations

- California Republican Party

=== Results ===
California's 38th State Senate district, 2022
Primary election
| Party | Candidate | Votes | % |
|---|---|---|---|
| Republican | Matt Gunderson | 106,358 | 45.9 |
| Democratic | Catherine Blakespear | 99,583 | 42.9 |
| Democratic | Joe Kerr | 25,908 | 11.2 |
| Total votes | | 231,849 | 100% |
General election
| Democratic | Catherine Blakespear | 190,992 | 52.2 |
| Republican | Matt Gunderson | 174,581 | 47.8 |
| Total votes | | 365,573 | 100% |
| Democratic gain from Republican | | | |

== District 40 ==
District 40
- November 8, 2022
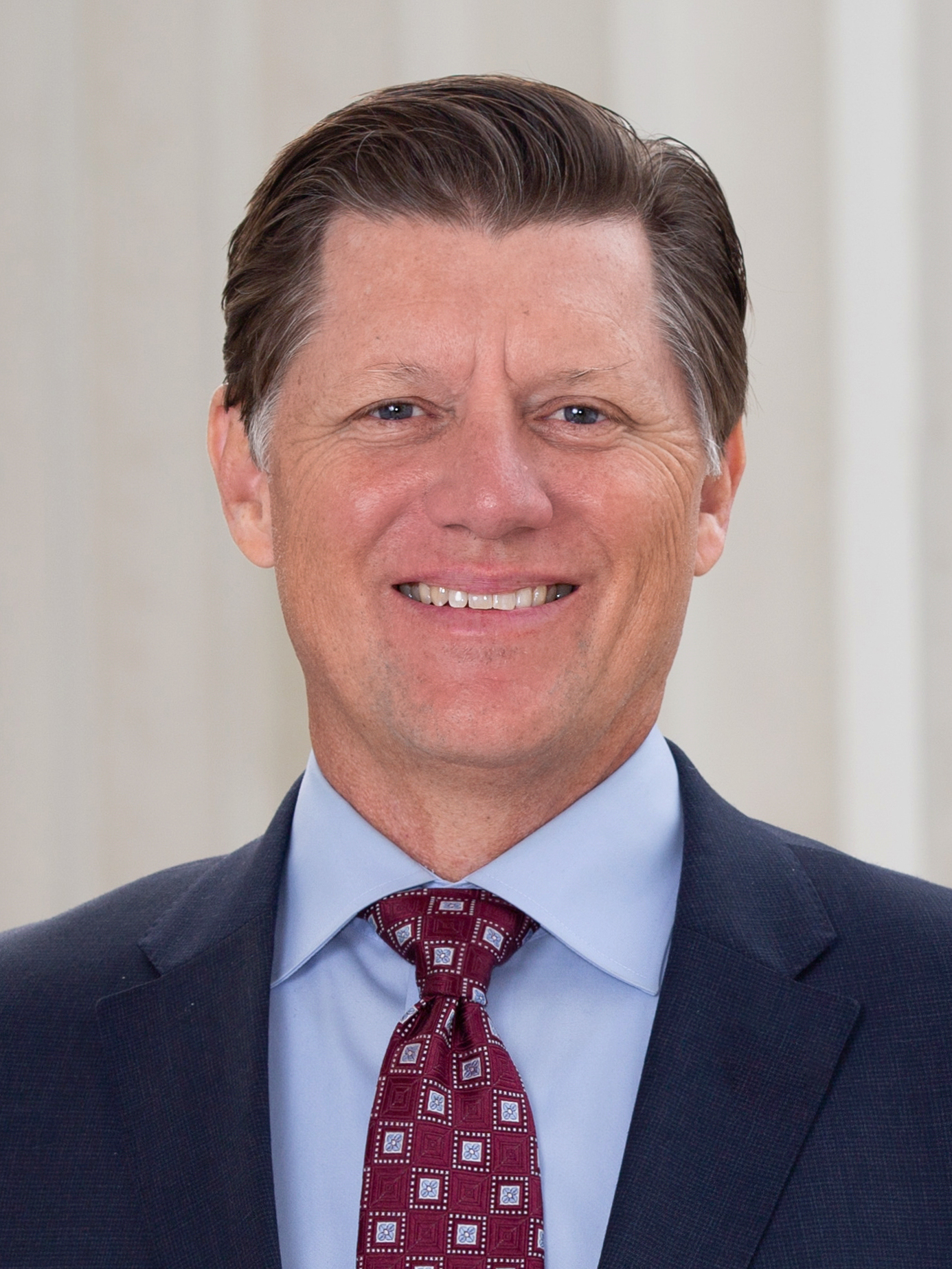

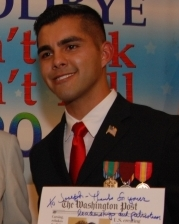
| Nominee | Brian Jones | Joseph Rocha |
| Party | Republican | Democratic |
| Popular vote | 170,109 | 149,948 |
| Percentage | 53.1% | 46.9% |
Senator before election
Brian Jones
Republican
Elected Senator
Brian Jones
Republican

The new 40th district encompasses much of inland San Diego County, including Santee, Poway, Alpine, Pine Valley, Ramona, San Marcos, Escondido, Hidden Meadows, Valley Center, Pauma Valley, and Fallbrook, as well as the northeastern parts of the city of San Diego. The incumbent in this area was Republican Brian Jones of Santee and the former 38th district, who sought re-election.

=== Candidates ===
==== Declared ====
- Brian Jones (Republican), incumbent state senator
- Joseph Rocha (Democratic), attorney

=== Endorsements ===
Brian Jones (R)

Organizations

- California Republican Party
Joseph Rocha (D)

Organizations

- California Democratic Party
- Equality California
- LGBTQ Victory Fund
- NARAL Pro-Choice California
- SEIU United Healthcare Workers West
- VoteVets.org

=== Results ===
California's 40th State Senate district, 2022
Primary election
| Party | Candidate | Votes | % |
|---|---|---|---|
| Republican | Brian Jones (incumbent) | 113,400 | 54.4 |
| Democratic | Joseph Rocha | 94,960 | 45.6 |
| Total votes | | 208,360 | 100% |
General election
| Republican | Brian Jones (incumbent) | 170,109 | 53.1 |
| Democratic | Joseph Rocha | 149,948 | 46.9 |
| Total votes | | 320,057 | 100% |
| Republican hold | | | |

== See also ==
- 2022 United States elections
  - 2022 United States Senate election in California
  - 2022 United States House of Representatives elections in California
- 2022 California elections
  - 2022 California gubernatorial election
  - 2022 California State Assembly election
