= Catherine Blakespear =

American politician (born 1976)

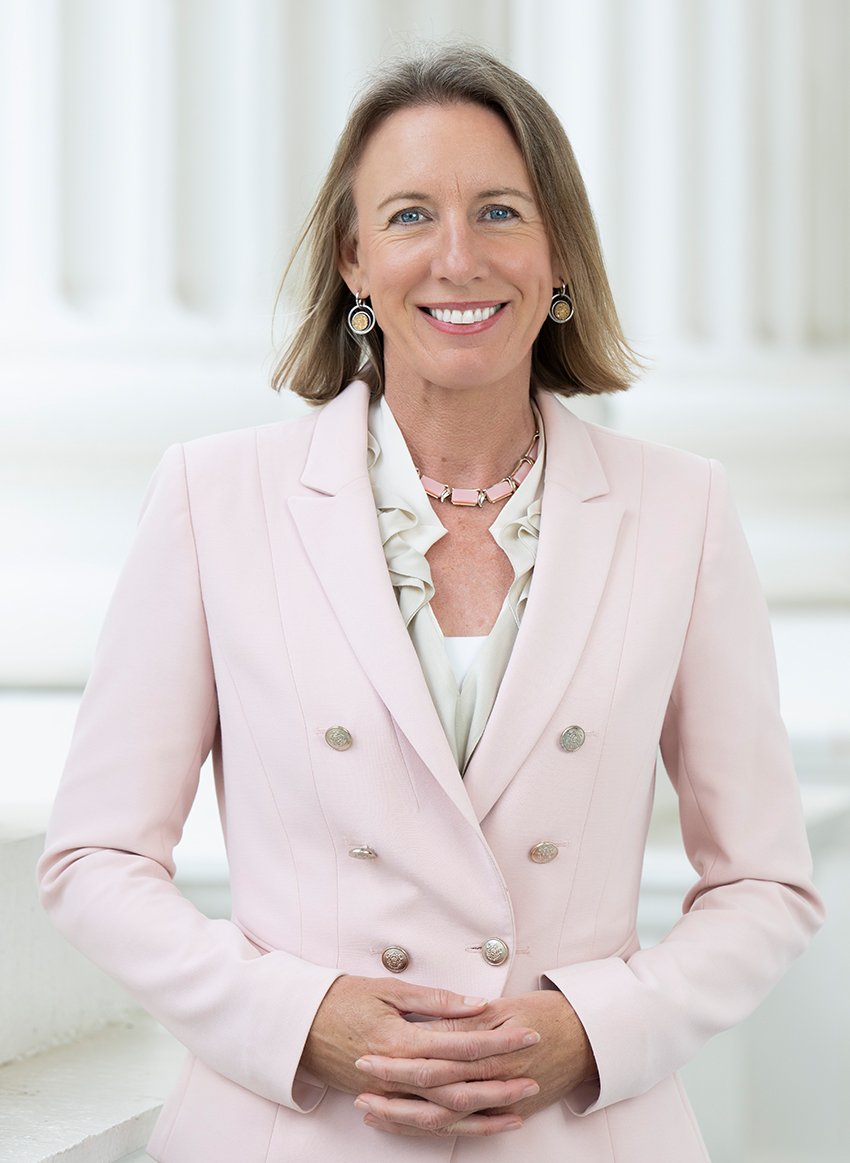
- Official portrait, 2025

Member of the California State Senate from the 38th district
- Incumbent
- Assumed office December 5, 2022
- Preceded by: Brian Jones

Mayor of Encinitas
- In office February 8, 2016 – December 3, 2022
- Preceded by: Kristin Gaspar
- Succeeded by: Tony Kranz

Encinitas City Council
- In office 2014–2016

Personal details
- Born: Catherine Blakespear; February 29, 1976 (age 50) Cardiff-by-the-Sea, California, U.S.
- Party: Democratic
- Spouse: Jeremy Spearman
- Children: 2
- Education: Northwestern University (BS, MS); University of Utah (JD)
- Website: sd38.senate.ca.gov

Catherine Smith Blakespear (née Blake; born February 29, 1976) is an American politician and former journalist who is currently serving in the California State Senate. She is a Democrat representing the 38th Senate District, which encompasses parts of Northern San Diego County and Southern Orange County.

== Early life and education ==
Blakespear was born on February 29, 1976, in Cardiff-by-the-Sea, Encinitas, California. She graduated from Torrey Pines High School in 1994 and graduated in 1999 from Northwestern University in Chicago where she earned a Bachelor of Science and Master of Science degree in journalism. In 2006, she received her Juris Doctor from the University of Utah S.J. Quinney College of Law.

== Career ==
After graduating from Northwestern, she worked as a journalist for the Los Angeles Times and the Associated Press.

Prior to her time in elected office, she was a real estate attorney and worked as the traffic commissioner for the City of Encinitas.

=== Politics ===
Before being elected to the State Senate, Blakespear served two years on the Encinitas City Council starting in 2014, followed by six years as mayor from December 2016 to November 2022. While mayor, she served as chair of SANDAG.

== California State Senate ==
Catherine Blakespear is a member of the California State Senate, representing District 38. She assumed office on December 5, 2022, and her current term ends on December 7, 2026. Blakespear appointed Jack Christensen as her chief of staff in 2023, a former SANDAG government relations officer.

== Personal life ==
Blakespear's family has lived in the Encinitas area for nearly a century. Catherine met her husband while reporting on the Salt Lake City Olympics. Catherine and husband Jeremy reside in Encinitas. They have 2 children.

== Electoral history ==
2014 Encinitas City Council election
Party	Candidate	Votes	%
Nonpartisan	Catherine Blakespear	6,588	39.4
Nonpartisan	Alan Lerchbacker	5,290	31.6
Nonpartisan	Julie Graboi	3,382	20.2
Nonpartisan	Bryan M. Ziegler	1,430	8.6
Total votes		16,690	100.0

2016 Encinitas mayoral election
Party	Candidate	Votes	%
Nonpartisan	Catherine Blakespear	21,083	67.2
Nonpartisan	Paul Gasper	10,270	32.8
Total votes		31,353	100.0

2018 Encinitas mayoral election
Party	Candidate	Votes	%
Nonpartisan	Catherine Blakespear	24,851	83.68
Nonpartisan	John Paul Elliott	4,845	16.32
Total votes		29,696	100.0

2020 Encinitas mayoral election
Party	Candidate	Votes	%
Nonpartisan	Catherine Blakespear	20,973	55.02
Nonpartisan	Jule Thunder	17,144	44.98
Total votes		38,117	100.0

2022 California State Senate, District 38 election
Primary election
Party	Candidate	Votes	%
Republican	Matt Gunderson	106,358	45.9
Democratic	Catherine Blakespear	99,583	43.0
Democratic	Joe Kerr	25,908	11.2
Total votes		231,849	100.0
General election
Democratic	Catherine Blakespear	190,992	52.2
Republican	Matt Gunderson	174,581	47.8
Total votes		365,573	100.0
Democratic gain from Republican			
