= Gideon S. Case =

American soldier and politician

Member of the California State Assembly from the 67th district
- In office January 7, 1907 - January 4, 1909
- Preceded by: John A. Goodrich
- Succeeded by: Harvey G. Cattell

Personal details
- Born: June 13, 1847 Chagrin Falls, Ohio, US
- Died: February 6, 1931 (aged 83) Modesto, California, US
- Party: Republican

Military service
- Branch/service: United States Army
- Battles/wars: American Civil War

Gideon S. Case (June 13, 1847 - February 6, 1931) was an American soldier and politician who served in the California State Assembly for the 67th district from 1907 to 1909.

During the American Civil War, Case served in the Union Army.
