= Kelly Seyarto =

American firefighter and politician from California

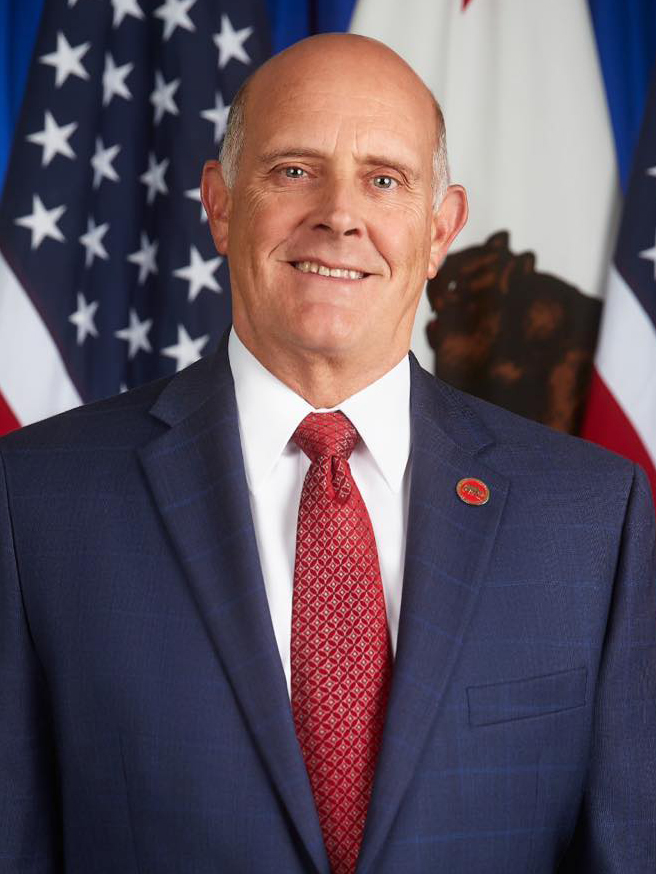
- Official portrait, 2022

Member of the California State Senate from the 32nd district
- Incumbent
- Assumed office December 5, 2022
- Preceded by: Melissa Melendez

Member of the California State Assembly from the 67th district
- In office December 7, 2020 – December 5, 2022
- Preceded by: Melissa Melendez
- Succeeded by: Kate Sanchez

Personal details
- Born: Dennis Kelly Seyarto; October 28, 1962 (age 64) La Puente, California, U.S.
- Party: Republican
- Spouse: Denise Esprabens (m. 1987)
- Children: 3
- Education: Mt. San Antonio College (AS); California State University, Los Angeles (BS); California State University, Long Beach (MPA)

Dennis Kelly Seyarto (born October 28, 1962) is an American politician serving as the State Senator from the 32nd State Senatorial district. He also served as a member of the California State Assembly from the 67th district from 2020 until his election to the California State Senate in 2022. Seyarto is a former mayor of Murrieta, California.

== Early life and education ==
On January 21, 1962, Seyarto was born in La Puente, California. Seyarto grew up in Baldwin Park, California and La Verne, California. In 1981, Seyarto earned an associate degree in fire science from Mt. San Antonio College. In 1989, Seyarto earned a Bachelor of Science degree in fire protection administration and technology from California State University, Los Angeles. In 1996, Seyarto earned a Master of Public Administration degree from California State University, Long Beach.

== Career ==
In 1981, Seyarto began his career as a paid reserve firefighter in the La Verne Fire Department. In 1983, Seyarto joined the Inglewood Fire Department, which was incorporated into the Los Angeles County Fire Department in 2000. In 2015, after 35 years, Seyarto retired with the rank of battalion chief from Los Angeles County Fire Department.

In 1997, Seyarto was elected to the Murrieta City Council. He served until 2006 and again starting in 2016. During his tenure, Seyarto was selected to serve as the mayor of Murrieta in 2000, 2003, 2006, and 2019.

In the 2020 nonpartisan blanket primary for California's 67th State Assembly district, Seyarto placed second in a field of five candidates. On November 3, 2020, Seyarto won the election and became a Republican member of the California State Assembly for District 67. Seyarto defeated lawyer Jerry Carlos with 60.02% of the votes. Seyarto's term began on December 7, 2020.

On January 3, 2022, Seyarto announced that he would be a candidate for the California State Senate to succeed incumbent Melissa Melendez, who was ineligible to seek reelection due to term limits.

== Awards ==
- 2020 Outstanding Public Service Award. Presented by Riverside Division of the League of California Cities.

== Personal life ==
Seyarto and his wife, Denise Seyarto, have three daughters. Seyarto and his family live in Murrieta, California.

== Electoral history ==
2020 California State Assembly 67th district election
Primary election
Party	Candidate	Votes	%
Democratic	Jerry Carlos	40,112	35.4
Republican	Kelly Seyarto	31,067	27.4
Republican	Jeremy Smith	19,439	17.2
Republican	Steve Manos	16,111	14.2
Republican	Nick Pardue	6,520	5.8
Total votes		113,249	100.0
General election
Republican	Kelly Seyarto	144,396	60.0
Democratic	Jerry Carlos	96,180	40.0
Total votes		240,576	100.0
Republican hold			

2022 California State Senate 32nd district election
Primary election
Party	Candidate	Votes	%
Republican	Kelly Seyarto	112,728	62.8
Democratic	Brian Nash	66,644	37.2
Total votes		179,372	100.0
General election
Republican	Kelly Seyarto	184,086	62.0
Democratic	Brian Nash	112,763	38.0
Total votes		296,849	100.0
Republican gain from Democratic			
