= Melissa Melendez =

American politician (born 1968)

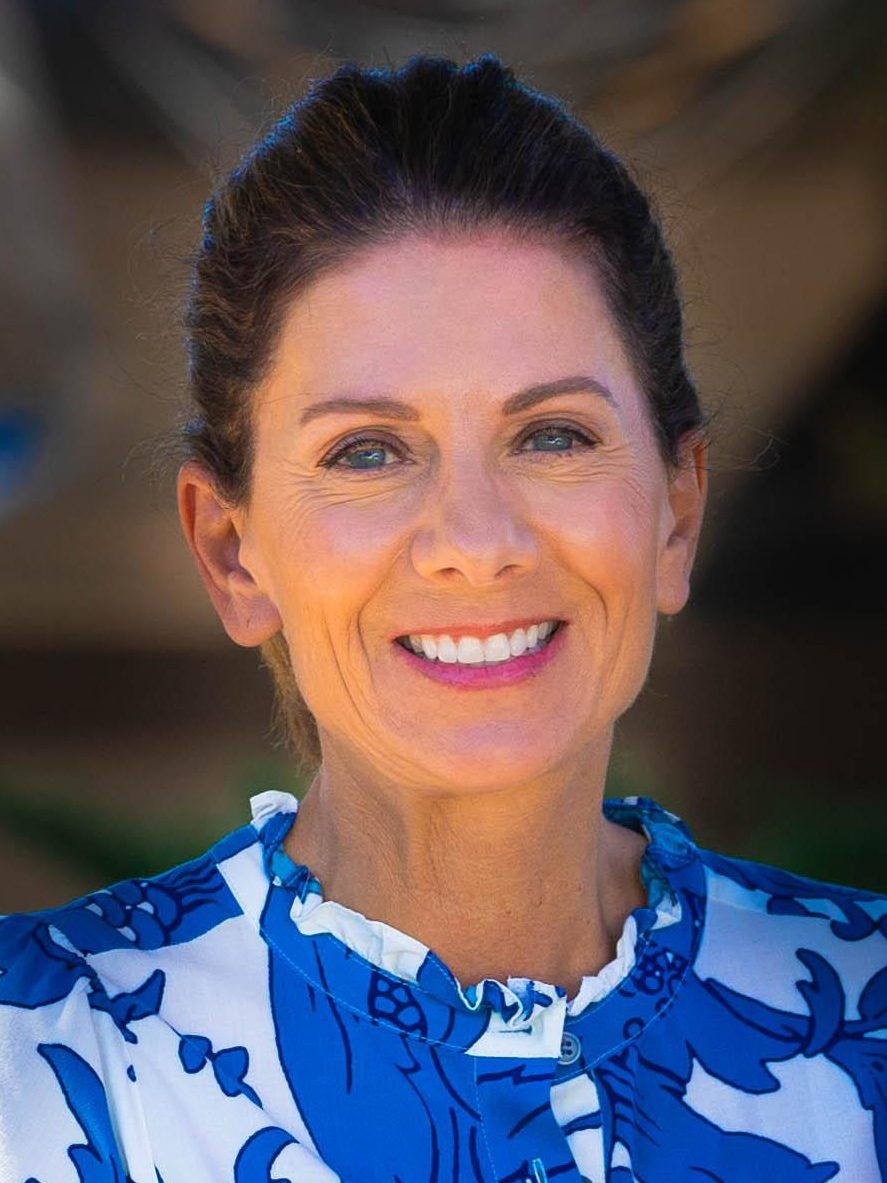
- Melendez in 2021

Member of the California State Senate from the 28th district
- In office May 18, 2020 – December 5, 2022
- Preceded by: Jeff Stone
- Succeeded by: Lola Smallwood-Cuevas (redistricted)

Member of the California State Assembly from the 67th district
- In office December 3, 2012 – May 18, 2020
- Preceded by: Jim Silva (redistricted)
- Succeeded by: Kelly Seyarto

Personal details
- Born: Melissa Ann Schneider; February 17, 1968 (age 58) Youngstown, Ohio, U.S.
- Party: Republican
- Spouse: Nico Melendez
- Children: 5
- Education: Chaminade University (BA); University of Phoenix (MBA)

Military service
- Allegiance: United States
- Branch/service: United States Navy
- Battles/wars: Persian Gulf War

Melissa Ann Melendez (née Schneider; born February 17, 1968) is an American politician who served in the California State Senate. A Republican, she represented the 28th District from 2012 to 2022, which encompassed large portions of Riverside County. She previously served in the California State Assembly and on the Lake Elsinore City Council.

== Early life ==
Melendez is a native of Youngstown, Ohio. After high school, she enlisted in the United States Navy. She attended the Defense Language Institute in Monterey, California, where she learned Russian.

While serving in the Navy, Melendez also attended college in the evenings, and received her BA in History and Political Studies from the Chaminade University of Honolulu in Honolulu, Hawaii.

== Career ==
Melendez was one of the first women to fly aboard EP-3 aircraft overseas. She was a Russian language translator for ten years, and was part of flight missions during Operation Desert Shield and Desert Storm.

After the Navy, Melendez worked at Chaminade University for two years before deciding to establish her own business. She then formed a transcription company, contracting with the Navy. Melendez earned her MBA from the University of Phoenix in June 2008. In 2008, Melendez was elected to the Lake Elsinore City Council. She served as Mayor Pro Tem as well as Mayor during her four years in local government.

After incumbent State Senator Jeff Stone announced his resignation to work as a regional director at the U.S. Department of Labor, a special election was ordered to fill his vacant seat. After advancing in the March 3, 2020, special election, Melendez won the runoff election held on May 12 over the Democratic nominee, Riverside County School Board Trustee Elizabeth Romero and was sworn into the Senate on May 18.

The day after the 2020 United States presidential election, prior to a winner being declared, she claimed that Democrats were attempting to steal the election.

== Electoral history ==
=== 2020 California State Senate ===
California's 28th State Senate district special election, 2020
Primary election
| Party | Candidate | Votes | % |
|---|---|---|---|
| Republican | Melissa Melendez | 81,918 | 40.5 |
| Democratic | Elizabeth Romero | 47,516 | 23.5 |
| Democratic | Joy Silver | 42,222 | 20.9 |
| Republican | John Schwab | 24,536 | 12.1 |
| Democratic | Anna Nevenic | 5,912 | 2.9 |
| Total votes | | 202,104 | 100.0 |
General election
| Republican | Melissa Melendez | 105,525 | 55.4 |
| Democratic | Elizabeth Romero | 84,902 | 44.6 |
| Total votes | | 190,427 | 100.0 |

=== 2018 California State Assembly ===
California's 67th State Assembly district election, 2018
Primary election
| Party | Candidate | Votes | % |
|---|---|---|---|
| Republican | Melissa Melendez (incumbent) | 54,089 | 67.1 |
| Democratic | Michelle Singleton | 26,474 | 32.9 |
| Total votes | | 80,563 | 100.0 |
General election
| Republican | Melissa Melendez (incumbent) | 93,519 | 60.9 |
| Democratic | Michelle Singleton | 60,015 | 39.1 |
| Total votes | | 153,534 | 100.0 |
| Republican hold | | | |

=== 2016 California State Assembly ===
California's 67th State Assembly district election, 2016
Primary election
| Party | Candidate | Votes | % |
|---|---|---|---|
| Republican | Melissa Melendez (incumbent) | 51,987 | 63.5 |
| Democratic | Jorge Lopez | 29,924 | 36.5 |
| Total votes | | 81,911 | 100.0 |
General election
| Republican | Melissa Melendez (incumbent) | 107,654 | 63.8 |
| Democratic | Jorge Lopez | 60,996 | 36.2 |
| Total votes | | 168,650 | 100.0 |
| Republican hold | | | |

=== 2014 California State Assembly ===
California's 67th State Assembly district election, 2014
Primary election
| Party | Candidate | Votes | % |
|---|---|---|---|
| Republican | Melissa Melendez (incumbent) | 32,268 | 99.8 |
| Democratic | Conrad Melton (write-in) | 58 | 0.2 |
| Total votes | | 32,326 | 100.0 |
General election
| Republican | Melissa Melendez (incumbent) | 54,018 | 68.9 |
| Democratic | Conrad Melton | 24,386 | 31.1 |
| Total votes | | 78,404 | 100.0 |
| Republican hold | | | |

=== 2012 California State Assembly ===
California's 67th State Assembly district election, 2012
Primary election
| Party | Candidate | Votes | % |
|---|---|---|---|
| Republican | Phil Paule | 11,951 | 27.7 |
| Republican | Melissa Melendez | 10,084 | 23.3 |
| Republican | Bob Magee | 8,672 | 20.1 |
| Republican | Kenneth C. Dickson | 8,216 | 19.0 |
| Republican | William T. Akana | 4,291 | 9.9 |
| Total votes | | 43,214 | 100.0 |
General election
| Republican | Melissa Melendez | 67,232 | 52.3 |
| Republican | Phil Paule | 61,230 | 47.7 |
| Total votes | | 128,462 | 100.0 |
| Republican hold | | | |
