= Connie Leyva =

American politician

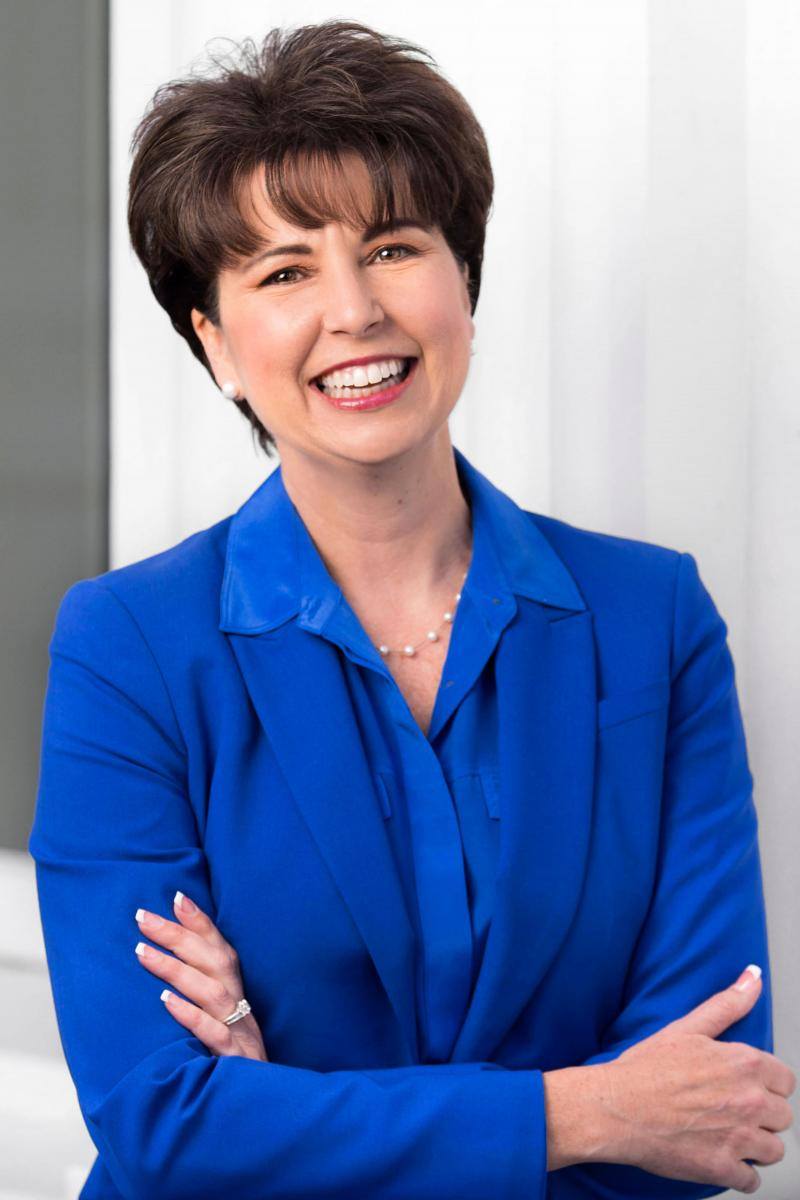

Member of the California State Senate from the 20th district
- In office December 1, 2014 – December 5, 2022
- Preceded by: Alex Padilla (redistricted)
- Succeeded by: Caroline Menjivar

President of the California Labor Federation
- In office 2004–2015
- Preceded by: Tom Rankin
- Succeeded by: Kathryn Lybarger

Personal details
- Born: Connie Marie Thedford; February 19, 1967 (age 59)
- Party: Democratic
- Spouse: Albert Leyva
- Children: 2
- Education: University of Redlands (BA)
- Profession: Labor organizer

Connie Leyva (born February 19, 1967) is a former American politician and union organizer, who now serves as the Executive Director of public radio and television station KVCR. She previously served as a member of the California State Senate in the 20th Senate District from 2014-2022. She is a member of the Democratic Party.

Leyva was raised in Chino, California, where she attended public schools. She earned a Bachelor of Arts degree in communicative disorders from the University of Redlands.

== Career ==
Prior to being elected to the State Senate in 2014, she was president of the California Labor Federation. Leyva was elected to the California State Senate in 2014, receiving the endorsement of the local AFL–CIO chapter.

In 2015, Leyva opposed legislation to end personal belief exemptions for mandatory vaccinations for students in California public schools.

On January 6, 2022, Leyva announced that she would not run for reelection to the State Senate as newly approved redistricting maps put state Sen. Connie Leyva (D-Chino) in the same district as state Sen. Susan Rubio (D-Baldwin Park) and the two would have had to face off in the fall. On January 26, 2022, Leyva announced that she would be a candidate for the San Bernardino County Board of Supervisors, seeking to unseat Curt Hagman. She was defeated by a wide margin.

In late October, 2022, the San Bernardino Community College District announced appointing Leyva as executive director of KVCR. KVCR is a public radio dual licensee that also operates First Nations Experience, a digital multicast channel for Native American and Indigenous programming.

== Personal life ==
Leyva and her husband, Al, live in Chino, California and have twin daughters.
