= California's 67th State Assembly district =

American legislative district

Current assemblymember
Sharon Quirk-Silva; D–Fullerton
- Population (2010) • Voting age • Citizen voting age: 462,769; 328,809; 252,809
- Demographics: 50.85% White; 5.25% Black; 34.68% Latino; 7.06% Asian; 0.90% Native American; 0.42% Hawaiian/Pacific Islander; 0.23% other; 0.62% remainder of multiracial
- Registered voters: 273,544
- Registration: 40.05% Republican; 31.42% Democratic; 21.72% No party preference

California's 67th State Assembly district is one of 80 California State Assembly districts. It is currently represented by Democrat Sharon Quirk-Silva of Fullerton.

== District profile ==
The district primarily encompasses parts of north Orange County and southeastern Los Angeles County anchored by the cities of Anaheim and Cerritos. The district is primarily suburban and ethnically and socioeconomically diverse.

Orange County –

- Anaheim – (partial)
- Buena Park
- Cypress
- La Palma
- Fullerton (partial)

Los Angeles County –

- Artesia
- Cerritos
- Hawaiian Gardens

== Election results from statewide races ==
Year	Office	Results
2021	Recall	Yes 61.9 – 38.1%
2020	President	Trump 54.4 – 43.6%
2018	Governor	Cox 61.1 – 38.9%
2018	Senator	De Leon 52.3 – 47.7%
2016	President	Trump 55.9 – 38.9%
2016	Senator	Harris 54.2 – 45.8%
2014	Governor	Kashkari 63.9 – 36.1%
2012	President	Romney 58.3 – 39.6%
2012	Senator	Emken 58.3 – 41.7%

== List of assembly members representing the district ==
Due to redistricting, the 67th district has been moved around different parts of the state. The current iteration resulted from the 2021 redistricting by the California Citizens Redistricting Commission.

Assembly members	Party	Years served	Counties represented	Notes
George G. Goucher	Democratic	January 5, 1885 – January 3, 1887	Mariposa, Merced	
John W. Bost	Democratic	January 3, 1887 – January 7, 1889	Mariposa, Merced	
William M. Rundell	Democratic	January 7, 1889 – January 5, 1891	Mariposa, Merced	
Frank H. Gould	Democratic	January 5, 1891 – January 2, 1893	Mariposa, Merced	
Charles A. Barlow	People's	January 2, 1893 – January 7, 1895	San Luis Obispo	
J. H. Glass	Republican	January 7, 1895 – January 4, 1897	San Luis Obispo	
James K. Burnett	Democratic	January 4, 1897 – January 1, 1901	San Luis Obispo	
Warren M. John	Republican	January 1, 1901 – January 5, 1903	San Luis Obispo	
John A. Goodrich	Republican	January 5, 1903 – January 7, 1907	Los Angeles	
Gideon S. Case	Republican	January 7, 1907 – January 4, 1909	Los Angeles	
Harvey G. Cattell	Republican	January 4, 1909 – January 6, 1913	Los Angeles	
Howard J. Fish	Republican	January 6, 1913 – January 8, 1917	Los Angeles	Ran as a Progressive for his 2nd term.
Howard J. Fish	Progressive	January 6, 1913 – January 8, 1917	Los Angeles	Ran as a Progressive for his 2nd term.
Anson Burlingame Johnson	Republican	January 8, 1917 – January 6, 1919	Los Angeles	
Franklin D. Mather	Republican	January 6, 1919 – January 8, 1923	Los Angeles	
Eleanor Miller	Republican	January 8, 1923 – January 5, 1931	Los Angeles	
George F. Gillette	Republican	January 5, 1931 – January 2, 1933	Los Angeles	
Cecil R. King	Democratic	January 2, 1933 – January 7, 1935	Los Angeles	
Lee E. Geyer	Democratic	January 7, 1935 – January 4, 1937	Los Angeles	
Cecil R. King	Democratic	January 4, 1937 – August 25, 1942	Los Angeles	Ran for Congress for the 17th congressional district.
Vacant		August 25, 1942 – January 4, 1943	Los Angeles	
Clayton A. Dills	Democratic	January 4, 1943 – January 2, 1967	Los Angeles	
Larry Townsend	Democratic	January 2, 1967 – March 5, 1973	Los Angeles	Died in office. Died from a heart attack.
Vacant		March 5, 1973 – June 28, 1973	Los Angeles	
Paul Bannai	Republican	June 28, 1973 – November 30, 1974	Los Angeles	Sworn in after winning special election.
Jerry Lewis	Republican	December 2, 1974 – November 30, 1978	Riverside, San Bernardino	
Bill Leonard	Republican	December 4, 1978 – November 30, 1982	Riverside, San Bernardino	
John Lewis	Republican	December 6, 1982 – May 16, 1991	Orange	Resigned from office to be sworn in the 35th State Senate district after winning special election.
Vacant		May 16, 1991 – September 18, 1991	Orange	
Mickey Conroy	Republican	September 18, 1991 – November 30, 1992	Orange	Sworn in after winning special election.
Doris Allen	Republican	December 7, 1992 – November 28, 1995	Orange	Got recalled from the State Assembly.
Vacant		November 28, 1995 – November 29, 1995	Orange	
Scott Baugh	Republican	November 29, 1995 – November 30, 2000	Orange	Sworn in after winning special election to fill a seat left by his predecessor when she got recalled.
Tom Harman	Republican	December 4, 2000 – June 12, 2006	Orange	Resigned to be sworn in the 35th State Senate district after winning special election.
Vacant		June 12, 2006 – December 4, 2006	Orange	
Jim Silva	Republican	December 4, 2006 – November 30, 2012	Orange	
Melissa Melendez	Republican	December 3, 2012 – May 18, 2020	Riverside	Resigned to be sworn in to the 28th State Senate district after winning special election.
Vacant		May 18, 2020 – December 7, 2020	Riverside	
Kelly Seyarto	Republican	December 7, 2020 – November 30, 2022	Riverside	
Sharon Quirk-Silva	Democrat	December 5, 2022 – present	Los Angeles, Orange	

== Election results (1990–present) ==
=== 2024 ===
2024 California State Assembly 67th district election
Primary election
Party	Candidate	Votes	%
Democratic	Sharon Quirk-Silva (incumbent)	35,828	52.4
Republican	Elizabeth Culver	28,010	41.0
No party preference	Jacob Woo Ho Lee	4,516	6.6
Total votes		68,354	100.0
General election
Democratic	Sharon Quirk-Silva (incumbent)	93,701	56.8
Republican	Elizabeth Culver	71,161	43.2
Total votes		164,862	100.0
Democratic hold			

=== 2022 ===
2022 California State Assembly 67th district election
Primary election
Party	Candidate	Votes	%
Democratic	Sharon Quirk-Silva (incumbent)	30,873	47.7
Republican	Soo Yoo	25,005	38.6
Democratic	Param Brar	4,800	7.4
Republican	Sou Moua	4,076	6.3
Total votes		80,563	100.0
General election
Democratic	Sharon Quirk-Silva (incumbent)	58,781	53.3
Republican	Soo Yoo	51,441	46.7
Total votes		110,222	100.0
Democratic gain from Republican			

=== 2020 ===
2020 California State Assembly 67th district election
Primary election
Party	Candidate	Votes	%
Democratic	Jerry Carlos	40,112	35.4
Republican	Kelly Seyarto	31,067	27.4
Republican	Jeremy Smith	19,439	17.2
Republican	Steve Manos	16,111	14.2
Republican	Nick Pardue	6,520	5.8
Total votes		113,249	100.0
General election
Republican	Kelly Seyarto	144,396	60.0
Democratic	Jerry Carlos	96,180	40.0
Total votes		240,576	100.0
Republican hold			

=== 2018 ===
2018 California State Assembly 67th district election
Primary election
Party	Candidate	Votes	%
Republican	Melissa Melendez (incumbent)	54,089	67.1
Democratic	Michelle Singleton	26,474	32.9
Total votes		80,563	100.0
General election
Republican	Melissa Melendez (incumbent)	93,519	60.9
Democratic	Michelle Singleton	60,005	39.1
Total votes		153,524	100.0
Republican hold			

=== 2016 ===
2016 California State Assembly 67th district election
Primary election
Party	Candidate	Votes	%
Republican	Melissa Melendez (incumbent)	51,987	63.5
Democratic	Jorge Lopez	29,924	36.5
Total votes		81,911	100.0
General election
Republican	Melissa Melendez (incumbent)	107,654	63.8
Democratic	Jorge Lopez	60,996	36.2
Total votes		168,650	100.0
Republican hold			

=== 2014 ===
2014 California State Assembly 67th district election
Primary election
Party	Candidate	Votes	%
Republican	Melissa Melendez (incumbent)	32,268	99.8
Democratic	Conrad Melton (write-in)	58	0.2
Total votes		32,326	100.0
General election
Republican	Melissa Melendez (incumbent)	54,018	68.9
Democratic	Conrad Melton	24,386	31.1
Total votes		78,404	100.0
Republican hold			

=== 2012 ===
2012 California State Assembly 67th district election
Primary election
Party	Candidate	Votes	%
Republican	Phil Paule	11,951	27.7
Republican	Melissa Melendez	10,084	23.3
Republican	Bob Magee	8,672	20.1
Republican	Kenneth C. Dickson	8,216	19.0
Republican	William T. Akana	4,291	9.9
Total votes		43,214	100.0
General election
Republican	Melissa Melendez	67,232	52.3
Republican	Phil Paule	61,230	47.7
Total votes		128,462	100.0
Republican hold			

=== 2010 ===
2010 California State Assembly 67th district election
Party	Candidate	Votes	%
Republican	Jim Silva (incumbent)	91,108	66.3
Democratic	Rosalind Freeman	46,435	33.7
Total votes		137,543	100.0
Republican hold			

=== 2008 ===
2008 California State Assembly 67th district election
Party	Candidate	Votes	%
Republican	Jim Silva (incumbent)	108,502	62.3
Democratic	Steve Blount	65,622	37.7
Total votes		174,124	100.0
Republican hold			

=== 2006 ===
2006 California State Assembly 67th district election
Party	Candidate	Votes	%
Republican	Jim Silva	75,001	64.0
Democratic	Ray Roberts	42,103	36.0
Total votes		117,104	100.0
Republican hold			

=== 2004 ===
2004 California State Assembly 67th district election
Party	Candidate	Votes	%
Republican	Tom Harman (incumbent)	107,847	63.9
Democratic	David Silva	50,430	29.9
Libertarian	Norm "Firecracker" Westwell	10,496	6.2
Total votes		168,773	100.0
Republican hold			

=== 2002 ===
2002 California State Assembly 67th district election
Party	Candidate	Votes	%
Republican	Tom Harman (incumbent)	69,420	68.8
Democratic	William R. "Bill" Orton	31,593	31.2
Total votes		101,013	100.0
Republican hold			

=== 2000 ===
2000 California State Assembly 67th district election
Party	Candidate	Votes	%
Republican	Tom Harman	93,752	62.0
Democratic	Andrew M. Hilbert	46,202	30.6
Libertarian	Autumn Browne	11,248	7.4
Total votes		151,202	100.0
Republican hold			

=== 1998 ===
1998 California State Assembly 67th district election
Party	Candidate	Votes	%
Republican	Scott Baugh (incumbent)	66,570	57.5
Democratic	Marie H. Fennell	43,372	37.5
Libertarian	Autumn Browne	5,772	5.0
Total votes		115,714	100.0
Republican hold			

=== 1996 ===
1996 California State Assembly 67th district election
Party	Candidate	Votes	%
Republican	Scott Baugh (incumbent)	80,013	56.3
Democratic	Cliff Brightman	54,085	38.1
Reform	Donald W. Rowe	7,950	5.6
No party	Wayne Dapser (write-in)	14	0.0
Total votes		142,062	100.0
Republican hold			

=== 1995 (recall) ===
1995 California State Assembly 67th district special recall election
Choice	Votes	%
For	34,539	65.19
Against	18,444	34.81
Total	52,983	100.00

1995 California State Assembly 67th district special recall election Successor of Doris Allen if a majority vote in favor of recall
Party	Candidate	Votes	%
Republican	Scott Baugh	22,320	45.3
Democratic	Linda Moulton-Patterson	15,608	31.7
Republican	Don McAllister	5,534	11.2
Republican	Haydee V. Tillotson	3,573	7.2
Republican	Shirley Carey	2,267	4.6
Total votes		49,302	100.0
Republican hold			

=== 1994 ===
1994 California State Assembly 67th district election
Party	Candidate	Votes	%
Republican	Doris Allen (incumbent)	93,952	73.4
Democratic	Jonathan Woolf-Willis	34,074	26.6
Total votes		128,026	100.0
Republican hold			

=== 1992 ===
1992 California State Assembly 67th district election
Party	Candidate	Votes	%
Republican	Doris Allen	95,444	59.2
Democratic	Ken Leblanc	53,187	33.0
Libertarian	Brian Schar	12,556	7.8
Total votes		161,187	100.0
Republican hold			

=== 1991 (special) ===
1991 California State Assembly 67th district special election Vacancy resulting from the resignation of John Lewis
Party	Candidate	Votes	%
Republican	Mickey Conroy	15,254	70.8
Democratic	Gregory Robert Ramsey	6,304	19.2
Total votes		21.558	100.0
Republican hold			

=== 1990 ===
1990 California State Assembly 67th district election
Party	Candidate	Votes	%
Republican	John Lewis (incumbent)	68,861	67.1
Democratic	Fred Smoller	33,821	32.9
Total votes		102,682	100.0
Republican hold			

== See also ==
- California State Assembly
- California State Assembly districts
- Districts in California
