= Lola Smallwood-Cuevas =

American politician

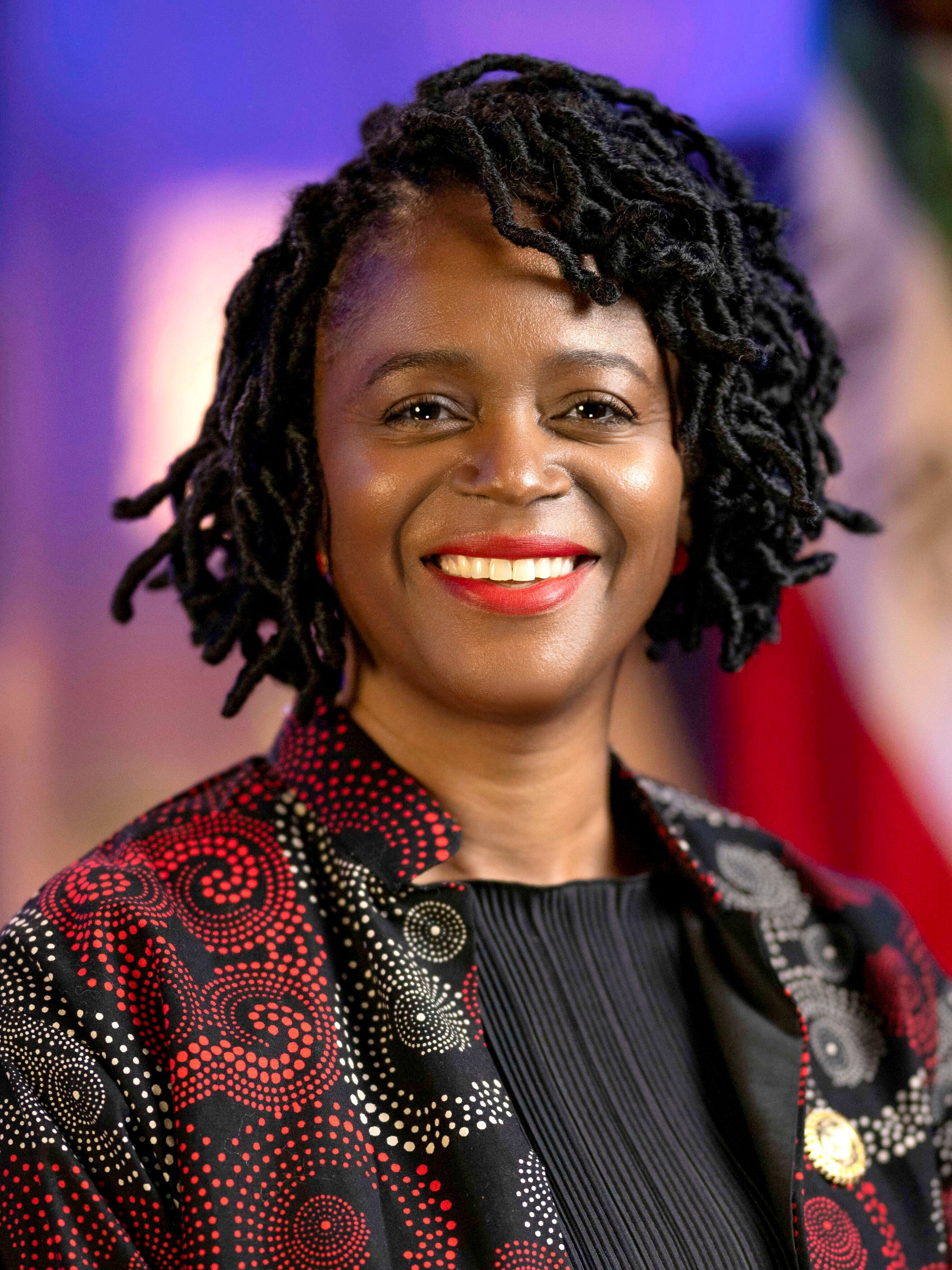
- Official portrait, 2024

Member of the California Senate from the 28th district
- Incumbent
- Assumed office December 5, 2022
- Preceded by: Sydney Kamlager-Dove

Personal details
- Party: Democratic
- Education: CSU East Bay
- Website: State Senate website Campaign website

Lola Smallwood-Cuevas is an American politician and a member of the California Senate. A Democrat, she has represented the 28th Senate District since 2022.

Smallwood-Cuevas succeeded the Senate seat vacated by Sydney Kamlager-Dove, who was elected to the California's 37th congressional district seat vacated by Karen Bass after she was sworn in as the Mayor of Los Angeles.

== Early life and career ==
Smallwood-Cuevas was raised by a single mother who worked as a registered nurse and homecare worker.

According to The Sacramento Observer, the newspaper which featured her in their fifth installment of their A Powerful Sisterhood series, "Smallwood-Cuevas spent more than two decades serving as a labor organizer, civil rights activist and community advocate". Prior to her election to California State Senate, Smallwood-Cuevas had worked for the UCLA Labor Center from 2004 to 2022, and she had served as its project director for 15 years.

While working for the UCLA Labor Center, Smallwood-Cuevas founded the Los Angeles Black Worker Center at the University of California, Los Angeles, with the mission of connecting working class black residents of Los Angeles to employment prospects and unionization resources. She had also founded the Center for the Advancement for Racial Equity at Work. By 2015, the LA Black Worker Center had become instrumental in providing training for black residents to enter the construction industry and advocating for governmental contractors to prioritize local hires, which culminated in black residents making up 20% of Metro Crenshaw K Line's project workforce. In October 2015, President of the United States Barack Obama recognized the organization's success.

In July 2020, Smallwood-Cuevas spoke out against Los Angeles Mayor Eric Garcetti's announcement of an expansion to policing in communities of color as well as the Los Angeles City Council's vote to resume cleaning encampments in special zones, calling it "regressive thinking that we need to move beyond" and " part of our failure that the Black community is just 7% of the population, but 40% of those who are on the street".

Her successful 2022 bid for California State Senate was endorsed by the Los Angeles Times.

== Electoral history ==
2022 California State Senate 28th district election
Primary election
Party	Candidate	Votes	%
Democratic	Lola Smallwood-Cuevas	63,211	44.8
Democratic	Cheryl C. Turner	42,728	30.3
Republican	Joe Lisuzzo	20,785	14.7
Democratic	Kamilah Victoria Moore	9,162	6.5
Democratic	Jamaal A. Gulledge	5,267	3.7
Total votes		141,153	100.0
General election
Democratic	Lola Smallwood-Cuevas	117,315	59.9
Democratic	Cheryl C. Turner	78,453	40.1
Total votes		195,768	100.0
Democratic gain from Republican			
