= 2018 Orange County Board of Supervisors election =

County election in California, U.S.

Orange County Board of Supervisors elections, 2018
- June 5 and November 6, 2018

3 of 5 seats to the Orange County Board of Supervisors
	Majority party	Minority party	Third party
Party	Republican	Democratic	Libertarian
Last election	5	0	0
Seats before	5	0	0
Seats won	2	1	0
Seats after	4	1	0
Seat change	▼1	▲1	Steady
Popular vote	270,980	108,246	15,281
Percentage	68.7%	27.4%	3.9%

Republican
60–70%
100%
Winners
Republican hold
Democratic gain
No election
Democratic
50–60%

The 2018 Orange County Board of Supervisors elections were held on June 5, 2018, and November 6, 2018. Three of the five seats of the Orange County, California Board of Supervisors were up for election.

County elections in California are officially nonpartisan. A two-round system was used for the election, starting with the first round in June, followed by a runoff in November between the top two candidates in each district. Runoffs are only held if no candidate receives a majority in each district.

== Results ==
- Note: All elections for the Orange County Board of Supervisors are officially nonpartisan. The parties below identify which party label each candidate would have run under if given the option. Candidates all appear on the ballot as nonpartisan.

=== Results by county supervisorial district ===
- For districts not displayed, there would be no election until 2020.

Board of Supervisors District	Incumbent	Party	Elected Supervisor	Party
2nd	Michelle Steel	Republican	Michelle Steel	Republican
4th	Shawn Nelson	Republican	Doug Chaffee	Democratic
5th	Lisa Bartlett	Republican	Lisa Bartlett	Republican

=== Close races ===
Seats where the margin of victory was under 5%:

1. County Supervisorial district 4, 0.8%

== District 2 ==
2018 Orange County Board of Supervisors District 2 election
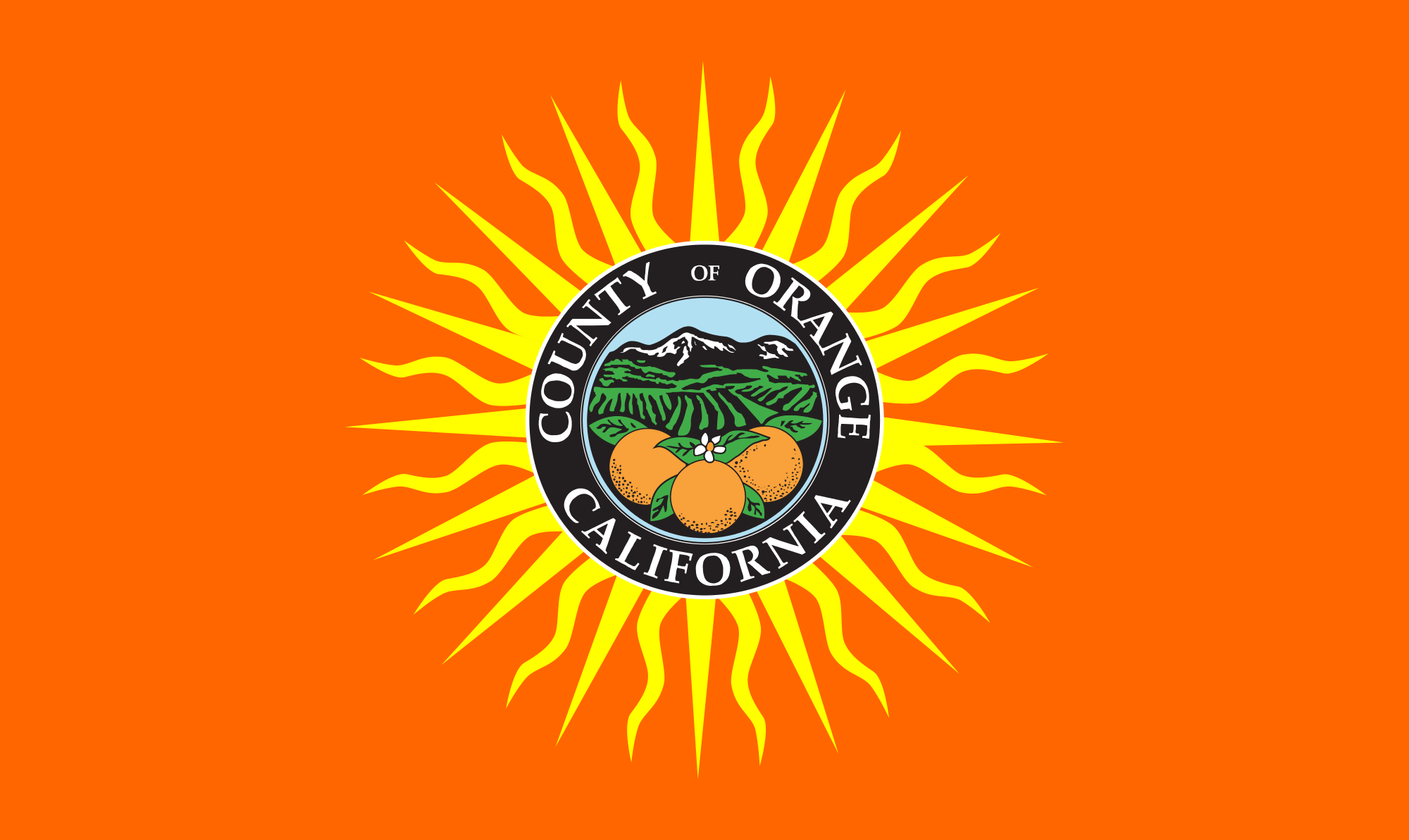
- June 5, 2018
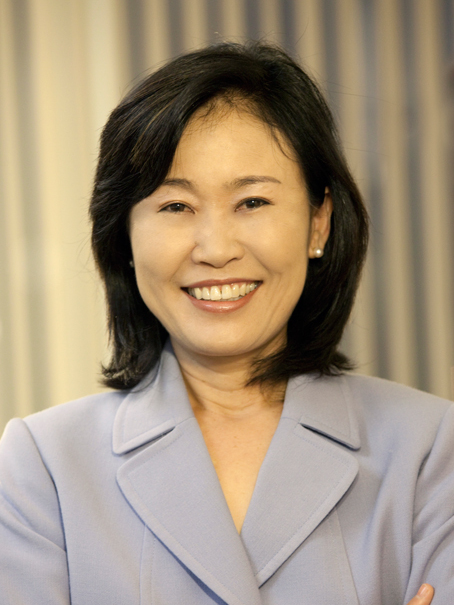

Candidate	Michelle Steel	Brendon Perkins	Michael Mahony
First round	80,854; 63.4%	31,387; 24.6%	15,281; 12.0%
Supervisor before election
Michelle Steel
Elected Supervisor
Michelle Steel

District 2 consists of coastal Orange County, including Huntington Beach, Costa Mesa, Cypress, La Palma, Los Alamitos, Newport Beach, Seal Beach, most of Fountain Valley, and neighborhoods in southern Buena Park.

=== General election ===
==== Candidates ====
- Michael Mahony (Libertarian)
- Brendon Perkins (Democratic)
- Michelle Steel (Republican)

==== Endorsements ====
Michelle Steel

U.S. representatives

- Ken Calvert, U.S. representative from California (R-CA-42)
- Paul Cook U.S. representative (R-CA-8)
- Darrell Issa, U.S. representative from California (R-CA-49)
- Dana Rohrabacher, U.S. representative from California (R-CA-48)
- Ed Royce, U.S. representative from California (R-CA-39)
Brendon Perkins

Organizations

- Community Action fund of Planned Parenthood
- Democratic Party of Orange County
- Orange County Labor Federation

==== Results ====
2018 Orange County's 2nd supervisorial district general election results by congressional district Map legend: Steel—60–70%

Orange County Board of Supervisors 2nd district, 2018
Candidate	Votes	%
Michelle Steel (incumbent)	80,854	63.4
Brendon Perkins	31,387	24.6
Michael Mahony	15,281	12.0
Total votes	127,522	100.0

== District 4 ==
2018 Orange County Board of Supervisors District 4 election
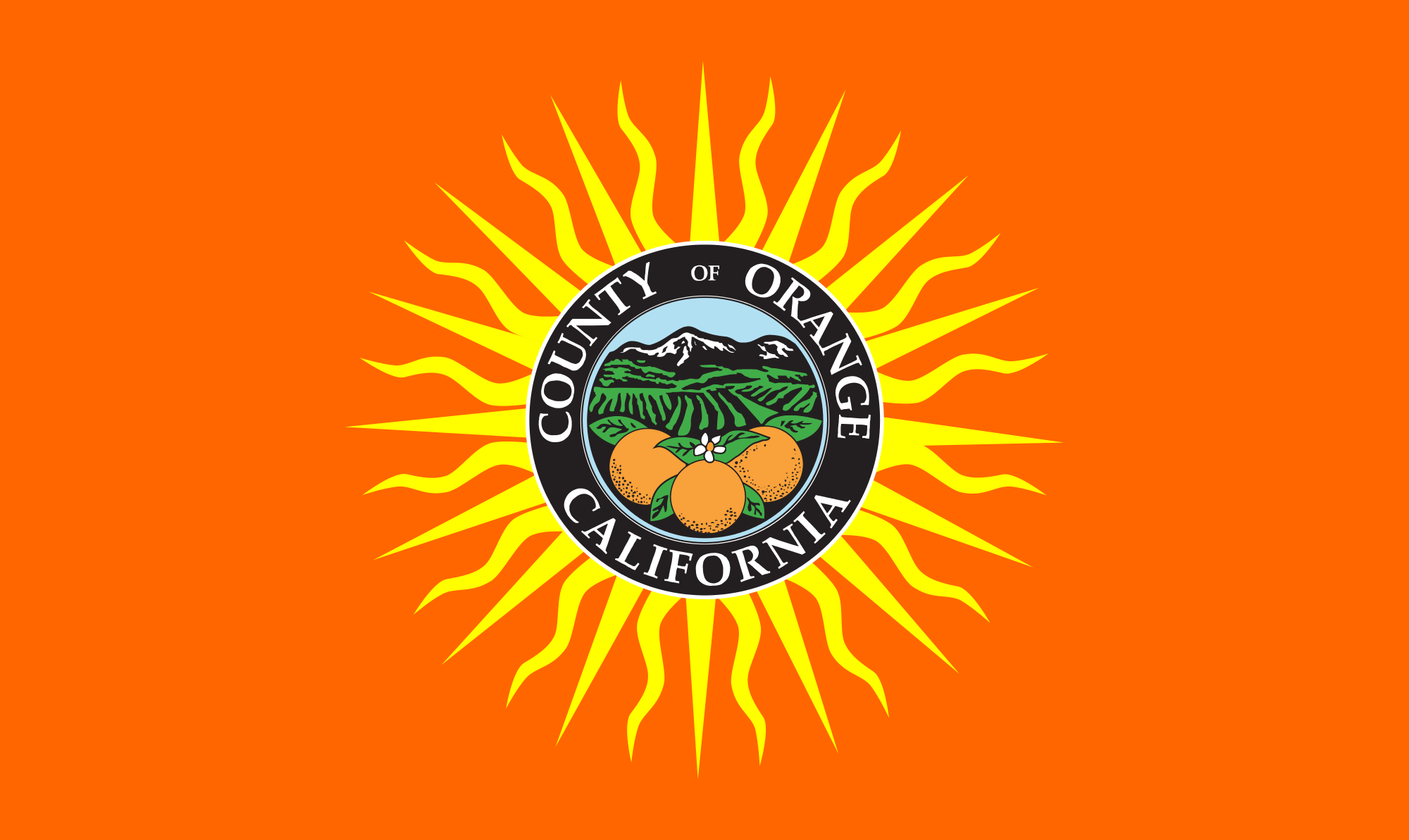
- June 5 and November 6, 2018
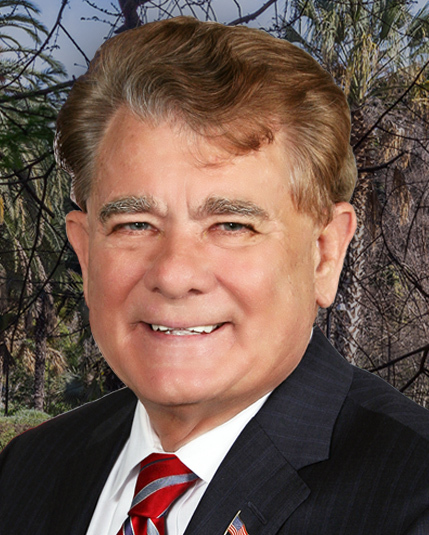

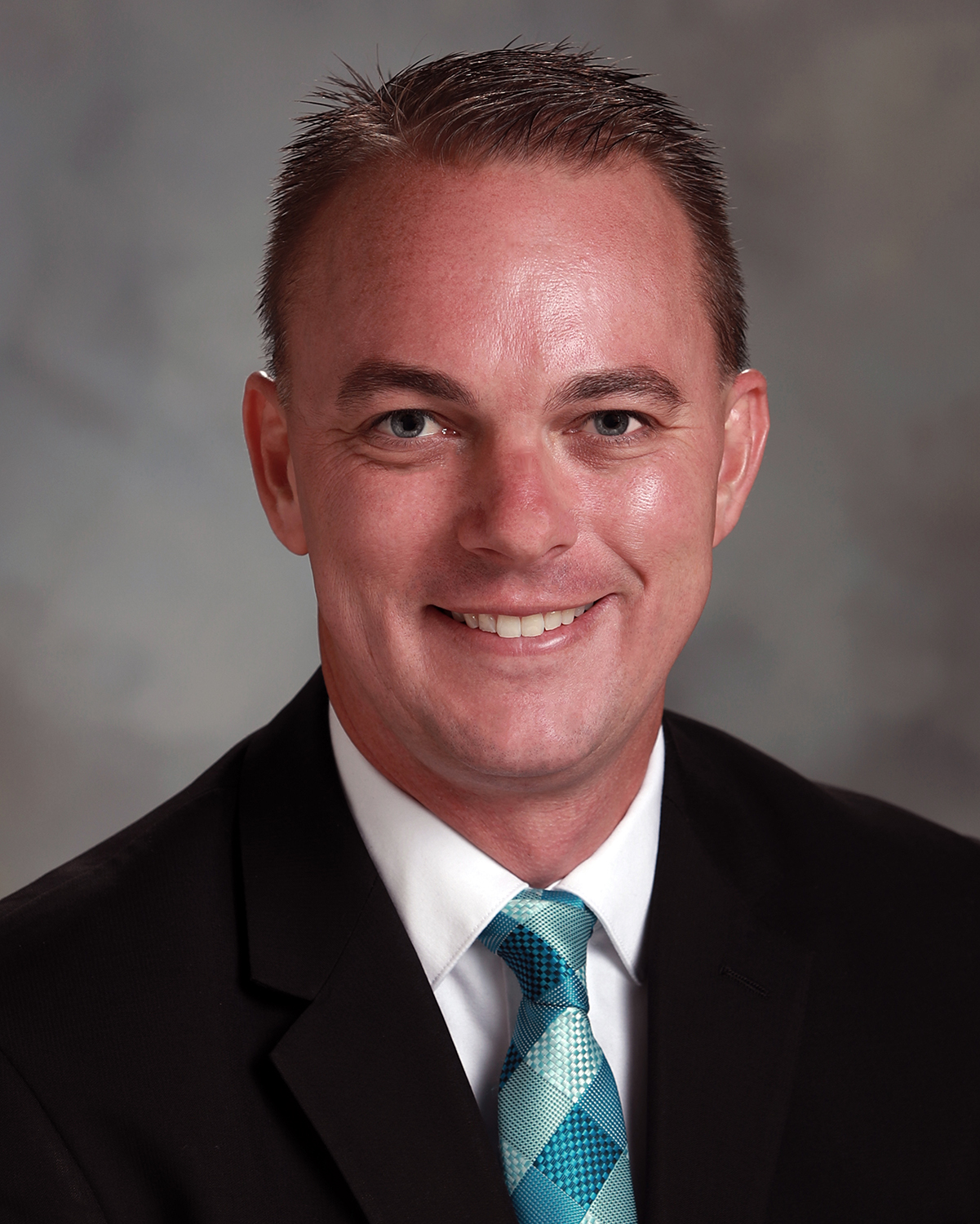

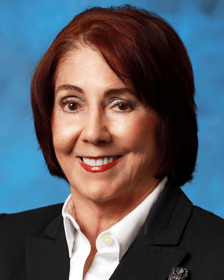

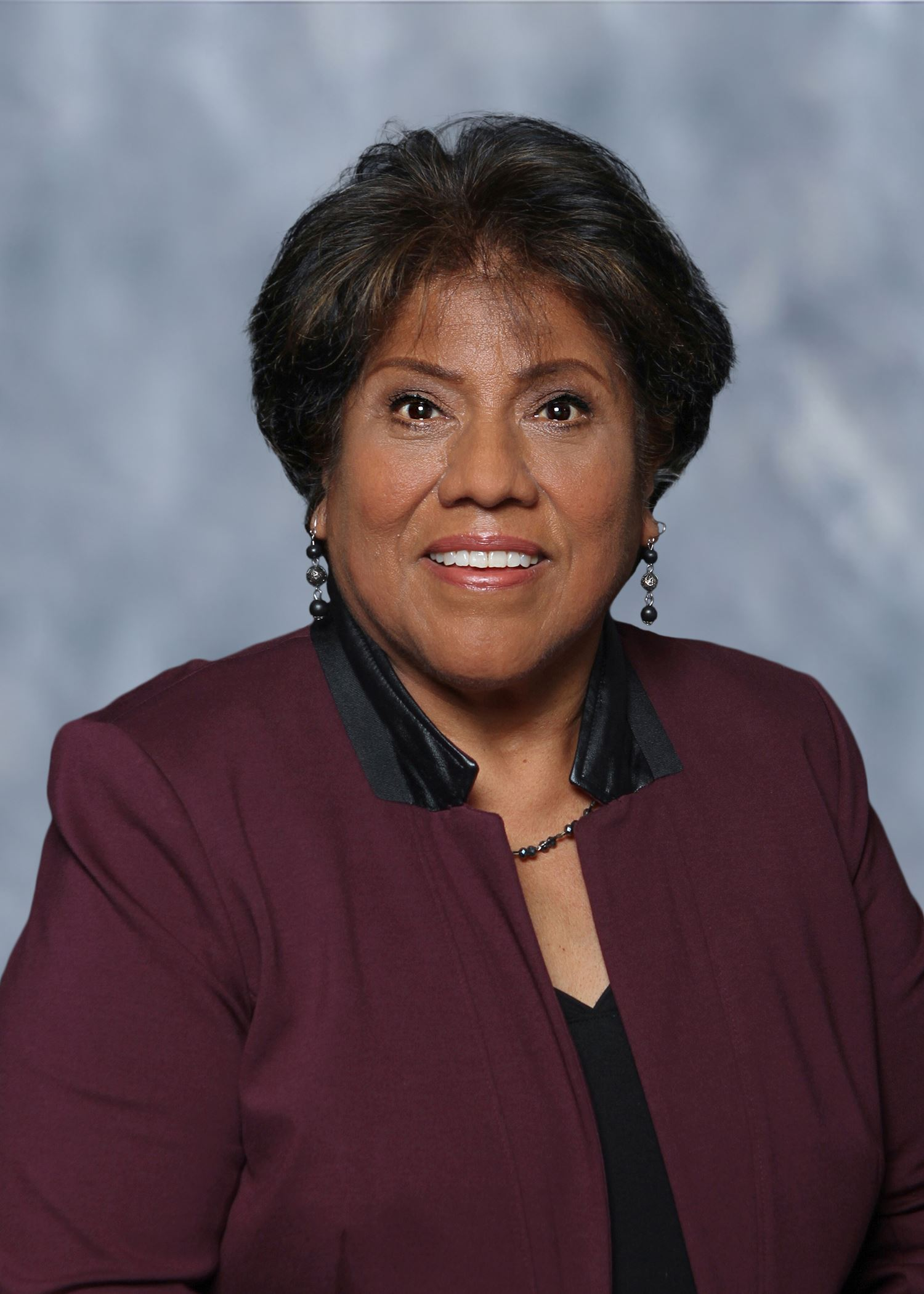

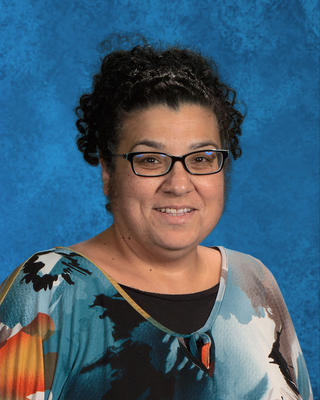
Candidate	Doug Chaffee	Tim Shaw	Joe Kerr
First round	18,093; 20.5	31,387; 24.6%	17,717; 20.1%
Runoff	76,859; 50.4	75,537; 49.6	Eliminated
Candidate	Lucille Kring	Rose Espinoza	Cynthia Aguirre
First round	15,347; 17.4%	10,397; 11.8%	8,419; 9.6%
Runoff	Eliminated	Eliminated	Eliminated
Supervisor before election
Shawn Nelson
Elected Supervisor
Doug Chaffee

District 4 consists of inland northwestern Orange County, taking in Fullerton, La Habra, Placentia, Brea, western Anaheim, and most of Buena Park. Incumbent Shawn Nelson retired to run for California's 39th congressional district.

=== General election ===
==== Candidates ====
- Cynthia Aguirre (Democratic)
- Doug Chaffee (Democratic)
- Rose Espinoza (Democratic)
- Joe Kerr (Democratic)
- Lucille Kring (Republican)
- Tim Shaw (Republican)

==== Endorsements ====
Tim Shaw

U.S. representatives

- Ed Royce, U.S. representative from California (R-CA-39)

==== Results ====
2018 Orange County's 4th supervisorial district general election initial round results by congressional district Map legend: Shaw—50–60%; Chaffee—<30%; Kring—<30%

Orange County Board of Supervisors 4th district, 2018
Candidate	Votes	%
Tim Shaw	18,171	20.6
Doug Chaffee	18,093	20.5
Joe Kerr	17,717	20.1
Lucille Kring	15,347	17.4
Rose Espinoza	10,397	11.8
Cynthia Aguirre	8,419	9.6
Total votes	88,141	100.0

=== Runoff ===
==== Results ====
2018 Orange County's 4th supervisorial district general election runoff results by congressional district Map legend: Chaffee—60–70%; Chaffee—50–60%; Shaw—50–60%

Orange County Board of Supervisors 4th district runoff, 2018
Candidate	Votes	%
Doug Chaffee	76,859	50.4
Tim Shaw	75,537	49.6
Total votes	152,396	100.0

== District 5 ==
2018 Orange County Board of Supervisors District 5 election
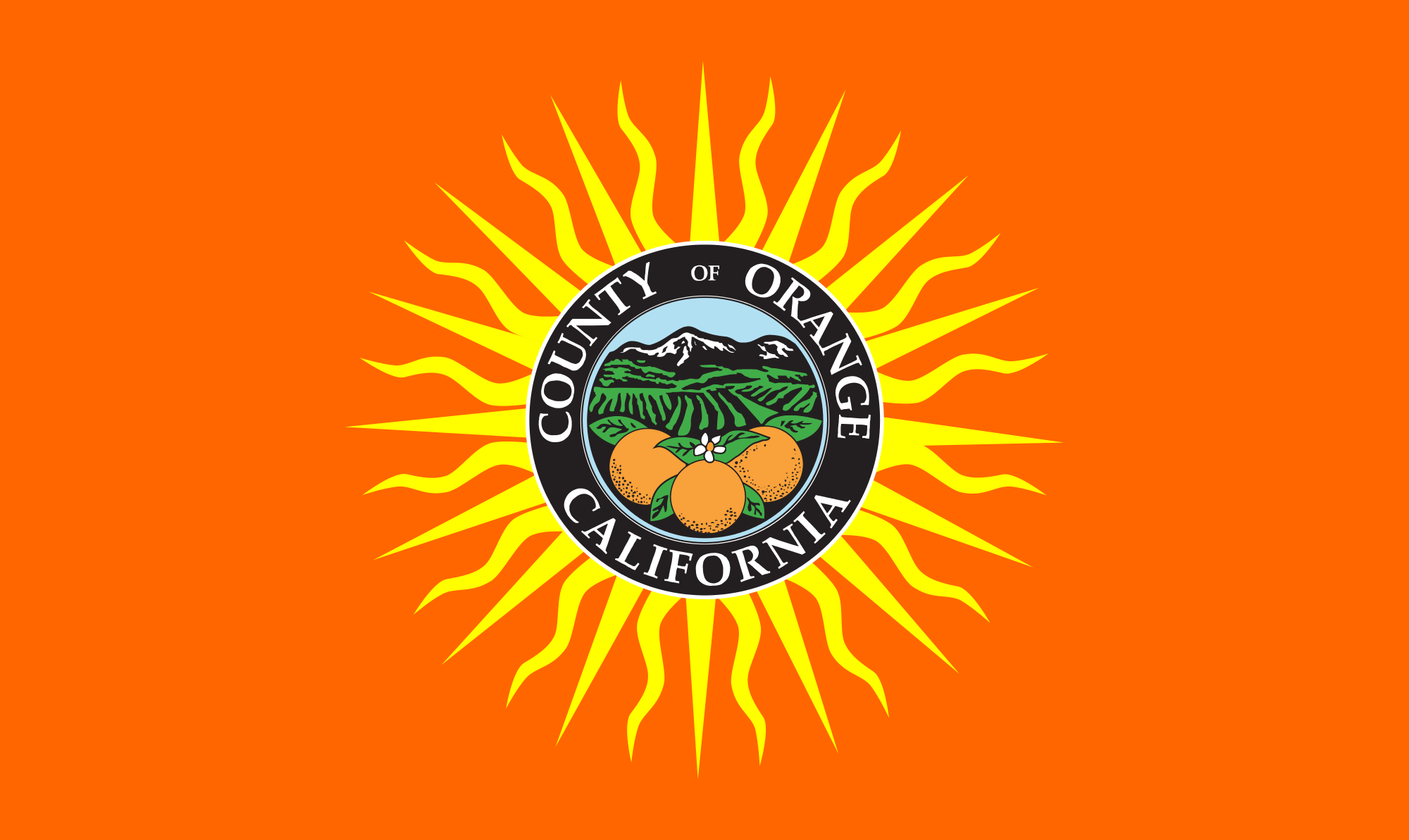
- June 5, 2018
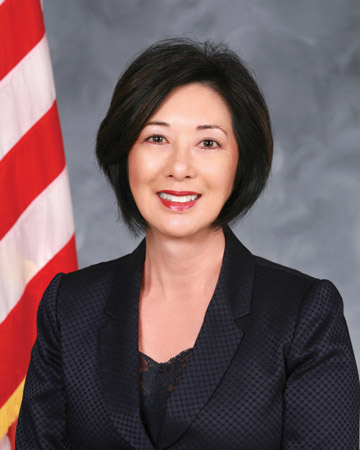
Candidate	Lisa Bartlett
First round	113,567; 100.00%
Supervisor before election
Lisa Bartlett
Elected Supervisor
Lisa Bartlett

District 5 encompasses southern Orange County, including Aliso Viejo, Laguna Hills, Laguna Niguel, Laguna Woods, Lake Forest, Mission Viejo, Rancho Santa Margarita, San Juan Capistrano, Laguna Beach, San Clemente, and Dana Point.

=== General election ===
==== Results ====
2018 Orange County's 5th supervisorial district general election results by congressional district Map legend: Bartlett—100%

Orange County Board of Supervisors 5th district, 2018
Candidate	Votes	%
Lisa Bartlett (incumbent)	113,567	100.0
Total votes	113,567	100.0
