= 2022 Orange County Board of Supervisors election =

Orange County Board of Supervisors elections, 2022
- June 7, 2022 (first round); November 8, 2022 (runoff)

3 of 5 seats to the Orange County Board of Supervisors
- Registered: 1,817,149
	Majority party	Minority party
Party	Democratic	Republican
Last election	2	3
Seats before	2	3
Seats won	3	0
Seats after	3	2
Seat change	▲1	▼1
Popular vote	340,077	109,336
Percentage	75.67%	24.33%
- Winners: Democratic gain Democratic hold No election

The 2022 Orange County Board of Supervisors elections were held on June 7 and November 8, 2022. Three of the five seats of the Orange County, California Board of Supervisors were up for election. This was the first set of elections held after the 2020 redistricting cycle. County elections in California are officially nonpartisan. A two-round system was used for the election, starting with the first round in June. Runoffs were held in all three districts, as no candidate managed to reach the 50% + 1 threshold.

Preceding the election, the Republican Party held three seats on the board, while the Democratic Party held two. One Republican-held district, the 5th, and two Democratic-held districts, the 2nd and 4th, were up for election in 2022. In the 2nd and 4th districts, both candidates who advanced from the jungle primary were Democrats, guaranteeing that the Democratic Party will hold those seats. In the 5th district, one Republican and one Democrat advanced, meaning that control of the entire board rested on the outcome of the general election in that district. After the election Democrats flipped the 5th district, taking control of the board for the first time in over 40 years.

Key issues in the 2022 election included the COVID-19 pandemic, especially the board's role in enforcing mask and vaccine mandates, and how to prioritize spending between law enforcement and other public services.

== District 2 ==
2022 Orange County Board of Supervisors District 2 election
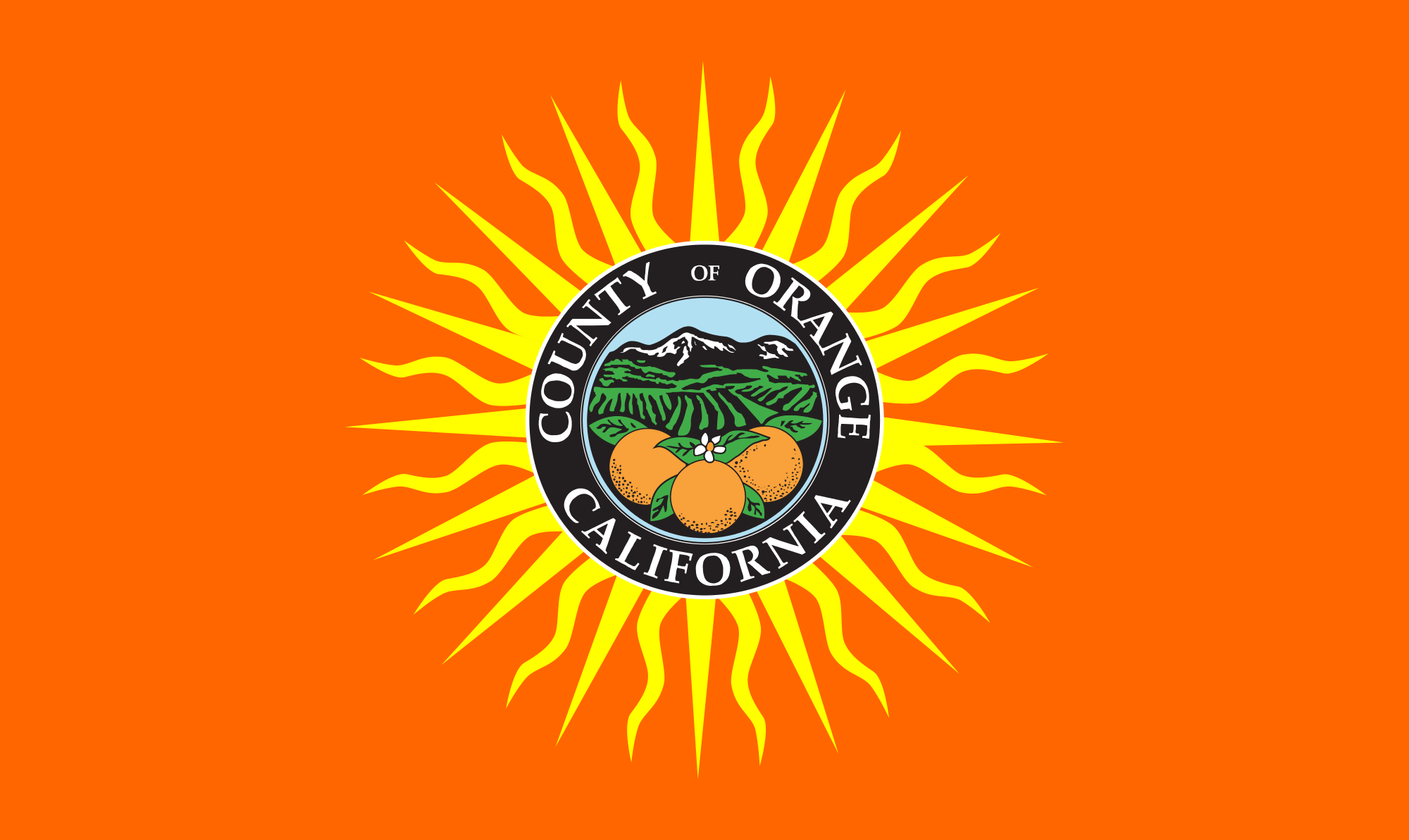
- June 7, 2022 (first round); November 8, 2022 (runoff)
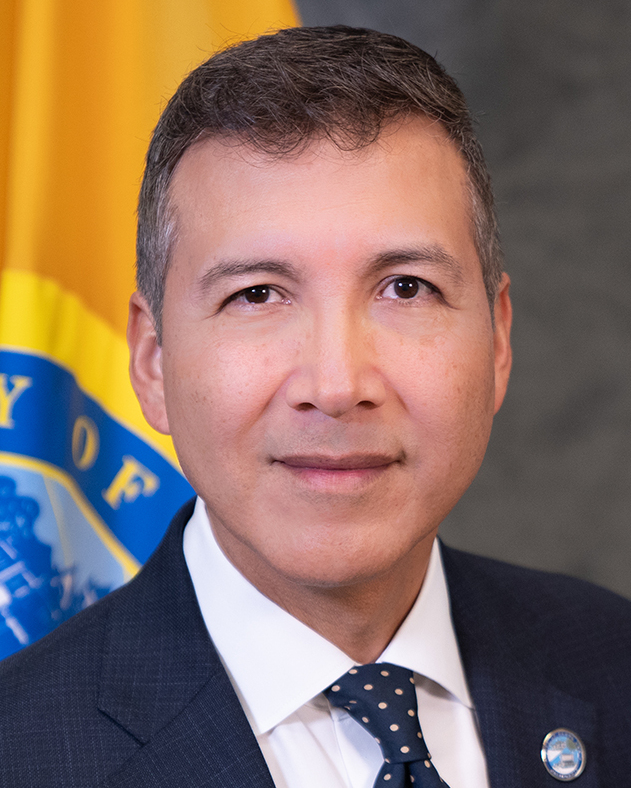

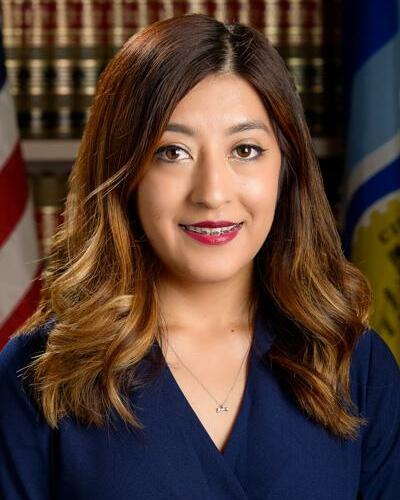

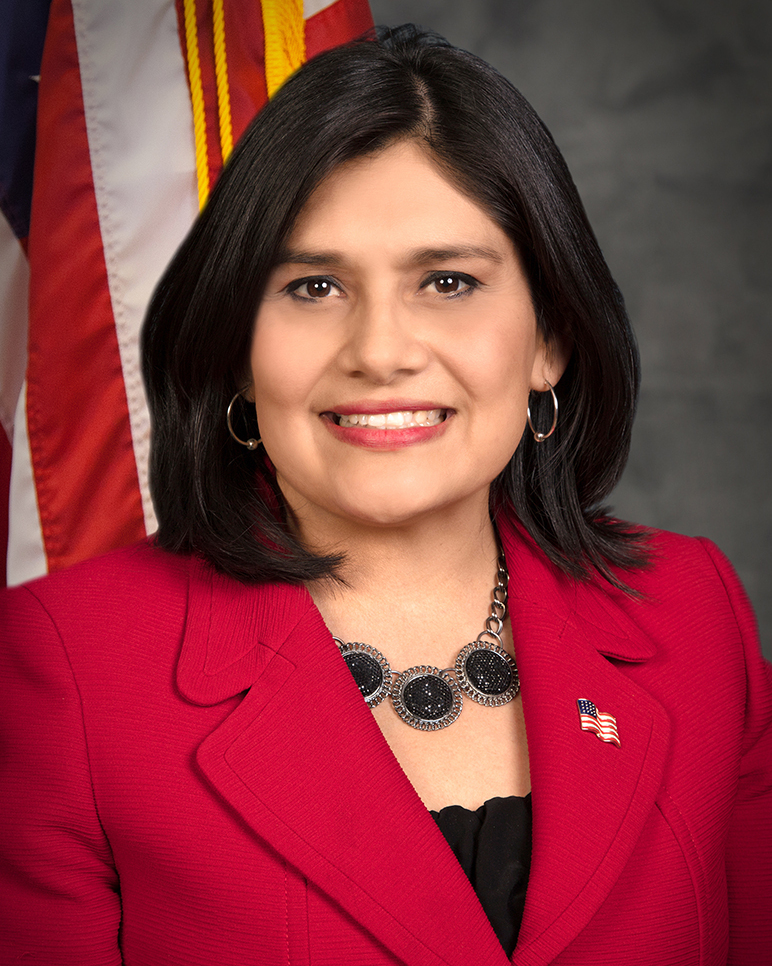

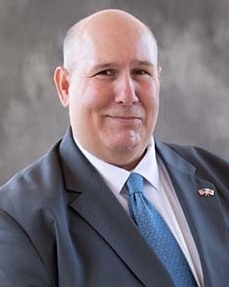

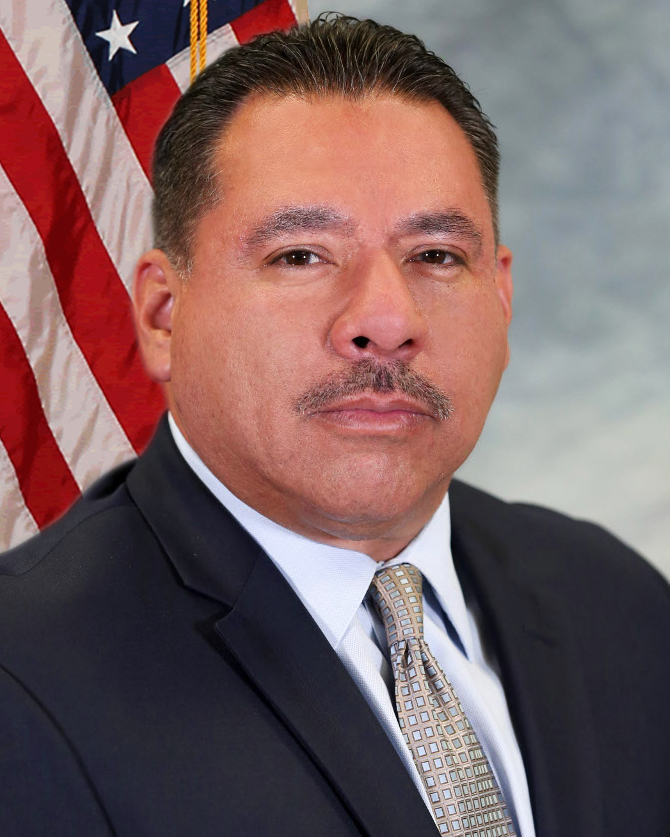
Candidate	Vicente Sarmiento	Kim Bernice Nguyen	Cecilia Iglesias
First round	21,789; 35.05%	21,721; 22.27%	10,580; 17.01%
Runoff	48,923; 51.62%	45,854; 48.38%	Eliminated
Candidate	Jon Dumitru	Juan Villegas
First round	10,281; 16.44%	5,699; 9.17%
Runoff	Eliminated	Eliminated
Supervisor before election
Katrina Foley
Elected Supervisor
Vicente Sarmiento

The 2nd district includes Santa Ana as well as parts of Anaheim, Garden Grove, Orange, and Tustin. Due to changes in redistricting, this is the county's first ever majority-Latino district. Incumbent supervisor Katrina Foley chose to seek re-election in the 5th district, making this an open seat.

=== Candidates ===
Note: County elections in California are officially nonpartisan. The parties below identify which party label each candidate would have run under if given the option.

- Jon Dumitru (Republican), Orange city councilor
- Cecilia Iglesias (Republican), former Santa Ana city councilor
- Kim Bernice Nguyen (Democratic), Garden Grove city councilor
- Vicente Sarmiento (Democratic), mayor of Santa Ana
- Juan Villegas (Independent), former Santa Ana city councilor

=== General election ===
2022 Orange County Board of Supervisors 2nd district election
Candidate	Votes	%
Vicente Sarmiento	21,916	35.05
Kim Bernice Nguyen	13,923	22.27
Cecilia Iglesias	10,635	17.01
Jon Dumitru	10,321	16.44
Juan Villegas	5,733	9.17
Total votes	62,528	100.00

=== Runoff ===
2022 Orange County Board of Supervisors 2nd district runoff election
Candidate	Votes	%
Vicente Sarmiento	48,923	51.62
Kim Bernice Nguyen	45,854	48.38
Total votes	94,777	100.00

== District 4 ==
2022 Orange County Board of Supervisors District 4 election
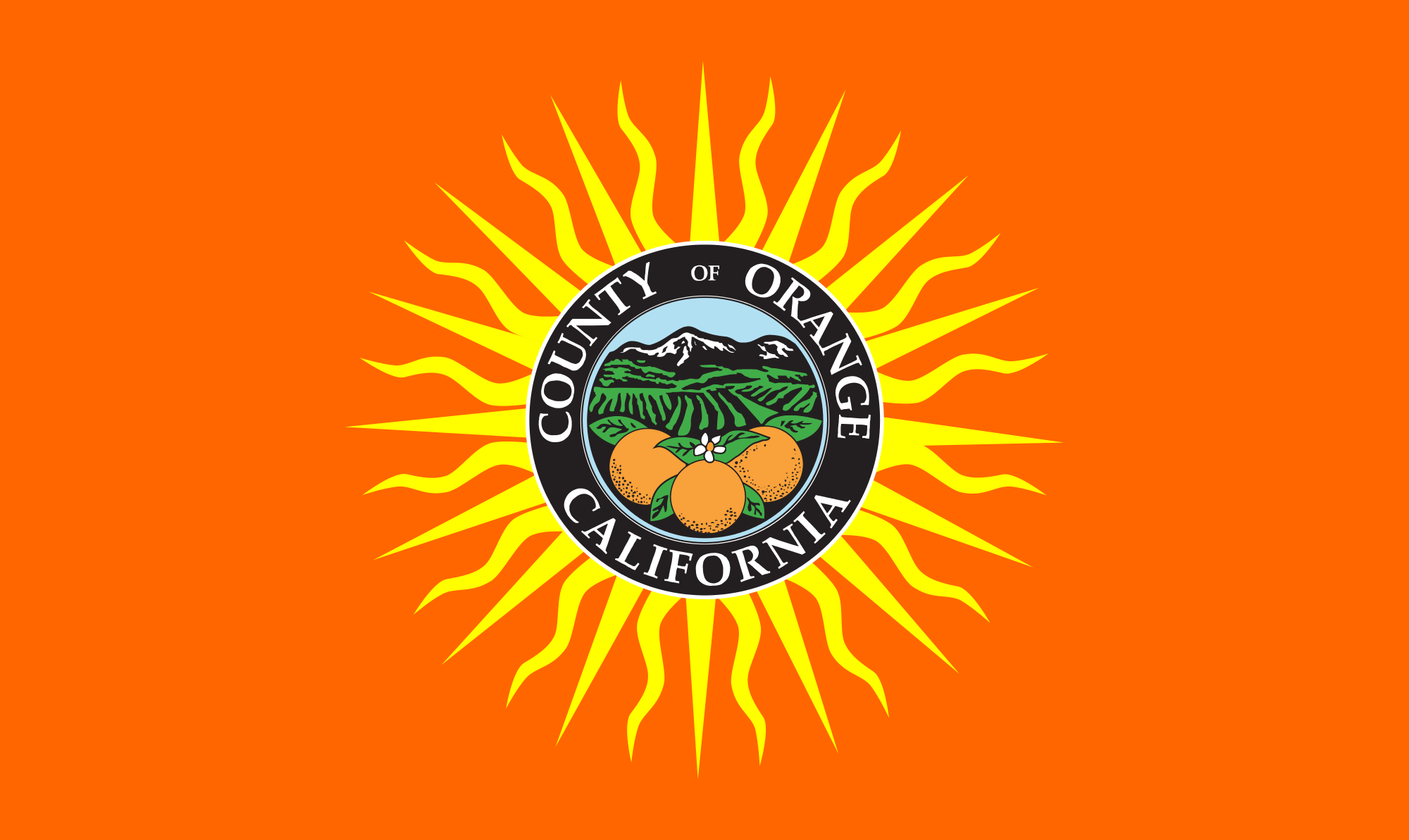
- June 7, 2022 (first round); November 8, 2022 (runoff)
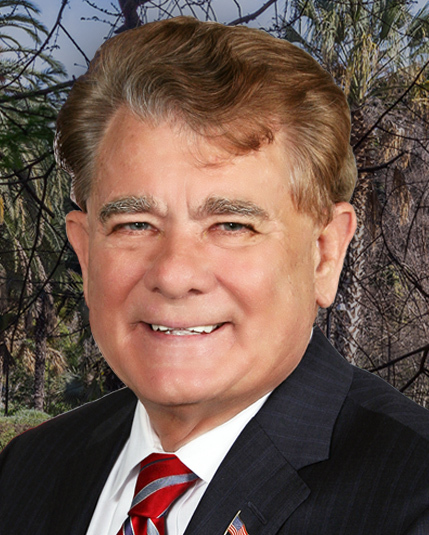

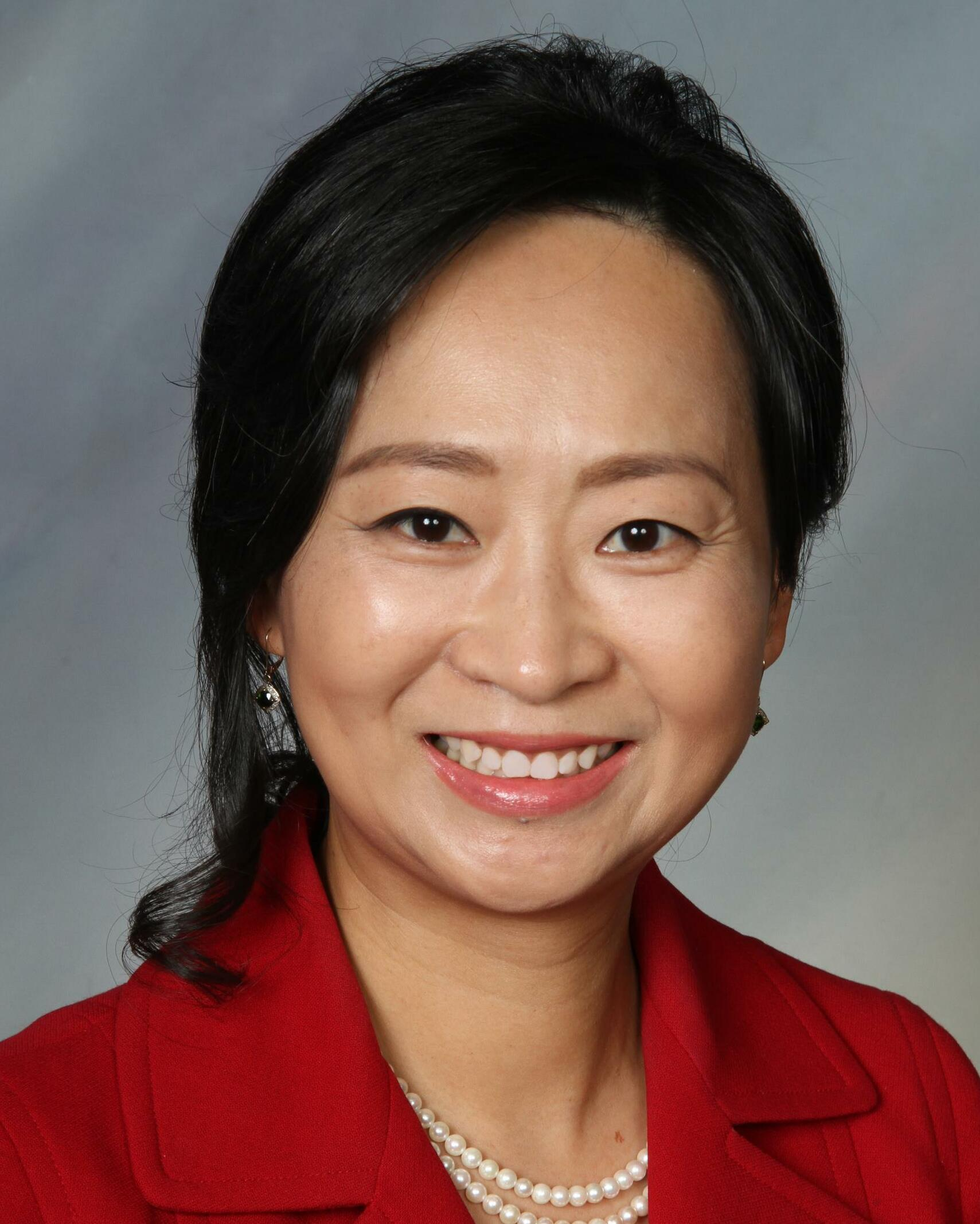

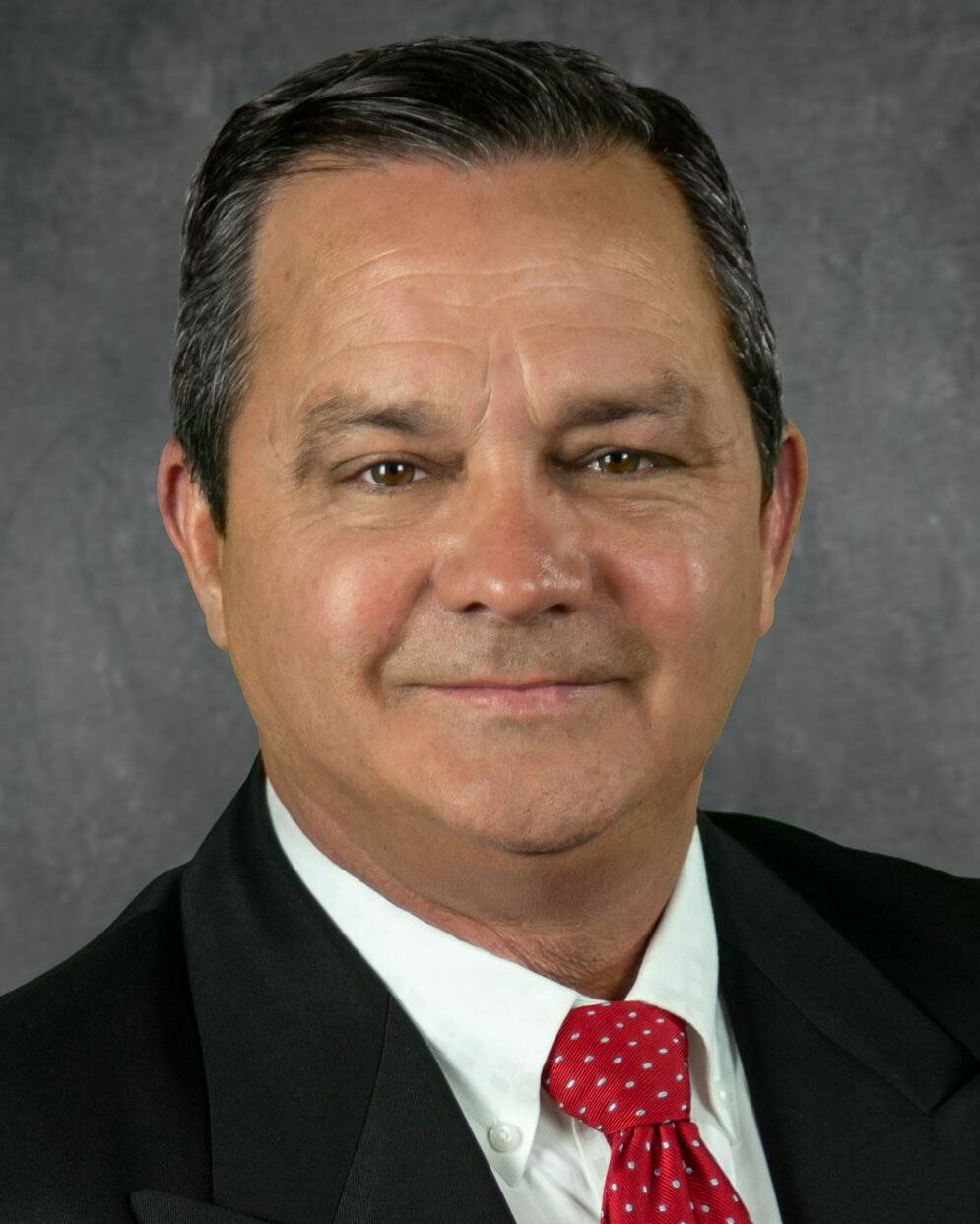
Candidate	Doug Chaffee	Sunny Park	Steve Vargas
First round	27,901; 32.42%	30,795; 35.80%	27,323; 31.78%
Runoff	72,272; 55.40%	58,181; 44.60%	Eliminated
Supervisor before election
Doug Chaffee
Supervisor after election
Doug Chaffee

The 4th district includes Brea, Buena Park, Fullerton, La Habra, Placentia, Stanton, and parts of Anaheim. The incumbent was Democrat Doug Chaffee, who was elected with 50.4% of the vote in 2018. Chaffee faced criticism within his own party for some of his votes and actions in office, and the Orange County Democratic Party endorsed his challenger Sunny Park.

=== Candidates ===
Note: County elections in California are officially nonpartisan. The parties below identify which party label each candidate would have run under if given the option.

- Doug Chaffee (Democratic), incumbent supervisor
- Sunny Park (Democratic), mayor of Buena Park
- Steve Vargas (Republican), Brea city councilor

=== General election ===
2022 Orange County Board of Supervisors 4th district election
Candidate	Votes	%
Sunny Park	30,904	35.80
Doug Chaffee (incumbent)	27,990	32.42
Steve Vargas	27,436	31.78
Total votes	86,330	100.00

=== Runoff ===
2022 Orange County Board of Supervisors 4th district runoff election
Candidate	Votes	%
Doug Chaffee (incumbent)	72,272	55.40
Sunny Park	58,181	44.60
Total votes	130,453	100.00

== District 5 ==
2022 Orange County Board of Supervisors District 5 election
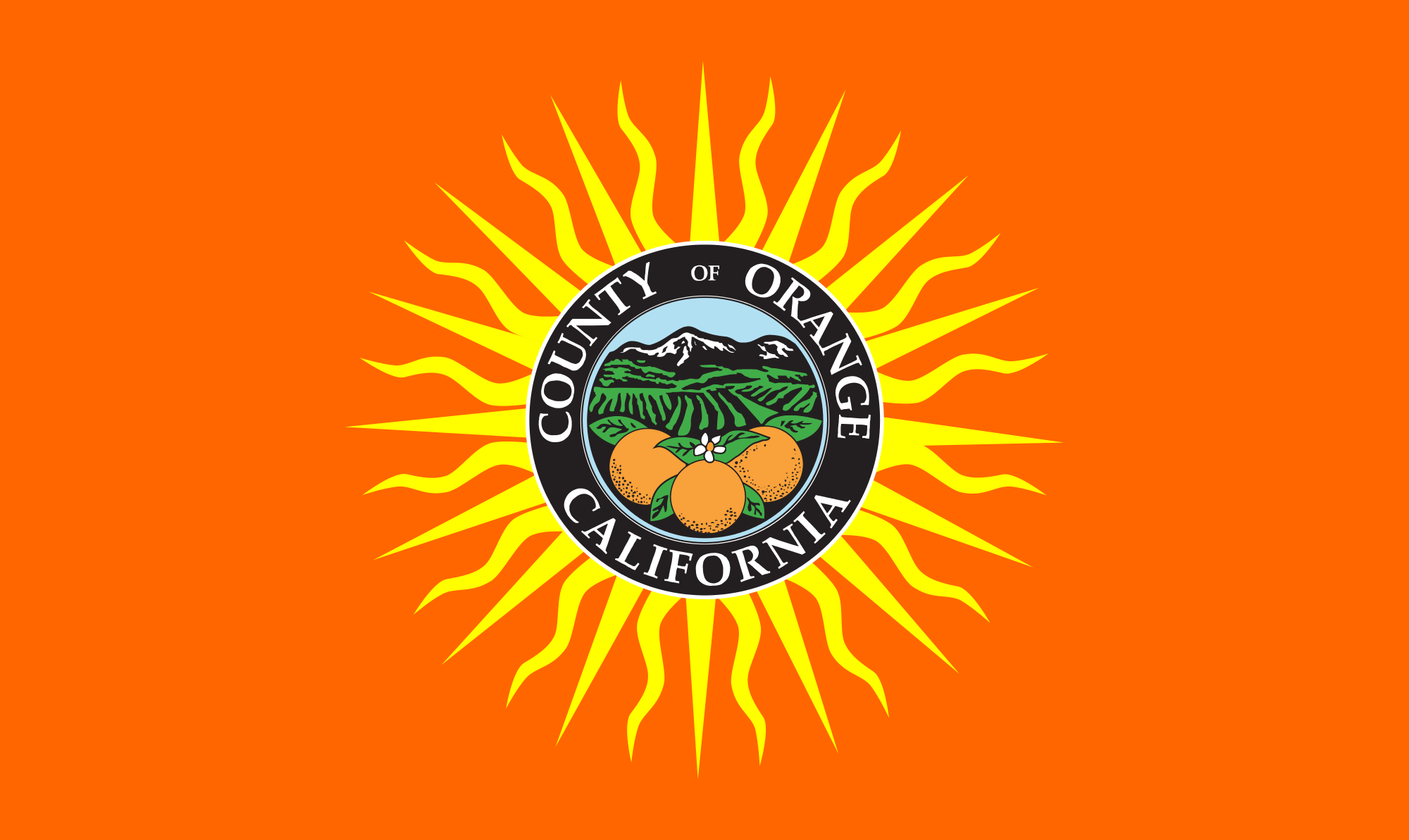
- June 7, 2022 (first round); November 8, 2022 (runoff)
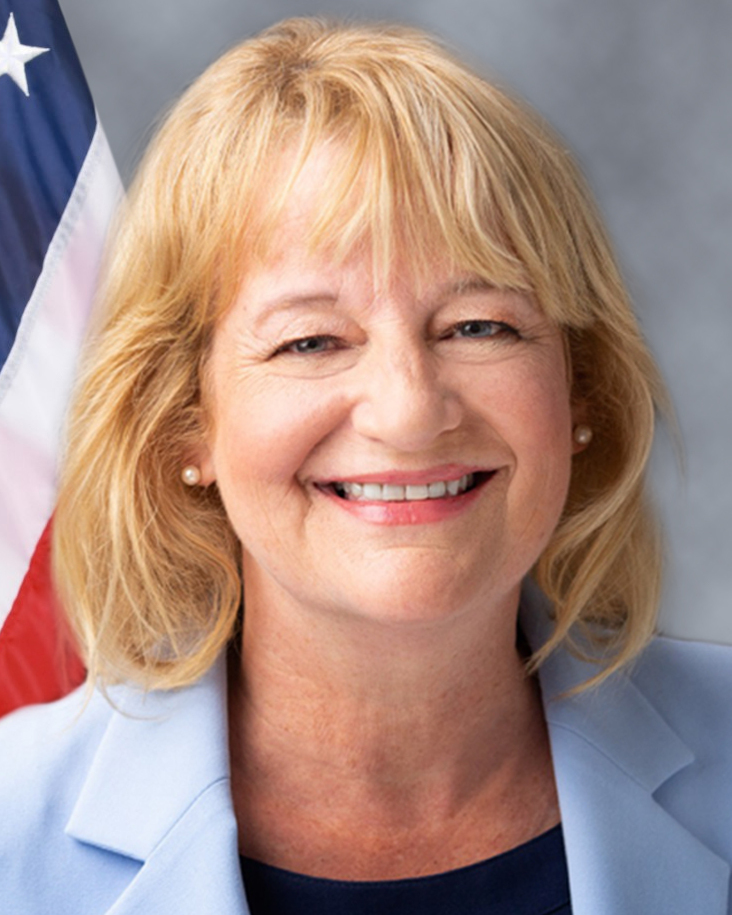

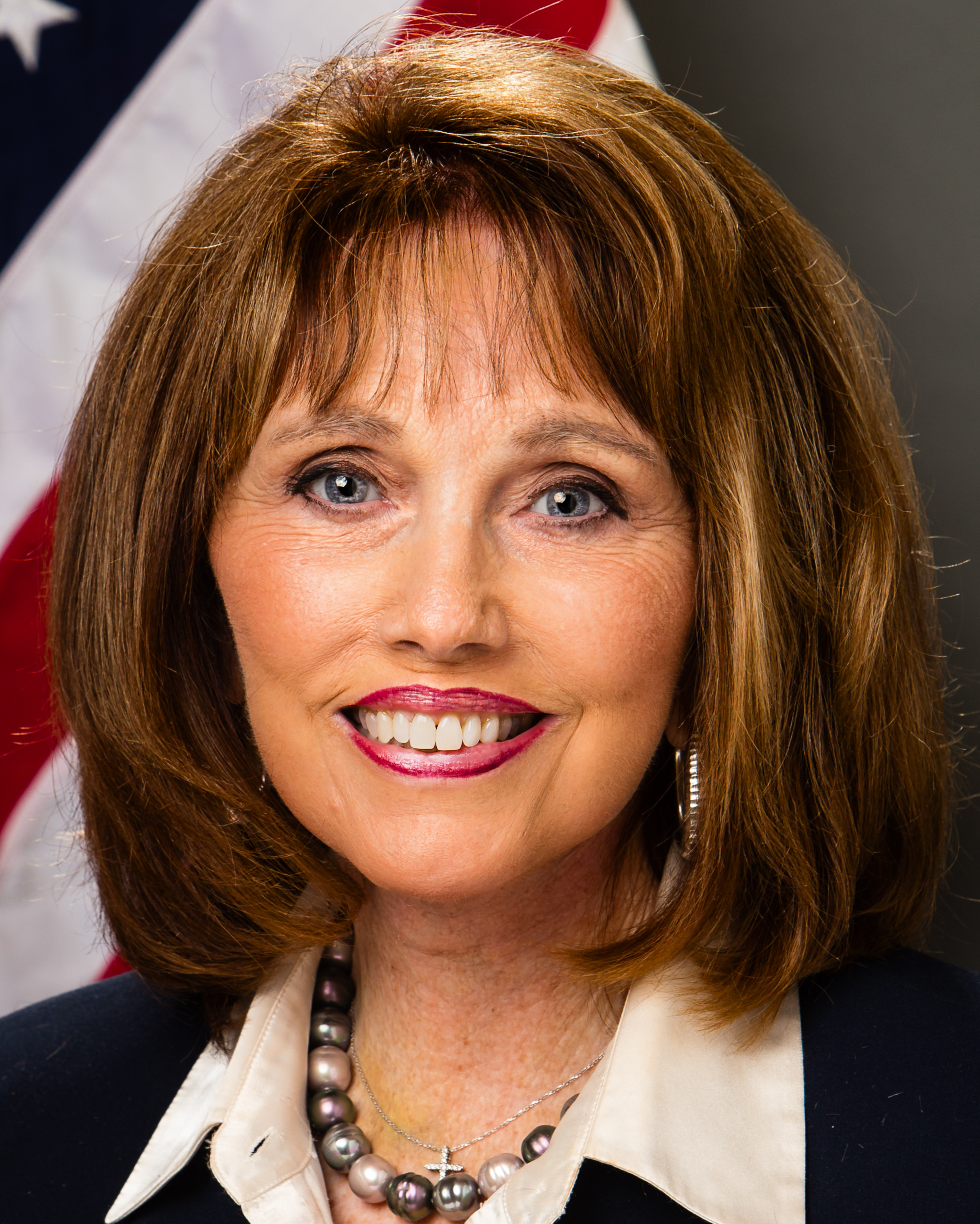

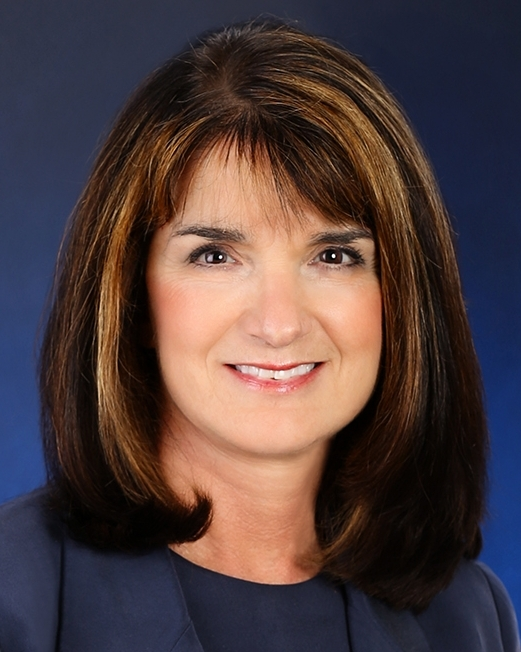

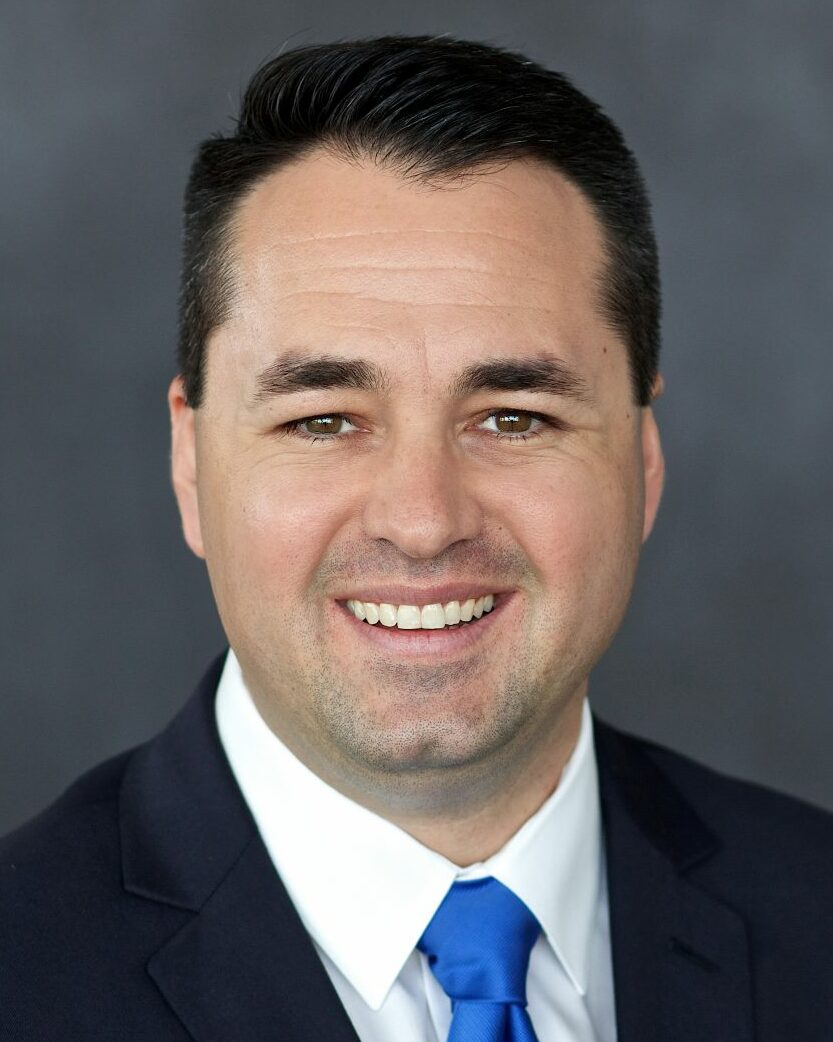
Candidate	Katrina Foley	Patricia Bates
First round	64,888; 41.76%	34,467; 22.18%
Runoff	114,105; 51.30%	110,238; 48.70%
Candidate	Diane Harkey	Kevin Muldoon
First round	28,809; 18.54%	27,229; 17.52%
Runoff	Eliminated	Eliminated
Supervisor before election
Lisa Bartlett
Supervisor after election
Katrina Foley

The 5th district is largely coastal and includes Aliso Viejo, Costa Mesa, Dana Point, Laguna Beach, Laguna Hills, Laguna Niguel, Laguna Woods, Newport Beach, San Clemente, San Juan Capistrano, several unincorporated communities, and the southern portion of Irvine. The incumbent was Republican Lisa Bartlett, who was term-limited and could not seek re-election, and instead ran for U.S. House. Democratic 2nd district incumbent Katrina Foley switched to run in this district. Foley was elected with 43.4% of the vote in a 2021 special election.

=== Candidates ===
Note: County elections in California are officially nonpartisan. The parties below identify which party label each candidate would have run under if given the option.

- Patricia Bates (Republican), state senator, former minority leader of the California Senate, and former Orange County supervisor
- Katrina Foley (Democratic), incumbent 2nd district supervisor
- Diane Harkey (Republican), former member of the California State Board of Equalization and runner-up for California's 49th congressional district in 2018
- Kevin Muldoon (Republican), mayor of Newport Beach

=== Endorsements ===
Patricia Bates

Newspapers

- The Orange County Register
Katrina Foley

Local politicians

- 3 members of the Huntington Beach city council and former mayor Jill Hardy
- All 5 members of the Laguna Beach city council

Organizations

- Laguna Beach Democratic Party
- Orange County Democratic Party

=== General election ===
2022 Orange County Board of Supervisors 5th district election
Candidate	Votes	%
Katrina Foley (incumbent)	64,888	41.76
Patricia Bates	34,467	22.18
Diane Harkey	28,809	18.54
Kevin Muldoon	27,229	17.52
Total votes	155,393	100.00

=== Runoff ===
2022 Orange County Board Of Supervisors 5th district runoff election
Candidate	Votes	%
Katrina Foley (incumbent)	116,105	51.3
Patricia Bates	110,238	48.7
Total votes	226,343	100.00
