= Doug Chaffee =

Doug Chaffee may refer to:

- Douglas Chaffee, American artist
- Doug Chaffee (politician), American politician
