= Jim Silva =

American politician

Member of the California State Assembly from the 67th district
- In office December 4, 2006 – November 30, 2012
- Preceded by: Tom Harman
- Succeeded by: Melissa Melendez (redistricted)

Chair of the Orange County Board of Supervisors
- In office January 8, 1998 – January 5, 1999
- Preceded by: William G. Steiner
- Succeeded by: Charles V. Smith

Vice Chair of the Orange County Board of Supervisors
- In office January 6, 1997 – January 8, 1998
- Preceded by: William G. Steiner
- Succeeded by: Thomas W. Wilson
- In office January 4, 2000 – January 9, 2001
- Preceded by: Thomas W. Wilson
- Succeeded by: Thomas W. Wilson
- In office January 6, 2003 – January 4, 2005
- Preceded by: Thomas W. Wilson
- Succeeded by: Thomas W. Wilson

Member of the Orange County Board of Supervisors from the 2nd District
- In office January 3, 1995 – December 4, 2006
- Preceded by: Harriett Wieder
- Succeeded by: John Moorlach

Personal details
- Born: James Wayne Silva; January 15, 1944 (age 82) Fullerton, California
- Party: Republican
- Spouse: Connie Silva
- Children: Chad, Donna
- Education: San Jose State University (B.A.); Chapman University (M.A.)
- Occupation: Teacher/Real Estate Broker
- Website: http://www.assembly.ca.gov/silva

James Wayne "Jim" Silva (born January 15, 1944) is a Republican United States politician who served in the California State Assembly.

A native of Orange County, Silva earned his Bachelor of Arts in Business from San Jose State University and a master's degree from Chapman University. He was an economics teacher in the Garden Grove Unified School District from 1966 until 1994, when he was elected to the Orange County Board of Supervisors. Silva holds a real estate broker's license.

Silva served on the Huntington Beach City Council from 1988 until 1994, when he was elected to the Board of Supervisors. Silva was Mayor of Huntington Beach. Silva served three terms as a member of the Orange County Board of Supervisors, representing the second district from 1995 to 2006, when he was elected to the State Assembly. Silva is a former member of the Orange County Transportation Authority, Orange County Sanitation District, South Coast Air Quality Management District, and LAFCO.

Silva and his wife, Connie, married in 1970. Their son Chad, born 1976, and their daughter, Donna, born 1978, are both officers in the United States Air Force.

California Assembly
Preceded by Tom Harman	67th District; 2nd District; 2006–2010	Succeeded by Melissa Melendez
Political offices
Preceded by William G. Steiner	Orange County Chair; 1998–1999	Succeeded by Charles V. Smith
Preceded by William G. Steiner	Orange County Vice Chair; 1997–1998; 2000-2001; 2003-2005	Succeeded by Thomas W. Wilson
Preceded by Thomas W. Wilson	Orange County Vice Chair; 1997–1998; 2000-2001; 2003-2005	Succeeded by Thomas W. Wilson
Preceded by William G. Steiner	Orange County Supervisor; 2nd District; 1995–2006	Succeeded by Thomas W. Wilson
