= Scott Steiner (judge) =

American judge from California

Scott A. Steiner (born October 1973) is a Judge of the Orange County Superior Court in California, former deputy district attorney, former chairman of the Orange Planning Commission, and former adjunct professor of California evidence and criminal procedure at Chapman University School of Law. He is the son of former Orange County Board of Supervisors Chairman William G. Steiner.

== Education and early career ==
Steiner graduated with honors from the University of California, Irvine in 1996 with a bachelor's degree in political science. He attended law school at the University of California, Hastings College of the Law, in San Francisco, from which he graduated in 1999, and where while on the law review published his student note, “Case Management Orders: Use and Efficacy in Complex Litigation and the Toxic Tort” in the Hastings Environmental Law Journal. Steiner grew up in a political family and credits his father, former Orange County Board of Supervisors Chairman William G. Steiner, for influencing his career choice.

In December 1999, Steiner began work as a Deputy District Attorney in the Orange County District Attorney's Office. In 2005, he was selected by District Attorney Tony Rackauckas to serve as head of the Hate Crime Unit of that Office. In that capacity, he published the article “Habitations of Cruelty: Pitfalls of Expanding Hate Crime Legislation to Include Homelessness” in Thomson Reuters Criminal Law Bulletin. In 2008, Steiner was promoted to the Gang Unit. In that same year, he began teaching as an adjunct professor of California Evidence at Chapman Law School.

== Election to the Orange County Superior Court ==
On June 8, 2010, Steiner won election to the Orange County Superior Court of California. He was elected without opposition, becoming at age 36 one of the youngest elected Superior Court Judges in California. He succeeded Judge Margaret Anderson, who endorsed him and supported his campaign efforts. Steiner assumed office on January 3, 2011. On June 7, 2016, Steiner was re-elected by a wide margin. He was sworn into a second term on January 3, 2017. Steiner was re-elected to a third term without opposition in February 2022.

== Misconduct and censure ==
In September 2014, Steiner was censured by the California Commission on Judicial Performance for engaging in sexual activity with two women in his chambers. Following an investigation, the commission stated that “consensual sexual behavior in the courthouse is the height of irresponsible and improper behavior by a judge," - a conclusion with which Steiner wholly agreed, and for which he apologized. Following his censure, Steiner remains active on the bench, and was re-elected on June 7, 2016, with broad support from the legal and political communities.

== Personal ==
Steiner married fellow University of California, Irvine alum, Caron Tam, in 1998 and they have two children. He is an enthusiastic distance runner, and is often seen at ultra-marathons throughout the state.
