= John Moorlach =

American politician (born 1955)

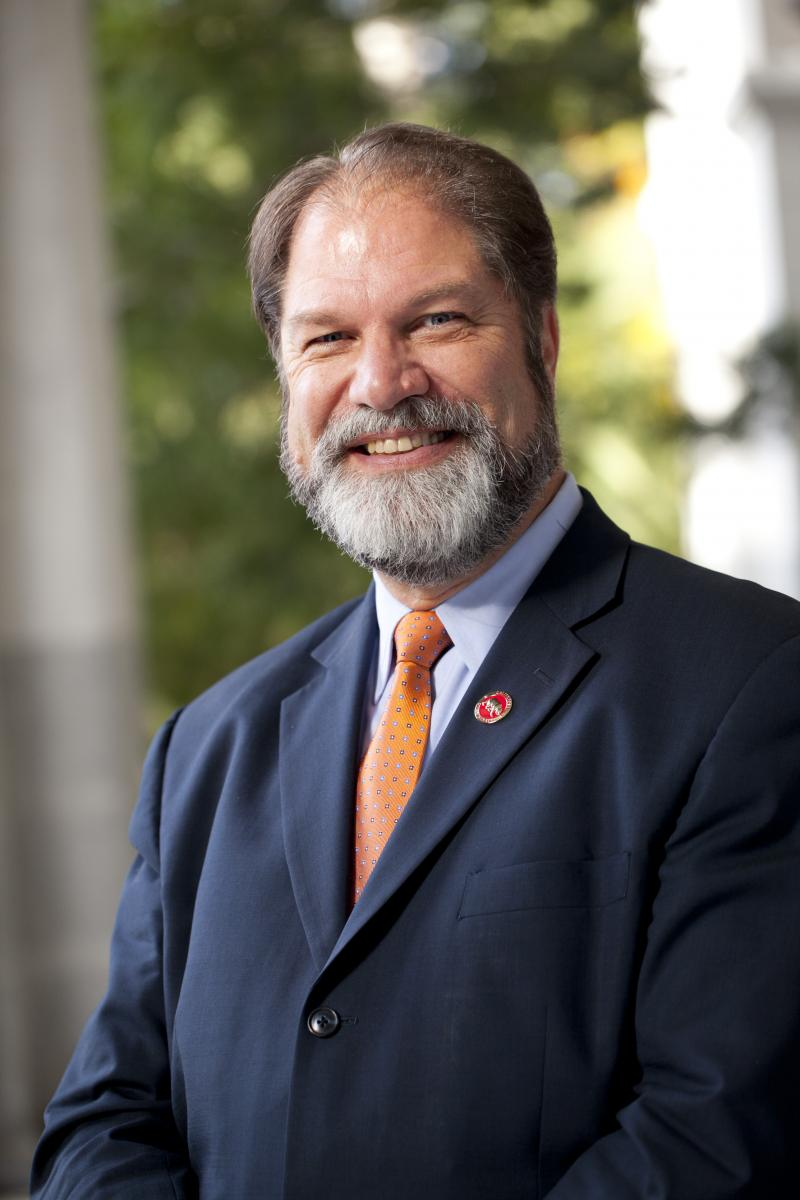
- Official portrait, c. 2015–2016

Member of the California State Senate from the 37th district
- In office March 22, 2015 – November 30, 2020
- Preceded by: Mimi Walters
- Succeeded by: Dave Min

Chair of the Orange County Board of Supervisors
- In office January 12, 2012 – January 8, 2013
- Preceded by: Bill Campbell
- Succeeded by: Shawn Nelson
- In office January 8, 2008 – January 13, 2009
- Preceded by: Chris Norby
- Succeeded by: Patricia C. Bates

Member of the Orange County Board of Supervisors from the 2nd district
- In office December 5, 2006 – January 5, 2015
- Preceded by: Jim Silva
- Succeeded by: Michelle Steel

Personal details
- Born: Johannes Meindert Willem Moorlach; December 21, 1955 (age 70) Groningen, Netherlands
- Party: Republican
- Spouse: Trina Lehmaier
- Children: 3
- Education: California State University, Long Beach (BS)
- Website: Campaign website

Johannes Meindert Willem Moorlach (born December 21, 1955) is an American politician who served as a member of the California State Senate representing 37th Senate district, which includes portions of Orange County, from 2015 to 2020. He was narrowly defeated for reelection by Dave Min in 2020; he lost a 2021 special election to return to the Orange County Board of Supervisors; he withdrew from the 2022 election for Orange County Auditor-Controller; and he lost the 2022 election for Mayor of Costa Mesa. A Republican, he previously served on the Orange County Board of Supervisors from December 5, 2006, to January 5, 2015, and as Orange County Treasurer–Tax Collector from March 17, 1995, to December 5, 2006.

== Early life and education ==
Johannes Meindert Willem Moorlach was born in Groningen, Netherlands, and came with his family to the United States when he was four years old. He grew up in Cypress, California, and Buena Park, California. He earned his Bachelor of Science degree in business administration from the California State University, Long Beach in 1977. He is a certified public accountant and certified financial planner. Before entering public office, he was vice president of accounting firm Balser, Horowitz, Frank and Wakeling, and the administrative partner of its Costa Mesa office.

== Political career ==
=== Orange County Treasurer–Tax Collector (1995–2006) ===
Moorlach first came to public attention by predicting the largest municipal bond portfolio loss and bankruptcy in U.S. history while campaigning for the office of Orange County Treasurer–Tax Collector against incumbent Democrat Robert Citron in 1994. Citron resigned later that year and was replaced on an interim basis by Tom Daxon. On March 17, 1995, Moorlach was appointed to fill the vacancy. In 1996 he was elected by the voters to complete the unexpired term, and re-elected in 1998 and 2002, serving nearly twelve years. He left office on December 5, 2006 and was succeeded by Chriss Street.

He is recognized as a leading expert on municipal bankruptcies.

=== Orange County Supervisor (2006–2015) ===
In 2006, he opted not to run for re-election as Treasurer–Tax Collector and instead ran for Orange County Supervisor, winning 70% of the vote. Moorlach was unopposed for re-election in 2010.

While on the Board of Supervisors, he served on the Orange County Transportation Authority, OC LAFCO, CalOptima, and Southern California Regional Airport Authority boards.

He was succeeded on the board by Michelle Steel and ran in the 2021 special election to succeed her following her election to the US House. He lost to Democrat Katrina Foley.

=== California State Senate (2015–2020) ===
In 2013, Moorlach announced his candidacy for the United States House of Representatives seat being vacated by John Campbell, but dropped out shortly before the deadline to file candidacy. The Congressional seat was won by state Senator Mimi Walters. Moorlach won the special election to succeed her in the state Senate with 50.3% of the vote, defeating state Assemblyman Donald P. Wagner, a fellow Republican who won 44.0% of the vote.

In 2019, Moorlach introduced a bill to expand Interstate 5 and State Highway 99 with two additional lanes. The proposal also included the repeal of speed limits on those two roads. The bill mandated a report be delivered by January 1, 2021, which has not occurred.

In the fall of 2020, Moorloch lost his bid for re-election to Democrat Dave Min. Moorlach later filed papers to run for his old seat on the Orange County Board of Supervisors.

=== Failed bids to return to office ===
After losing his Senate re-election bid in 2020, Moorlach made several failed attempts to return to office:

- Losing a March 2021 special election for his former seat on the Orange County Board of Supervisors
- Withdrawing from the March 2022 election for Orange County Auditor-Controller amid charges that he did not meet the legal qualifications to hold the office
- Losing the November 2022 election for Mayor of Costa Mesa, California

== Personal life ==
Murloch and his wife have three children.

== Electoral history ==
Orange County Treasurer–Tax Collector election, 1994
Party	Candidate	Votes	%
Democratic	Robert Citron (incumbent)	209,630	61.05%
Republican	John Moorlach	133,754	38.95%
Total votes		343,384	100%
Democratic hold			

Orange County Treasurer–Tax Collector election, 1996
Party	Candidate	Votes	%
Republican	John Moorlach (incumbent)	347,260	100%
Total votes		347,260	100%
Republican hold			

Orange County Treasurer–Tax Collector election, 1998
Party	Candidate	Votes	%
Republican	John Moorlach (incumbent)	319,350	100%
Total votes		319,350	100%
Republican hold			

Orange County Treasurer–Tax Collector election, 2002
Party	Candidate	Votes	%
Republican	John Moorlach (incumbent)	395,772	100%
Total votes		395,772	100%
Republican hold			

Orange County's 2nd Supervisorial district election, 2006
Party	Candidate	Votes	%
Republican	John Moorlach	62,248	69.62%
Republican	David Shawver	27,164	30.38%
Total votes		89,412	100%
Republican hold			

Orange County's 2nd Supervisorial district election, 2010
Party	Candidate	Votes	%
Republican	John Moorlach (incumbent)	86,265	100%
Total votes		86,265	100%
Republican hold			

California's 37th State Senate district special election, 2015
Party	Candidate	Votes	%
Republican	John Moorlach	38,125	50.26%
Republican	Donald P. Wagner	33,411	44.05%
Republican	Naz Namazi	2,621	3.46%
Democratic	Louise Stewardson (write-in)	1,696	2.24%
Total votes		75,853	100%
Republican hold			

California's 37th State Senate district election, 2016
Primary election
Party	Candidate	Votes	%
Republican	John Moorlach (incumbent)	114,540	54.83%
Democratic	Ari Grayson	94,369	45.17%
Total votes		208,909	100%
General election
Republican	John Moorlach (incumbent)	228,480	56.99%
Democratic	Ari Grayson	172,455	43.01%
Total votes		400,935	100%
Republican hold			

California's 37th State Senate district election, 2020
Primary election
Party	Candidate	Votes	%
Republican	John Moorlach (incumbent)	132,275	47.32%
Democratic	Dave Min	78,293	28.01%
Democratic	Katrina Foley	68,952	24.67%
Total votes		279,520	100%
General election
Democratic	Dave Min	270,522	51.14%
Republican	John Moorlach (incumbent)	258,421	48.86%
Total votes		528,943	100%
Democratic gain from Republican			

Orange County's 2nd Supervisorial district special election, 2021
Party	Candidate	Votes	%
Democratic	Katrina Foley	48,346	43.77%
Republican	John Moorlach	34,747	31.46%
Republican	Kevin Muldoon	12,773	11.56%
Republican	Michael Vo	9,886	8.95%
Democratic	Janet Rappaport	4,695	4.25%
Total votes		110,447	100%
Democratic gain from Republican			

Costa Mesa Mayor election, 2022
Party	Candidate	Votes	%
Democratic	John Stephens (incumbent)	17,297	54.68%
Republican	John Moorlach	14,336	45.32%
Total votes		31,633	100%
Democratic hold			

Political offices
Preceded by Chris Norby	Chair of the Orange County Board of Supervisors; 2008–2009	Succeeded by Patricia C. Bates
Preceded by Bill Campbell	Chair of the Orange County Board of Supervisors; 2012–2013	Succeeded by Shawn Nelson
