= William G. Steiner =

American social worker and politician (1937–2022)

William G. Steiner (April 26, 1937 – December 15, 2022) was an American politician, children's advocate and nationally recognized expert on child abuse and neglect. In politics, he was a chairman of the Orange County Board of Supervisors, city councilman for Orange, California, and an Orange Unified School District school board member. He was the founder of both the Orangewood Children's Home, located in Orange, California, and the Good Samaritan Boy's Home, in Corona, California. In addition to his numerous positions as a public official and child advocate in the non-profit sector, he served 16 years on the board of directors for the National Center for Missing and Exploited Children, based in Alexandria, Virginia.

== Education and early career ==
Born in Sibley, Iowa, Steiner earned his bachelor's degree in criminology from the University of California, Berkeley, and his master's degree in social work from the University of Southern California.

While still in his twenties, Steiner founded and became the director of the Good Samaritan Boy's home, which expanded over the years to include a number of group homes across California.

== Public service ==
In 1985, the Orangewood Children's Home, a public-private partnership, opened its doors to serve as Orange County's transitional shelter for children, after Steiner led efforts to raise $8.5 million for the facility. Steiner served as executive director of the Orangewood Foundation, which over the years has raised over $20 million to address problems of child abuse and neglect in Orange County.

California Governor George Deukmejian appointed Steiner to the State Child Development Programs Advisory Committee in 1986, and from 1990 to 1998 he served as a policy advisor to the Cabinet Secretary for Child Development and Education in the Administration of Governor Pete Wilson. He has taught political science at the University of California, Irvine, Public Policy at the University of Southern California, and child abuse courses at Chapman University. Steiner has also worked with the California Youth Authority, the Los Angeles Department of Adoptions, Metropolitan State Hospital, and various residential treatment agencies serving abused and neglected children.

Steiner served as a delegate from the United States to Poland, Czechoslovakia and the former Soviet Union in 1991.

== Orange County supervisor ==
In 1993, Steiner was appointed to the Orange County Board of Supervisors, by Governor Pete Wilson, to serve out the term of incumbent Don Roth, who had resigned after a scandal involving a criminal probe into gifts accepted from local real estate developers and corporate lobbyists. In 1994, Steiner was subsequently elected to a four-year term for January 1995 through January 1999, serving as chairman of the board for 1997. During his tenure, Steiner helped lead the county back from financial disaster after it filed for Chapter 9 bankruptcy on December 6, 1994, due to a $1.64-billion collapse in the value of the county's investment portfolio. The bankruptcy was precipitated by investment decisions made largely by Orange County Treasurer-Tax Collector Robert L. Citron. In its wake, Steiner defeated an aborted recall effort.

== Semi-retirement ==
At the end of his elected term on the Orange County board of supervisors, in 1999, Steiner moved to Scottsdale, Arizona for four years to become the national program director for Childhelp USA, serving there until 2003. While in Arizona, Steiner oversaw the conversion of Merv Griffin's 192 acre (0.7 km^{2}) Wickenburg Inn & Dude Ranch, located in Wickenburg, into the Merv Griffin Village of Arizona, a treatment center for abused kids.

Also in 1999, Steiner joined with Florida based partners, Bill Hebrock and Daryl McLaughlin, to form Hebrock Steiner McLaughlin, Inc., a public policy consulting and lobbying firm. Steiner has been involved in business and cultural exchanges with the People's Republic of China, and traveled there frequently to develop public/private partnerships for the firm's clients.

He was also an investor in, and vice chairman of, Zhao International, Inc., an international exporting company which exports scrap metal to Tianjin, China, a sister city of Orange.

Steiner served on the Juvenile Justice Commission for several years, having been appointed by the presiding judge of the Superior Court.

== Personal life and death ==
At the time of his death, Steiner was the father of five children, including Orange County judge Scott Steiner, grandfather of sixteen, and great-grandfather of one.

Steiner died on December 15, 2022, while en route to New York to see a grandson who had just completed graduate school at Cornell University.

On August 5, 2024, a major street in Orange leading to the Orangewood Children's Home, which Steiner built and which Steiner funded by his charitable fundraising efforts, was renamed, “Steiner Way.” At a ceremony attended by city and county officials, and Congressman Lou Correa, civic leaders commemorated Steiner's memory, and his lifelong commitment to vulnerable children.

== Recognition ==
Steiner was named Child Advocate of the Year by the California Court Appointed Advocates, and Citizen of the Year by the City of Orange. In 1989, he was awarded the Commissioner's Award for the Prevention of Child Abuse and Neglect by the US Department of Health and Human Services. In 1992, he was named Outstanding Elected Official by the Orange County Chapter of the American Society of Public Administrators.

In October 2019, Steiner was honored with the Orangewood Foundation's "Crystal Vision" award, acknowledging his lifetime of service to abused and neglected children.

== See also ==
- Child advocacy
