= Katrina Foley =

American politician and attorney

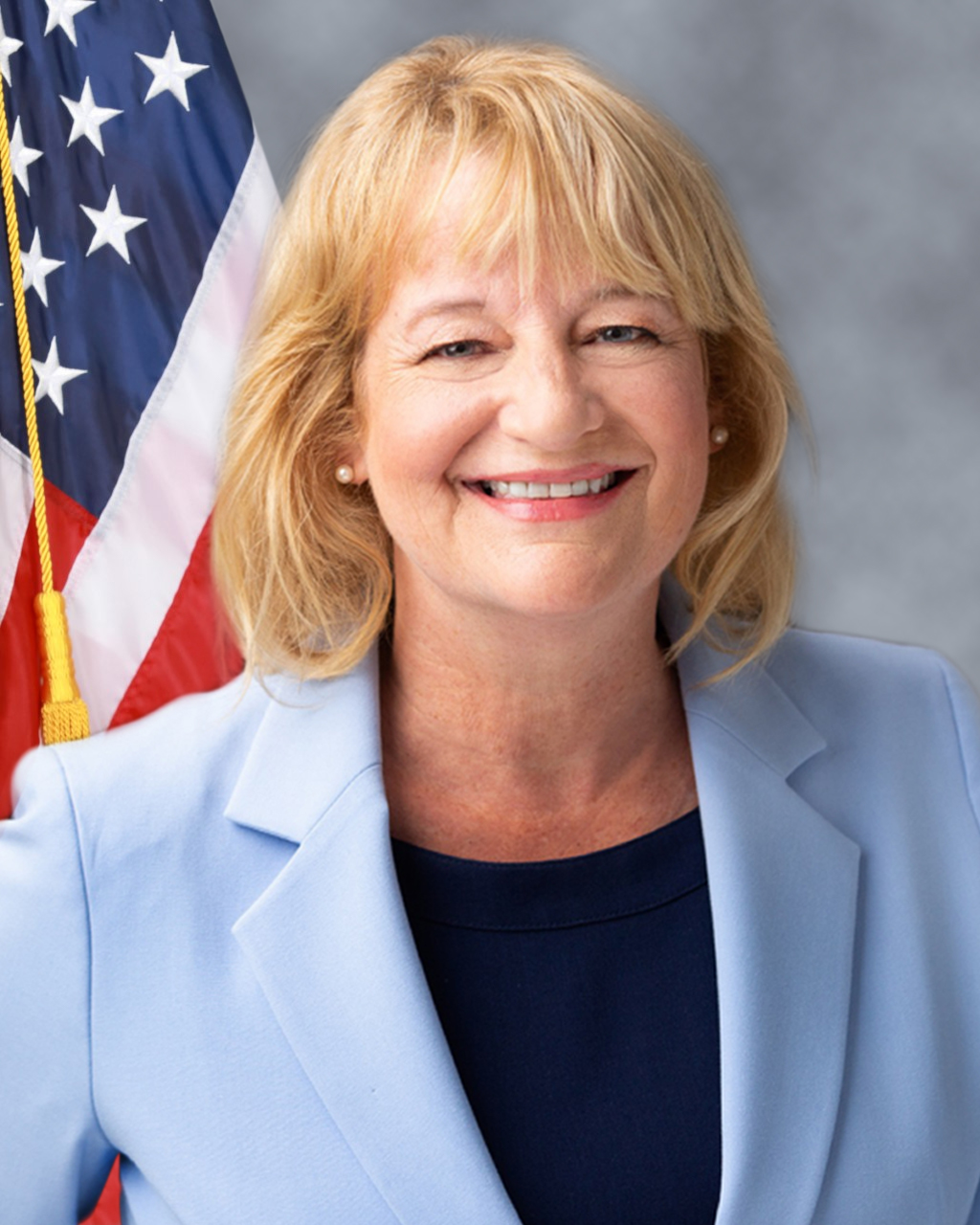
- Official portrait, 2021

Vice Chair of the Orange County Board of Supervisors
- Incumbent
- Assumed office January 14, 2025
- Preceded by: Doug Chaffee

Member of the Orange County Board of Supervisors
- Incumbent
- Assumed office March 26, 2021
- Preceded by: Michelle Steel
- Constituency: 2nd district (2021–2023); 5th district (2023–present)

Mayor of Costa Mesa
- In office December 4, 2018 – March 26, 2021
- Preceded by: Sandra L. Genis
- Succeeded by: John Stephens
- In office December 13, 2016 – November 7, 2017
- Preceded by: Stephen Mensinger
- Succeeded by: Sandra L. Genis

Member of the Costa Mesa City Council
- In office December 2, 2004 – December 14, 2010
- Preceded by: Gary Monahan
- Succeeded by: Stephen Mensinger
- In office December 2, 2014 – December 4, 2018
- Preceded by: Sandra L. Genis
- Succeeded by: Sandra L. Genis

Newport-Mesa Unified School District Board Member, Trustee Area 2
- In office December 14, 2010 – December 2, 2014
- Preceded by: Michael B. Collier
- Succeeded by: Charlene Metoyer

Personal details
- Born: Katrina Anne Foley; July 5, 1967 (age 59) Bakersfield, California, U.S.
- Party: Democratic
- Spouse: Casey
- Children: 2
- Education: University of California, Los Angeles (BA); Seattle University (JD)
- Website: https://www.katrinafoley.com/

Katrina Anne Foley (born July 5, 1967) is an American politician and attorney currently serving as the vice chair of the Orange County Board of Supervisors. Foley first assumed office as a supervisor on March 26, 2021 and has represented the fifth district since 2023. She is chair of the Orange County Housing Finance Trust, and also serves on the boards of the Orange County Transportation Authority and Orange County Fire Authority.

Prior to her victory in a 2021 special election, Foley served as mayor of Costa Mesa, California, where she became the city's first directly elected mayor in 2018. She previously ran an unsuccessful bid for California's 37th State Senate district, placing 3rd in the 2020 primary election with 24.7% of the vote.

Her victory in the special election flipped a seat in the Orange County Board of Supervisors, making her the second Democrat on the board, the other being Doug Chaffee. In 2022, when Foley narrowly won re-election to the board under new district boundaries, a third Democrat also entered the board, flipping control of the Orange County Board of Supervisors from Republican to Democratic. That marked the first time since 1976 in which Democrats had control of the board.

== Early life and education ==
Foley was born in Bakersfield, California. She received a bachelor's degree in English and Women's Studies from UCLA and a Juris Doctor from Seattle University.

== Electoral history ==
=== 2004 ===
Costa Mesa City Council Election, 2004
| Candidate | Votes | % |
|---|---|---|
| Katrina Foley | 13,298 | 15.8 |
| Linda Dixon | 12,599 | 15.0 |
| Eric Bever | 10,139 | 12.0 |
| Bruce Garlich | 10,095 | 12.0 |
| Mike Scheafer | 9,545 | 11.3 |
| Chris Steel | 6,680 | 7.9 |
| Mirna Burciaga | 5,797 | 6.9 |
| Sam Clark | 4,210 | 5.0 |
| Richard (Dick) Carroll | 4,061 | 4.8 |
| Karl H. Ahlf | 3,316 | 3.9 |
| Terry Shaw | 2,936 | 3.5 |
| Michael (Mike) Clifford | 1,540 | 1.8 |
| Total votes | 84,216 | 100 |

=== 2008 ===
Costa Mesa City Council Election, 2008
| Candidate | Votes | % |
|---|---|---|
| Gary Monahan | 17,836 | 21.0 |
| Katrina Foley (incumbent) | 15,912 | 18.8 |
| Eric Bever | 14,857 | 17.5 |
| Jim Righeimer | 13,000 | 15.3 |
| Lisa Reedy | 7,306 | 8.6 |
| Chris McEvoy | 6,828 | 8.0 |
| William Sneen | 4,088 | 4.8 |
| Christopher S. Bunyan | 3,037 | 3.6 |
| Nick Moss | 1,967 | 2.3 |
| Total votes | 84,831 | 100 |

=== 2010 ===
Newport-Mesa Unified School District Trustee Area 2 Election, 2010
| Candidate | Votes | % |
|---|---|---|
| Katrina Foley | 27,096 | 54.4 |
| Michael B. Collier (incumbent) | 22,751 | 45.6 |
| Total votes | 49,847 | 100 |

=== 2014 ===
Costa Mesa City Council Election, 2014
| Candidate | Votes | % |
|---|---|---|
| Katrina Foley | 9,346 | 26.5 |
| Jim Righeimer (incumbent) | 7,524 | 21.3 |
| Jay Humphrey | 7,477 | 21.2 |
| Lee Ramos | 5,305 | 15.0 |
| Tony Capitelli | 1,856 | 5.3 |
| Al Melone | 1,470 | 4.2 |
| Rita Louise Simpson | 1,200 | 3.4 |
| Christopher Scott Bunyan | 1,108 | 3.1 |
| Total votes | 35,286 | 100 |

=== 2018 ===
City of Costa Mesa mayoral election, 2018
| Candidate | Votes | % |
|---|---|---|
| Katrina Foley | 20,568 | 59.5% |
| Sandra Genis | 14,018 | 40.5% |
| Total votes | 34,586 | 100% |

=== 2020 ===
2020 California's 37th State Senate district primary election
Primary election
| Party | Candidate | Votes | % |
|---|---|---|---|
| Republican | John Moorlach (incumbent) | 132,275 | 47.3 |
| Democratic | Dave Min | 78,293 | 28.0 |
| Democratic | Katrina Foley | 68,952 | 24.7 |
| Total votes | | 279,520 | 100.0 |

=== 2021 ===
2021 Orange County Board of Supervisors 2nd district special election
| Party | Candidate | Votes | % |
|---|---|---|---|
| Democratic | Katrina Foley | 48,346 | 43.8 |
| Republican | John Moorlach | 34,747 | 31.5 |
| Republican | Kevin Muldoon | 12,773 | 11.6 |
| Republican | Michael Vo | 9,886 | 9.0 |
| Democratic | Janet Rappaport | 4,695 | 4.3 |
| Total votes | | 110,447 | 100.0 |
| Democratic gain from Republican | | | |

=== 2022 ===
2022 Orange County Board of Supervisors 5th district general election
| Party | Candidate | Votes | % |
|---|---|---|---|
| Democratic | Katrina Foley (incumbent) | 64,888 | 41.8 |
| Republican | Patricia Bates | 34,467 | 22.2 |
| Republican | Diane Harkey | 28,809 | 18.5 |
| Republican | Kevin Muldoon | 27,229 | 17.5 |
| Total votes | | 155,393 | 100.0 |

2022 Orange County Board of Supervisors 5th district runoff election
| Party | Candidate | Votes | % |
|---|---|---|---|
| Democratic | Katrina Foley (incumbent) | 116,105 | 51.3% |
| Republican | Patricia Bates | 110,238 | 48.7% |
| Total votes | | 226,343 | 100.0% |
| Democratic gain from Republican | | | |

=== 2026 ===
2026 Orange County Board of Supervisors 5th district general election
| Party | Candidate | Votes | % |
|---|---|---|---|
| Democratic | Katrina Foley (incumbent) | 85,104 | 47.0 |
| Republican | Diane Dixon | 84,777 | 46.8 |
| Republican | Lucy Vellema | 11,244 | 6.2 |
| Total votes | | 181,125 | 100.0 |

2026 Orange County Board of Supervisors 5th district runoff election
| Party | Candidate | Votes | % |
|---|---|---|---|
| Democratic | Katrina Foley (incumbent) | 127,543 | 52.63% |
| Republican | Diane Dixon | 114,818 | 47.37% |
| Total votes | | 242,361 | 100.0% |
| Democratic hold | | | |
