= Orange County Labor Federation =

Labor council of local unions

OCLF
- Orange County Labor Federation
- Headquarters: Orange, California
- Members: 200,000
- Key people: Gilbert Davila, president
- Website: www.oclabor.org

The Orange County Labor Federation (OCLF) is a labor council of local unions operating in Orange County, California. It represents at least 90 local unions that have a combined membership of more than 200,000 members. The federation's stated purpose is to advance the interests of working people; it regularly endorses candidates in local elections.
