= Lisa Bartlett =

American politician

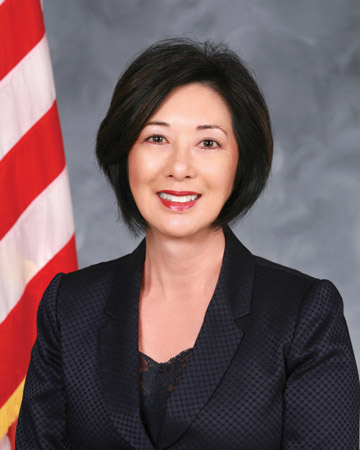

Member of the South Orange County Community College District Board of Trustees Area 3
- Incumbent
- Assumed office December 13, 2024

Member of the Orange County Board of Supervisors from the 5th district
- In office December 1, 2014 – January 2, 2023
- Preceded by: Patricia Bates
- Succeeded by: Katrina Foley (redistricted)

Chair of the Orange County Board of Supervisors
- In office January 8, 2019 – January 14, 2020
- Preceded by: Andrew Do
- Succeeded by: Michelle Steel
- In office January 12, 2016 – January 10, 2017
- Preceded by: Todd Spitzer
- Succeeded by: Michelle Steel

Vice Chair of the Orange County Board of Supervisors
- In office January 13, 2015 – January 12, 2016
- Preceded by: Todd Spitzer
- Succeeded by: Michelle Steel

Member of the Dana Point, California City Council
- In office December 2006 – December 2014

Mayor of Dana Point, California
- In office December 2013 – December 2014
- In office December 2008 – December 2009

Personal details
- Born: Lisa Sato Culver City, California, U.S.
- Party: Republican
- Education: University of California, Irvine; California State University, Fullerton (BA); Pepperdine University (MBA)

Lisa A. Bartlett (née Sato) is an American politician and former businesswoman. She was elected to the board of trustees of the South Orange County Community College District in 2024. Bartlett is the former Orange County supervisor for district 5. Bartlett is the former mayor of Dana Point, California. She is a Republican.

== Early life and education ==
Bartlett was born in Culver City, and moved to Orange County when she was three years old. She is of Japanese descent.

Bartlett earned a Bachelor of Arts in Finance from California State University, Fullerton and an MBA from Pepperdine University.

== Political career ==
Prior to a political career, Bartlett held executive management positions at a computer software company. She also worked for a project management consulting firm and several law firms. She is a licensed Real Estate Broker.

=== Dana Point City Council ===
Bartlett's political career started in 2006, when she was elected to the Dana Point city council. She was reelected to a second term in 2010 and for two years she was mayor (in 2009 and in 2014).

=== Orange County Board of Supervisors ===
In 2014, she ran for the fifth district seat on the Orange County board of supervisors. She finished in second place in the June primary but defeated Laguna Niguel city councilman Robert Ming in the November runoff. In 2018, she was re-elected, having run unopposed.

She served as chair of the Orange County board of supervisors in 2016 and 2019.

=== U.S. House campaign ===
On January 3, 2022, Bartlett announced that she would be a candidate for the United States House of Representatives in California's 49th congressional district, running against incumbent Democrat Mike Levin. She finished third in the nonpartisan primary, behind Levin and former San Juan Capistrano Mayor Brian Maryott, and did not advance to the general election.
