= Robert Citron =

Former Orange County, California Treasurer-Tax Collector

Treasurer-Tax Collector of Orange County, California
- In office 1970–1994

Personal details
- Born: April 14, 1925
- Died: January 16, 2013 (aged 87)
- Party: Democratic Party
- Education: University of Southern California (did not graduate)

Robert Lafee Citron (April 14, 1925 – January 16, 2013) was the longtime Treasurer-Tax Collector of Orange County, California, when it declared Chapter 9 bankruptcy on December 6, 1994. The bankruptcy was brought on by Citron's investment strategies, which seemed to be an effort to earn high incomes for the county, without raising taxes, through risky, leveraged positions in bonds. The strategy paid out at first. In 1994, a cash crunch occurred when interest rates increased and financiers for the county required increased collateral from the county. It was later revealed that Citron relied upon a mail-order astrologer and a psychic for interest rate predictions as the county's finances began to falter.

== Early life ==
Born in Los Angeles, Citron grew up in Burbank and Hemet. His father, Jesse, was the doctor who put an end to alcoholic W. C. Fields's love of scotch. He attended the University of Southern California but did not graduate. In 1960 he was hired by the Tax Collection department of Orange County, throughout the years he was promoted and by the time he ran for election was department supervisor. He ran for the elected position of Tax Collector in 1970 where he won. Three years later Orange County would merge the offices of tax collector and treasurer and this is when Citron's title became Treasurer-Tax Collector.

== Treasurer-Tax Collector ==
Citron controlled several Orange County funds including the General Fund, the Investment Pool, and the treasury Commingled Pool. He sent out the county's tax bills with catchy slogans, such as "Taxes paid on time never draw fines." He won re-election seven times; in his last election victory, his opponent, John Moorlach, charged that his handsome gains were the result of risky betting.

As controller of the various Orange County funds, Citron had taken a highly leveraged position using repurchase agreements (repos) and floating rate notes (FRNs). The loss incurred by the use of these financial instruments reached the amount of $2 billion and was caused by being too highly leveraged for rising federal interest rates. In other words, if federal interest rates had not risen, the massive trading position would have been a substantially profitable position; if interest rates did rise, the trading position would result in substantial losses. In fact, rates rose.

The Orange County funds, managed by Citron, were worth $8 billion. However, Citron went out to the repo market and leveraged the County Pools to amounts ranging from 158% to over 292%. To obtain this degree of leverage, he used treasury bonds as collateral. Profits of the fund were excessive for a period of time and Citron resorted to concealing the excess earnings. He pleaded guilty to improperly transferring securities from the Orange County General Fund to the Orange County Treasury Commingled Pool.

== County bankruptcy ==
Although regulators and the county's financial counterparties had already begun scrutinizing Citron's risky investment strategy as early as 1992, following an article in the trade publication, Derivatives Week, the county's finances did not begin to unravel until early 1994. At that time, the Federal Reserve Bank began to raise US interest rates, causing many securities in Orange County's investment pools to fall in value. As a result, dealers were requesting extra margin payments from Orange County. These extra margin payments were funded in part by another $600 million of municipal bonds issued by Orange County. However, this fix proved to be only temporary. In December 1994, Credit Suisse First Boston (CSFB) realized what was going on, and blocked the "rolling over" of $1.25 billion in repos ("rollover" essentially means issuing another repo when the previous one ends, but at the new prevailing interest rate). At that point some claim that Orange County was left with no recourse other than to file for bankruptcy. While the county was in bankruptcy, every one of its program budgets was cut, about 3,000 public employees were discharged, and all services were reduced.

Financial scholar John C. Hull later described the incident as "the classic example" of an institution initially earning a profit through risky trades, becoming complacent about risk as a result, and then making disastrous losses.

== Criminal conviction ==
Facing 14 years in prison, Citron pleaded guilty to six felony counts and three special enhancements. Charges also included filing a false and misleading financial summary to participants purchasing securities in the Orange County Treasury Investment Pool. Citron was sentenced to one year of work release and five years of supervised probation, and performed 1,000 hours of community service. He served a year in prison, where he was allowed to work in the commissary.

== Death ==
Citron died at the age of 87 on January 16, 2013.

== See also ==
- List of Ig Nobel Prize winners
- List of trading losses
