= Orange Park Acres, California =

Unincorporated community in Orange County, California, United States

- Unincorporated community Census designated place
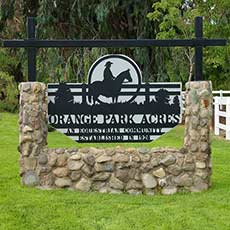
- Orange Park Acres entrance

- Location within California Location within the United States
- Coordinates: 33°48′07″N 117°46′53″W
- Country: United States
- State: California
- County: Orange
- Time zone: UTC-8 (PST)
  - Summer (DST): UTC-7 (PDT)
- ZIP code: 92869
- Area code: 714
- Website: Orange Park Acres community association

Orange Park Acres is an unincorporated community and census designated place (CDP) surrounded by the city of Orange in Orange County, California. Orange Park Acres is bounded loosely by the tops of the hills as seen from the valley to the west (toward the City of Orange), Santiago Creek to the north, the holding basin behind the dam, the cemetery and Irvine Park to the east, and the top of the hills across Chapman as seen from the valley to the south. It comprises approximately 5,500 residents and is about 1.4 square miles (3.6 km^{2}) in size. Almost all the homes in this county island are set on lots of 20,000 square feet (2,000 m^{2}), a minimum requirement for this sector of Orange County. Most residents in the area are upper-middle-class or wealthy. It has several equestrian areas, and many stables throughout the community. The area has one shopping center and is adjacent to Santiago Canyon College. The ZIP Code is 92869, and the community is inside area code 714.

== History ==
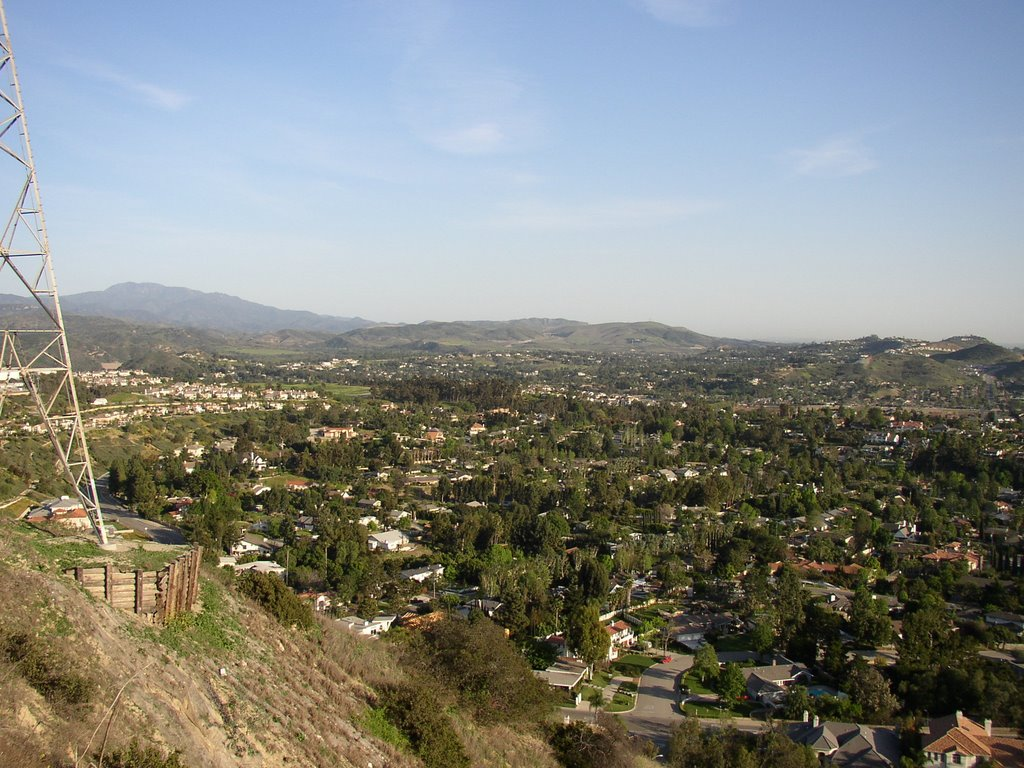
Orange Park Acres canyon/panoramic view

Orange Park Acres was founded in 1928 as the official equestrian destination of Orange County. Much of that historical heritage can be observed through the lack of sidewalks and street lights in many areas, as well as the abundance of fenced horse trails.

The community was placed under mandatory evacuation during the Windy Ridge fire in 2007, a blaze that scorched the unincorporated areas surrounding Anaheim Hills and Orange Park Acres. In total, the blaze damaged 2,036 acres (824 ha)

and resulted in the scorching of over half the Weir Canyon Regional Park, as well as the evacuation of several homes in both Orange Park Acres and Anaheim Hills.

== Demographics ==
Orange Park Acres was listed as a census designated place as of November 2024.

== See also ==
- Orange Park Acres community association
