= Orange County Board of Supervisors =

Five-member governing body of Orange County, California

Type
- Type: Board of Supervisors
- Term limits: 2 terms (8 years)

Leadership
- Chair: Doug Chaffee (D) since January 14, 2025
- Vice Chair: Katrina Foley (D) since January 14, 2025

Structure
- Seats: 5
- Political groups: Officially nonpartisan: Democratic (3); Republican (2)
- Length of term: 4 years

Elections
- Voting system: Two-round system
- Last election: November 5, 2024
- Next election: November 3, 2026

Map of Orange County's Supervisorial Districts

The Orange County Board of Supervisors is the five-member governing body of Orange County, California, along with being the executive of the county.

== Membership ==
The board consists of five supervisors elected by districts to four-year terms by the citizens of Orange County. The supervisors represent districts of approximately 600,000 people.

Supervisorial elections take place during the primary election, with run-off elections (if necessary) in November. Supervisorial terms begin the first Monday after January 1 after the election. Vacancies on the board are filled via special election since Orange County voters adopted a county charter in March 2002. Prior to the adoption of the charter, vacancies on the board were filled by appointment by the governor of California. The December 1996 appointment of Laguna Niguel City Councilman Thomas W. Wilson by Governor Pete Wilson (no relation) was the last time that a gubernatorial appointment was used to fill a supervisorial vacancy (Supervisor Marian Bergeson had resigned to become the California Secretary for Education). The January 2003 special election of former State Assemblyman Bill Campbell was the first time that a special election was used to fill a supervisorial vacancy (Supervisor Todd Spitzer had resigned after he was elected to the State Assembly to replace the term-limited Campbell).

The current members of the board of supervisors are:

- District 1: Janet Nguyen, Republican (since December 4, 2024; previously March 27, 2007 – December 1, 2014)
- District 2: Vicente Sarmiento, Democrat (since January 10, 2023)
- District 3: Donald P. Wagner, Republican (since March 27, 2019)
- District 4: Doug Chaffee, Democrat (since January 7, 2019)
- District 5: Katrina Foley, Democrat (since March 26, 2021)

== Functions ==
The board makes decisions relating to land use, public utilities, and transportation, both directly and indirectly through its power over budgets and appointments to boards, committees, and commissions. Services that are ultimately managed by the board include regional parks, water, sewers, animal control, buses, freeways, and commuter rail.

== Supervisorial Districts ==
=== 2012–2022 ===
The First Supervisorial District consists of the cities of Garden Grove, Santa Ana, and Westminster, the unincorporated community of Midway City, and the northernmost three square miles of the city of Fountain Valley north of Warner Avenue, including Mile Square Regional Park.

The Second Supervisorial District consists of the cities of Costa Mesa, Cypress, Huntington Beach, La Palma, Los Alamitos, Newport Beach, Seal Beach, and Stanton, along with two-thirds of the city of Fountain Valley that are south of Warner Avenue and southwestern portions of the City of Buena Park. It also includes the unincorporated area of Rossmoor.

The Third Supervisorial District consists of the cities of Orange, Tustin, Villa Park, and Yorba Linda, most of the City of Irvine, as well as the Anaheim Hills area in the city of Anaheim. It also includes the unincorporated areas of El Modena, MCAS El Toro, Modjeska Canyon, Olive, Orange Park Acres, Santiago Canyon, Silverado, Trabuco Canyon, and Tustin Foothills.

The Fourth Supervisorial District consists of the cities of Brea, Fullerton, La Habra, Placentia, the portions of the city of Anaheim outside of Anaheim Hills, and most of Buena Park.

The Fifth Supervisorial District consists of the cities of Aliso Viejo, Dana Point, Laguna Beach, Laguna Hills, Laguna Niguel, Laguna Woods, Lake Forest, Mission Viejo, Rancho Santa Margarita, San Clemente, and San Juan Capistrano, along with small southwestern portions of the City of Irvine, as well as the unincorporated areas of Coto de Caza, Ladera Ranch, and Las Flores.

=== 2002–2012 ===
The First Supervisorial District consisted of the cities of Santa Ana and Westminster, as well as the eastern half of the city of Garden Grove.

The Second Supervisorial District consisted of the cities of Costa Mesa, Cypress, Fountain Valley, Huntington Beach, La Palma, Los Alamitos, Newport Beach, Seal Beach, and Stanton, as well as the western half of the city of Garden Grove. It also includes the unincorporated areas of Rossmoor, Sunset Beach, and Surfside.

The Third Supervisorial District consisted of the cities of Brea, Irvine, Orange, Tustin, Villa Park, and Yorba Linda, as well as the Anaheim Hills area in the city of Anaheim. It also includes the unincorporated areas of El Modena, MCAS El Toro, Modjeska Canyon, Olive, Orange Park Acres, Santiago Canyon, Silverado, Trabuco Canyon, and Tustin Foothills.

The Fourth Supervisorial District consisted of the cities of Buena Park, Fullerton, La Habra, Placentia, as well as the portions of the city of Anaheim outside of Anaheim Hills.

The Fifth Supervisorial District consisted of the cities of Aliso Viejo, Dana Point, Laguna Beach, Laguna Hills, Laguna Niguel, Laguna Woods, Lake Forest, Mission Viejo, Rancho Santa Margarita, San Clemente, San Juan Capistrano, as well as the unincorporated areas of Coto de Caza, Ladera Ranch, and Las Flores.

== Special elections ==
Since voters adopted Measure V, the creation of the county charter, in March 2002, vacancies on the Board of Supervisors have been filled by special election.

=== January 28, 2003, Third District special election ===
Orange County Board of Supervisors special election, 2003
- January 28, 2003

1 of 5 seats to the Orange County Board of Supervisors
	Majority party
Party	Republican
Last election	5
Seats before	5
Seats won	1
Seats after	5
Seat change	Steady

The first special election used to fill a vacancy on the Orange County Board of Supervisors was held on January 28, 2003. Third District Supervisor Todd Spitzer had resigned on November 19, 2002, in preparation for taking office as a member of the California State Assembly on December 2 to replace the term-limited Bill Campbell. Campbell, in turn, easily won the special election to fill the remaining two years of Spitzer's term.

Candidate	Votes	Percent
Bill Campbell	26,206	74.6%
Jim Potts	4,692	13.4%
Douglas Boeckler	2,085	5.9%
William A. Wetzel	1,548	4.4%
Robert Louis Douglas	585	1.7%

=== February 6, 2007, First District special election ===
Orange County Board of Supervisors special election, 2007
- February 6, 2007

1 of 5 seats to the Orange County Board of Supervisors
	Majority party
Party	Republican
Last election	5
Seats before	5
Seats won	1
Seats after	5
Seat change	Steady

The second special election used to fill a vacancy on the Orange County Board of Supervisors was held on February 6, 2007. First District Supervisor Lou Correa had resigned on December 4, 2006, when he took office as a member of the California State Senate to replace the term-limited Joe Dunn.

Garden Grove City Councilwoman Janet Nguyen won the special election to fill the remaining two years of the term by seven votes over Garden Grove Unified School District Boardmember Trung Nguyen (no relation) after a protracted recount battle (ironically, Correa had defeated Assemblywoman Lynn Daucher for the Senate seat after a protracted recount battle, as well). Both Nguyens had unexpectedly finished ahead of the front-runners, recently retired State Assemblyman Tom Umberg and Santa Ana City Councilman Carlos Bustamante.

Candidate	Votes	Percent
Janet Nguyen	10,919	24.1%
Trung Nguyen	10,912	24.1%
Tom Umberg	9,725	21.4%
Carlos Bustamante	7,460	16.5%
Mark Rosen	2,181	4.8%
Brett Elliott Franklin	1,739	3.8%
Kermit Marsh	1,335	2.9%
Larry Phan	417	0.9%
Lupe Moreno	383	0.8%
Benny Diaz	273	0.6%

=== June 8, 2010, Fourth District special election ===
Orange County Board of Supervisors special election, 2010
- June 8, 2010

1 of 5 seats to the Orange County Board of Supervisors
	Majority party
Party	Republican
Last election	5
Seats before	5
Seats won	1
Seats after	5
Seat change	Steady

The third special election used to fill a vacancy on the Orange County Board of Supervisors was held on June 8, 2010, and was consolidated with the regular primary election for the next term for the seat. Fourth District Supervisor Chris Norby had resigned on January 29, 2010, when he took office as a member of the California State Assembly to replace Mike Duvall, who had resigned from the Assembly in the wake of a lobbyist sex scandal.

Fullerton City Councilman Shawn Nelson won the seat by 12% over Anaheim City Councilman Harry Sidhu. While Nelson won the special election to fill the remaining seven months of Norby's term, the special election was consolidated with the regular primary election, so Nelson and Sidhu advanced to a November run-off election to win the four-year term due to begin in January 2011. Nelson won the election for the 2011–2015 term by a 63%–37% margin, and would go on to hold the position until January 2019.

Candidate	Votes	Percent
Shawn Nelson	18,739	30.4%
Harry Sidhu	11,421	18.5%
Lorri Galloway	10,035	16.3%
Art Brown	9,986	16.2%
Rose Marie Espinoza	7,616	12.3%
Richard Faher	3,873	6.3%

=== January 27, 2015, First District special election ===
Orange County Board of Supervisors special election, 2015
- January 27, 2015

1 of 5 seats to the Orange County Board of Supervisors
	Majority party
Party	Republican
Last election	5
Seats before	5
Seats won	1
Seats after	5
Seat change	Steady

The fourth special election used to fill a vacancy on the Orange County Board of Supervisors was held on January 27, 2015. First District Supervisor Janet Nguyen had resigned on December 1, 2014, when she took office as a member of the California State Senate to replace the term-limited Lou Correa. Coincidentally, Nguyen had been elected as First District Supervisor in a February 6, 2007, special election to replace Correa, who had resigned when he took office as a member of the California State Senate to replace the term-limited Joe Dunn.

Former Garden Grove City Councilman Andrew Do, Nguyen's supervisorial Chief of Staff, won the special election to fill the remaining two years of the term by 43 votes over Correa.

Candidate	Votes	Percent
Andrew Do	18,905	39.1%
Lou Correa	18,862	39.0%
Chris Phan	7,857	16.3%
Chuyen Van Nguyen	1,879	3.9%
Lupe Morfin-Moreno	834	1.7%

=== March 12, 2019, Third District special election ===
Orange County Board of Supervisors special election, 2019
- March 12, 2019

1 of 5 seats to the Orange County Board of Supervisors
	Majority party	Minority party
Party	Republican	Democratic
Last election	4	1
Seats before	3	1
Seats won	1	0
Seats after	4	1
Seat change	Steady	Steady

The fifth special election used to fill a vacancy on the Orange County Board of Supervisors was held on March 12, 2019. Third District Supervisor Todd Spitzer had resigned on January 7, 2019, when he took office as District Attorney of Orange County after defeating incumbent Tony Rackauckas.

Irvine Mayor Donald P. Wagner won the seat by 5% over former Congresswoman Loretta Sanchez.

==== Candidates ====
- Donald P. Wagner (Republican)
- Loretta Sanchez (Democratic)
- Kristine "Kris" Murray (Republican)
- Larry Bales (Republican)
- Deborah Pauly (Republican)
- Kim-Thy "Katie" Hoang Bayliss (Republican)
- Katherine Daigle (Republican)

==== Results ====
Orange County Board of Supervisors 3rd district special election, 2019
Candidate	Votes	%
Donald P. Wagner	30,240	42.0
Loretta Sanchez	26,708	37.1
Kristine "Kris" Murray	5,338	7.4
Larry Bales	3,912	5.4
Deborah Pauly	3,847	5.3
Kim-Thy "Katie" Hoang Bayliss	1,366	1.9
Katherine Daigle	597	0.8
Total votes	72,008	100.0

=== March 9, 2021, Second District special election ===
Orange County Board of Supervisors special election, 2021
- March 9, 2021

1 of 5 seats to the Orange County Board of Supervisors
	Majority party	Minority party
Party	Republican	Democratic
Last election	4	1
Seats before	3	1
Seats won	0	1
Seats after	3	2
Seat change	▼1	▲1

The sixth special election used to fill a vacancy on the Orange County Board of Supervisors was held on March 9, 2021. Second District Supervisor Michelle Steel had resigned on January 3, 2021, when she took office as a member of the United States House of Representatives after defeating incumbent Harley Rouda.

Costa Mesa Mayor Katrina Foley won the seat by 12% over former State Senator John Moorlach.

==== Candidates ====
- Katrina Foley (Democratic)
- John Moorlach (Republican)
- Kevin Muldoon (Republican)
- Michael Vo (Republican)
- Janet Rappaport (Democratic)

==== Results ====
Orange County Board of Supervisors 2nd district special election, 2021
Candidate	Votes	%
Katrina Foley	48,346	43.8
John Moorlach	34,747	31.5
Kevin Muldoon	12,773	11.6
Michael Vo	9,886	9.0
Janet Rappaport	4,695	4.3
Total votes	110,447	100.0

== Special districts ==
Following are the special districts managed by the Orange County Board of Supervisors

- Flood control
- Development agency
- Lighting
- County Service Area
- Sewer Maintenance

== Chairs and Vice Chairs ==
Harriett Wieder became the first woman to serve as Vice Chair in 1980 and as Chair in 1984. Patricia C. Bates and Janet Nguyen became the first pair of women to serve as Chair and Vice Chair concurrently in 2009.

Gaddi Vasquez became the first Latino to serve as Vice Chair in 1990 and as Chair in 1991.

Janet Nguyen became the first Asian American to serve as Vice Chair in 2009 and Chair in 2010. Lisa Bartlett and Michelle Steel became the first pair of Asian Americans to serve as Chair and Vice Chair concurrently in 2016.

Year	Chair	Vice Chair
1889	William H. Spurgeon	
1890	William H. Spurgeon	
1891	Joseph Yoch	
1892	Joseph Yoch	
1893	Joseph Yoch	
1894	Joseph Yoch	
1895	Franklin P. Nickey	
1896	Franklin P. Nickey	
1897	Franklin P. Nickey	
1898	Franklin P. Nickey	
1899	Franklin P. Nickey	
1900	Franklin P. Nickey	
1901	Franklin P. Nickey	
1902	Franklin P. Nickey	
1903	David MacMullan	
1904	David MacMullan	
1905	David MacMullan	
1906	David MacMullan	
1907	David MacMullan	
1908	David MacMullan	
1909	David MacMullan	
1910	George W. Angle	
1911	Thomas B. Talbert	
1912	Thomas B. Talbert	
1913	Thomas B. Talbert	
1914	Thomas B. Talbert	
1915	Thomas B. Talbert	
1916	Thomas B. Talbert	
1917	Thomas B. Talbert	
1918	Thomas B. Talbert	
1919	Thomas B. Talbert	
1920	Thomas B. Talbert	
1921	Thomas B. Talbert	
1922	Thomas B. Talbert	
1923	Thomas B. Talbert	
1924	Thomas B. Talbert	
1925	Thomas B. Talbert	
1926	Thomas B. Talbert	
1927	William Schumacher	
1928	William Schumacher	
1929	Willard Smith	
1930	Willard Smith	
1931	John C. Mitchell	
1932	John C. Mitchell	
1933	Willard Smith	
1934	Willard Smith	
1935	John C. Mitchell	
1936	John C. Mitchell	
1937	Willard Smith	
1938	Willard Smith	
1939	Willard Smith	
1940	Willard Smith	
1941	Willis H. Warner	
1942	Willis H. Warner	
1943	Willis H. Warner	
1944	Willis H. Warner	
1945	Willis H. Warner	
1946	Willis H. Warner	
1947	Willard Smith	
1948	Willard Smith	
1949	Willis H. Warner	
1950	Willis H. Warner	
1951	Willis H. Warner	
1952	Willis H. Warner	
1953	Willis H. Warner	
1954	Willis H. Warner	
1955	Willis H. Warner	
1956	Willis H. Warner	
1957	Willis H. Warner	
1958	Willis H. Warner	
1959	Willis H. Warner	
1960	Cecil M. Featherly	
1961	William H. Hirstein	
1962	William J. Phillips	
1963	Cecil M. Featherly	
1964	William J. Phillips	
1965	William H. Hirstein	
1966	Alton Allen	
1967	David L. Baker	
1968	Cecil M. Featherly	
1969	William H. Hirstein	
1970	Alton Allen	
1971	Robert Battin	
1972	Ronald Caspers	
1973	Ronald Caspers	
1974	Ralph B. Clark	
1975	Ralph Diedrich	
1976	Ralph Diedrich	
1977	Thomas F. Riley	
1978	Thomas F. Riley	
1979	Philip Anthony	
1980	Ralph B. Clark	Harriett Wieder
1981	Ralph B. Clark	Bruce Nestande
1982	Bruce Nestande	Roger R. Stanton
1983	Roger R. Stanton	Harriett Wieder
1984	Harriett Wieder	Thomas F. Riley
1985	Thomas F. Riley	Ralph B. Clark
1986	Ralph B. Clark	Bruce Nestande
1987	Roger R. Stanton	Harriett Wieder
1988	Harriett Wieder	Thomas F. Riley
1989	Thomas F. Riley	Don Roth
1990	Don Roth	Gaddi Vasquez
1991	Gaddi Vasquez	Roger R. Stanton
1992	Roger R. Stanton	Harriett Wieder
1993	Harriett Wieder	Thomas F. Riley
1994	Thomas F. Riley	Gaddi Vasquez
1995	Gaddi Vasquez	Roger R. Stanton
1996	Roger R. Stanton	William G. Steiner
1997	William G. Steiner	Jim Silva
1998	Jim Silva	Thomas W. Wilson
1999	Charles V. Smith	Thomas W. Wilson
2000	Charles V. Smith	Jim Silva
2001	Cynthia Coad	Jim Silva
2002	Cynthia Coad	Thomas W. Wilson
2003	Thomas W. Wilson	Jim Silva
2004	Thomas W. Wilson	Jim Silva
2005	Bill Campbell	Thomas W. Wilson
2006	Bill Campbell	Chris Norby
2007	Chris Norby	John Moorlach
2008	John Moorlach	Patricia C. Bates
2009	Patricia C. Bates	Janet Nguyen
2010	Janet Nguyen	Bill Campbell
2011	Bill Campbell	John Moorlach
2012	John Moorlach	Shawn Nelson
2013	Shawn Nelson	Patricia C. Bates
2014	Shawn Nelson	Patricia C. Bates
2015	Todd Spitzer	Lisa Bartlett
2016	Lisa Bartlett	Michelle Steel
2017	Michelle Steel	Andrew Do
2018	Andrew Do	Shawn Nelson
2019	Lisa Bartlett	Michelle Steel
2020	Michelle Steel	Andrew Do
2021	Andrew Do	Doug Chaffee
2022	Doug Chaffee	Donald P. Wagner
2023	Donald P. Wagner	Andrew Do
2024	Donald P. Wagner	Doug Chaffee
2025	Doug Chaffee	Katrina Foley
2026	Doug Chaffee	Katrina Foley

== Supervisors ==
Year	1st District	2nd District	3rd District	4th District	5th District
1889	William H. Spurgeon	Jacob Ross, Jr.	Sheldon Littlefield	Samuel Armor	A. Guy Smith
1890	William H. Spurgeon	Jacob Ross, Jr.	Sheldon Littlefield	Samuel Armor	A. Guy Smith
1891	Joseph Yoch	Joseph W. Hawkins	Louis Schorn	Samuel Armor	William N. Tedford
1892	Joseph Yoch	Joseph W. Hawkins	Louis Schorn	Samuel Armor	William N. Tedford
1893	Joseph Yoch	Joseph W. Hawkins	Louis Schorn	Samuel Armor	William N. Tedford
1894	Joseph Yoch	Joseph W. Hawkins	Louis Schorn	Samuel Armor	William N. Tedford
1895	Franklin P. Nickey	Joseph W. Hawkins	William G. Potter	Samuel Armor	A. Guy Smith
1896	Franklin P. Nickey	Joseph W. Hawkins	William G. Potter	Samuel Armor	A. Guy Smith
1897	Franklin P. Nickey	Joseph W. Hawkins	William G. Potter	Samuel Armor	A. Guy Smith
1898	Franklin P. Nickey	Joseph W. Hawkins	William G. Potter	Samuel Armor	George McCampbell
1899	Franklin P. Nickey	R. Edwin Larter	William G. Potter	DeWitt C. Pixley	John F. Snover
1900	Franklin P. Nickey	R. Edwin Larter	William G. Potter	DeWitt C. Pixley	John F. Snover
1901	Franklin P. Nickey	R. Edwin Larter	William G. Potter	DeWitt C. Pixley	John F. Snover
1902	Franklin P. Nickey	R. Edwin Larter	William G. Potter	DeWitt C. Pixley	John F. Snover
1903	Hudson E. Smith	Jerome Fulsom	Dallison Linebarger	David MacMullan	Upton C. Holderman
1904	Hudson E. Smith	Jerome Fulsom	Dallison Linebarger	David MacMullan	Upton C. Holderman
1905	Hudson E. Smith	Jerome Fulsom	Dallison Linebarger	David MacMullan	Upton C. Holderman
1906	Hudson E. Smith	Jerome Fulsom	Dallison Linebarger	David MacMullan	Upton C. Holderman
1907	Hudson E. Smith	George W. Moore	Dallison Linebarger	David MacMullan	George W. Angle
1908	Hudson E. Smith	George W. Moore	Dallison Linebarger	David MacMullan	George W. Angle
1909	Hudson E. Smith	George W. Moore	Dallison Linebarger	David MacMullan	George W. Angle
1910	Hudson E. Smith	Thomas B. Talbert	Dallison Linebarger	Fredrick W. Struck	George W. Angle
1911	Hudson E. Smith	Thomas B. Talbert	Dallison Linebarger	Fredrick W. Struck	Jasper Leck
1912	Hudson E. Smith	Thomas B. Talbert	Dallison Linebarger	Fredrick W. Struck	Jasper Leck
1913	Hudson E. Smith	Thomas B. Talbert	William Schumacher	Fredrick W. Struck	Jasper Leck
1914	Hudson E. Smith	Thomas B. Talbert	William Schumacher	Fredrick W. Struck	Jasper Leck
1915	Hudson E. Smith	Thomas B. Talbert	William Schumacher	Fredrick W. Struck	Jasper Leck
1916	Hudson E. Smith	Thomas B. Talbert	William Schumacher	Fredrick W. Struck	Jasper Leck
1917	S. Henderson Finley	Thomas B. Talbert	William Schumacher	Fredrick W. Struck	Jasper Leck
1918	S. Henderson Finley	Thomas B. Talbert	William Schumacher	Fredrick W. Struck	Jasper Leck
1919	S. Henderson Finley	Thomas B. Talbert	William Schumacher	Nelson T. Edwards	Howard A. Wassum
1920	S. Henderson Finley	Thomas B. Talbert	William Schumacher	Nelson T. Edwards	Howard A. Wassum
1921	S. Henderson Finley	Thomas B. Talbert	William Schumacher	Nelson T. Edwards	Howard A. Wassum
1922	S. Henderson Finley	Thomas B. Talbert	William Schumacher	Nelson T. Edwards	Howard A. Wassum
1923	S. Henderson Finley	Thomas B. Talbert	William Schumacher	Leon O. Whitsell	George Jeffrey
1924	S. Henderson Finley	Thomas B. Talbert	William Schumacher	Leon O. Whitsell	George Jeffrey
1925	S. Henderson Finley	Thomas B. Talbert	William Schumacher	Leon O. Whitsell	George Jeffrey
1926	S. Henderson Finley	Thomas B. Talbert	William Schumacher	Willard Smith	George Jeffrey
1927	S. Henderson Finley	John C. Mitchell	William Schumacher	Willard Smith	George Jeffrey
1928	S. Henderson Finley	John C. Mitchell	William Schumacher	Willard Smith	George Jeffrey
1929	Charles H. Chapman	John C. Mitchell	William Schumacher	Willard Smith	George Jeffrey
1930	Charles H. Chapman	John C. Mitchell	William Schumacher	Willard Smith	George Jeffrey
1931	Charles H. Chapman	John C. Mitchell	William Schumacher	Willard Smith	George Jeffrey
1932	Charles H. Chapman	John C. Mitchell	William Schumacher	Willard Smith	George Jeffrey
1933	William C. Jerome	John C. Mitchell	Leroy E. Lyon	Willard Smith	George Jeffrey
1934	William C. Jerome	John C. Mitchell	Leroy E. Lyon	Willard Smith	George Jeffrey
1935	William C. Jerome	John C. Mitchell	Leroy E. Lyon	Willard Smith	N. Elliot West
1936	William C. Jerome	John C. Mitchell	Leroy E. Lyon	Willard Smith	N. Elliot West
1937	Steele Finley	John C. Mitchell	Harry D. Riley	Willard Smith	N. Elliot West
1938	Steele Finley	John C. Mitchell	Harry D. Riley	Willard Smith	N. Elliot West
1939	Steele Finley	Willis H. Warner	Harry D. Riley	Willard Smith	N. Elliot West
1940	Steele Finley	Willis H. Warner	Harry D. Riley	Willard Smith	N. Elliot West
1941	Fred C. Rowland	Willis H. Warner	James A. Baker	Willard Smith	N. Elliot West
1942	Fred C. Rowland	Willis H. Warner	James A. Baker	Willard Smith	N. Elliot West
1943	Fred C. Rowland	Willis H. Warner	James A. Baker	Willard Smith	Irvin George Gordon
1944	Fred C. Rowland	Willis H. Warner	James A. Baker	Willard Smith	Irvin George Gordon
1945	Fred C. Rowland	Willis H. Warner	James A. Baker	Willard Smith	Irvin George Gordon
1946	Fred C. Rowland	Willis H. Warner	James A. Baker	Willard Smith	Irvin George Gordon
1947	Fred C. Rowland	Willis H. Warner	James A. Baker	Willard Smith	Irvin George Gordon
1948	Fred C. Rowland	Willis H. Warner	James A. Baker	Willard Smith	Irvin George Gordon
1949	Cecil M. Featherly	Willis H. Warner	Ralph J. McFadden	Willard Smith	Irvin George Gordon
1950	Cecil M. Featherly	Willis H. Warner	Ralph J. McFadden	Willard Smith	Irvin George Gordon
1951	Cecil M. Featherly	Willis H. Warner	Ralph J. McFadden	Willard Smith	Heinz Kaiser
1952	Cecil M. Featherly	Willis H. Warner	Ralph J. McFadden	Willard Smith	Heinz Kaiser
1953	Cecil M. Featherly	Willis H. Warner	Ralph J. McFadden	Willard Smith	Heinz Kaiser
1954	Cecil M. Featherly	Willis H. Warner	Ralph J. McFadden	Willard Smith	Heinz Kaiser
1955	Cecil M. Featherly	Willis H. Warner	Ralph J. McFadden	William H. Hirstein	Heinz Kaiser
1956	Cecil M. Featherly	Willis H. Warner	Ralph J. McFadden	William H. Hirstein	Heinz Kaiser
1957	Cecil M. Featherly	Willis H. Warner	William J. Phillips	William H. Hirstein	Heinz Kaiser
1958	Cecil M. Featherly	Willis H. Warner	William J. Phillips	William H. Hirstein	Benjamin O. Reddick
1959	Cecil M. Featherly	Willis H. Warner	William J. Phillips	William H. Hirstein	Claire M. Nelson
1960	Cecil M. Featherly	Willis H. Warner	William J. Phillips	William H. Hirstein	Claire M. Nelson
1961	Cecil M. Featherly	Willis H. Warner	William J. Phillips	William H. Hirstein	Claire M. Nelson
1962	Cecil M. Featherly	Willis H. Warner	William J. Phillips	William H. Hirstein	Claire M. Nelson
1963	Cecil M. Featherly	David L. Baker	William J. Phillips	William H. Hirstein	Alton Allen
1964	Cecil M. Featherly	David L. Baker	William J. Phillips	William H. Hirstein	Alton Allen
1965	Cecil M. Featherly	David L. Baker	William J. Phillips	William H. Hirstein	Alton Allen
1966	Cecil M. Featherly	David L. Baker	William J. Phillips	William H. Hirstein	Alton Allen
1967	Cecil M. Featherly	David L. Baker	William J. Phillips	William H. Hirstein	Alton Allen
1968	Cecil M. Featherly	David L. Baker	William J. Phillips	William H. Hirstein	Alton Allen
1969	Robert Battin	David L. Baker	William J. Phillips	William H. Hirstein	Alton Allen
1970	Robert Battin	David L. Baker	William J. Phillips	William H. Hirstein	Alton Allen
1971	Robert Battin	David L. Baker	William J. Phillips	Ralph B. Clark	Ronald Caspers
1972	Robert Battin	David L. Baker	William J. Phillips	Ralph B. Clark	Ronald Caspers
1973	Robert Battin	David L. Baker	Ralph Diedrich	Ralph B. Clark	Ronald Caspers
1974	Robert Battin	David L. Baker	Ralph Diedrich	Ralph B. Clark	Ronald Caspers
1975	Robert Battin	Laurence Schmit	Ralph Diedrich	Ralph B. Clark	Thomas F. Riley
1976	Robert Battin	Laurence Schmit	Ralph Diedrich	Ralph B. Clark	Thomas F. Riley
1977	Philip Anthony	Laurence Schmit	Ralph Diedrich	Ralph B. Clark	Thomas F. Riley
1978	Philip Anthony	Laurence Schmit	Ralph Diedrich	Ralph B. Clark	Thomas F. Riley
1979	Philip Anthony	Harriett Wieder	Ralph Diedrich	Ralph B. Clark	Thomas F. Riley
1980	Philip Anthony	Harriett Wieder	Edison Miller	Ralph B. Clark	Thomas F. Riley
1981	Roger R. Stanton	Harriett Wieder	Bruce Nestande	Ralph B. Clark	Thomas F. Riley
1982	Roger R. Stanton	Harriett Wieder	Bruce Nestande	Ralph B. Clark	Thomas F. Riley
1983	Roger R. Stanton	Harriett Wieder	Bruce Nestande	Ralph B. Clark	Thomas F. Riley
1984	Roger R. Stanton	Harriett Wieder	Bruce Nestande	Ralph B. Clark	Thomas F. Riley
1985	Roger R. Stanton	Harriett Wieder	Bruce Nestande	Ralph B. Clark	Thomas F. Riley
1986	Roger R. Stanton	Harriett Wieder	Bruce Nestande	Ralph B. Clark	Thomas F. Riley
1987	Roger R. Stanton	Harriett Wieder	Gaddi Vasquez	Don Roth	Thomas F. Riley
1988	Roger R. Stanton	Harriett Wieder	Gaddi Vasquez	Don Roth	Thomas F. Riley
1989	Roger R. Stanton	Harriett Wieder	Gaddi Vasquez	Don Roth	Thomas F. Riley
1990	Roger R. Stanton	Harriett Wieder	Gaddi Vasquez	Don Roth	Thomas F. Riley
1991	Roger R. Stanton	Harriett Wieder	Gaddi Vasquez	Don Roth	Thomas F. Riley
1992	Roger R. Stanton	Harriett Wieder	Gaddi Vasquez	Don Roth	Thomas F. Riley
1993	Roger R. Stanton	Harriett Wieder	Gaddi Vasquez	William G. Steiner	Thomas F. Riley
1994	Roger R. Stanton	Harriett Wieder	Gaddi Vasquez	William G. Steiner	Thomas F. Riley
1995	Roger R. Stanton	Jim Silva	Gaddi Vasquez	William G. Steiner	Marian Bergeson
1996	Roger R. Stanton	Jim Silva	Donald Saltarelli	William G. Steiner	Marian Bergeson
1997	Charles V. Smith	Jim Silva	Todd Spitzer	William G. Steiner	Thomas W. Wilson
1998	Charles V. Smith	Jim Silva	Todd Spitzer	William G. Steiner	Thomas W. Wilson
1999	Charles V. Smith	Jim Silva	Todd Spitzer	Cynthia Coad	Thomas W. Wilson
2000	Charles V. Smith	Jim Silva	Todd Spitzer	Cynthia Coad	Thomas W. Wilson
2001	Charles V. Smith	Jim Silva	Todd Spitzer	Cynthia Coad	Thomas W. Wilson
2002	Charles V. Smith	Jim Silva	Todd Spitzer	Cynthia Coad	Thomas W. Wilson
2003	Charles V. Smith	Jim Silva	Bill Campbell	Chris Norby	Thomas W. Wilson
2004	Charles V. Smith	Jim Silva	Bill Campbell	Chris Norby	Thomas W. Wilson
2005	Lou Correa	Jim Silva	Bill Campbell	Chris Norby	Thomas W. Wilson
2006	Lou Correa	Jim Silva	Bill Campbell	Chris Norby	Thomas W. Wilson
2007	Janet Nguyen	John Moorlach	Bill Campbell	Chris Norby	Patricia C. Bates
2008	Janet Nguyen	John Moorlach	Bill Campbell	Chris Norby	Patricia C. Bates
2009	Janet Nguyen	John Moorlach	Bill Campbell	Chris Norby	Patricia C. Bates
2010	Janet Nguyen	John Moorlach	Bill Campbell	Shawn Nelson	Patricia C. Bates
2011	Janet Nguyen	John Moorlach	Bill Campbell	Shawn Nelson	Patricia C. Bates
2012	Janet Nguyen	John Moorlach	Bill Campbell	Shawn Nelson	Patricia C. Bates
2013	Janet Nguyen	John Moorlach	Todd Spitzer	Shawn Nelson	Patricia C. Bates
2014	Janet Nguyen	John Moorlach	Todd Spitzer	Shawn Nelson	Patricia C. Bates
2015	Andrew Do	Michelle Steel	Todd Spitzer	Shawn Nelson	Lisa Bartlett
2016	Andrew Do	Michelle Steel	Todd Spitzer	Shawn Nelson	Lisa Bartlett
2017	Andrew Do	Michelle Steel	Todd Spitzer	Shawn Nelson	Lisa Bartlett
2018	Andrew Do	Michelle Steel	Todd Spitzer	Shawn Nelson	Lisa Bartlett
2019	Andrew Do	Michelle Steel	Donald P. Wagner	Doug Chaffee	Lisa Bartlett
2020	Andrew Do	Michelle Steel	Donald P. Wagner	Doug Chaffee	Lisa Bartlett
2021	Andrew Do	Katrina Foley	Donald P. Wagner	Doug Chaffee	Lisa Bartlett
2022	Andrew Do	Katrina Foley	Donald P. Wagner	Doug Chaffee	Lisa Bartlett
2023	Andrew Do	Vicente Sarmiento	Donald P. Wagner	Doug Chaffee	Katrina Foley
2024	Andrew Do	Vicente Sarmiento	Donald P. Wagner	Doug Chaffee	Katrina Foley
2025	Janet Nguyen	Vicente Sarmiento	Donald P. Wagner	Doug Chaffee	Katrina Foley
2026	Janet Nguyen	Vicente Sarmiento	Donald P. Wagner	Doug Chaffee	Katrina Foley
