= Doug Chaffee (politician) =

American politician

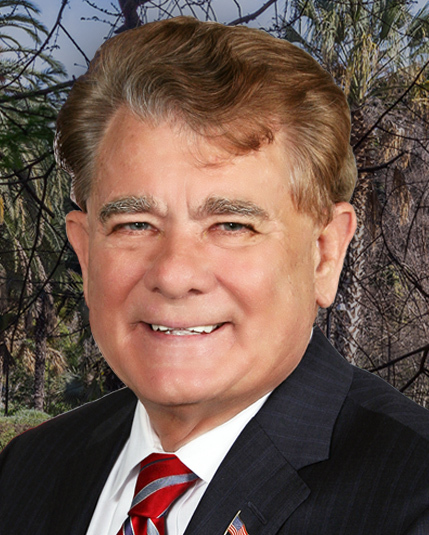

Chair of the Orange County Board of Supervisors
- Incumbent
- Assumed office January 14, 2025
- Preceded by: Donald P. Wagner
- In office January 11, 2022 – January 10, 2023
- Preceded by: Andrew Do
- Succeeded by: Donald P. Wagner

Vice Chair of the Orange County Board of Supervisors
- In office January 9, 2024 – January 14, 2025
- Preceded by: Andrew Do
- Succeeded by: Katrina Foley
- In office January 12, 2021 – January 11, 2022
- Preceded by: Andrew Do
- Succeeded by: Donald P. Wagner

Member of the Orange County Board of Supervisors from the 4th district
- Incumbent
- Assumed office January 7, 2019
- Preceded by: Shawn Nelson

Mayor of Fullerton
- In office December 5, 2017 – December 4, 2018
- Preceded by: Bruce Whitaker
- Succeeded by: Jesus Silva

Mayor Pro Tem of Fullerton
- In office December 16, 2016 – December 5, 2017
- Preceded by: Jan Flory
- Succeeded by: Greg Sebourn

Member of the Fullerton City Council for the At-large District
- In office July 4, 2012 – December 18, 2018
- Preceded by: F. Richard Jones
- Succeeded by: Office Abolished

Personal details
- Born: November 9, 1943 (age 83) California, U.S.
- Party: Democratic
- Spouse: Paulette (m. 1977)
- Children: 2
- Education: University of Redlands (BA); Northwestern University (JD)
- Website: https://d4.ocgov.com/

Douglas B. Chaffee (born November 9, 1943) is an American politician and retired attorney serving as a member & Chair of the Orange County Board of Supervisors from the 4th district. Elected in November 2018, he assumed office on January 7, 2019. He previously served as a Fullerton City Councilmember. In December of 2017 he was selected to serve as Mayor Pro Tem of Fullerton and the following year he was selected as Mayor of Fullerton.

== Early life and education ==
Chaffee was raised in Anaheim, California before moving to Fullerton, California, where he graduated from Fullerton Union High School in 1961. He earned a Bachelor of Arts degree in economics from the University of Redlands in 1965 and a Juris Doctor from the Northwestern University School of Law in 1968.

== Career ==
Prior to entering politics, Chaffee worked as an attorney. Chaffee was elected to the Fullerton, California City Council in 2012 and served until 2018. He was selected to serve as mayor in 2018. In November 2018, Chaffee was narrowly elected to the Orange County Board of Supervisors, defeating La Habra City Councilman Tim Shaw to become the first Democratic member elected in 12 years. He assumed office on January 1, 2019. From January 2022 to January 2023, Chaffee served as chair of the Orange County Board of Supervisors.

In May 2020, Chaffee was a guest on KPCC, where he discussed Orange County beach closures amid the COVID-19 pandemic.

In addition to the Orange County Board of Supervisors, he serves on the board of the Orange County Transportation Authority.

== Personal life ==
Chaffee and his wife, Paulette, have been married since 1977. They have two sons.
