= 2010 California State Assembly election =

- November 2, 2010

All 80 seats in the California State Assembly 41 seats needed for a majority
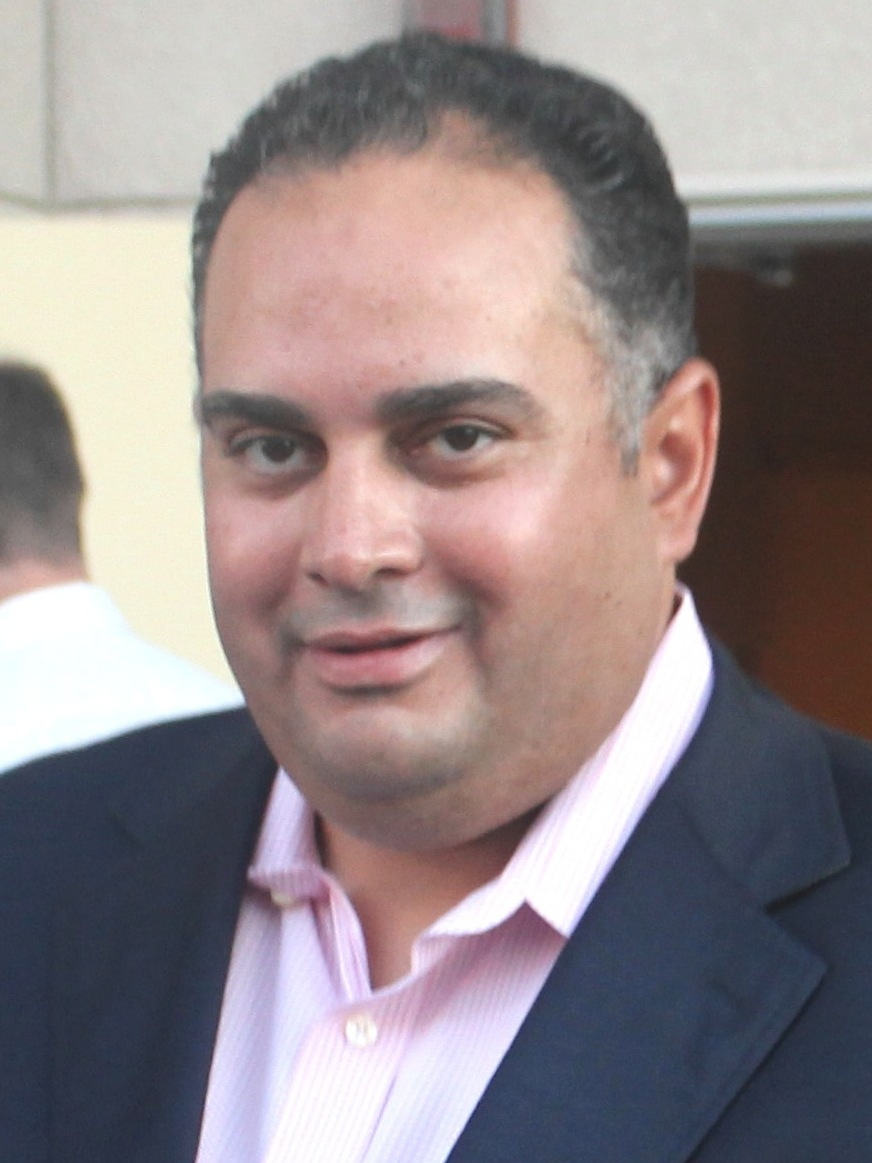

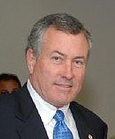
	Majority party	Minority party
Leader	John Pérez	Martin Garrick (retired)
Party	Democratic	Republican
Leader since	March 1, 2010	February 1, 2010
Leader's seat	46th–Los Angeles	74th–Carlsbad
Last election	51 seats, 57.80%	29 seats, 40.43%
Seats before	50	29
Seats won	52	28
Seat change	▲2	▼1
Popular vote	5,121,423	4,121,280
Percentage	54.27%	43.67%
Swing	▼3.53%	▲3.24%
- Democratic gain Democratic hold Republican hold 50–60% 60–70% 70–80% 80–90% >90% 50–60% 60–70% 70–80% >90%
Speaker before election
John Pérez
Democratic
Elected Speaker
John Pérez
Democratic

The 2010 California State Assembly elections were held on November 2, 2010. Voters in California's 80 State Assembly districts voted for their representative. The Democratic Party gained two seats: the 5th district from the Republicans and the 31st district from a termed-out Independent, expanding their majority to 52.

== Overview ==
California State Assembly elections, 2010
Party	Votes	Percentage	Seats	+/–
Democratic	5,121,423	54.27%	52	▲2
Republican	4,121,280	43.67%	28	▼1
Libertarian	115,714	1.23%	0	0
Green	46,599	0.49%	0	0
Peace and Freedom	26,806	0.28%	0	0
American Independent	4,269	0.05%	0	0
Independent	163	0.00%	0	▼1
Totals	9,436,254	100.00%	80	—
Voter turnout	54.59%			

↓
52	28
Democratic	Republican

== Predictions ==
Source	Ranking	As of
Governing	Safe D	November 1, 2010

== Results ==
Below are the final official results as reported by the Secretary of State.

=== District 1 ===
California's 1st State Assembly district election, 2010
Party	Candidate	Votes	%
Democratic	Wesley Chesbro (incumbent)	98,250	61.6
Republican	Karen Brooks	61,414	38.4
Total votes		159,664	100.0
Democratic hold			

=== District 2 ===
California's 2nd State Assembly district election, 2010
Party	Candidate	Votes	%
Republican	Jim Nielsen (incumbent)	118,120	100.0
Total votes		118,120	100.0
Republican hold			

=== District 3 ===
California's 3rd State Assembly district election, 2010
Party	Candidate	Votes	%
Republican	Dan Logue (incumbent)	84,069	54.2
Democratic	Michael Harrington	56,812	36.6
Libertarian	Gary Bryant	14,420	9.2
Total votes		155,301	100.0
Republican hold			

=== District 4 ===
California's 4th State Assembly district election, 2010
Party	Candidate	Votes	%
Republican	Ted Gaines (incumbent)	109,672	58.8
Democratic	Dennis J. Campanale	68,306	36.6
Peace and Freedom	Daniel D. Frederick	8,647	4.6
Total votes		186,625	100.0
Republican hold			

=== District 5 ===
California's 5th State Assembly district election, 2010
Party	Candidate	Votes	%
Democratic	Richard Pan	78,239	49.6
Republican	Andy Pugno	71,910	45.5
Peace and Freedom	Elizabeth Martinez	7,850	4.9
Total votes		157,999	100.0
Democratic gain from Republican			

=== District 6 ===
California's 6th State Assembly district election, 2010
Party	Candidate	Votes	%
Democratic	Jared Huffman (incumbent)	119,753	70.5
Republican	Robert Louis Stephens	50,218	29.5
Total votes		169,971	100.0
Democratic hold			

=== District 7 ===
California's 7th State Assembly district election, 2010
Party	Candidate	Votes	%
Democratic	Michael Allen	86,316	63.7
Republican	Doris Gentry	43,293	31.9
Libertarian	Kathryn N. Moore	5,977	4.4
Total votes		135,586	100.0
Democratic hold			

=== District 8 ===
California's 8th State Assembly district election, 2010
Party	Candidate	Votes	%
Democratic	Mariko Yamada (incumbent)	79,846	61.6
Republican	Michelle P. Connor	49,797	38.4
Total votes		129,643	100.0
Democratic hold			

=== District 9 ===
California's 9th State Assembly district election, 2010
Party	Candidate	Votes	%
Democratic	Roger Dickinson	67,294	68.0
Republican	Rick D. Redding	24,766	25.0
Peace and Freedom	Daniel A. Costa	6,941	7.0
Total votes		99,001	100.0
Democratic hold			

=== District 10 ===
California's 10th State Assembly district election, 2010
Party	Candidate	Votes	%
Democratic	Alyson Huber (incumbent)	83,177	52.0
Republican	Jack Sieglock	68,395	42.7
Libertarian	Janice Marlae Bonser	5,286	3.2
Peace and Freedom	Albert R. Troyer	3,368	2.1
Total votes		160,226	100.0
Democratic hold			

=== District 11 ===
California's 11th State Assembly district election, 2010
Party	Candidate	Votes	%
Democratic	Susan Bonilla	81,869	69.0
Republican	Julie Craven	36,864	31.0
Total votes		118,733	100.0
Democratic hold			

=== District 12 ===
California's 12th State Assembly district election, 2010
Party	Candidate	Votes	%
Democratic	Fiona Ma (incumbent)	90,388	80.8
Republican	Alfonso Faustino	21,540	19.2
Total votes		111,928	100.0
Democratic hold			

=== District 13 ===
California's 13th State Assembly district election, 2010
Party	Candidate	Votes	%
Democratic	Tom Ammiano (incumbent)	120,174	83.0
Republican	Laura Peter	24,741	17.0
Total votes		144,915	100.0
Democratic hold			

=== District 14 ===
California's 14th State Assembly district election, 2010
Party	Candidate	Votes	%
Democratic	Nancy Skinner (incumbent)	127,940	82.1
Republican	Ryan Hatcher	28,055	17.9
Total votes		155,995	100.0
Democratic hold			

=== District 15 ===
California's 15th State Assembly district election, 2010
Party	Candidate	Votes	%
Democratic	Joan Buchanan (incumbent)	104,441	53.4
Republican	H. Abram Wilson	91,378	46.6
Total votes		195,819	100.0
Democratic hold			

=== District 16 ===
California's 16th State Assembly district election, 2010
Party	Candidate	Votes	%
Democratic	Sandré Swanson (incumbent)	99,082	83.5
Republican	James I. "Jim" Faison	14,692	12.4
Libertarian	Lisa D. Ringer	4,909	4.1
Total votes		118,683	100.0
Democratic hold			

=== District 17 ===
California's 17th State Assembly district election, 2010
Party	Candidate	Votes	%
Democratic	Cathleen Galgiani (incumbent)	52,219	58.4
Republican	Jack Mobley	37,293	41.6
Total votes		89,512	100.0
Democratic hold			

=== District 18 ===
California's 18th State Assembly district election, 2010
Party	Candidate	Votes	%
Democratic	Mary Hayashi (incumbent)	85,237	75.2
Republican	Michael Havig	28,124	24.8
Total votes		113,361	100.0
Democratic hold			

=== District 19 ===
California's 19th State Assembly district election, 2010
Party	Candidate	Votes	%
Democratic	Jerry Hill (incumbent)	90,717	70.8
Republican	Alberto Waisman	33,765	26.4
Libertarian	Gary Tutin	3,674	2.8
Total votes		128,156	100.0
Democratic hold			

=== District 20 ===
California's 20th State Assembly district election, 2010
Party	Candidate	Votes	%
Democratic	Bob Wieckowski	76,446	72.9
Republican	Adnan Shahab	28,460	27.1
Total votes		104,906	100.0
Democratic hold			

=== District 21 ===
California's 21st State Assembly district election, 2010
Party	Candidate	Votes	%
Democratic	Rich Gordon	89,927	60.1
Republican	Greg Conlon	52,809	35.3
Libertarian	Ray M. Bell, Jr.	6,925	4.6
Total votes		149,661	100.0
Democratic hold			

=== District 22 ===
California's 22nd State Assembly district election, 2010
Party	Candidate	Votes	%
Democratic	Paul Fong (incumbent)	74,501	67.1
Republican	Eric Shooter Hickok	30,143	27.1
Libertarian	T.J. Campbell	6,478	5.8
Total votes		111,122	100.0
Democratic hold			

=== District 23 ===
California's 23rd State Assembly district election, 2010
Party	Candidate	Votes	%
Democratic	Nora Campos	58,629	75.1
Republican	Atul Saini	19,494	24.9
Total votes		78,123	100.0
Democratic hold			

=== District 24 ===
California's 24th State Assembly district election, 2010
Party	Candidate	Votes	%
Democratic	Jim Beall (incumbent)	81,526	62.0
Republican	Robert Chandler	50,087	38.0
Total votes		131,613	100.0
Democratic hold			

=== District 25 ===
California's 25th State Assembly district election, 2010
Party	Candidate	Votes	%
Republican	Kristin Olsen	106,715	100.0
Total votes		106,715	100.0
Republican hold			

=== District 26 ===
California's 26th State Assembly district election, 2010
Party	Candidate	Votes	%
Republican	Bill Berryhill (incumbent)	64,625	60.8
Democratic	Tim Weintz, Sr.	41,775	39.2
Total votes		106,400	100.0
Republican hold			

=== District 27 ===
California's 27th State Assembly district election, 2010
Party	Candidate	Votes	%
Democratic	Bill Monning (incumbent)	102,124	66.8
Republican	Linda "Ellie" Black	50,831	33.2
Total votes		152,955	100.0
Democratic hold			

=== District 28 ===
California's 28th State Assembly district election, 2010
Party	Candidate	Votes	%
Democratic	Luis Alejo	56,098	62.8
Republican	Robert Bernosky	33,264	37.2
Total votes		89,359	100.0
Democratic hold			

=== District 29 ===
California's 29th State Assembly district election, 2010
Party	Candidate	Votes	%
Republican	Linda Halderman	89,016	67.4
Democratic	Michael J. Esswein	43,124	32.6
Total votes		132,140	100.0
Republican hold			

=== District 30 ===
California's 30th State Assembly district election, 2010
Party	Candidate	Votes	%
Republican	David Valadao	37,392	60.6
Democratic	Fran Florez	24,386	39.4
Total votes		61,778	100.0
Republican hold			

=== District 31 ===
California's 31st State Assembly district election, 2010
Party	Candidate	Votes	%
Democratic	Henry Perea	40,947	59.8
Republican	Brandon Shoemaker	27,606	40.2
Total votes		68,553	100.0
Democratic gain from Independent			

=== District 32 ===
California's 32nd State Assembly district election, 2010
Party	Candidate	Votes	%
Republican	Shannon Grove	97,470	72.1
Democratic	Holly Spohn-Gross	37,892	27.9
Total votes		135,362	100.0
Republican hold			

=== District 33 ===
California's 33rd State Assembly district election, 2010
Party	Candidate	Votes	%
Republican	Katcho Achadjian	84,629	57.8
Democratic	Hilda Zacarias	54,817	37.4
Libertarian	Paul K. Polson	7,051	4.8
Total votes		146,497	100.0
Republican hold			

=== District 34 ===
California's 34th State Assembly district election, 2010
Party	Candidate	Votes	%
Republican	Connie Conway (incumbent)	67,303	70.2
Democratic	Esmeralda Castro	28,657	29.8
Total votes		95,960	100.0
Republican hold			

=== District 35 ===
California's 35th State Assembly district election, 2010
Party	Candidate	Votes	%
Democratic	Das Williams	75,821	54.9
Republican	Mike Stoker	62,310	45.1
Total votes		138,131	100.0
Democratic hold			

=== District 36 ===
California's 36th State Assembly district election, 2010
Party	Candidate	Votes	%
Republican	Steve Knight (incumbent)	66,312	57.6
Democratic	Linda K. Jones	48,943	42.4
Total votes		115,255	100.0
Republican hold			

=== District 37 ===
California's 37th State Assembly district election, 2010
Party	Candidate	Votes	%
Republican	Jeff Gorell	90,649	58.5
Democratic	Ferial Masry	64,413	41.5
Total votes		155,062	100.0
Republican hold			

=== District 38 ===
California's 38th State Assembly district election, 2010
Party	Candidate	Votes	%
Republican	Cameron Smyth (incumbent)	83,854	56.7
Democratic	Diana G. Shaw	55,062	37.3
Libertarian	Peggy Christensen	9,015	6.0
Total votes		147,931	100.0
Republican hold			

=== District 39 ===
California's 39th State Assembly district election, 2010
Party	Candidate	Votes	%
Democratic	Felipe Fuentes (incumbent)	43,267	78.5
Green	John Paul (Jack) Lindblad	11,905	21.6
Total votes		55,172	100.0
Democratic hold			

=== District 40 ===
California's 40th State Assembly district election, 2010
Party	Candidate	Votes	%
Democratic	Bob Blumenfield (incumbent)	56,208	61.0
Republican	Dennis Deyoung	36,069	39.0
Total votes		92,277	100.0
Democratic hold			

=== District 41 ===
California's 41st State Assembly district election, 2010
Party	Candidate	Votes	%
Democratic	Julia Brownley (incumbent)	84,222	58.8
Republican	Terry Rathbun	53,243	37.2
Green	Linda Piera-Ávila	5,837	4.0
Total votes		143,302	100.0
Democratic hold			

=== District 42 ===
California's 42nd State Assembly district election, 2010
Party	Candidate	Votes	%
Democratic	Mike Feuer (incumbent)	106,029	73.2
Republican	Mary Toman-Miller	38,836	26.8
Republican	David Hernandez (write-in)	17	0.0
Total votes		144,882	100.0
Democratic hold			

=== District 43 ===
California's 43rd State Assembly district election, 2010
Party	Candidate	Votes	%
Democratic	Mike Gatto (incumbent)	65,350	66.0
Republican	Sunder Ramani	33,767	34.0
Total votes		99,117	100.0
Democratic hold			

=== District 44 ===
California's 44th State Assembly district election, 2010
Party	Candidate	Votes	%
Democratic	Anthony Portantino (incumbent)	81,347	63.8
Republican	Alvaro G. Day	41,571	32.6
Libertarian	Eytan Kollin	4,613	3.6
Total votes		127,531	100.0
Democratic hold			

=== District 45 ===
California's 45th State Assembly district election, 2010
Party	Candidate	Votes	%
Democratic	Gil Cedillo	53,745	83.4
Republican	Suzanne Ovilos	10,724	16.6
Total votes		64,469	100.0
Democratic hold			

=== District 46 ===
California's 46th State Assembly district election, 2010
Party	Candidate	Votes	%
Democratic	John Pérez (incumbent)	38,566	100.0
Total votes		38,566	100.0
Democratic hold			

=== District 47 ===
California's 47th State Assembly district election, 2010
Party	Candidate	Votes	%
Democratic	Holly Mitchell	93,541	80.7
Republican	Lady Cage	17,195	14.8
Libertarian	Sean P. McGary	5,305	4.5
Total votes		116,041	100.0
Democratic hold			

=== District 48 ===
California's 48th State Assembly district election, 2010
Party	Candidate	Votes	%
Democratic	Mike Davis (incumbent)	50,825	100.0
Total votes		50,825	100.0
Democratic hold			

=== District 49 ===
California's 49th State Assembly district election, 2010
Party	Candidate	Votes	%
Democratic	Mike Eng (incumbent)	46,841	68.9
Republican	Brad Jonathan Taylor	21,148	31.1
Total votes		67,989	100.0
Democratic hold			

=== District 50 ===
California's 50th State Assembly district election, 2010
Party	Candidate	Votes	%
Democratic	Ricardo Lara	46,676	77.7
Republican	Gladys O. Miller	13,452	22.3
Total votes		60,128	100.0
Democratic hold			

=== District 51 ===
California's 51st State Assembly district election, 2010
Party	Candidate	Votes	%
Democratic	Steven Bradford (incumbent)	69,111	81.7
Green	Cynthia Santiago	15,486	18.3
Total votes		84,597	100.0
Democratic hold			

=== District 52 ===
California's 52nd State Assembly district election, 2010
Party	Candidate	Votes	%
Democratic	Isadore Hall, III (incumbent)	48,323	88.3
Republican	Gwen Patrick	6,399	11.7
Total votes		54,722	100.0
Democratic hold			

=== District 53 ===
California's 53rd State Assembly district election, 2010
Party	Candidate	Votes	%
Democratic	Betsy Butler	73,344	50.3
Republican	Nathan Mintz	62,770	43.0
Green	Lisa Ann Green	6,526	4.4
Libertarian	Ethan Musulin	3,446	2.3
Total votes		146,086	100.0
Democratic hold			

=== District 54 ===
California's 54th State Assembly district election, 2010
Party	Candidate	Votes	%
Democratic	Bonnie Lowenthal (incumbent)	73,775	56.7
Republican	Martha E. Flores-Gibson	56,535	43.3
Total votes		130,310	100.0
Democratic hold			

=== District 55 ===
California's 55th State Assembly district election, 2010
Party	Candidate	Votes	%
Democratic	Warren Furutani (incumbent)	61,088	70.7
Republican	Christopher Salabaj	25,328	29.3
Total votes		86,416	100.0
Democratic hold			

=== District 56 ===
California's 56th State Assembly district election, 2010
Party	Candidate	Votes	%
Democratic	Tony Mendoza (incumbent)	56,943	65.5
Republican	Henry J. Bestwick	30,111	34.5
Total votes		87,054	100.0
Democratic hold			

=== District 57 ===
California's 57th State Assembly district election, 2010
Party	Candidate	Votes	%
Democratic	Roger Hernandez	52,763	67.2
Republican	Brian A. Gutierrez	25,699	32.6
Independent	Mike Meza (write-in)	163	0.2
Total votes		78,625	100.0
Democratic hold			

=== District 58 ===
California's 58th State Assembly district election, 2010
Party	Candidate	Votes	%
Democratic	Charles Calderon (incumbent)	61,375	68.9
Republican	Garrett M. May	27,771	31.1
Total votes		89,146	100.0
Democratic hold			

=== District 59 ===
California's 59th State Assembly district election, 2010
Party	Candidate	Votes	%
Republican	Tim Donnelly	82,475	57.3
Democratic	Darcel Woods	52,928	36.8
Libertarian	Tony Tyler	4,335	3.0
American Independent	Robert Gosney	4,269	2.9
Total votes		144,007	100.0
Republican hold			

=== District 60 ===
California's 60th State Assembly district election, 2010
Party	Candidate	Votes	%
Republican	Curt Hagman (incumbent)	83,354	65.3
Democratic	Gregg D. Fritchle	44,405	34.7
Total votes		127,759	100.0
Republican hold			

=== District 61 ===
California's 61st State Assembly district election, 2010
Party	Candidate	Votes	%
Democratic	Norma Torres (incumbent)	43,813	60.2
Republican	Ray Moors	29,009	39.8
Total votes		72,822	100.0
Democratic hold			

=== District 62 ===
California's 62nd State Assembly district election, 2010
Party	Candidate	Votes	%
Democratic	Wilmer Carter (incumbent)	44,606	69.8
Republican	Jeane Ensley	19,319	30.2
Total votes		63,925	100.0
Democratic hold			

=== District 63 ===
California's 63rd State Assembly district election, 2010
Party	Candidate	Votes	%
Republican	Mike Morrell	72,866	58.1
Democratic	Renea Wickman	52,653	41.9
Total votes		125,519	100.0
Republican hold			

=== District 64 ===
California's 64th State Assembly district election, 2010
Party	Candidate	Votes	%
Republican	Brian Nestande (incumbent)	75,737	57.3
Democratic	Jose Medina	56,574	42.7
Total votes		132,311	100.0
Republican hold			

=== District 65 ===
California's 65th State Assembly district election, 2010
Party	Candidate	Votes	%
Republican	Paul Cook (incumbent)	78,475	57.9
Democratic	Carl Wood	57,212	42.1
Total votes		135,687	100.0
Republican hold			

=== District 66 ===
California's 66th State Assembly district election, 2010
Party	Candidate	Votes	%
Republican	Kevin Jeffries (incumbent)	81,176	64.8
Democratic	Douglas P. Dye	44,134	35.2
Total votes		125,310	100.0
Republican hold			

=== District 67 ===
California's 67th State Assembly district election, 2010
Party	Candidate	Votes	%
Republican	Jim Silva (incumbent)	91,108	66.3
Democratic	Rosalind Freeman	46,435	33.7
Total votes		137,543	100.0
Republican hold			

=== District 68 ===
California's 68th State Assembly district election, 2010
Party	Candidate	Votes	%
Republican	Allan Mansoor	57,016	54.9
Democratic	Phu Nguyen	46,269	44.6
Republican	Long Pham (write-in)	617	0.5
Total votes		103,902	100.0
Republican hold			

=== District 69 ===
California's 69th State Assembly district election, 2010
Party	Candidate	Votes	%
Democratic	Jose Solorio (incumbent)	36,436	65.5
Republican	Robert M. Hammond	19,273	34.5
Total votes		55,709	100.0
Democratic hold			

=== District 70 ===
California's 70th State Assembly district election, 2010
Party	Candidate	Votes	%
Republican	Donald P. Wagner	89,636	58.2
Democratic	Melissa Fox	58,208	37.8
Libertarian	Deborah Tharp	6,212	4.0
Total votes		154,056	100.0
Republican hold			

=== District 71 ===
California's 71st State Assembly district election, 2010
Party	Candidate	Votes	%
Republican	Jeff Miller (incumbent)	97,158	66.2
Democratic	Gary Kephart	49,792	33.8
Total votes		146,950	100.0
Republican hold			

=== District 72 ===
California's 72nd State Assembly district election, 2010
Party	Candidate	Votes	%
Republican	Chris Norby (incumbent)	68,751	61.4
Democratic	Esiquio Ramos Uballe	36,534	32.5
Green	Jane Rands	6,845	6.1
Total votes		112,130	100.0
Republican hold			

=== District 73 ===
California's 73rd State Assembly district election, 2010
Party	Candidate	Votes	%
Republican	Diane Harkey (incumbent)	81,164	62.0
Democratic	Judy Jones	49,846	38.0
Total votes		131,010	100.0
Republican hold			

=== District 74 ===
California's 74th State Assembly district election, 2010
Party	Candidate	Votes	%
Republican	Martin Garrick (incumbent)	81,661	55.5
Democratic	Crystal Crawford	56,033	38.1
Libertarian	Paul King	9,453	6.4
Total votes		147,147	100.0
Republican hold			

=== District 75 ===
California's 75th State Assembly district election, 2010
Party	Candidate	Votes	%
Republican	Nathan Fletcher (incumbent)	92,430	60.5
Democratic	Paul R. Garver	54,711	35.8
Libertarian	Christopher Chadwick	5,692	3.7
Total votes		152,833	100.0
Republican hold			

=== District 76 ===
California's 76th State Assembly district election, 2010
Party	Candidate	Votes	%
Democratic	Toni Atkins	75,357	57.7
Republican	Ralph Denney	48,610	37.2
Libertarian	Daniel H. Baehr	6,679	5.1
Total votes		130,646	100.0
Democratic hold			

=== District 77 ===
California's 77th State Assembly district election, 2010
Party	Candidate	Votes	%
Republican	Brian Jones	82,909	62.5
Democratic	Mark Hanson	43,674	32.9
Libertarian	Richard Belitz	6,228	4.6
Total votes		132,811	100.0
Republican hold			

=== District 78 ===
California's 78th State Assembly district election, 2010
Party	Candidate	Votes	%
Democratic	Marty Block (incumbent)	72,036	59.3
Republican	Rick L. Powell	49,455	40.7
Total votes		121,491	100.0
Democratic hold			

=== District 79 ===
California's 79th State Assembly district election, 2010
Party	Candidate	Votes	%
Democratic	Ben Hueso	46,349	62.8
Republican	Derrick Roach	27,545	37.2
Total votes		73,894	100.0
Democratic hold			

=== District 80 ===
California's 80th State Assembly district election, 2010
Party	Candidate	Votes	%
Democratic	Manuel Perez (incumbent)	58,315	58.3
Republican	Steve Sanchez	41,728	41.7
Total votes		100,043	100.0
Democratic hold			
