= Nestande =

Nestande is a surname. Notable people with the surname include:

- Brian Nestande (1964–2024), American politician
- Bruce Nestande (1938–2020), American politician, father of Brian
