= Jack A. Beaver =

American politician (1918–2012)

Member of the California State Assembly from the 73rd district
- In office January 3, 1955 – January 7, 1963
- Preceded by: L. Stewart Hinckley
- Succeeded by: L. Stewart Hinckley

Personal details
- Born: December 1, 1918 Portland, Oregon, U.S.
- Died: July 2, 2012 (aged 93) California, U.S.
- Party: Republican
- Spouse: Mary Margaret English (m. 1941)
- Children: 3

Military service
- Branch/service: United States Army
- Battles/wars: World War II; Korean War

Jack Aldred Beaver (December 1, 1918 – July 2, 2012) served in the California State Assembly for the 73rd district from 1955 to 1963 and during World War II he served in the United States Army.
