= California's 73rd State Assembly district =

American legislative district

Current assemblymember
Cottie Petrie-Norris; D–Irvine
- Population (2020) • Voting age • Citizen voting age: 500,525; 394,334; 315,422
- Demographics: 36.63% White; 1.93% Black; 21.91% Latino; 33.61% Asian; 0.12% Native American; 0.19% Hawaiian/Pacific Islander; 0.57% other; 5.03% remainder of multiracial
- Registered voters: 269,901
- Registration: 38.66% Democratic; 27.76% Republican; 27.66% No party preference

California's 73rd State Assembly district is one of 80 California State Assembly districts. It is currently represented by Democrat Cottie Petrie-Norris of Irvine.

== District profile ==
The district encompasses a large portion of central Orange County, anchored by the city of Irvine and portions of surrounding communities. It is primarily affluent and features many newly developed master-planned communities.

Orange County -

- Irvine
- Costa Mesa
- Tustin (Partial)

== Election results from statewide races ==
Year	Office	Results
2024	President	Harris 56.2 – 39.6%
2024	Senator	Schiff 56.6 – 43.4%
2022	Governor	Newsom 57.6 – 42.4%
2022	Senator	Padilla 58.9 – 41.1%
2021	Recall	Yes 57.4 – 42.6%
2020	President	Trump 50.8 – 48.1%
2018	Governor	Cox 56.2 – 43.8%
2018	Senator	Feinstein 55.6 – 44.4%
2016	President	Trump 50.4 – 43.9%
2016	Senator	Harris 56.9 – 43.1%
2014	Governor	Kashkari 62.1 – 37.9%
2012	President	Romney 59.4 – 38.7%
2012	Senator	Emken 59.7 – 40.3%

== List of assembly members representing the district ==
Due to redistricting, the 73rd district has been moved around different parts of the state. The current iteration resulted from the 2021 redistricting by the California Citizens Redistricting Commission.

Assembly members	Party	Years served	Counties represented	Notes
Arza Porter	Republican	January 5, 1885 – January 3, 1887	San Luis Obispo	
McDowell Reid Venable	Democratic	January 3, 1887 – January 7, 1889	San Luis Obispo	
D. W. James	Democratic	January 7, 1889 – January 5, 1891	San Luis Obispo	
Marcus Harloe	Republican	January 5, 1891 – January 2, 1893	San Luis Obispo	
Frank G. Finlayson	Democratic	January 2, 1893 – January 7, 1895	Los Angeles	
William Llewellyn	Republican	January 7, 1895 – January 4, 1897	Los Angeles	
William Mead	Fusion	January 4, 1897 – January 1, 1901	Los Angeles	Ran as a Democrat during his 2nd term.
William Mead	Democratic	January 4, 1897 – January 1, 1901	Los Angeles	Ran as a Democrat during his 2nd term.
Frank James	Democratic	January 1, 1901 – January 5, 1903	Los Angeles	
Jacob P. Transue	Republican	January 5, 1903 – January 2, 1911	Los Angeles	
Henry Lyon	Republican	January 2, 1911 – January 6, 1913	Los Angeles	
Howard A. Peairs	Republican	January 6, 1913 – January 4, 1915	Los Angeles	
George W. Downing	Socialist	January 4, 1915 – January 8, 1917	Los Angeles	
Henry H. Yonkin	Republican	January 8, 1917 – January 6, 1919	Los Angeles	
Elmer P. Bromley	Republican	January 6, 1919 – January 5, 1925	Los Angeles	
Howard W. Davis	Republican	January 5, 1925 – January 7, 1929	Los Angeles	He was also a member of the Los Angeles City Council while serving his 2nd term.
James E. Stockwell	Republican	January 7, 1929 – January 5, 1931	Los Angeles	
Isaac Jones	Republican	January 5, 1931 – January 2, 1933	San Bernardino	
Archibald E. Brock	Republican	January 2, 1933 – January 7, 1935	San Bernardino	
Gordon W. Corwin	Republican	January 7, 1935 – January 6, 1941	San Bernardino	
Frank C. Russell	Democratic	January 6, 1941 – January 4, 1943	San Bernardino	
Douglas P. Armstrong	Republican	January 4, 1943 – January 6, 1947	San Bernardino	
L. Stewart Hinckley	Republican	January 6, 1947 – July 31, 1954	San Bernardino	Resigned to become a director of the Farmers Home Administration USDA.
Vacant		July 31, 1954 – January 3, 1955	San Bernardino	
Jack A. Beaver	Republican	January 3, 1955 – January 7, 1963	San Bernardino	
L. Stewart Hinckley	Republican	January 7, 1963 – May 8, 1968	San Bernardino	Died in office. Died in a plane crash.
Vacant		May 8, 1968 – January 6, 1969	San Bernardino	
Jerry Lewis	Republican	January 6, 1969 – November 30, 1974	San Bernardino	
Robert H. Burke	Republican	December 2, 1974 – November 30, 1976	Orange	
Dennis Mangers	Democratic	December 6, 1976 – November 30, 1980	Orange	
Nolan Frizzelle	Republican	December 1, 1980 – November 30, 1982	Orange	
David G. Kelley	Republican	December 6, 1982 – November 30, 1992	Riverside	
Bill Morrow	Republican	December 7, 1992 – November 30, 1998	Orange, San Diego	
Patricia Bates	Republican	December 7, 1998 – November 30, 2004	Orange, San Diego	
Mimi Walters	Republican	December 6, 2004 – November 30, 2008	Orange, San Diego	
Diane Harkey	Republican	December 1, 2008 – November 30, 2014	Orange, San Diego	
Diane Harkey	Republican	December 1, 2008 – November 30, 2014	Orange	
Bill Brough	Republican	December 1, 2014 – November 30, 2020	Orange	
Laurie Davis	Republican	December 7, 2020 – November 30, 2022	Orange	
Cottie Petrie-Norris	Democratic	December 5, 2022 – present	Orange	

== Election results (1990–present) ==
=== 2024 ===
2024 California State Assembly 73rd district election
Primary election
Party	Candidate	Votes	%
Democratic	Cottie Petrie-Norris (incumbent)	45,950	56.1
Republican	Scotty Peotter	24,999	30.5
Republican	Hengameh Abraham	11,019	13.4
Total votes		81,968	100.0
General election
Democratic	Cottie Petrie-Norris (incumbent)	108,445	56.8
Republican	Scotty Peotter	82,365	43.2
Total votes		190,810	100.0
Democratic hold			

=== 2022 ===
2022 California State Assembly 73rd district election
Primary election
Party	Candidate	Votes	%
Democratic	Cottie Petrie-Norris	44,890	56.2
Republican	Steven Choi	34,957	43.8
Total votes		79,847	100.0
General election
Democratic	Cottie Petrie-Norris	75,950	55.8
Republican	Steven Choi	60,212	44.2
Total votes		136,162	100.0
Democratic gain from Republican			

=== 2020 ===
2020 California State Assembly 73rd district election
Primary election
Party	Candidate	Votes	%
Republican	Laurie Davies	41,499	27.3
Democratic	Scott Rhinehart	36,170	23.8
Democratic	Chris Duncan	27,993	18.4
Republican	Bill Brough	25,281	16.6
Republican	Ed Sachs	21,089	13.9
Total votes		152,032	100.0
General election
Republican	Laurie Davies	161,650	58.5
Democratic	Scott Rhinehart	114,578	41.5
Total votes		276,228	100.0
Republican hold			

=== 2018 ===
2018 California State Assembly 73rd district election
Primary election
Party	Candidate	Votes	%
Republican	Bill Brough (incumbent)	55,579	47.1
Democratic	Scott Rhinehart	46,436	39.4
Republican	Ed Sachs	15,981	13.5
Total votes		117,996	100.0
General election
Republican	Bill Brough (incumbent)	115,636	56.2
Democratic	Scott Rhinehart	90,016	43.8
Total votes		205,652	100.0
Republican hold			

=== 2016 ===
2016 California State Assembly 73rd district election
Primary election
Party	Candidate	Votes	%
Republican	Bill Brough (incumbent)	74,568	99.6
Democratic	Mesbah Islam (write-in)	278	0.4
Total votes		74,846	100.0
General election
Republican	Bill Brough (incumbent)	144,653	68.8
Democratic	Mesbah Islam	65,662	31.2
Total votes		210,315	100.0
Republican hold			

=== 2014 ===
2014 California State Assembly 73rd district election
Primary election
Party	Candidate	Votes	%
Democratic	Wendy Gabriella	16,420	27.8
Republican	Bill Brough	16,365	27.7
Republican	Jesse Petrilla	11,287	19.1
Republican	Paul G. Glabb	8,353	14.2
Republican	Anna Bryson	6,549	11.1
Total votes		58,974	100.0
General election
Republican	Bill Brough	76,783	67.9
Democratic	Wendy Gabriella	36,292	32.1
Total votes		113,075	100.0
Republican hold			

=== 2012 ===
2012 California State Assembly 73rd district election
Primary election
Party	Candidate	Votes	%
Republican	Diane Harkey (incumbent)	49,992	70.2
Democratic	James Corbett	21,173	29.8
Total votes		71,165	100.0
General election
Republican	Diane Harkey (incumbent)	130,030	64.3
Democratic	James Corbett	72,196	35.7
Total votes		202,226	100.0
Republican hold			

=== 2010 ===
2010 California State Assembly 73rd district election
Party	Candidate	Votes	%
Republican	Diane Harkey (incumbent)	81,164	62.0
Democratic	Judy Jones	49,846	38.0
Total votes		131,010	100.0
Republican hold			

=== 2008 ===
2008 California State Assembly 73rd district election
Party	Candidate	Votes	%
Republican	Diane Harkey	87,905	53.1
Democratic	Judy Jones	67,485	40.8
Libertarian	Andrew Favor	10,171	6.1
Total votes		165,561	100.0
Republican hold			

=== 2006 ===
2006 California State Assembly 73rd district election
Party	Candidate	Votes	%
Republican	Mimi Walters (incumbent)	75,600	73.4
Libertarian	Andrew Favor	27,412	26.6
Total votes		103,012	100.0
Republican hold			

=== 2004 ===
2004 California State Assembly 73rd district election
Party	Candidate	Votes	%
Republican	Mimi Walters	100,328	63.1
Democratic	Kathleen Calzada	50,474	31.7
Libertarian	Andrew H. Favor	8,299	5.2
Total votes		159,101	100.0
Republican hold			

=== 2002 ===
2002 California State Assembly 73rd district election
Party	Candidate	Votes	%
Republican	Patricia Bates (incumbent)	64,271	67.6
Democratic	Kathleen Calzada	27,104	28.5
Libertarian	Bob Vondruska	3,721	3.9
Total votes		95,096	100.0
Republican hold			

=== 2000 ===
2000 California State Assembly 73rd district election
Party	Candidate	Votes	%
Republican	Patricia Bates (incumbent)	93,035	64.8
Democratic	Robert D. Wilberg	40,784	28.4
Libertarian	Paul King	6,473	4.5
Natural Law	Paul Fisher	3,231	2.3
Total votes		143,523	100.0
Republican hold			

=== 1998 ===
1998 California State Assembly 73rd district election
Party	Candidate	Votes	%
Republican	Patricia Bates	71,333	66.4
Democratic	Robert D. Wilberg	31,220	29.0
Libertarian	Donald D. Rollins	3,512	3.3
Natural Law	Matteo Ornati	1,432	1.3
Total votes		107,497	100.0
Republican hold			

=== 1996 ===
1996 California State Assembly 73rd district election
Party	Candidate	Votes	%
Republican	Bill Morrow (incumbent)	85,586	63.3
Democratic	Robert D. Wilberg	36,775	27.2
Natural Law	Catherine Carter	12,935	9.6
Total votes		135,296	100.0
Republican hold			

=== 1994 ===
1994 California State Assembly 73rd district election
Party	Candidate	Votes	%
Republican	Bill Morrow (incumbent)	74,942	66.3
Democratic	Lee Walker	31,665	28.0
Libertarian	B. Wade Hostler	4,508	4.0
Peace and Freedom	Tonatluh Ridriguez-Nikl	1,936	1.7
Total votes		113,051	100.00
Republican hold			

=== 1992 ===
1992 California State Assembly 73rd district election
Party	Candidate	Votes	%
Republican	Bill Morrow	76,862	54.4
Democratic	Lee Walker	52,952	37.4
Libertarian	Paul H. King	6,699	4.7
Peace and Freedom	Paul A. Steele	4,889	3.5
Total votes		141,402	100.0
Republican hold			

=== 1990 ===
1990 California State Assembly 73rd district election
Party	Candidate	Votes	%
Republican	David G. Kelley (incumbent)	70,161	56.2
Democratic	Ray Strait	54,716	43.8
Total votes		124,877	100.0
Republican hold			

== See also ==
- California State Assembly
- California State Assembly districts
- Districts in California
