= Martin Garrick =

American politician

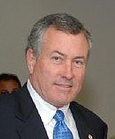

Minority Leader of the California Assembly
- In office February 1, 2010 – November 30, 2010
- Preceded by: Sam Blakeslee
- Succeeded by: Connie Conway

Member of the California State Assembly from the 74th district
- In office December 4, 2006 – November 30, 2012
- Preceded by: Mark Wyland
- Succeeded by: Allan Mansoor

Personal details
- Born: Martin Welsh Garrick; March 24, 1953 (age 73) Glendale, California
- Party: Republican
- Spouse: Jane Garrick
- Children: 4
- Education: California Western University; United States International University
- Occupation: President, Admiral Property Company

Martin W. Garrick (born March 24, 1953) is an American politician who served in the California State Assembly from 2006 to 2012 and was Minority Leader in 2010. Garrick also served in the Reagan Administration and is a small business owner.

== Early life and education ==
A native Californian, Martin Garrick was born in Glendale, California. He graduated from California Western/United States International University in San Diego with a B.S. in Business Administration and an emphasis in marketing and economics.

== Early political career ==
In the 1980s, Garrick joined the Ronald Reagan for President Campaign at national headquarters in Arlington, Virginia. He then moved to the White House transition team and thereafter into a number of positions in the Reagan Administration, including Deputy Senate House Liaison. After leaving the Reagan Administration, Garrick founded Admiral Industries, Inc., a telecommunications company. He also owns and manages Admiral Property Company, a real estate investment firm.

== California State Assembly ==
Garrick was elected to the California State Assembly in 2006 and represents the 74th district which includes the communities of Del Mar, Solana Beach, Encinitas, Carlsbad, Vista, San Marcos, Escondido and parts of Oceanside, Rancho Santa Fe, Lake Hodges, Valley Center and San Diego.

== 760 area code ==
Garrick led a successful campaign in 2008 to reverse the California Public Utilities Commission's decided to designate a significant portion of San Diego County to a new 442 area code. As an alternative, Garrick called for the creation of an area code overlay so that 760 and 442 could serve the same region. On October 16, 2008 the CPUC reversed its decision and agreed with Garrick to create the overlay for the North County San Diego region as a way to address the projected shortage of available telephone numbers in the 760 area code.

== Community and party activity ==
Garrick has been active for decades in Republican organizations and campaigns. As First Vice Chairman of the San Diego Republican Party, Garrick played a major role in the building of one of the nation's most effective local parties. For a decade, he served as a Board Member in the San Diego Lincoln Club, and as a member of the Adam Smith Institute and San Diego County Republican Party Central Committee. His official biography describes him as a lifelong conservative advocate.

Additionally, Garrick's community activism included roles on the Solana Beach Crime Commission, Solana Beach Budget Committee, and the San Diego County Cable and Television Review Committee.
