= L. Stewart Hinckley =

American politician

Member of the California State Assembly from the 73rd district
- In office January 7, 1963 - May 8, 1968
- Preceded by: Jack A. Beaver
- Succeeded by: Jerry Lewis
- In office January 6, 1947 - July 31, 1954
- Preceded by: Douglas P. Armstrong
- Succeeded by: Jack A. Beaver

Personal details
- Born: November 23, 1902 Bryn Mawr, California, US
- Died: May 8, 1969 (aged 66) Page, Arizona, US
- Party: Republican
- Spouse: Bertha Craig (m. 1927 d. 1969)
- Children: Nancy Silberberger and Stewart Craig

Military service
- Branch/service: United States Army
- Battles/wars: World War II

L. Stewart Hinckley (November 23, 1902 – May 8, 1969) served as a member of the California State Assembly from the 73rd district. He was a Republican. During World War II he served in the United States Army.

Hinckley was born November 23, 1902, in Bryn Mawr, California. He died when the small plane he and his wife were flying near Page, Arizona, crashed on May 8, 1969.
