= Bruce Sumner =

American politician (1924–2018)

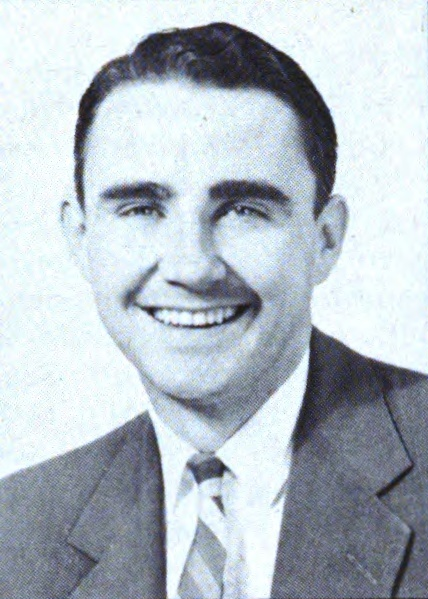
- Official portrait, 1961

Member of the California State Assembly from the 74th district
- In office January 7, 1957 – January 7, 1963
- Preceded by: Earl W. Stanley
- Succeeded by: Gordon Cologne

Personal details
- Born: July 1, 1924 Bozeman, Montana, U.S.
- Died: March 25, 2018 (aged 93) Newport Beach, California, U.S.
- Party: Republican
- Other political affiliations: Democratic (after 1971)
- Spouse(s): Virginia Ann Kuck (m. 1947, divorced) Susan Sumner (m. 1988)
- Children: 2

Military service
- Branch/service: United States Marine Corps
- Battles/wars: World War II; Korean War

Bruce Wilson Sumner (July 1, 1924 – March 25, 2018) was a Republican member of the California State Assembly and later a presiding judge for the Orange County Superior Court.

== Life and career ==
Sumner served in the United States Marines at the end of World War II and later served in the Korean War where he received six battle stars, three presidential unit citations and a ketter of commendation with the combat letter “V.” He retired from the Marine Reserve as a Lieutenant Colonel and continued to serve on the Board of Directors of the November 10th Association. As a lawyer he was a Deputy Public Defender, and later a partner at Kindel & Anderson.

In 1957, Sumner became a member of the California State Legislature as an Assemblyman where he served as Chair of the Judiciary Committee. As an Assemblyman from the moderate to liberal wing of the California Republican Party, he carried the enabling legislation for projects such as Dana Point Harbor, the University of California, Irvine and California State University, Fullerton – all milestones in the development of Orange County that make a material contribution to the quality and substance of today's unique and enviable quality of life. He worked alongside fellow Republican State Senator John A. Murdy, Jr. and Democratic State Assemblyman Richard Hanna on bipartisan legislation for six years. In 1962, Sumner served as head of Senator Thomas Kuchel's reelection campaign to the Senate.

Sumner's support for anti-discrimination practices, housing laws and opposition to Proposition 14 angered the conservatives of Orange County, and he would suffer defeat at the hands of John Birch Society member John G. Schmitz for the vacated Senate seat of Sumner's friend Murdy, Jr., despite having the endorsement of local newspapers. Disillusioned with the rightward shift of the California Republican Party, Sumner became a Democrat in 1971.

As a distinguished member of the judiciary, Sumner served as the Presiding Judge ("PJ") for the Orange County Superior Court. He also served as PJ in the Probate and Juvenile departments. He was a faculty member at the Judges' College, and a frequent lecturer on trial tactics. He was selected as Judge of the Year by the Trial Lawyers' Association. Perhaps his highest honor as a judge was having received the Franklin G. West award – the top award for Orange County's most outstanding jurist. As a statesman, He headed the Constitutional Revision Commission that redrafted the entire California State Constitution. Judge Sumner was also active in Human Rights as a member of Amnesty International where he presided over alleged human rights violations in Chile and Rhodesia. He also edited the Courts Martial procedures for the military justice system for the US Defense Department as special counsel for Secretary of Defense Caspar Weinberger. A lifelong swimmer, Judge Sumner won five gold medals in the Senior Olympics. As an expression of his enthusiasm for swimming, he served as Chair of the swimming division of the Modern Pentathlon during the 1984 Summer Olympics in Los Angeles.

After leaving the bench in 1985, Sumner was involved in private judging and was appointed the Trustee for a failing bank's trust department. He subsequently appointed Mosier & Company as the administrator to recover $10 million for 64 pension plans belonging to 32 doctors. The effort was called the 1985 Sumner Trust.
