= Robert C. Frazee =

American politician

Member of the California State Assembly from the 74th district
- In office December 6, 1982 - November 30, 1994
- Preceded by: Marian Bergeson
- Succeeded by: Howard Kaloogian

Member of the California State Assembly from the 76th district
- In office December 4, 1978 - November 30, 1982
- Preceded by: William A. Craven
- Succeeded by: Bill Bradley

Personal details
- Born: September 1, 1928 San Luis Rey, California, US
- Died: January 24, 2009 (aged 80) Bora Bora, French Polynesia
- Party: Republican
- Spouse: Dolores Hedrick (m. 1951)
- Children: 2

Military service
- Branch/service: United States Marine Corps
- Battles/wars: Korean War

Robert Chauncey Frazee (September 1, 1928 – January 24, 2009) was an American businessman and politician.

Born in San Luis Rey, California, Frazee graduated from Oceanside High School.

== Career ==
Frazee served in the United States Marines Corp during the Korean War and was a radio technician. Frazee owned Frazee Flowers in Carlsbad, California. He served on the Carlsbad City Council from 1972 to 1974 and then served as mayor of Carlsbad from 1972 to 1978. Frazee was a Republican.

On November 7, 1978, Frazee won the election and became a Republican member of California State Assembly for District 76. Frazee defeated Austin Childs with 67.15% of the votes. He served in the California State Assembly from 1979 to 1994.

== Personal life ==
Frazee's wife is Dolores Hedrick. They have two children. On January 24, 2009, Frazee died suddenly of a heart attack near Bora Bora, French Polynesia, while on a cruise in the South Pacific.
