= Nolan Frizzelle =

American optometrist and politician

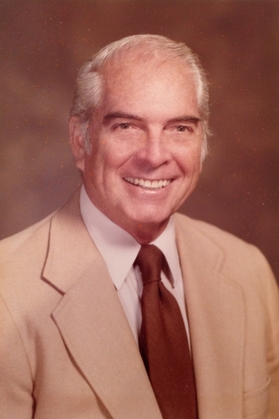

Member of the California State Assembly from the 69th district
- In office December 6, 1982 – November 30, 1992
- Preceded by: Ross Johnson
- Succeeded by: Tom Umberg

Member of the California State Assembly from the 73rd district
- In office December 1, 1980 – November 30, 1982
- Preceded by: Dennis Mangers
- Succeeded by: David G. Kelley

Personal details
- Born: October 16, 1921 Los Angeles, California, US
- Died: January 31, 2013 (aged 91) Folsom, California, US
- Party: Republican
- Spouse: Ina
- Children: 6
- Education: UCLA; USC

Military service
- Branch/service: United States Marine Corps
- Battles/wars: World War II

Nolan Frizzelle (October 16, 1921 – January 31, 2013) was a Republican politician who represented Orange County in the California State Assembly from 1980 until 1992. In 1992, he was defeated for renomination by Doris Allen after they were redistricted into the same district.

== Legislative career ==
Frizzelle's political activity began in 1954 in Pasadena, California, where he led a movement to challenge the Pasadena public school decision to stop enforcing correct spelling in grammar school. That challenge culminated in the removal of the superintendent. After a move to Orange County in 1955, Frizzelle became active in the Christian Anticommunism Crusade and built a network of conservative contacts in the area. Based on that network he was elected President of the unofficial California Republican Assembly (CRA) and used the influence of that organization to help the conservative Barry Goldwater win the Republican presidential nomination over the liberal candidate Nelson Rockefeller, at the Republican Convention in San Francisco in 1964.

A cohort in the Goldwater campaign was the political columnist Ronald Reagan. In 1964, when conservative Republicans needed a candidate to challenge the incumbent California Gov. Pat Brown, Frizzelle helped convince Reagan to run by providing the first organizational endorsement of Reagan's campaign, from the CRA. Reagan originally asked Frizzelle to run as his candidate for Lt Gov, but later reconsidered and recruited the more moderate Bob Finch for the role. Reagan outdistanced other Republican candidates for Governor, including Joe Shell from southern California and Warren Christopher from San Francisco, and ultimately won the 1966 general election as Governor of California.

Frizzelle was President of the Rotary Club of Newport and a member of the Newport-Mesa School District Board before running unsuccessfully for California Assembly in 1978. In 1980, Frizzelle ran again and defeated three-term Democratic Assemblyman Dennis Mangers, who had been elected as part of the Democratic wave following the Watergate scandal in 1974. Frizzelle represented Orange County's 73rd District, which became the 69th District after the 1980 redistricting. Frizzelle served in the Assembly until 1992. While in the Assembly he authored several bills to permit toll roads as part of the state's freeway system.

=== 1991 State Senate Special Election ===
He lost a special election primary to succeed John Seymour in the California State Senate after Seymour had been appointed to the US Senate by Gov. Pete Wilson. Frizzelle received 17.8% of the vote.

=== 1992 Primary ===
Frizzelle was defeated for renomination 1992. He faced Tom Mays and Doris Allen, both fellow assembly members redistricted into the new 67th district. Allen received 41% of the vote, Mays received 39% of the vote while Frizzelle received just 20% of the vote.

== Personal ==
Frizzelle was born in Los Angeles, California and graduated from Beverly Hills High School. He left Stanford University to become a Marine officer in World War II. He later graduated from UCLA and from the USC College of Optometry in 1949. He and his father Charles practiced optometry together in Los Angeles, until Nolan began his own practice in Newport Beach in 1959. Nolan and his wife Mary met at UCLA, raised four children and divorced when the last left for college. Four years later Nolan married Ina Evans and they raised her two children together. He had homes in Huntington Beach and in Folsom, California, where he died, aged 91.

California Assembly
Preceded by Dennis Mangers	California State Assemblyman, 73rd District; December 1, 1980 – November 30, 1982	Succeeded by David G. Kelley
Preceded by Ross Johnson	California State Assemblyman, 69th District; December 6, 1982 – November 30, 1992	Succeeded by Tom Umberg
