= Bill Brough =

American politician (born 1966)

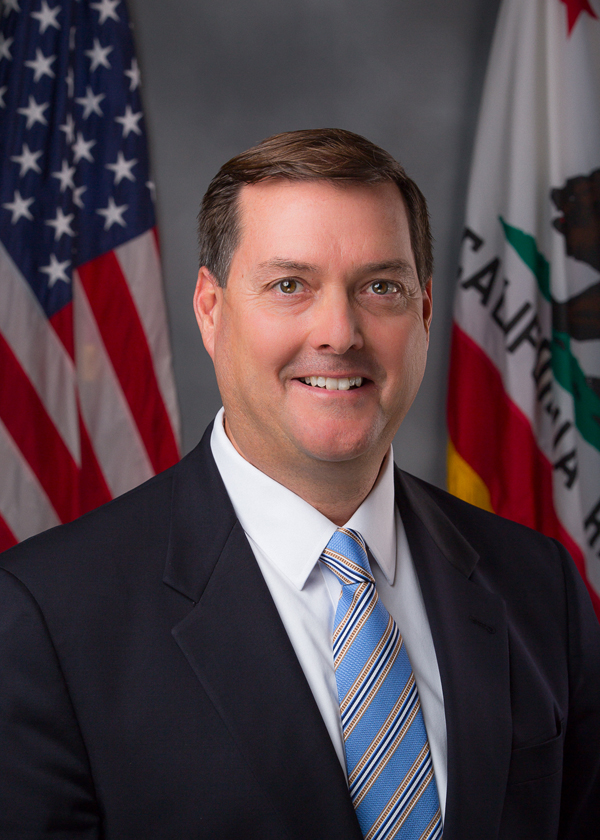
- Official portrait, 2014

Member of the California State Assembly from the 73rd district
- In office December 1, 2014 – November 30, 2020
- Preceded by: Diane Harkey
- Succeeded by: Laurie Davies

Personal details
- Born: William Brough; October 15, 1966 (age 59) Middletown, Connecticut, U.S.
- Party: Republican
- Education: University of Connecticut (BA)

Military service
- Branch/service: United States Army
- Years of service: 1986–1990

William P. Brough (/broʊ/, BROH; born October 15, 1966) is an American politician who served three terms in the California State Assembly. A Republican, he represented the 73rd district, encompassing southern Orange County. Prior to being elected to the state legislature, he was a Dana Point City Councilmember. Previously, Brough served as chief of staff to California State Assemblywoman Diane Harkey, White House liaison at the Department of Veterans Affairs in the George W. Bush administration, and aide to former congressman Christopher Cox. In 2016, he founded the California Legislative Irish Caucus.

== Personal life ==
After high school, Brough enlisted in the U.S. Army, serving on active duty 1986–1990, and graduated from the University of Connecticut in 1995. Brough and his wife have two children.

== Sexual harassment and violence allegations ==
In June 2019, two women accused Brough of making unwanted sexual advances to them in public settings. Orange County Supervisor Lisa Bartlett charged that Brough cornered her in a local restaurant in March 2011, when both were serving on the Dana Point City Council, and pressed his groin against her. After she broke free and left, she filed a complaint against him with the city. Also, a Laguna Beach real estate agent who worked on campaigns for Bartlett and Brough, said Brough harassed her about five years prior, before he was sworn into the state Assembly in 2014. Brough has denied the allegations.

On May 27, 2020, Brough was stripped of all his committee assignments after the California State Assembly Workplace Conduct Unit found that Brough had improperly touched and propositioned female staff members, including impliedly offering political favors in exchange for sexual activity. In 2020, The Orange County Register reported that at least six women accused Brough of sexual assault or harassment over the previous decade.

In spite of the sexual harassment allegations against him, Brough sought reelection to a fourth term in 2020. He was soundly defeated in the primary, coming in fourth place. Laguna Niguel Mayor Laurie Davies, a fellow Republican, went on to win the general election.

== Campaign finance allegations ==
In August 2019, the California Ethics Commission announced it would investigate Brough's alleged misuse of $200,000 IN campaign funds. He is charged with spending campaign contributions to pay off his family's cell phone bill, eat at expensive restaurants, and take a personal trip to a Boston Red Sox game, among other personal expenditures. The total payments in question since he took office add up to nearly $200,000.

== 2014 California State Assembly ==
California's 73rd State Assembly district election, 2014
Primary election
Party	Candidate	Votes	%
Democratic	Wendy Gabriella	16,420	27.8
Republican	Bill Brough	16,365	27.7
Republican	Jesse Petrilla	11,287	19.1
Republican	Paul G. Glabb	8,353	14.2
Republican	Anna Bryson	6,549	11.1
Total votes		58,974	100.0
General election
Republican	Bill Brough	76,783	67.9
Democratic	Wendy Gabriella	36,292	32.1
Total votes		113,075	100.0
Republican hold			

== 2016 California State Assembly ==
California's 73rd State Assembly district election, 2016
Primary election
Party	Candidate	Votes	%
Republican	Bill Brough (incumbent)	74,568	99.6
Democratic	Mesbah Islam (write-in)	278	0.4
Total votes		74,846	100.0
General election
Republican	Bill Brough (incumbent)	144,653	68.8
Democratic	Mesbah Islam	65,662	31.2
Total votes		210,315	100.0
Republican hold			

== 2018 California State Assembly ==
California's 73rd State Assembly district election, 2018
Primary election
Party	Candidate	Votes	%
Republican	Bill Brough (incumbent)	55,579	47.1
Democratic	Scott Rhinehart	46,436	39.4
Republican	Ed Sachs	15,981	13.5
Total votes		117,996	100.0
General election
Republican	Bill Brough (incumbent)	115,636	56.2
Democratic	Scott Rhinehart	90,016	43.8
Total votes		205,652	100.0
Republican hold			

== 2020 California State Assembly ==
2020 California's 73rd State Assembly district election
Primary election
Party	Candidate	Votes	%
Republican	Laurie Davies	32,514	27.5%
Democratic	Scott Rhinehart	27,026	22.8%
Democratic	Chris Duncan	21,838	18.4%
Republican	Bill Brough (incumbent)	20,281	17.1%
Republican	Ed Sachs	16,711	14.1%
Total votes		152,032	100.0%
General election
Republican	Laurie Davies	136,264	57.3%
Democratic	Scott Rhinehart	101,723	42.7%
Total votes		237,987	100.0%
