= San Luis Rey, Oceanside, California =

Neighborhood in Oceanside, California, United States

San Luis Rey
- Neighborhood of Oceanside
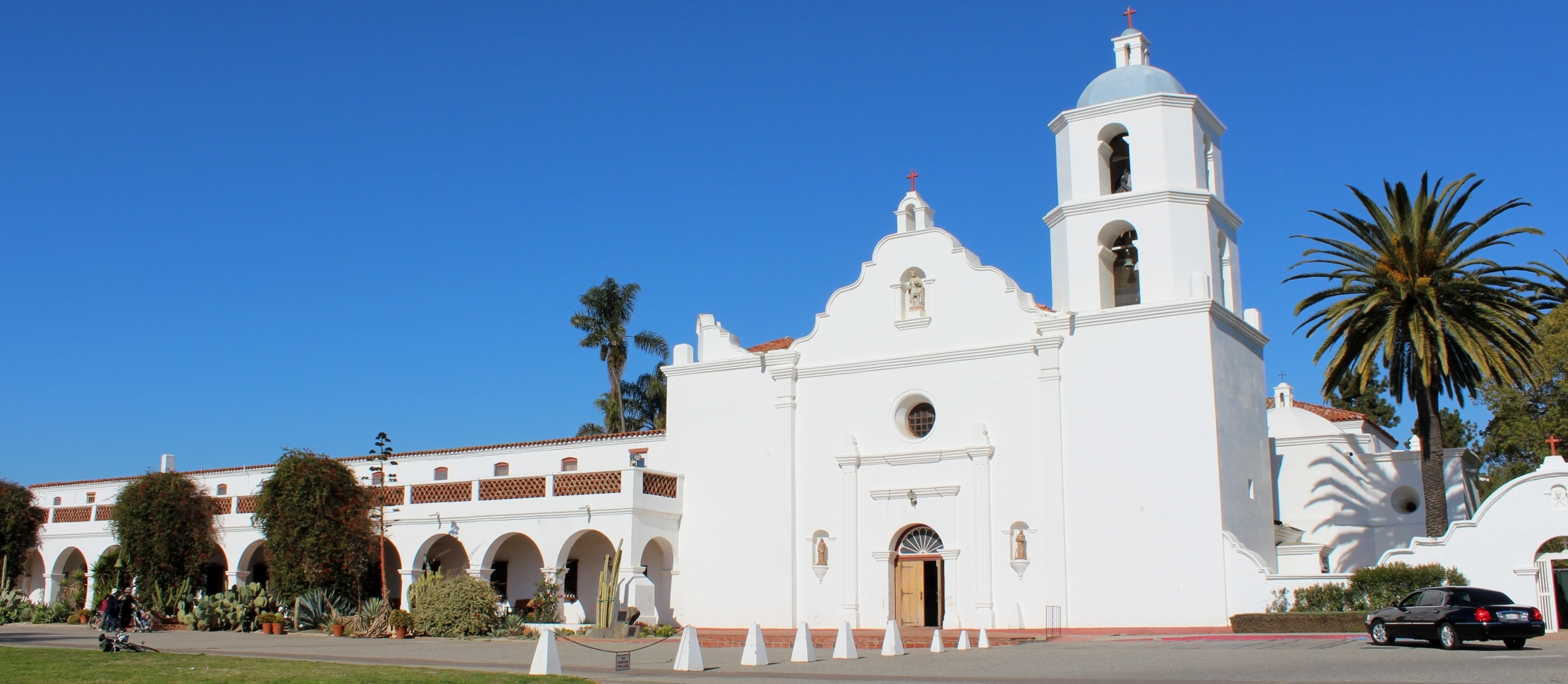
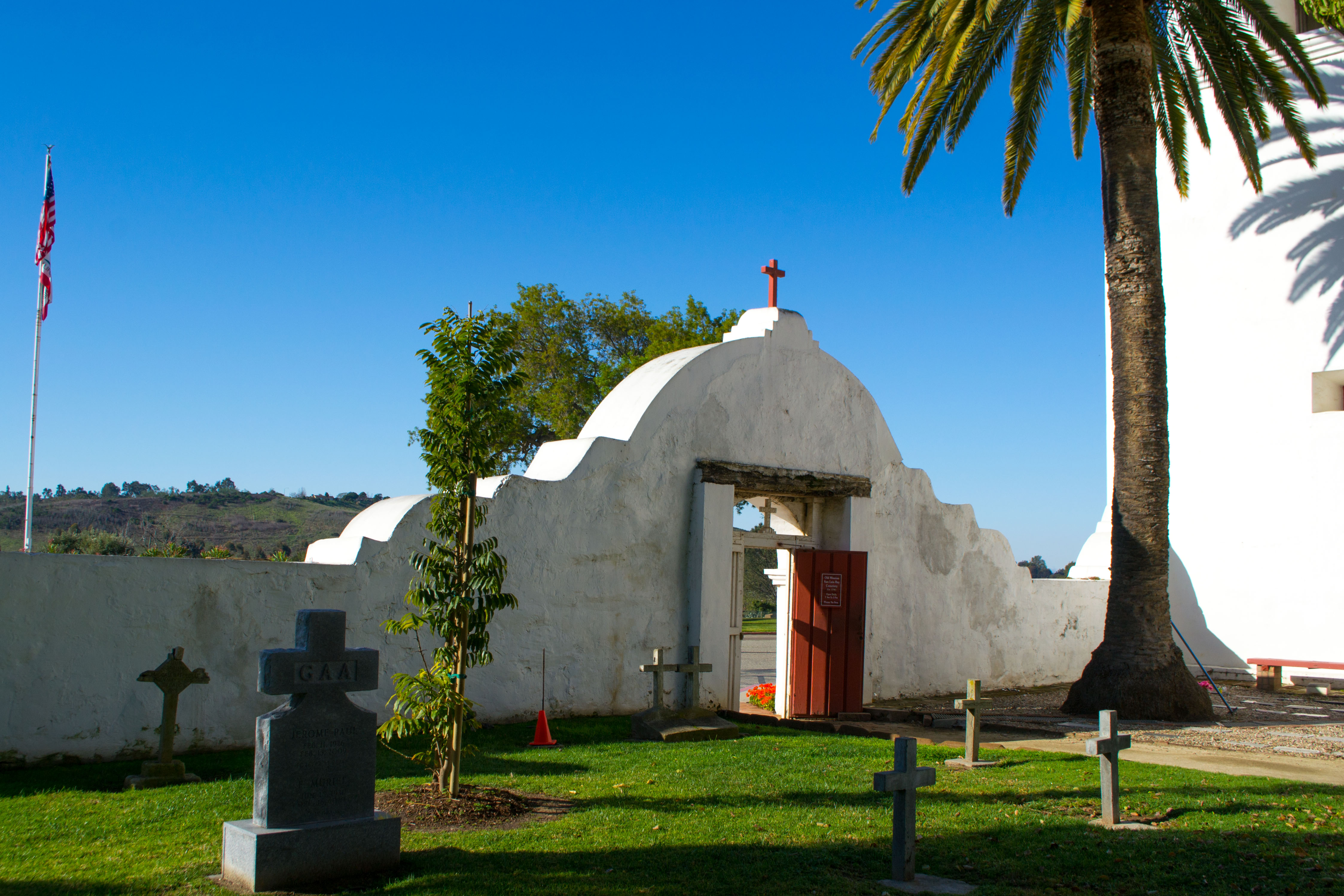
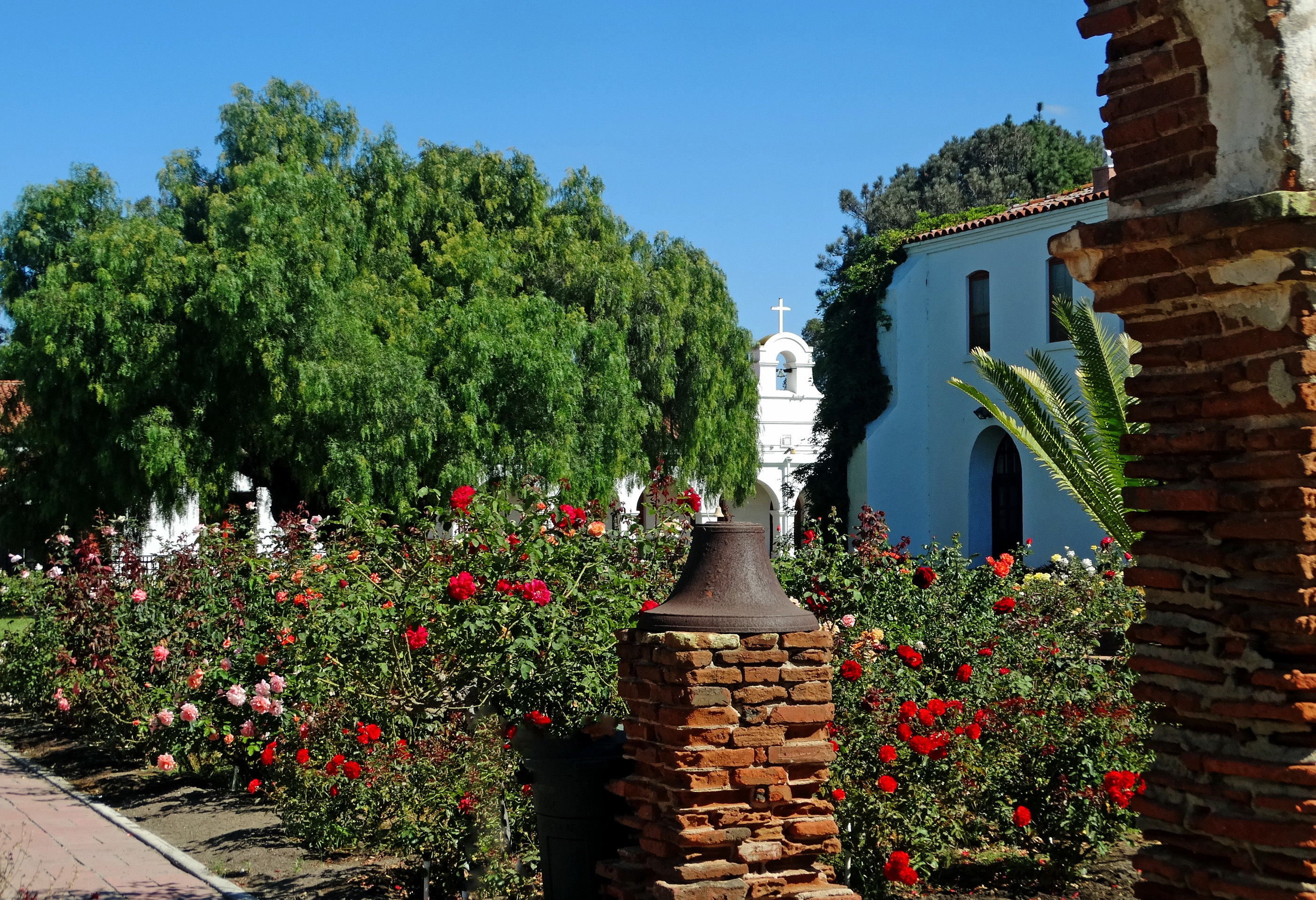
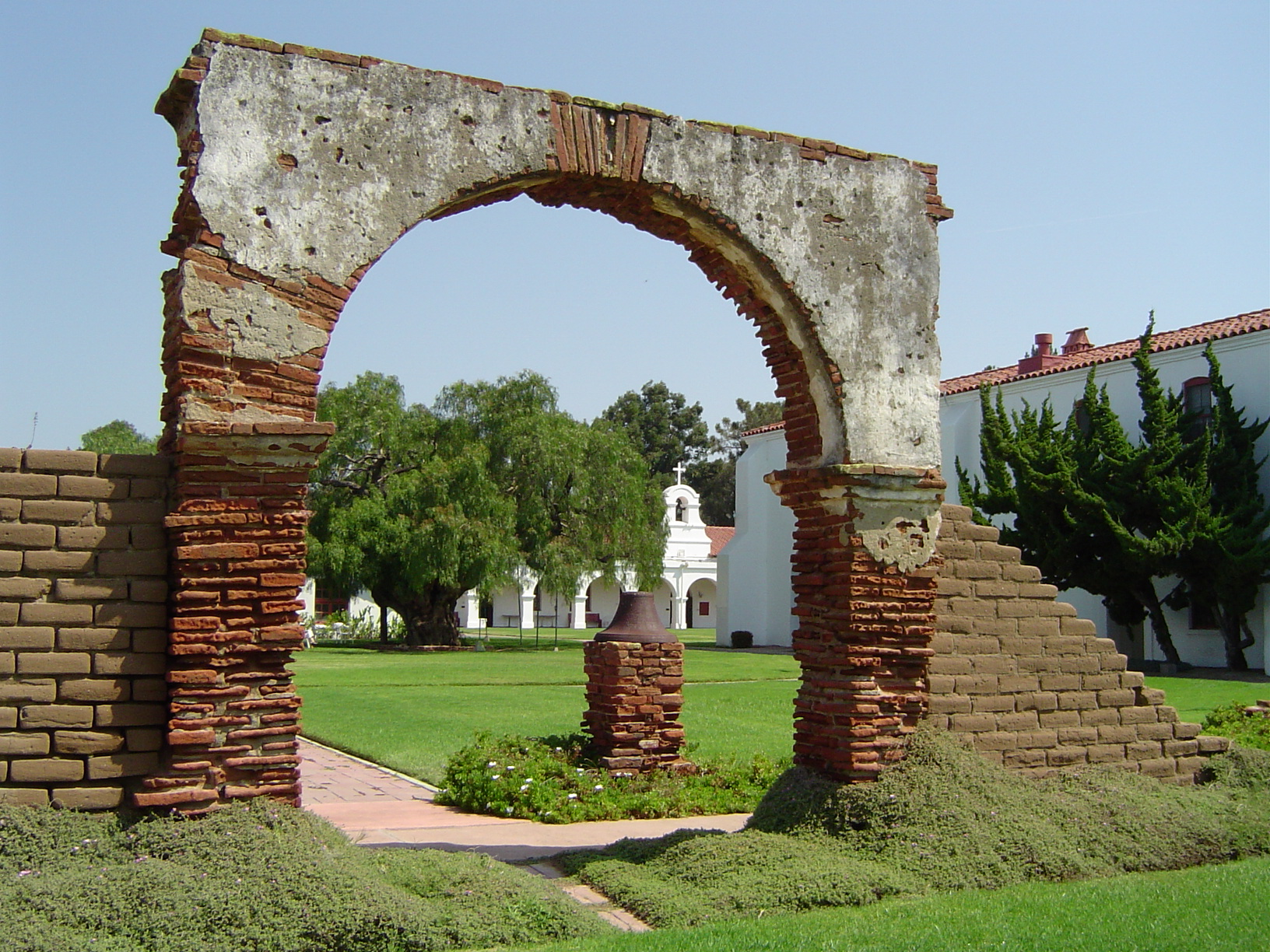
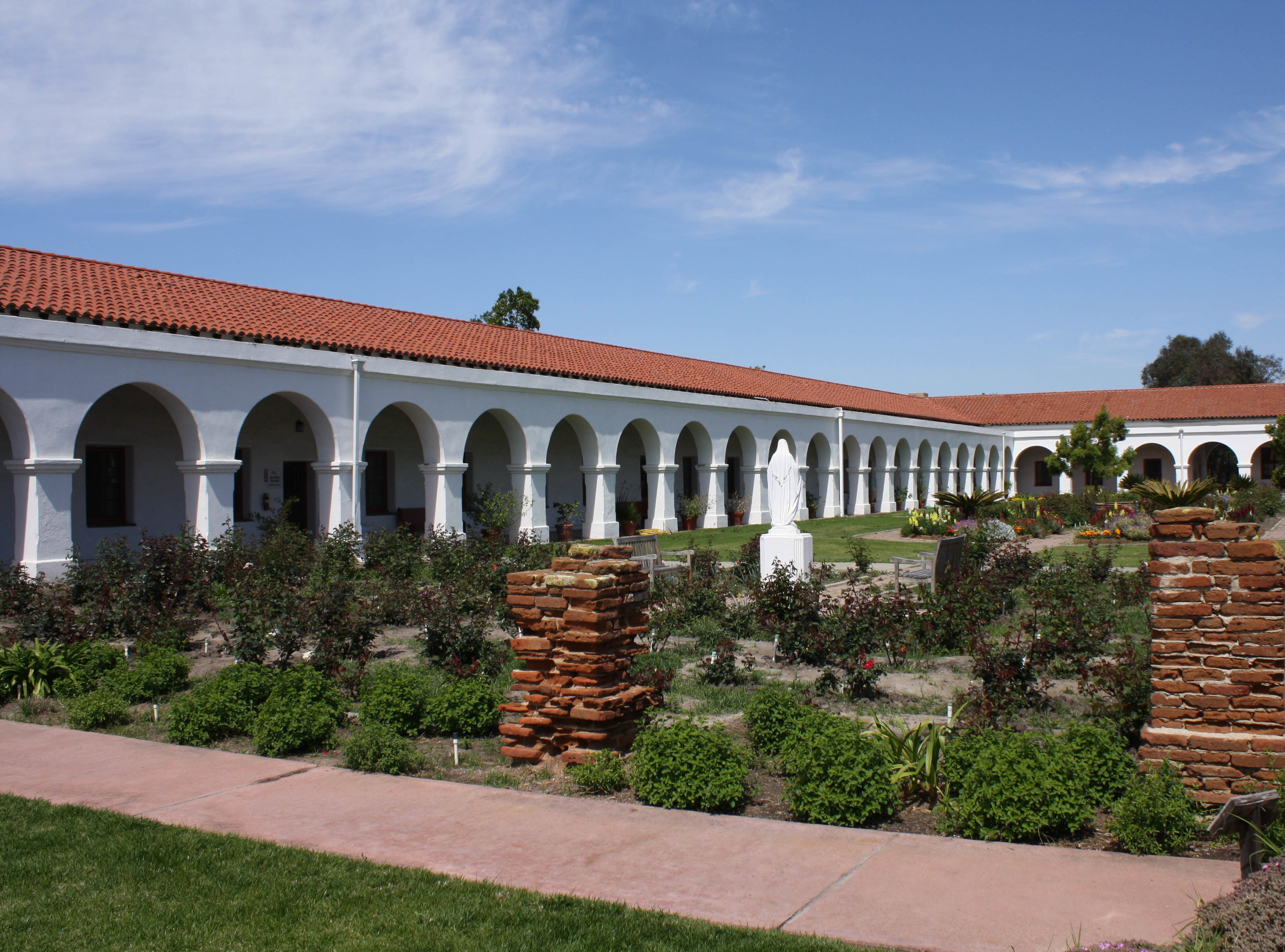
- Mission San Luis Rey de Francia

- Location within California Location within the United States
- Coordinates: 33°13′55″N 117°19′25″W
- Country: United States
- State: California
- County: San Diego
- Elevation: 59 ft (18 m)
- Time zone: UTC-8 (Pacific (PST))
  - Summer (DST): UTC-7 (PDT)
- ZIP code: 92057, 92068
- Area codes: 442 & 760
- GNIS feature ID: 1661386

San Luis Rey (Spanish for "St. Louis the King") is a neighborhood in Oceanside, California. San Luis Rey is along the San Luis Rey River, 4 miles (6.4 km) northeast of downtown Oceanside. San Luis Rey has a post office with ZIP Code 92068, which opened in 1861.

== History ==
=== Quechla / Qée'ish ===
The area that is now known as San Luis Rey was originally home to the Luiseño. The Luiseño had a village of 5,000 people which was called Quechla or Qée'ish depending on dialect.

=== San Luis Rey ===
The community was named for Mission San Luis Rey de Francia, established in 1798, which is located near the geographic center of the neighborhood. The population of Quechla dropped down to 3,000 people soon after the establishment of the Mission due to diseases brought by the Spanish. This Mission at one point covered 950,000 acres and was tended by the Luiseño Indians, who were forcibly moved onto the Mission to work under the Spanish. Due to the extensive and long-lived influence of the Spanish and later the Mexican government, local architecture has taken on a noticeable Spanish and Mexican feel.

=== Neighborhood of Oceanside ===
The neighborhood also includes the Heritage Park Village and museum, which was the center of town for the city of Oceanside for a time.

The Lilac Fire broke out on December 7, 2017, severely damaging the 240-acre San Luis Rey Downs horse-training facility and killing 46 horses.

== Native American culture ==
The original residents of the valley now called San Luis Rey were Luiseño Indians, also known as the San Luis Rey Band of the Luiseño Indians. Although in other parts of the United States Native Americans were allowed to live autonomously on reservations, such an arrangement was denied to the Luiseño Indians because the settlers wanted to keep the land for farming and ranching. Native Americans were granted US citizenship in 1924.

Since 1996 the band hosts an annual inter-tribal powwow on the San Luis Rey Mission grounds, which is open to the public and presents Native American arts, crafts, food and dancing. On November 28, in honor of National Native American Heritage Month, the San Luis Rey city Council acknowledged the Mission Indians at its council meeting.

== Climate ==
According to the Köppen climate classification system, San Luis Rey has a warm-summer Mediterranean climate, abbreviated "Csa" on climate maps.

== Demographics ==
This community has a notably high percentage of US military personnel due to its close proximity to Camp Pendleton.

== Notable people ==
- Robert C. Frazee, California businessman and politician, was born in San Luis Rey.
