= Laurie Davies (politician) =

American politician

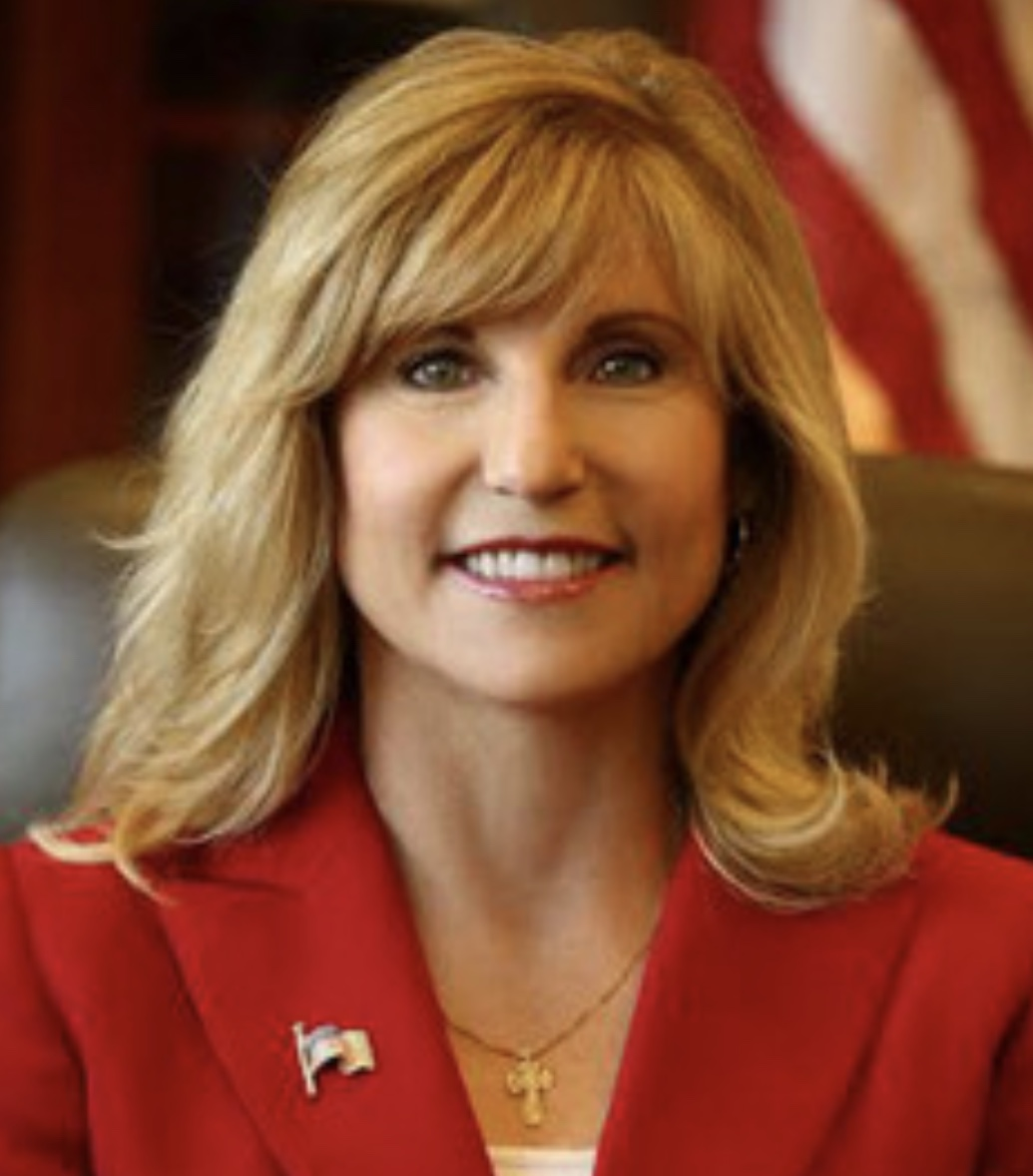

Member of the California State Assembly
- Incumbent
- Assumed office December 7, 2020
- Preceded by: Bill Brough
- Succeeded by: Sergio Farias (elect)
- Constituency: 73rd district (2020–2022); 74th district (2022–present)

Personal details
- Born: Laurie Ann Davies; February 27, 1962 (age 64) Fond du Lac, Wisconsin
- Party: Republican
- Spouse: Neil Skewes
- Education: California State University, Long Beach
- Occupation: Events manager, wedding planner
- daviesforca.com assembly.ca.gov/davies

Laurie Ann Davies (born February 27, 1962) is an American politician who serves in the California State Assembly. A Republican, she represents the 74th district, including southern Orange County, including Laguna Niguel, Dana Point, San Juan Capistrano, and San Clemente.

Before her career in politics she was a wedding planner. Prior to her election to the State Assembly, she was a member of the Laguna Niguel City Council from 2012 to 2020 and was mayor in 2016 and 2020. She was elected to the assembly in 2020, defeating incumbent Republican Bill Brough in the primary and Democratic businessman Scott Reinhart in the general election.

== Political positions ==
Davies organized a letter-writing coalition urging the South Coast Air Quality Management District to reject rules that would phase out natural-gas space and water heaters, calling the proposal costly for working families. Environmental groups accused signatories of obstructing climate-policy goals.

== Electoral history ==
2020 California State Assembly 73rd district election
Primary election
Party	Candidate	Votes	%
Republican	Laurie Davies	41,499	27.3
Democratic	Scott Rhinehart	36,170	23.8
Democratic	Chris Duncan	27,993	18.4
Republican	Bill Brough (incumbent)	25,281	16.6
Republican	Ed Sachs	21,089	13.9
Total votes		151,982	100.0
General election
Republican	Laurie Davies	161,650	58.5
Democratic	Scott Rhinehart	114,578	41.5
Total votes		276,228	100.0
Republican hold			

2022 California State Assembly 74th district election
Primary election
Party	Candidate	Votes	%
Republican	Laurie Davies (incumbent)	60,568	53.9
Democratic	Chris Duncan	51,768	46.1
Total votes		112,336	100.0
General election
Republican	Laurie Davies (incumbent)	91,637	52.6
Democratic	Chris Duncan	82,466	47.4
Total votes		174,103	100.0
Republican gain from Democratic			

2024 California State Assembly 74th district election
Primary election
Party	Candidate	Votes	%
Republican	Laurie Davies (incumbent)	64,187	55.4
Democratic	Chris Duncan	51,731	44.6
Total votes		115,918	100.0
General election
Republican	Laurie Davies (incumbent)	117,208	50.8
Democratic	Chris Duncan	113,338	49.2
Total votes		230,546	100.0
Republican hold			
