= Robert H. Burke =

American politician (1922–2003)

Member of the California State Assembly from the 73rd district
- In office December 2, 1974 - November 30, 1976
- Preceded by: Jerry Lewis
- Succeeded by: Dennis Mangers

Member of the California State Assembly from the 70th district
- In office January 6, 1967 - November 30, 1974
- Preceded by: James Edward Whetmore
- Succeeded by: Bruce Nestande

Personal details
- Born: July 16, 1922 Des Moines, Iowa, US
- Died: September 26, 2003 (aged 81) Wailuku, Hawaii, US
- Party: Republican
- Spouse: Claire Spencer (m. 1954)
- Children: 3

Military service
- Branch/service: United States Air Force; United States Army
- Battles/wars: World War II

Robert Henry Burke (July 16, 1922 – September 26, 2003) was an American politician in California.

== Early life and education ==
Born in Des Moines, Iowa, Burke served in the United States Army Air Forces during World War II and was a pilot. He enlisted in the United States Army on February 1, 1943, and served until July 30, 1946. He received his bachelor's degree from University of California, Berkeley in engineering.

== Career ==
In 1963, Burke moved to Huntington Beach, California and worked for Signal Oil and Gas. Burke served on the Huntington Beach School District Board from 1964 to 1966. Burke served in the California State Assembly from 1966 to 1976 and was a Republican.

== Later life ==
Burke lived in Kihei, Hawaii. He died at Maui Memorial Hospital in Wailuku, Hawaii.
