= Dennis Mangers =

American politician

Member of the California State Assembly from the 73rd district
- In office December 6, 1976 - November 30, 1980
- Preceded by: Robert H. Burke
- Succeeded by: Nolan Frizzelle

Personal details
- Born: October 13, 1940 (age 85) Inglewood, California, US
- Party: Democratic
- Spouse(s): Linda Axenty (m. 1962, div. 1984); Michael Sestak (m. 2008)
- Children: 2
- Education: AA, El Camino College, 1960; BA California State College, Long Beach; MS, USC, 1968

Military service
- Branch/service: United States Navy

Dennis Mangers (born October 13, 1940, in Inglewood, California) is an American Democratic politician from California.

== Life ==
Mangers was a member of the California State Assembly for the 73rd district from Orange County from 1974 to 1980. He ultimately lost re-election to Nolan Frizzelle. After leaving elected office, Mangers worked as a lobbyist. Mangers is married to Michael Sestak and has two children from his previous relationship with Linda Axenty.
