= Gordon W. Corwin =

American politician (1900–1968)

Member of the California State Assembly from the 73rd district
- In office January 7, 1935 - January 6, 1941
- Preceded by: Archibald E. Brock
- Succeeded by: Frank C. Russell

Personal details
- Born: June 17, 1900 Highland, California, US
- Died: December 29, 1968 (aged 68)
- Party: Republican
- Children: 1

Military service
- Branch/service: United States Army
- Battles/wars: World War I

Gordon W. Corwin (June 17, 1900 - December 29, 1968) served in the California State Assembly for the 73rd district from 1935 to 1941 and during World War I he served in the United States Army.
