= California's 74th State Assembly district =

American legislative district

Current assemblymember
Laurie Davies; R–Laguna Niguel
- Population (2010) • Voting age • Citizen voting age: 470,248; 382,309; 326,040
- Demographics: 63.16% White; 1.34% Black; 15.44% Latino; 18.46% Asian; 0.49% Native American; 0.34% Hawaiian/Pacific Islander; 0.30% other; 0.47% remainder of multiracial
- Registered voters: 288,847
- Registration: 35.42% Republican; 35.03% Democratic; 24.59% No party preference

California's 74th State Assembly district is one of 80 California State Assembly districts. It is currently represented by California Republican Laurie Davies.

== District profile ==
The district encompasses coastal southern Orange County and northern San Diego County The district is primarily suburban and affluent.

Orange County

- Laguna Niguel
- San Juan Capistrano
- Dana Point
- San Clemente

San Diego County

- Oceanside
- Vista
- Fallbrook

== Election results from statewide races ==
Year	Office	Results
2020	President	Biden 54.3 – 43.5%
2018	Governor	Newsom 51.6 – 48.4%
2018	Senator	Feinstein 55.4 – 44.6%
2016	President	Clinton 50.7 – 43.3%
2016	Senator	Harris 60.7 – 39.3%
2014	Governor	Kashkari 55.6 – 44.4%
2012	President	Romney 52.4 – 45.1%
2012	Senator	Emken 52.9 – 47.1%

== List of assembly members representing the district ==
Due to redistricting, the 74th district has been moved around different parts of the state. The current iteration resulted from the 2021 redistricting by the California Citizens Redistricting Commission.

Assembly members	Party	Years served	Counties represented	Notes
Alexander McLean	Republican	January 5, 1885 – January 3, 1887	Santa Barbara	
Russell Heath	Democratic	January 3, 1887 – January 7, 1889	Santa Barbara	
Charles A. Storke	Democratic	January 7, 1889 – January 5, 1891	Santa Barbara	
W. A. Hawley	Republican	January 5, 1891 – January 2, 1893	Santa Barbara	
Cornelius W. Pendleton	Republican	January 2, 1893 – January 4, 1897	Los Angeles	
L. H. Valentine	Republican	January 4, 1897 – January 1, 1901	Los Angeles	
Cornelius W. Pendleton	Republican	January 1, 1901 – January 2, 1903	Los Angeles	
Frederick W. Houser	Republican	January 2, 1903 – January 7, 1907	Los Angeles	
Robson O. Bell	Republican	January 7, 1907 – January 4, 1909	Los Angeles	
William J. Hanlon	Republican	January 4, 1909 – January 2, 1911	Los Angeles	
Charles Hiram Randall	Republican	January 2, 1911 – January 6, 1913	Los Angeles	
Frank H. Mouser	Republican	January 6, 1913 – January 6, 1919	Los Angeles	Ran as Progressive (Bull Moose) candidate during his run for 2nd and 3rd term.
Frank H. Mouser	Progressive	January 6, 1913 – January 6, 1919	Los Angeles	Ran as Progressive (Bull Moose) candidate during his run for 2nd and 3rd term.
Frederick Madison Roberts	Republican	January 6, 1919 – January 5, 1931	Los Angeles	First African American to serve in the legislator.
Archibald E. Brock	Republican	January 5, 1931 – January 2, 1933	San Bernardino	
James B. Utt	Republican	January 2, 1933 – January 4, 1937	Orange	
Clyde A. Watson	Democratic	January 4, 1937 – January 6, 1947	Orange	
Earl W. Stanley	Republican	January 6, 1947 – January 7, 1957	Orange	
Bruce Sumner	Republican	January 7, 1957 – January 7, 1963	Orange	
Gordon Cologne	Republican	January 7, 1963 – January 4, 1965	Riverside	
W. Craig Biddle	Republican	January 4, 1965 – June 15, 1972	Riverside	Resigned to be sworn in the 36th State Senate district after winning special election.
Vacant		June 15, 1972 – January 8, 1973	Riverside	
Walter M. Ingalls	Democratic	January 8, 1973 – November 30, 1974	Riverside	
Robert Badham	Republican	December 2, 1974 – November 30, 1976	Orange, San Diego	
Ronald Cordova	Democratic	December 6, 1976 – November 30, 1978	Orange, San Diego	
Marian Bergeson	Republican	December 4, 1978 – November 30, 1982	Orange, San Diego	
Robert C. Frazee	Republican	December 6, 1982 – November 30, 1994	Orange, San Diego	
Howard Kaloogian	Republican	December 5, 1994 – November 30, 2000	San Diego	
Mark Wyland	Republican	December 4, 2000 – November 30, 2006	San Diego	
Martin Garrick	Republican	December 4, 2006 – November 30, 2012	San Diego	
Allan Mansoor	Republican	December 3, 2012 – November 30, 2014	Orange	
Matthew Harper	Republican	December 1, 2014 – November 30, 2018	Orange	
Cottie Petrie-Norris	Democratic	December 3, 2018 – November 30, 2022	Orange	
Laurie Davies	Republican	December 5, 2022 – present	Orange, San Diego	

== Election results (1990–present) ==
=== 2024 ===
2024 California State Assembly 74th district election
Primary election
Party	Candidate	Votes	%
Republican	Laurie Davies (incumbent)	64,187	55.4
Democratic	Chris Duncan	51,731	44.6
Total votes		115,918	100.0
General election
Republican	Laurie Davies (incumbent)	117,208	50.8
Democratic	Chris Duncan	113,338	49.2
Total votes		230,546	100.0
Republican hold			

=== 2022 ===
2022 California State Assembly 74th district election
Primary election
Party	Candidate	Votes	%
Republican	Laurie Davies (incumbent)	60,568	53.9
Democratic	Chris Duncan	51,768	46.1
Total votes		112,336	100.0
General election
Republican	Laurie Davies (incumbent)	91,637	52.6
Democratic	Chris Duncan	82,466	47.4
Total votes		174,103	100.0
Republican gain from Democratic			

=== 2020 ===
2020 California State Assembly 74th district election
Primary election
Party	Candidate	Votes	%
Democratic	Cottie Petrie-Norris (incumbent)	76,081	52.3
Republican	Diane Dixon	36,683	25.2
Republican	Kelly Ernby	32,602	22.4
Total votes		145,366	100.0
General election
Democratic	Cottie Petrie-Norris (incumbent)	133,607	50.5
Republican	Diane Dixon	131,023	49.5
Total votes		264,630	100.0
Democratic hold			

=== 2018 ===
2018 California State Assembly 74th district election
Primary election
Party	Candidate	Votes	%
Republican	Matthew Harper (incumbent)	46,500	41.6
Democratic	Cottie Petrie-Norris	31,626	28.3
Democratic	Karina Onofre	13,536	12.1
Republican	Katherine Daigle	12,331	11.0
Democratic	Ryan Ta	7,827	7.0
Total votes		111,820	100.0
General election
Democratic	Cottie Petrie-Norris	105,699	52.7
Republican	Matthew Harper (incumbent)	94,947	47.3
Total votes		200,646	100.0
Democratic gain from Republican			

=== 2016 ===
2016 California State Assembly 74th district election
Primary election
Party	Candidate	Votes	%
Democratic	Karina Onofre	46,077	42.4
Republican	Matthew Harper (incumbent)	42,317	38.9
Republican	Katherine Daigle	20,258	18.6
Total votes		108,652	100.0
General election
Republican	Matthew Harper (incumbent)	114,477	56.2
Democratic	Karina Onofre	89,362	43.8
Total votes		203,839	100.0
Republican hold			

=== 2014 ===
2014 California State Assembly 74th district election
Primary election
Party	Candidate	Votes	%
Republican	Keith Curry	17,013	27.6
Republican	Matthew Harper	15,309	24.9
Democratic	Anila Ali	11,978	19.5
Democratic	Karina Onofre	9,310	15.1
Republican	Emanuel Patrascu	7,933	12.9
Total votes		61,543	100.0
General election
Republican	Matthew Harper	60,070	59.5
Republican	Keith Curry	40,896	40.5
Total votes		100,966	100.0
Republican hold			

=== 2012 ===
2012 California State Assembly 74th district election
Primary election
Party	Candidate	Votes	%
Republican	Allan Mansoor (incumbent)	33,319	43.5
Democratic	Robert Rush	25,120	32.8
Republican	Leslie Daigle	18,207	23.8
Total votes		76,646	100.0
General election
Republican	Allan Mansoor (incumbent)	110,190	56.6
Democratic	Robert Rush	84,520	43.4
Total votes		194,710	100.0
Republican hold			

=== 2010 ===
2010 California State Assembly 74th district election
Party	Candidate	Votes	%
Republican	Martin Garrick (incumbent)	81,661	55.5
Democratic	Crystal Crawford	56,033	38.1
Libertarian	Paul King	9,453	6.4
Total votes		147,147	100.0
Republican hold			

=== 2008 ===
2008 California State Assembly 74th district election
Party	Candidate	Votes	%
Republican	Martin Garrick (incumbent)	90,383	50.6
Democratic	Brett Maxfield	72,126	40.4
Libertarian	Paul King	16,166	9.0
Total votes		178,675	100.0
Republican hold			

=== 2006 ===
2006 California State Assembly 74th district election
Party	Candidate	Votes	%
Republican	Martin Garrick	72,980	58.0
Democratic	Roxana Folescu	52,747	42.0
Total votes		125,727	100.0
Republican hold			

=== 2004 ===
2004 California State Assembly 74th district election
Party	Candidate	Votes	%
Republican	Mark Wyland (incumbent)	99,348	57.5
Democratic	Karen R. Underwood	68,180	39.4
Libertarian	Paul King	5,372	3.1
Total votes		172,900	100.0
Republican hold			

=== 2002 ===
2002 California State Assembly 74th district election
Party	Candidate	Votes	%
Republican	Mark Wyland (incumbent)	66,276	61.0
Democratic	John Herrera	36,315	33.3
Libertarian	Kristi Stone	6,203	5.7
Total votes		108,794	100.0
Republican hold			

=== 2000 ===
2000 California State Assembly 74th district election
Party	Candidate	Votes	%
Republican	Mark Wyland	86,384	57.3
Democratic	John Herrera	51,213	34.0
Natural Law	Barbara Bourdette	7,242	4.8
Libertarian	Thomas M. Hohman	5,827	3.9
Total votes		150,666	100.0
Republican hold			

=== 1998 ===
1998 California State Assembly 74th district election
Party	Candidate	Votes	%
Republican	Howard Kaloogian (incumbent)	66,049	57.0
Democratic	William F. "Bill" Fitzgerald	44,809	38.6
Natural Law	Barbara Bourdette	2,707	2.3
Libertarian	Thomas M. Hohman	2,408	2.1
Total votes		115,973	100.0
Republican hold			

=== 1996 ===
1996 California State Assembly 74th district election
Party	Candidate	Votes	%
Republican	Howard Kaloogian (incumbent)	79,942	56.9
Independent	Fred L. Clayton	51,863	36.9
Libertarian	Douglas F. Webb	8,584	6.1
Total votes		140,389	100.0
Republican hold			

=== 1994 ===
1994 California State Assembly 74th district election
Party	Candidate	Votes	%
Republican	Howard Kaloogian	71,715	60.8
Democratic	Poppy Demarco Dennis	38,465	32.6
Libertarian	Daniel Muhe	5,054	4.3
Peace and Freedom	Claudio Ferrari	2,758	2.3
Total votes		117,992	100.0
Republican hold			

=== 1992 ===
1992 California State Assembly 74th district election
Party	Candidate	Votes	%
Republican	Robert C. Frazee (incumbent)	83,591	55.9
Democratic	Ken Lanzer	47,876	32.0
Libertarian	Mark Hunt	9,808	6.6
Peace and Freedom	Shirley Marcoux	8,350	5.6
Total votes		149,625	100.0
Republican hold			

=== 1990 ===
1990 California State Assembly 74th district election
Party	Candidate	Votes	%
Republican	Robert C. Frazee (incumbent)	69,856	57.0
Democratic	Jerry Franklin	38,386	31.3
Libertarian	Mark Hunt	9,539	7.8
Peace and Freedom	Mary Rico-Webber	4,865	4.0
Total votes		122,645	100.0
Republican hold			

== See also ==
- California State Assembly
- California State Assembly districts
- Districts in California
