= Mark Wyland =

Californian politician

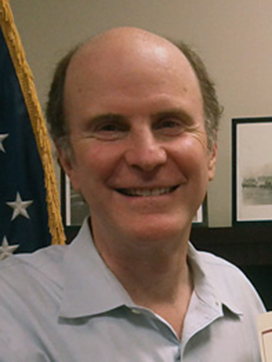
- Wyland in 2012

Member of the California State Senate from the 38th district
- In office December 4, 2006 – November 30, 2014
- Preceded by: Bill Morrow
- Succeeded by: Joel Anderson (redistricted)

Member of the California State Assembly from the 74th district
- In office December 4, 2000 – November 30, 2006
- Preceded by: Howard Kaloogian
- Succeeded by: Martin Garrick

Personal details
- Born: October 27, 1946 (age 79) Escondido, California
- Party: Republican
- Children: Nicole
- Education: Pomona College; Columbia University
- Occupation: Co-owner, Pine Tree Lumber Company
- Website: Senator Wyland

Mark Bryan Wyland (October 27, 1946) is a U.S. Republican politician from the state of California, who represented the 38th District in the California State Senate.

== Biography ==
Wyland grew up in the city of Escondido. As a Fulbright Scholar, he earned a B.A. in International Relations from Pomona College, where he is a current trustee, and an M.A. in political science from Columbia University. After briefly working for the city of New York, he returned to Escondido and worked at Pine Tree Lumber Company, his family’s lumber and building materials business, where he worked his way up and eventually became a co-owner.

Wyland began his first government service by sitting on the Escondido Union School District Board from 1997 to 2000. In 2000, he was elected to the California State Assembly to represent the 74th Assembly District. In 2006 he was elected to the 38th Senate District California State Senate. He was reelected to the California State Senate in November 2010.

Wyland served on the Governmental Organization, Transportation, Insurance, and Business and Professions Committees. He is the ranking Republican on the Labor and Industrial Relations Committee. He is also a member of the state's Little Hoover Commission, which makes recommendations on government reform proposals, and the State Allocation Board, which allocates and oversees bond funding for school construction.

California Assembly
Preceded by Howard Kaloogian	California State Assemblyman; 74th District; December 4, 2000 – December 4, 2006	Succeeded by Martin Garrick
California Senate
Preceded by Bill Morrow	California State Senator; 38th District; December 4, 2006 – November 30, 2014	Succeeded by Joel Anderson
