= Cottie Petrie-Norris =

American politician (born 1975)

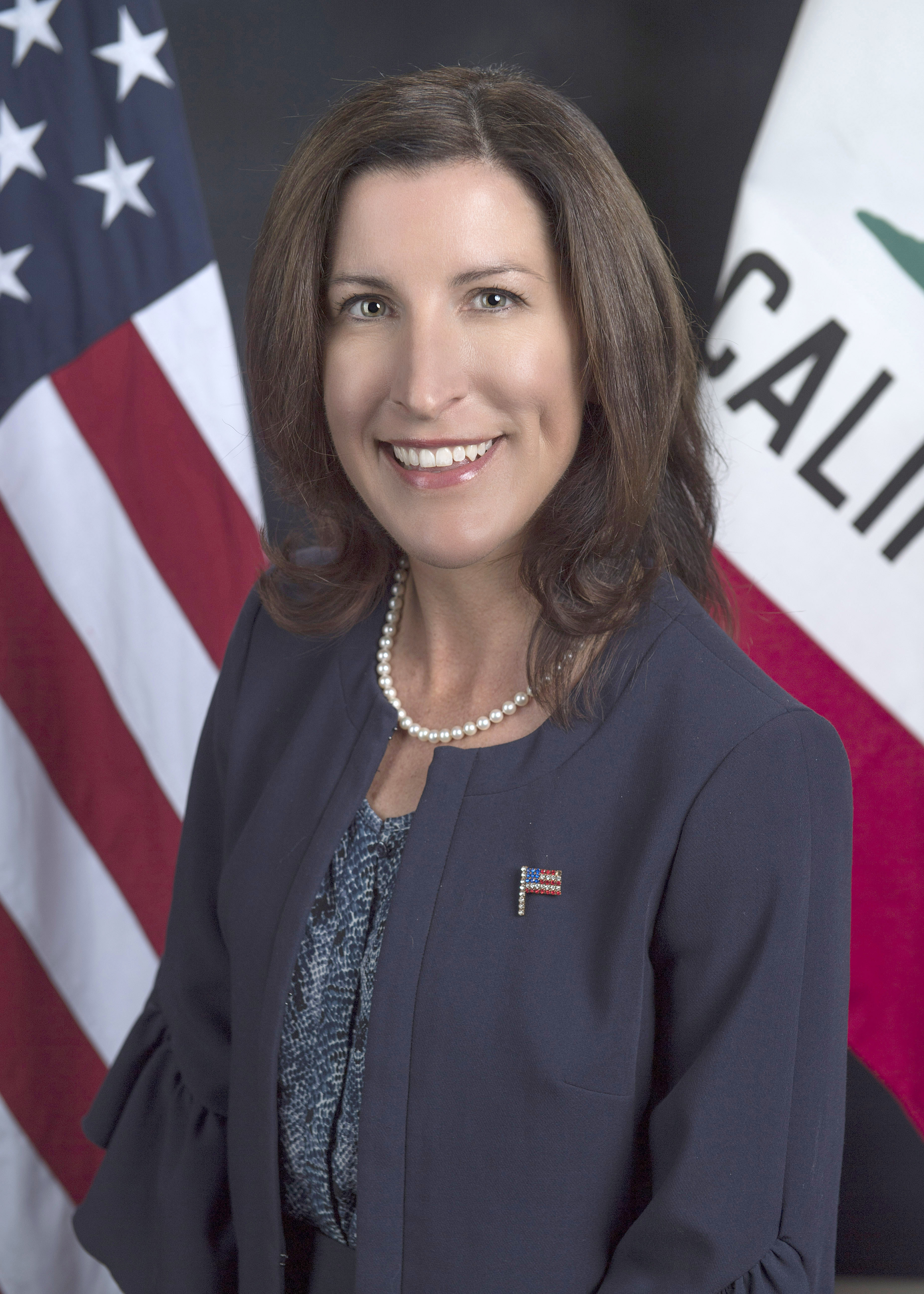

Member of the California State Assembly
- Incumbent
- Assumed office December 3, 2018
- Preceded by: Matthew Harper
- Constituency: 74th district (2018–2022); 73rd district (2022–present)

Personal details
- Born: August 7, 1975 (age 51) San Diego, California, U.S.
- Party: Democratic
- Spouse: Colin
- Children: 2
- Education: Yale University

Catherine Ann "Cottie" Petrie-Norris (born August 7, 1975) is an American politician who is in the California State Assembly. A Democrat, she represents the 73rd Assembly district, which encompasses the inland Orange County communities of Costa Mesa, Irvine, and Tustin. Prior to being elected, she was a small business owner and served on the Housing and Human Services Committee of Laguna Beach.

Petrie-Norris was first elected to the State Assembly in November 2018 to represent the 74th Assembly district after defeating the previous incumbent, Republican Matthew Harper. In 2020, Petrie-Norris was elected to a second term by a very narrow margin over Newport Beach Mayor Diane Dixon.

Following the re-districting process of 2021, Petrie-Norris moved to Irvine to seek re-election in the newly drawn 73rd Assembly district. She ran against incumbent Republican assembly member Steven Choi and ultimately defeated him in 2022. In 2024, she was reelected over former Newport Beach Councilman Scotty Peotter.

Petrie-Norris serves as Chair of the Utilities and Energy Committee of the State Assembly.

== Personal life ==
She is married to Colin Petrie-Norris.

== Electoral history ==
2018 California State Assembly 74th district election
Primary election
Party	Candidate	Votes	%
Republican	Matthew Harper (incumbent)	46,500	41.6
Democratic	Cottie Petrie-Norris	31,626	28.3
Democratic	Karina Onofre	13,536	12.1
Republican	Katherine Daigle	12,331	11.0
Democratic	Ryan Ta	7,827	7.0
Total votes		111,820	100.0
General election
Democratic	Cottie Petrie-Norris	105,699	52.7
Republican	Matthew Harper (incumbent)	94,947	47.3
Total votes		200,646	100.0
Democratic gain from Republican			

2020 California State Assembly 74th district election
Primary election
Party	Candidate	Votes	%
Democratic	Cottie Petrie-Norris (incumbent)	76,081	52.3
Republican	Diane Dixon	36,683	25.2
Republican	Kelly Ernby	32,602	22.4
Total votes		145,366	100.0
General election
Democratic	Cottie Petrie-Norris (incumbent)	133,607	50.5
Republican	Diane Dixon	131,023	49.5
Total votes		264,630	100.0
Democratic hold			

2022 California State Assembly 73rd district election
Primary election
Party	Candidate	Votes	%
Democratic	Cottie Petrie-Norris (incumbent)	44,890	56.2
Republican	Steven Choi (incumbent)	34,957	43.8
Total votes		79,847	100.0
General election
Democratic	Cottie Petrie-Norris (incumbent)	75,950	55.8
Republican	Steven Choi (incumbent)	60,212	44.2
Total votes		136,162	100.0
Democratic gain from Republican			

2024 California State Assembly 73rd district election
Primary election
Party	Candidate	Votes	%
Democratic	Cottie Petrie-Norris (incumbent)	45,950	56.1
Republican	Scotty Peotter	24,999	30.5
Republican	Hengameh Abraham	11,019	13.4
Total votes		81,968	100.0
General election
Democratic	Cottie Petrie-Norris (incumbent)	108,445	56.8
Republican	Scotty Peotter	82,365	43.2
Total votes		190,810	100.0
Democratic hold			
