= Matthew Harper =

American politician from California

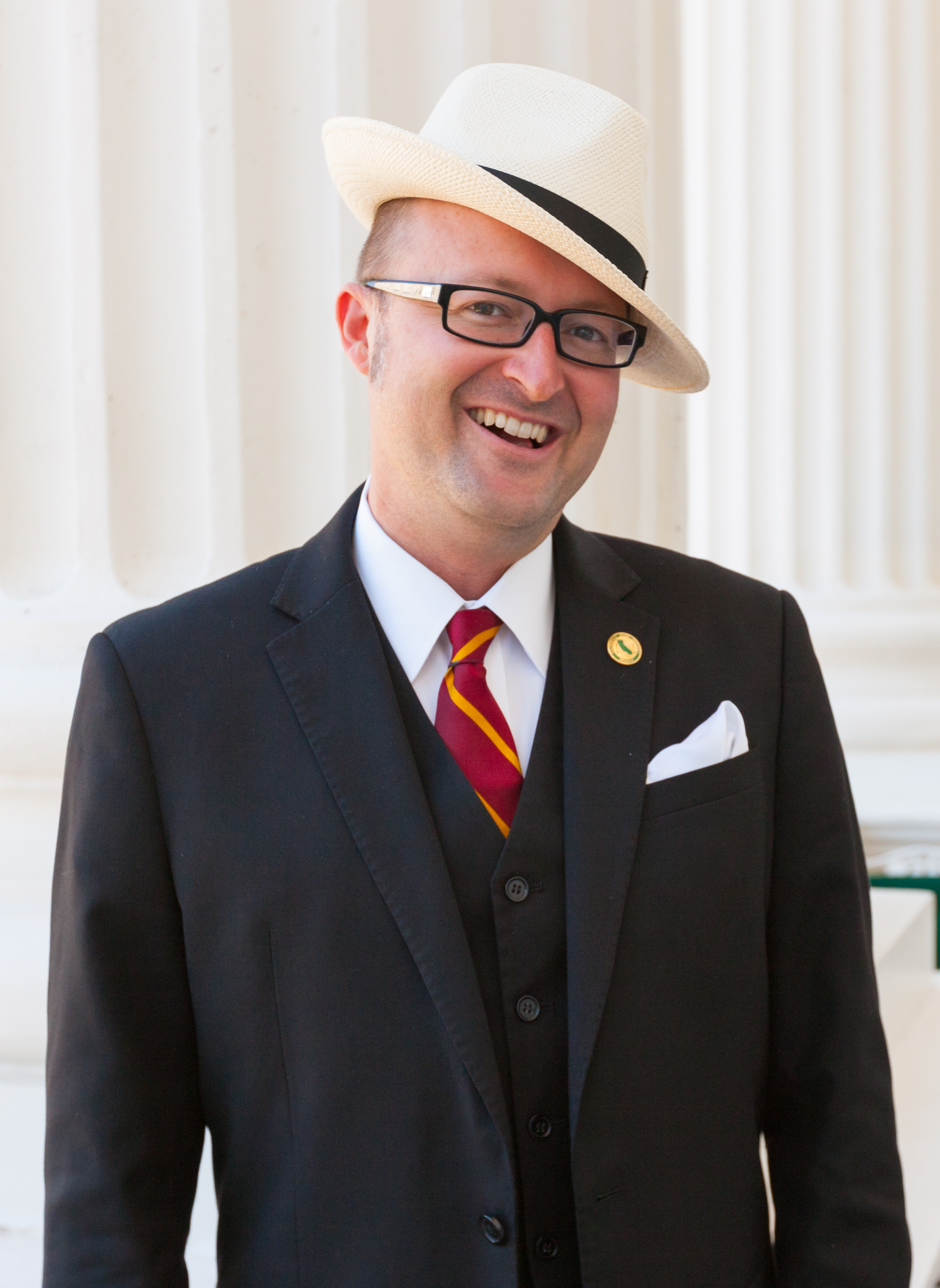

Member of the California State Assembly from the 74th district
- In office December 1, 2014 – November 30, 2018
- Preceded by: Allan Mansoor
- Succeeded by: Cottie Petrie-Norris

59th Mayor of Huntington Beach, California
- In office 2013–2014
- Preceded by: Donald F. Hansen
- Succeeded by: Jill Hardy

Personal details
- Born: Matthew Martin Harper; June 27, 1974 (age 52) Long Beach, California, U.S.
- Party: Republican
- Spouse: Elizabeth Byrne (m. 2014)
- Education: University of Southern California
- Occupation: Real estate broker, politician

Matthew Harper (June 27, 1974) served as the 59th Mayor of Huntington Beach, California (2013-2014). Harper was elected to three terms to the Huntington Beach Union High School District Board of Trustees (1998-2010), one term to the Huntington Beach City Council (2010-2014) and two terms to the California State Assembly (2014-2018).

== Early life ==
Harper was born in Long Beach, California, and lived briefly in Colorado, but grew up in Westminster and Huntington Beach. He is a graduate of Huntington Beach High School.

== Education ==
Harper attended Orange Coast College in Costa Mesa, California. Harper earned a Bachelor of Science degree in Public Policy and Management from USC in Los Angeles, California.

== Career ==
Harper was first elected to the Huntington Beach Union High School District (HBUHSD) in 1998, re-elected with the most votes in 2002, and named to an uncontested third term in 2006. There are five governing board members, or trustees, that are each elected at-large by HBUHSD voters. The HBUHSD serves the secondary education needs of the Orange County communities of Huntington Beach, most of Westminster, most of Fountain Valley, a portion of Garden Grove and all of unincorporated Midway City. Four separate feeder elementary school districts serve the primary education needs of the territory served by the HBUHSD. High schools in the district include: Huntington Beach High School, Westminster High School, Marina High School, Fountain Valley High School, Edison High School, Ocean View High School, Valley Vista High School, Coast High School, Community Day School, and Huntington Beach Adult School.

After completing his third term on the HBUHSD Board of Trustees, on November 2, 2010, Harper was elected to become a member of city council for Huntington Beach, California. Harper's campaign platform included public safety, infrastructure, economic development, administrative and fiscal accountability, property rights, personal freedom and opposition to higher taxes. In 2012, Harper was chosen by the mayors of the Second District to the Orange County Transportation Authority (OCTA) Board of Directors.

In 2013, Harper became the 59th Mayor of Huntington Beach, California, until 2014.

As Mayor, Harper worked to complete the Vans Skate Park, broke ground on a new senior center, and sought to repeal several laws, including the 1987 ban on state-approved fireworks. In his four years on the Huntington Beach City Council, Harper "built a reputation as conservative, pro-business and unafraid."

Matthew Harper subsequently served as member of the California State Assembly for District 74, encompassing the coastal Orange County communities of Huntington Beach, Costa Mesa, Newport Beach, Irvine, Laguna Woods, and Laguna Beach for two terms.

From 2007–2011, Harper served as a policy advisor and deputy chief of staff to then-Orange County Supervisor Janet Nguyen. In 2011, Harper served as an appointee to the five-member Orange County Redistricting Committee.

For two years, Harper was the elected Chairman for the Young Republican Federation of California (YRFC) and served on their state board for over ten years. Locally, Harper has been elected to several terms to the Orange County Republican Party Central Committee. Harper has served on the executive committee for the OCGOP. Statewide, Harper served as the elected Associate Representative to the California Republican Party. As Associate Representative, Harper was an ex-officio member of the state platform committee. In 2014, he was elected to the California State Assembly, defeating Newport Beach Mayor Keith Curry, a fellow Republican. He served two terms and was defeated in the 2018 General election by Democrat Cottie Petrie-Norris.

Matthew Harper continues as a delegate to the California Republican Party.

In 2020, Harper was a candidate for Huntington Beach city council and lost, placing 7th out of 15 candidates.

In 2022, Harper was a candidate for the California Board of Equalization and lost, placing 4th out of 7 candidates in the top two primary. In the 2022 General election, Harper was a candidate for the Huntington Beach Union High School District school board and lost, placing 4th out of 8 candidates.

== Election history ==
=== 2014 California State Assembly ===
California's 74th State Assembly district election, 2014
Primary election
Party	Candidate	Votes	%
Republican	Keith Curry	17,013	27.6
Republican	Matthew Harper	15,309	24.9
Democratic	Anila Ali	11,978	19.5
Democratic	Karina Onofre	9,310	15.1
Republican	Emanuel Patrascu	7,933	12.9
Total votes		61,543	100.0
General election
Republican	Matthew Harper	60,070	59.5
Republican	Keith Curry	40,896	40.5
Total votes		100,966	100.0
Republican hold			

=== 2016 California State Assembly ===
California's 74th State Assembly district election, 2016
Primary election
Party	Candidate	Votes	%
Democratic	Karina Onofre	46,077	42.4
Republican	Matthew Harper (incumbent)	42,317	38.9
Republican	Katherine Daigle	20,258	18.6
Total votes		108,652	100.0
General election
Republican	Matthew Harper (incumbent)	114,477	56.2
Democratic	Karina Onofre	89,362	43.8
Total votes		203,839	100.0
Republican hold			

=== 2018 California State Assembly ===
California's 74th State Assembly district election, 2018
Primary election
Party	Candidate	Votes	%
Republican	Matthew Harper (incumbent)	46,500	41.6
Democratic	Cottie Petrie-Norris	31,626	28.3
Democratic	Karina Onofre	13,536	12.1
Republican	Katherine Daigle	12,331	11.0
Democratic	Ryan Ta	7,827	7.0
Total votes		111,820	100.0
General election
Democratic	Cottie Petrie-Norris	105,699	52.7
Republican	Matthew Harper (incumbent)	94,947	47.3
Total votes		200,646	100.0
Democratic gain from Republican			

=== 2020 Huntington Beach City Council Election ===
2020 Huntington Beach City Council Election
Candidate	Votes	%
Tito Ortiz	42,246	14.83
Dan Kalmick	30,310	10.64
Natalie Moser	30,185	10.60
Gracy Van Der Mark	23,365	8.20
Oscar D. Rodriguez	21,696	7.62
Brian Burley	20,862	7.33
Matthew Harper	20,055	7.04
Casey McKeon	19,900	6.99
Jeff Morin	16,727	5.87
William Billy O'Connell	16,602	5.83
Sonya Green	11,560	4.06
Eric "Silk" Silkenson	10,388	3.65
John Briscoe	9,688	3.40
Thomas Matthew Laparne	8,497	2.98
Amory Hanson	2,699	0.95
Total votes	284,780	100.0

=== 2022 California Board of Equalization ===
California's 4th Board of Equalization district, 2022
Primary election
Party	Candidate	Votes	%
Democratic	Mike Schaefer (incumbent)	597,948	35.9
Democratic	David Dodson	249,971	15.0
Republican	Denis R. Bilodeau	236,625	14.2
Republican	Matthew Harper	183,330	11.0
Republican	Erik Peterson	180,278	10.8
Republican	Randell R. Economy	109,975	6.6
Republican	John F. Kelly	107,319	6.4
Total votes		1,665,446	100.0
General election
Democratic	Mike Schaefer (incumbent)	1,241,062	58.8
Democratic	David Dodson	867,945	41.2
Total votes		2,109,007	100.0
Democratic hold			

=== 2022 Huntington Beach Union High School District Election ===
2022 Huntington Beach Union High School District Election
Candidate	Votes	%
Duane Dishno	46,716	18.71
Bonnie Castrey	46,001	18.43
Diana Lee Carey	41,013	16.43
Matthew Harper	30,307	12.14
Angela Salinardi	26,968	10.80
Christine Hernandez	26,001	10.42
Saul Lankster	21,719	8.70
Scott Rogers	10,917	4.37
Total votes	249,642	100.0

=== 2026 California State Assembly ===
2026 California's 72nd State Assembly district election
Primary election
Party	Candidate	Votes	%
Democratic	Chris Kluwe	70,530	43.8
Republican	Gracy Van Der Mark	60,688	37.7
Republican	Matthew Harper	26,435	16.4
No party preference	Frank Wagoner	3,372	2.1
Total votes		161,025	100.0
General election
Democratic	Chris Kluwe		
Republican	Gracy Van Der Mark		
Total votes			

== Personal life ==
In 2014, Harper married Elizabeth Byrne. Harper and his family live in Huntington Beach, California.
