= Diane Harkey =

American politician (born 1951)

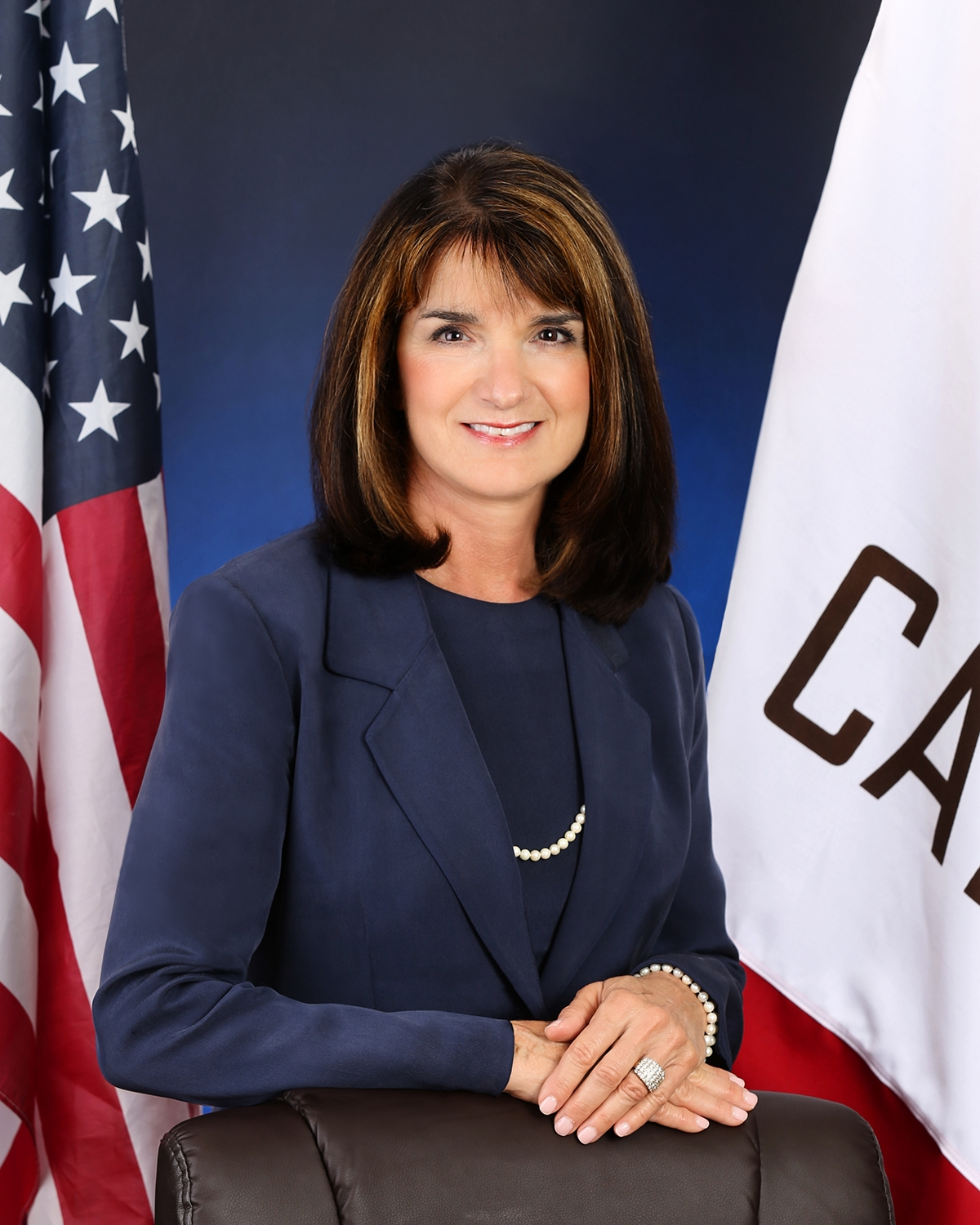
- Official portrait, 2014

Chair of the California State Board of Equalization
- In office February 23, 2017 – January 7, 2019
- Preceded by: Fiona Ma
- Succeeded by: Malia Cohen

Member of the California State Board of Equalization from the 4th district
- In office January 5, 2015 – January 7, 2019
- Preceded by: Michelle Steel
- Succeeded by: Mike Schaefer

Member of the California State Assembly from the 73rd district
- In office December 1, 2008 – December 1, 2014
- Preceded by: Mimi Walters
- Succeeded by: Bill Brough

Mayor of Dana Point
- In office December 13, 2006 – December 4, 2007
- Preceded by: Lara Anderson
- Succeeded by: Joel Bishop

Member of the Dana Point City Council
- In office December 8, 2004 – December 1, 2008
- Preceded by: William Ossenmacher
- Succeeded by: Scott Schoeffel

Personal details
- Born: June 20, 1951 (age 75) Joliet, Illinois, U.S.
- Party: Republican
- Spouse: Dan (m. 1983)
- Children: 1
- Education: University of California, Irvine (BA)
- Website: Government website

Diane Lynn Harkey (born June 20, 1951) is an American politician who served as a member of the California State Board of Equalization, representing its fourth district from 2015 to 2019. A member of the Republican Party, she was previously elected to the Dana Point City Council (2004–2008), including a stint as Mayor of Dana Point (2007–2008), as well as the California State Assembly (2008–2014). She was a Republican candidate for California's 49th congressional district seat in the 2018 election, losing to Democrat Mike Levin.

== Early years and education ==
Born in Joliet, Illinois, Harkey moved to California with her family as a young girl. Harkey graduated cum laude from the University of California, Irvine, with a Bachelor of Arts in economics.

== Banking career ==
Harkey has served as a vice-president in the banking industry and has had a 30-year career in corporate banking and finance.

== Political career ==
=== Dana Point ===
Harkey's involvement in politics began in 1989, when she actively campaigned for the incorporation of the City of Dana Point. Harkey has served as a board member of the Ocean Institute and Dana Point Fifth Marine Regiment Support Group, a trustee for the Capistrano Valley Symphony, and a member of the Chamber of Commerce. She served on the Dana Point City Council from 2004 to 2008, and during that period, in 2007, she served as the city's mayor.

=== California State Senate election, 2006 ===
In 2006, Harkey ran against then-Assemblyman Tom Harman for the 35th State Senate District in one of the closest California State Senate races in the state's history. Harman defeated Harkey for the Republican nomination by 225 votes or roughly 0.2% of the vote and went on to win the general election by 44,000 votes.

=== California State Assembly ===
In 2008, she ran as the Republican nominee for the 73rd State Assembly district against Democratic nominee Judy Jones. Harkey received the endorsements of the Republican Congressional delegation in the district, Assemblywoman Mimi Walters (who vacated the seat to run for state senate), former opponent State Senator Tom Harman, over 80 elected officials in Orange and San Diego Counties, and the Republican Assembly Women's Caucus. Harkey won the election with 53.4% of the vote, while Jones received 40.6% of the vote. She served in the Assembly from November 2008 to November 2014.

=== State Board of Equalization ===
In 2014, Harkey became term-limited in the State Assembly and ran for a seat on the California State Board of Equalization representing the 4th district, which encompasses Imperial, Orange, Riverside, and San Diego counties, as well as small portions of Los Angeles and San Bernardino counties. She came in second place in the June 3 nonpartisan blanket primary with 34.0% of the vote, and subsequently won the November general election by a margin of 61.6% to 38.4%. In 2017 she was selected by her colleagues on the board to serve as board chair.

She chose not to seek reelection in 2018, choosing instead to run for Congress to represent California's 49th congressional district. Her term on the board ended in January 2019.

=== Tenure ===
Harkey represents the communities of Aliso Viejo, Coto De Caza, Dana Point, Ladera Ranch, Laguna Hills, Laguna Niguel, Mission Viejo, Rancho Santa Margarita, California, San Clemente, San Juan Capistrano, and Trabuco Canyon.

Harkey has been an outspoken opponent of California High-Speed Rail, introducing several pieces of legislation to defund the project.

In 2017, the California Department of Finance audited the Board of Equalization and found a conference in Harkey's district had brought in 98 board employees to perform duties including "registration, parking lot duty, and break area facilitation". Harkey denied that she was involved in redirecting staff to these activities.

In 2017, a California State Personnel Board audit of the California State Board of Equalization recommended the dismissal of one of Harkey's aides. The audit found that the aide was allowed to work from the agency's New York office, and that Harkey's staff "used their positions of authority to improperly influence, and arguably pressure, BOE executives to ensure placement" of the aide to a permanent civil service position.

=== Committee membership ===
- Business Tax Committee – Chair
- Franchise Tax Board – Member
- Member of the State Assembly, she served as Vice Chair for the Assembly Committees on Revenue and Taxation and Appropriations.

== Political positions ==
=== Immigration ===
She would like to strengthen border security, and believes that California should pay more attention to that issue. She supports President Trump's desire to build a wall on the southern border of the United States.

=== Environment ===
Harkey supports taking care of the environment but has stated America is damaging its economy with unnecessary climate change laws. She believes America shouldn't be leading the global fight against climate change when other countries like India and China are releasing higher levels of greenhouse gases. She doesn't support the federal plan to increase offshore drilling in California by the Trump administration, and believes California should get an exemption like the one given to Florida.

=== Economic issues ===
Harkey supports the Trump administration's 2017 tax reform, especially as it affects employers, but has criticized how it got rid of state and local tax deductions for many California residents.

Harkey supports free trade and has found some of the Trump administration's trade pacts "frightening" but believes the issues will resolve themselves.

=== Gun policy ===
Harkey said she's not a supporter of gun control laws "because the bad guys will always have guns". She has stated that school shootings are actually the result of drugs and mental health issues, as well as children spending too much time with games and cell phones during their formative years. She has stated children should not have access to cell phones in schools, and that schools should be doing more to identify and address children with mental health issues. She has stated support for locking down schools and arming teachers with guns if they're comfortable with it, but believes that isn't a country-wide solution.

=== Healthcare ===
Harkey has stated that the Affordable Care Act has caused healthcare costs to rise in California. She has stated that Medicare is a failing program and does not support its expansion. She believes the federal government should be doing more to instill healthy habits in children and focus on improving healthcare technology to bring down healthcare costs. She has stated the NIH should be doing more to treat mental illness.

=== President Donald Trump ===
Harkey has been endorsed by Donald Trump and supports some of his policies, though has said he lacks "charisma" and his mannerisms are "not attractive", often making women uncomfortable. She wishes he would post on Twitter less often.

== Electoral history ==
2014 Election: 4th District B.O.E. Member
=== California State Board of Equalization, Member 4th District election, 2014 ===
		Votes						
Party	Candidate	Imperial	Orange	Riverside	San Bernardino	San Diego	District Total	%
Republican	Diane Harkey	9,539	389,404	203,475	58,978	369,184	1,030,580	61.4
Democratic	Nader Shahatit	10,771	198,570	129,383	51,272	258,984	648,980	38.6

2012 Election: District 73 State Assembly
=== California State Assembly District 73 election, 2012 ===
		Votes		
Party	Candidate	Orange	District Totals	%
Republican	Diane Harkey	130,030	130,030	64.3
Democratic	James Corbett	72,196	72,196	35.7

2010 Election: District 73 State Assembly
=== California State Assembly District 73 election, 2010 ===
		Votes			
Party	Candidate	Orange	San Diego	District Totals	%
Republican	Diane Harkey	56,784	24,380	91,164	62.0
Democratic	Judy Jones	30,359	19,487	49,846	38.0

2008 Election: District 73 State Assembly
=== California State Assembly District 73 election, 2008 ===
		Votes			
Party	Candidate	Orange	San Diego	District Totals	%
Republican	Diane Harkey	60,390	27,515	87,905	53.1
Democratic	Judy Jones	40,130	27,355	67,485	40.8
Libertarian	Andrew Favor	7,036	3,135	10,171	6.1

2006 Special Election: District 35 State Senate
California State Senate District 35 Republican primary special election, 2006 (Note: The rules of the special elections were that if a candidate received over 50% of the vote then the candidate wins outright. If no candidate receives over 50% of the vote, then the top vote-getter of each party advances to the next round. Hence, Harman and Caballero advanced to the next round, held June 6, 2006)
Party	Candidate	Votes	%
Republican	Tom Harman	37,840	38.76
Republican	Diane Harkey	37,604	38.52
Democrat	Larry Caballero	22,176	22.72

=== California U.S. House of Representatives 49th District election, 2018 ===
On June 5, 2018, in the California "jungle primary", Harkey advanced to the November 2018 general election for California's 49th congressional district, finishing with the most votes in a crowded primary field. She advanced to the general election alongside Democratic environmental activist Mike Levin of nearby San Juan Capistrano, assuring that this north San Diego County-based district would be represented by someone from the Orange County portion.

In May 2018, the Orange County Register endorsed Harkey for the U.S. House. In July, the Tea Party Express, America's largest tea party PAC, endorsed Harkey. In late August, President Donald Trump tweeted what the San Francisco Chronicle described as "a glowing endorsement" of Harkey.

Harkey was defeated in the November 2018 general election by Levin, who received 55% of the vote to Harkey's 45%.

=== Orange County Supervisor 5th district election, 2022 ===
In 2022 Harkey ran for the Orange County Board of Supervisors, 5th district. She was eliminated in the primary after coming in at 3rd place with 18.5% of the vote, behind Katrina Foley and Patricia Bates who ended up in first and second place respectively.

== Personal life ==
After the 2008 economic downturn, Diane’s husband, Dan Harkey and his company, were sued by investors for real-estate related losses. Initially, the litigation filed in 2009 included Diane Harkey, who was dismissed with prejudice in 2013 by the plaintiffs and the court of all erroneous charges during the course of a public Jury trial.
