= Bruce Nestande =

American politician (1938–2020)

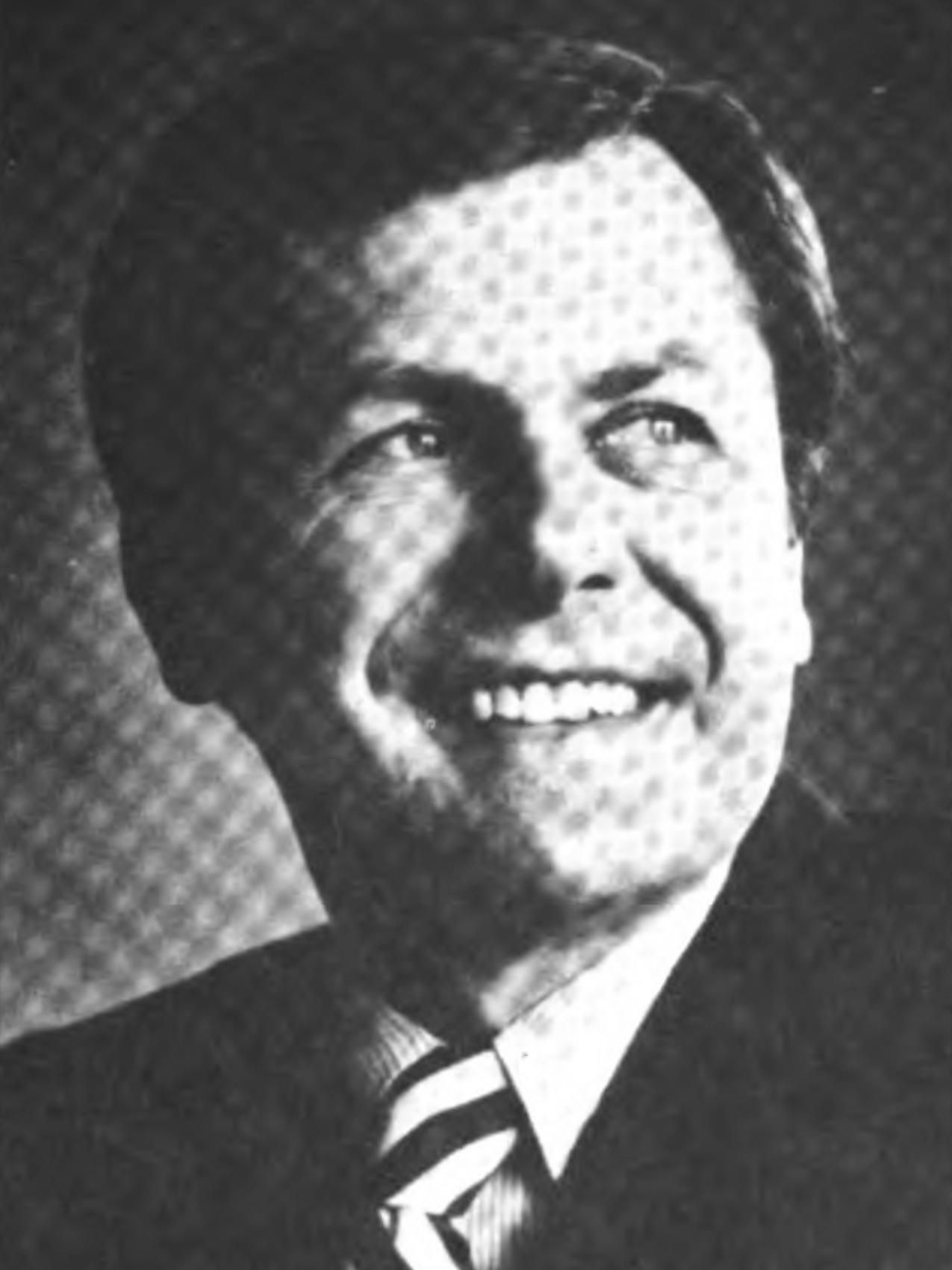
- Official portrait, 1975

Member of the California State Assembly from the 70th district
- In office December 2, 1974 – November 30, 1980
- Preceded by: Robert H. Burke
- Succeeded by: John Lewis

Personal details
- Born: January 28, 1938 Minneapolis, Minnesota, US
- Died: July 9, 2020 (aged 82)
- Spouse(s): Beverly Nestande (divorced); Pamela Nestande
- Children: 4 including: Brian Nestande
- Education: University of Minnesota; Lincoln Law School of Sacramento

Military service
- Branch/service: United States Marine Corps
- Rank: Captain
- Battles/wars: Vietnam War

Bruce Kenneth Nestande (January 28, 1938 – July 9, 2020) was an American politician who served as a Republican California State Assemblyman and Orange County Supervisor.

== Early life ==
Born in Minneapolis, Minnesota, Nestande was drafted by the Kansas City Athletics but opted to attend college on a Reserve Officers' Training Corps scholarship instead. He graduated from the University of Minnesota in 1960 with a Bachelor of Science in economics and political science, and later attended night law school to earn a J.D. from Lincoln Law School of Sacramento.

Upon graduating from the University of Minnesota, Nestande was commissioned as a second lieutenant in the United States Marine Corps in 1960. During his Marine service, he served four years on active duty, including fourteen months with an infantry battalion in Southeast Asia during the Vietnam War. He separated from the Marine Corps Reserve in 1972, having attained the rank of captain.

In 1966, Nestande became the inaugural director of the full-scale replica building of Independence Hall at Knott's Berry Farm in Buena Park, California.

== Political career ==
He was a special assistant to Governor Ronald Reagan from 1971–1972, State Field Director of Operations for the California Committee for the Re-Election of the President in 1972, and Executive Director of the California Republican Party from 1972–1973.

Nestande returned to Reagan's office in 1974 but left after less than a year when he was elected to the California State Assembly to represent the 70th District in Orange County. He quickly climbed in the legislative leadership, becoming Assembly Minority Whip in his second term, and then Minority Caucus Chairman (the second-ranking position in the Assembly Republican leadership) in his third term. During his three terms in the Assembly, he served as Chairman of the Human Resources Committee and the Select Committee on Veterans Affairs. He was also a member of the Criminal Justice, Housing and Community Development Committee; the Ways and Means Committee; and the Resources, Land Use and Energy Committee.

Rather than seeking a fourth Assembly term in 1980, Nestande successfully sought election to the Orange County Board of Supervisors, defeating incumbent Edison Miller. As a result of the 1980 campaign, Miller sued Nestande for defamation. Nestande won summary judgment against Miller, who appealed, but the California Fourth District Court of Appeal unanimously confirmed Nestande's victory.

Nestande won re-election to the Board of Supervisors in 1984. From 1984–1988, Nestande was a member of the Advisory Council on Historic Preservation. During his tenure on the Board of Supervisors, Nestande helped launch a number of transportation projects, including the Toll Roads of Orange County. He also helped push for the construction of Prado Dam in Riverside County.

In the November 1986 election, Nestande unsuccessfully challenged incumbent Secretary of State March Fong Eu and would resign from the Board of Supervisors less than three months later, in January 1987.

In 1994, he was campaign chairman for Michael Huffington's bid to unseat incumbent U.S. Senator Dianne Feinstein, which Huffington narrowly lost to Feinstein by 1.9%.

== Personal life ==
Nestande moved from Orange, California to nearby Newport Beach, after divorcing his long-time wife, Beverly. His older son, Barry, a former attache to the Congo, served the last eight years of his life as the Chief of Staff to John J. Benoit (during Benoit's tenure as State Assemblyman, State Senator, and Riverside County Supervisor) and was recognized as one of California's top political strategists. His younger son, Brian, a former Chief of Staff to Congressman Sonny Bono and Congresswoman Mary Bono and owner of the political consulting firm of Nestande & Associates, was elected to the Assembly in 2008 to succeed Benoit, who vacated his Assembly seat to enter the State Senate. Nestande's daughter-in-law, Gina (Brian's wife), was elected to the Palm Desert City Council in 2016 and became Mayor Pro tem in 2019 and Mayor in 2020 .

In 2007, Nestande pleaded guilty to misdemeanor DUI and hit and run charges as well as charges of filing a fraudulent insurance claim. The plea agreement was in exchange for prosecutors dropping felony charges. He was sentenced to 6 months in jail and three years probation.

California Assembly
Preceded by Robert H. Burke	California State Assemblyman; 70th District; December 2, 1974 – November 30, 1980	Succeeded by John Lewis
Political offices
Preceded by Edison Miller	Orange County Supervisor; 3rd District; 1981–1987	Succeeded by Gaddi Vasquez
