= Allan Mansoor =

American politician

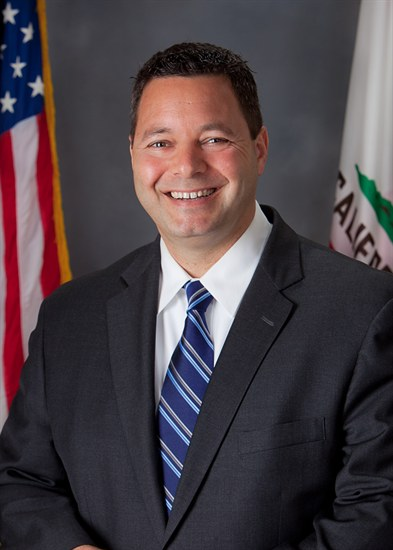

Member of the California State Assembly from the 74th district 68th district (2010–2012)
- In office December 6, 2010 – November 30, 2014
- Preceded by: Van Tran
- Succeeded by: Matthew Harper

Mayor of Costa Mesa
- In office January 3, 2005 – December 6, 2010
- Preceded by: Gary Monahan
- Succeeded by: Gary Monahan

Costa Mesa City Councillor
- In office December 2016 – December 1, 2020
- In office December 2, 2002 – December 6, 2010
- Succeeded by: Jim Righeimer

Personal details
- Born: Allan Roy Mansoor; June 16, 1964 (age 62) Redwood City, California
- Party: Republican
- Spouse: Janniffer Grubisich (m. 2013)
- Education: Coastline Community College
- Occupation: Deputy Sheriff

Allan Roy Mansoor (born June 16, 1964) is an American politician and former member of the California State Assembly. He is a Republican who represented the 74th district, encompassing a northwestern part of Orange County. Prior to being elected to the state assembly, he was the Mayor of Costa Mesa. In 2014, he sought election to the Orange County Board of Supervisors, but lost the election to state Board of Equalization member Michelle Park Steel.

Mansoor's father was an antiquities dealer and a member of the Coptic Orthodox Church from Egypt and his mother was originally from Åland.

== AllanMansoor.com domain lapse and subsequent trademark lawsuit ==
In February 2017, the OC Weekly reported that Mansoor's personal website had been purchased by a "John Doe" after Mansoor allowed the registration to expire. Mansoor's website was altered to a blog that reviewed pornographic websites with titles such as Backroom Facials and Ass Parade. Mansoor brought a lawsuit in federal court for trademark infringement against the anonymous purchaser of his domain.
