= Municipal Water District of Orange County =

Water supply agency

Coordinates: 33.6933°N 117.9449°W

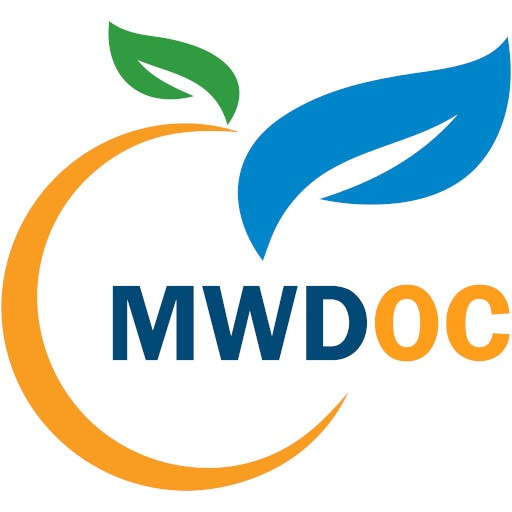

Special district overview
- Formed: 1951
- Headquarters: 18700 Ward Street, Fountain Valley, California
- Special district executive: Harvey De La Torre, General Manager
- Website: https://www.mwdoc.com/

The Municipal Water District of Orange County, commonly known by the acronym MWDOC, is a wholesale water provider, water resource development and planning agency, water-centric information, education, emergency planning, and conservation resource hub for Orange County. Local water supply sources meet only about half of the region's total water needs. To fulfill the remaining demand, MWDOC buys imported water from the California State Water Project in northern California and the Colorado River through the Metropolitan Water District of Southern California (Metropolitan). MWDOC delivers water to its 27 member agencies - made up of both water districts and city water departments - who then, in turn, provide retail water service to the public.

Metropolitan is the largest municipal water supplier in the United States and MWDOC is the third largest Metropolitan member agency.

== History ==
Indigenous peoples of California such as the Kizh (Gabrieleño), Acjachemen (Juaneño), and Payómkawichum (Luiseño) thrived on the land now known as Orange County territory for thousands of years. These tribes settled near available water sources such as lakes, rivers, and wetlands, working with seasonal weather cycles to meet their water needs. Colonization here began in 1769. In 1810, settlers made the first irrigation diversion of the Santa Ana River to supply missions, ranches, and towns. Gaspar de Portolá was the first Spanish military leader to explore Orange County and document the area.

By the mid 1800’s, the California Gold Rush had spurred a population surge, creating an even greater water demand. At this time, Orange County's growing communities relied primarily on surface water from the Santa Ana River. Deadly floods and long periods of drought severely impacted communities here. Soon, groundwater became a water supply for the area, and Orange County began to grow faster than ever before. With a large portion of Orange County now pulling water out of the ground, it became increasingly apparent that the underground basin could no longer support the area's water demands, and thriving cities desperately began searching for alternative sources of water. From 1928 to 1931, the Orange County cities of Anaheim, Fullerton, and Santa Ana joined ten other Southern California cities in the formation of Metropolitan. This union's initial aim was to transport water from the Colorado River, supplementing available water supply and ensuring against any water shortage in the future.

== Governance ==
MWDOC is a special district governed by a seven-member Board of Directors elected by the public for a four-year term. MWDOC's service area consists of seven divisions. MWDOC also appoints four representatives to the Metropolitan Board to advocate for Orange County's water interests.

Board Members
Division	Board Member	Term Began	Term Ends
1	Al Nederhood	2022	2026
2	Larry Dick	2022	2026
3	Robert McVicker	2024	2028
4	Karl Seckel	2024	2028
5	Randall Crane	2022	2026
6	Jeffery Thomas	2024	2028
7	Megan Yoo Schneider	2024	2028

== MWDOC's Service Area - Member Agencies and Director Divisions ==
MWDOC serves 27 member agencies:

1. City of Brea - (Division 1)
2. City of Buena Park - (Division 1)
3. City of Fountain Valley - (Division 3)
4. City of Garden Grove - (Division 2 and 3)
5. City of Huntington Beach - (Division 4)
6. City of La Habra - (Division 1)
7. City of La Palma - (Division 1)
8. City of Newport Beach - (Division 5)
9. City of Orange - (Division 2)
10. City of San Clemente - (Division 7)
11. City of Seal Beach - (Division 4)
12. City of Tustin - (Division 2 and 6)
13. City of Westminster - (Division 3)
14. East Orange County Water District - (Division 2)
  - The retail service area includes Panorama Heights and Crawford Canyon. The wholesale service area includes portions of Tustin, Orange, North Tustin, East Tustin, Red Hill, Lemon Heights, Cowan Heights, Orange Park Acres, and Panorama Heights.
15. El Toro Water District - (Division 5)
  - The service area includes Laguna Woods, Aliso Viejo, Laguna Hills, Lake Forest, and Mission Viejo.
16. Emerald Bay Service District - (Division 7)
  - The Service area includes the Emerald Bay community in Laguna Beach.
17. Golden State Water Company - (Divisions 1, 2, and 3)
  - The Service area includes portions of the cities of Placentia, Cypress, Los Alamitos, Stanton, Buena Park, Garden Grove, La Palma, Rossmoor, Seal Beach, Anaheim (not in MWDOC service area), Cowan Heights, Lemon Heights, Orange, Santa Ana (not in MWDOC service area), and Yorba Linda.
18. Irvine Ranch Water District - (Divisions 2, 5, and 6)
  - The service area includes portions of Orange, Tustin, Santa Ana (not in MWDOC service area), Costa Mesa, Newport Beach, Lake Forest, Silverado Canyon, Williams Canyon, Modjeska Canyon, Irvine, and some unincorporated areas of Orange County.
19. Laguna Beach County Water District - (Division 7)
  - The service area includes portions of Laguna Beach, Crystal Cove State Park, and the unincorporated community of Emerald Bay.
20. Mesa Water - (Division 4)
  - The service area includes the City of Costa Mesa and some unincorporated sections of Orange County, including the John Wayne Airport.
21. Moulton Niguel Water District - (Division 7)
  - The service area includes portions of Aliso Viejo, Laguna Niguel, Laguna Hills, Mission Viejo, and Dana Point.
22. Orange County Water District (OCWD) - (Divisions 1, 2, 3, 5, and 6)
  - OCWD is responsible for managing the region's groundwater basin.
23. Santa Margarita Water District - (Division 6)
  - The service area includes portions of Mission Viejo, Rancho Santa Margarita, Coto de Caza, Las Flores, Ladera Ranch, and Talega.
24. Serrano Water District - (Division 2)
  - The service area includes the City of Villa Park and portions of the City of Orange.
25. South Coast Water District - (Division 7)
  - The service area includes portions of Dana Point, South Laguna from Three Arch Bay to Nyes Place, and areas of northern San Clemente and San Juan Capistrano.
26. Trabuco Canyon Water District - (Division 6)
  - The service area includes Trabuco Canyon, Robinson Ranch, Trabuco Highlands, Walden, Rancho Cielo, Portola Hills, Santiago Canyon Estates, and Dove Canyon.
27. Yorba Linda Water District - (Division 1)
  - The service area includes most of the City of Yorba Linda, portions of Placentia, Brea, Anaheim (not in MWDOC service area), and unincorporated areas of Orange County.

== Orange County Water Sources ==
Orange County is a semi-arid region. While most of the state's precipitation falls in Northern California, most of the population lives in the lower part of the state. Southern California meets water supply needs with local water sources and imported water from hundreds of miles away. This water travels long distances through canals and pipelines and passing through reservoirs and water treatment plants along the way. The region's two primary sources of imported water come from the Colorado River and snowmelt from the Sierra Nevada Mountains through the California State Water Project – the most extensive state-built water delivery system in the United States, consisting of more than 700 miles of complex water infrastructure. The remaining water demand is met by a large underground aquifer located in the northern part of the county, recycled wastewater, and several small groundwater basins.

== Services and Support ==
The primary purpose of MWDOC is to provide a reliable supply of high-quality water for Orange County residents, businesses, and industry at an equitable and economical cost, both today and long into the future. To do this, MWDOC works closely with Metropolitan and its 27 member agencies, to identify, study, and evaluate opportunities to improve and secure Orange County’s overall water reliability.

In addition to providing water, sound representation, and planning and water resource development assistance, MWDOC also offers Orange County’s 3.2 million residents a wide-range of informational resources, water education programs for all ages, and consumer incentives on water-saving devices. Additionally, MWDOC administers the Water Emergency Response Organization of Orange County (WEROC). WEROC provides training, mutual aid planning assistance, and emergency response coordination for all Orange County water and wastewater agencies
