= Orange County Employees Association =

OCEA
- Orange County Employees Association
- Founded: 1937
- Headquarters: Santa Ana, California
- Location: United States
- Members: 18,000
- Key people: Lezlee Neebe, president
- Website: ocea.org

The Orange County Employees Association (OCEA), located in Santa Ana, California, is a public employee labor union in Orange County, representing about 18,000 employees. OCEA was founded in 1937.

== Represented Areas ==
Orange County Employees Association represents employees of Orange County, the Orange County Superior Court, cities, and special districts in the county.

=== County Agencies Represented ===
Assessor's Office; Auditor-Controller; Child Support Services; Clerk of the Board; Clerk-Recorder; County Counsel; County Executive Office; District Attorney's Office; Health Care Agency; Internal Audit; John Wayne Airport; OC Community Resources; OC Public Works; OC Waste & Recycling; OCERS; Public Defender; Registrar of Voters; Social Services Agency; Treasurer-Tax Collector.

=== Cities and Special Districts Represented ===
City of Anaheim; City of Costa Mesa; City of Fountain Valley; City of Fullerton; City of Garden Grove; City of Huntington Beach; City of Irvine; City of Laguna Niguel; Mesa Water District; Moulton Niguel Water District; City of Newport Beach; Orange County Fire Authority; Orange County Law Library; Orange County Sanitation District; Orange County Water District; City of Orange; City of Placentia; City of San Clemente; City of Santa Ana; Santa Margarita Water District; City of Seal Beach; South County Wastewater Authority; City of Yorba Linda.

== Leadership ==
OCEA is governed by a 19-member Board of Directors, elected by its membership. The Board determines the policies and general direction which guide OCEA and its staff. Each Board member is a member of OCEA. Lezlee Neebe is OCEA's current president of Orange County Superior Court.

=== General Managers ===
Charles Barfield

Jennifer (Muir) Beuthin, a former investigative reporter from the Orange County Register, now serves as OCEA's General Manager.

Nick Berardino was OCEA's third general manager. A machine gunner in the Marines during the Vietnam War, Berardino has been an OCEA employee since 1978. Berardino was hired in 2004 as the union's third general manager to lead the professional staff of OCEA. During his career at OCEA, Berardino has served in multiple positions for the union and in 2011 he was appointed to the 32nd District Agricultural Association, Orange County Fair Board by California Gov. Jerry Brown. In 2010 he was awarded the Cesar E. Chavez Award, which is given to the most outstanding labor leader. He was also named "The Best Voice for the Little Guy" in 2011 by OC Weekly.

Berardino is a controversial figure in Orange County politics and is known for his often belligerent approach to negotiations. During a contract negotiation session on January 5, 2014, Berardino became enraged at Orange County negotiator Bruce Barsook, called county supervisors "crooks", and yelled at him to leave the building. When Barsook got up to leave, Berardino stepped in front of him and chest-bumped Barsook. A few days later, the county filed formal assault charges against Berardino.

John Hagland Sawyer takes over as OCEA's general manager, after his father John Hiatt Sawyer retires in 1999. Before his tenure as general manager, John Sawyer Jr. served as OCEA's general counsel.

John Hiatt Sawyer was OCEA's first general manager. Sawyer, a graduate of the University of Michigan, joined OCEA in 1960 and turned it from a fraternal organization into the professional labor union it is today. During Sawyer's tenure at OCEA, the union negotiated health insurance for retired workers. The association was also among the first in the state to secure uniform retirement benefits for workers in the 1960s, instead of employees only getting what they paid into the system.

== Activities ==
=== City of Costa Mesa ===
OCEA represents employees in the city of Costa Mesa, which is part of the Costa Mesa City Employees Association. In March 2011, the Costa Mesa City Council distributed layoff notices to more than 200 employees. The Costa Mesa employees and OCEA filed an injunction blocking the City of Costa Mesa from laying off employees and privatizing their jobs. Orange County Superior Court Judge Tam Nomoto Schumann ruled in favor of the employees. The defeat is named "Best Political Coup-2011" by OC Weekly.

=== The People's Inauguration Party ===
In January 2011, OCEA served hot dogs to nearly 4,000 members of the public at the California State Capitol. The event, celebrating the inauguration of Governor Jerry Brown, was featured in various publications and media outlets.

=== Hybrid Pension Plan ===
OCEA and the County of Orange created a hybrid pension plan in 2009 that cleared the State legislature with unanimous bipartisan approval. Former vice chair of the Federal Reserve, Roger Ferguson, praised the pension plan for showing how to provide retirement security in a financially sustainable way.

=== Orange County Bankruptcy ===
On December 6, 1994, Orange County became the largest municipality in American history to ever file for bankruptcy. The Orange County Employees Association, which represented two-thirds of county employees at the time, challenged the resulting layoffs.

== See also ==
- Orange County Labor Federation
