= East Orange County Water District =

Local government special district in California, U.S.

Coordinates: 33.7893°N 117.8222°W

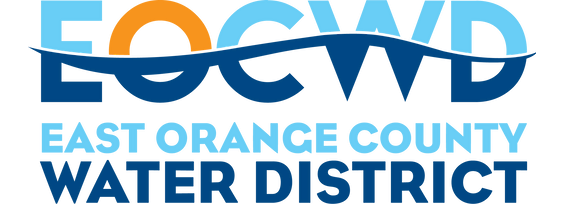

Special district overview
- Formed: 1961
- Headquarters: 185 North McPherson Road, Orange, California
- Special district executive: David Youngblood, General Manager
- Website: https://www.eocwd.com

The East Orange County Water District (EOCWD) is an independent special district that provides water distribution, sewer services, and wholesale water in portions of Tustin, Orange, and unincorporated Orange County, including North Tustin and Orange Park Acres.

== History ==
The district was founded in 1961 to assist local communities in the construction and operation of facilities to bring imported water from the Metropolitan Water District. This wholesale importation system currently serves Tustin, Orange, Golden State Water Company, Irvine Ranch Water District, and EOCWD's retail system. That retail system was originally a private water company that was later taken over by the County of Orange and currently owned and operated by EOCWD since 1985.

In 1994, the Orange County Grand Jury recommended consolidation of the district with other water districts in the county. A 1996 bill by Speaker of the Assembly Curt Pringle proposed merging the district with the city of Orange or the Irvine Ranch Water District. A study was conducted in 1999 to assess the existing condition of water service within their boundary, review the relationships between water providers, and identify organizational possibilities for further study. Various options for dissolution of the district and consolidation with other entities were considered, but none moved forward.

In 2016, EOCWD and the Irvine Ranch Water District submitted competing proposals to take over Area 7 of the Orange County Sanitation District. The Orange County LAFCO eventually decided to place the area under the control of EOCWD. The district had previously not provided sewer services.

== Governance ==
The East Orange County Water District is governed by a five-member Board of Directors, each elected to a four-year term by district. The current members of the Board are:

Board Member	Division	Term began	Term ends
John Sears	1	2024	2028
Marilyn Thoms	2	2022	2026
George Murdoch	3	2022	2026
Karin Marquez	4	2025	2026
Douglass Davert	5	2024	2028
