= Municipal elections in Costa Mesa, California =

Municipal elections in Costa Mesa are held every two years. Beginning in 1982, the elections were consolidated with the statewide general elections. From 1954 to 2016, voters could select as many candidates as open positions, meaning the total vote count could exceed voter registration numbers. Following the passage of Measure EE in 2016, Costa Mesa moved from a system of electing either two or three councilmembers at-large every two years, to a seven member city council with a directly elected mayor, with a two-year term, and six city councilmembers with four year terms.

== 1947 Incorporation Election ==
Incorporation Election
- October 7, 1947
- Shall the City of Costa Mesa be Incorporated?
- Outcome: Failed

Results
Choice	Votes	%
Yes	665	34.51%
No	1,262	65.49%

On March 25, 1947, a petition was presented to the Orange County Board of Supervisors to incorporate Costa Mesa as a city. Following a public hearing, an election was set to be held on October 7 to determine whether the city shall become incorporated and filling the offices of five city council members, one city clerk, and one city treasurer. As the incorporation vote failed, no officer was elected.

Costa Mesa City Council Election
Candidate	Votes	%
Heinz Kaiser	550	28.38
Nelson Morris Crawley	541	27.92
Walter Weimer	511	26.37
Ralph Irwin	490	25.28
Ellward Carr	485	25.03
Douglas Hinesly	406	20.95
Lloyd Schlosser	384	19.81
Arthur Yambert	354	18.27
Henry Vaughn	294	15.17
John Jeanes	293	15.12
Jay Soderlind	260	13.42
Harold Kyle	225	11.61
David Davidson	217	11.20
William Johnson	195	10.06
Gordon Maloche	148	7.64
Total votes	1,938	

Costa Mesa City Clerk Election
Candidate	Votes	%
Forrest Owen	716	63.20
Calla Viele	417	36.80
Total votes	1,133	

Costa Mesa City Treasurer Election
Candidate	Votes	%
Albert Dudek	960	100
Total votes	960	

== 1953 Incorporation Election ==
Incorporation Election
- June 16, 1953
- Shall the City of Costa Mesa be Incorporated?
- Outcome: Passed

Results
Choice	Votes	%
Yes	1,837	55.70%
No	1,461	44.30%

At a special election, held on June 16, Costa Mesans voted to incorporate as a general law city. The election also polled whether a city manager form of government should be used and who would be elected to the inaugural city council.

Form of Government Election
- June 16, 1953
- Shall the City of Costa Mesa have a City Manager Form of Government?
- Outcome: Passed

Results
Choice	Votes	%
Yes	1,502	68.93%
No	677	31.07%

Costa Mesa City Council Election
Candidate	Votes	%
Charles TeWinkle	1,637	49.64
Claire Nelson	1,178	35.72
Bertren Smith	1,060	32.14
Bruce Martin	909	27.56
Walter Miller	853	25.86
Arthur Meyers	743	22.53
Richard Irving Newman	725	21.98
Alma Swartz	712	21.59
William Johnson	578	17.53
Victor Caronna	567	17.19
Henry Crane	531	16.10
Robert Stevens	502	15.22
Forrest Paull	461	13.98
John Yates	407	12.34
Richard Sargent	241	7.31
write-ins	15	0.45
Total votes	3,298	

== 1954 Municipal Election ==
The 1954 municipal election, held on April 13, was Costa Mesa's first election as a city. The voters would elect all five Costa Mesa City Council members, with the top two vote-getters receiving a four year term, and the following three a two year term. The City Council also approved placing Proposition 1 on the ballot, which asked voters whether councilmembers should receive fifty dollars ($50) per month. There were 1,759 ballots cast.

Costa Mesa City Council Election
Candidate	Votes	%
Charles TeWinkle (incumbent)	1,356	77.1
Claire M. Nelson (incumbent)	1,298	76.8
Bertren Smith (incumbent)	1,264	73.8
Bruce Martin (incumbent)	1,237	73.2
Alvin Pinkley	1,107	70.3
Walter Miller (incumbent)	1,072	60.9
William Wiegand	767	45.4
Paul Dunlap	682	43.6
write-ins	9	0.5
Total votes	8,792	

=== 1954 Proposition 1 ===
Proposition 1
- April 13, 1954
- Shall councilmember compensation be permitted?
- Outcome: Passed

Results
Choice	Votes	%
Yes	1,102	65.21%
No	588	34.79%

There were 1,690 total votes in the Proposition 1 election. The measure passed and was adopted, allowing councilmember compensation.

== 1956 Municipal Election ==
The 1956 municipal election, held on April 10, was for three of the five members of the City Council. There were 2,087 ballots cast.

Costa Mesa City Council Election
Candidate	Votes	%
Alvin Pinkley (incumbent)	1,439	69.0
Bruce Martin (incumbent)	1,210	58.0
Bertren Smith (incumbent)	1,123	53.8
William Abbott, Sr.	493	23.6
Author Tuttle	482	23.1
Robert Mennes	425	20.4
Fred Wilson	331	15.9
J. D. Doverspike	267	12.8
Roy Windell	175	8.4
write-ins	3	-
Total votes	5,948	

== 1956 Annexation Election ==
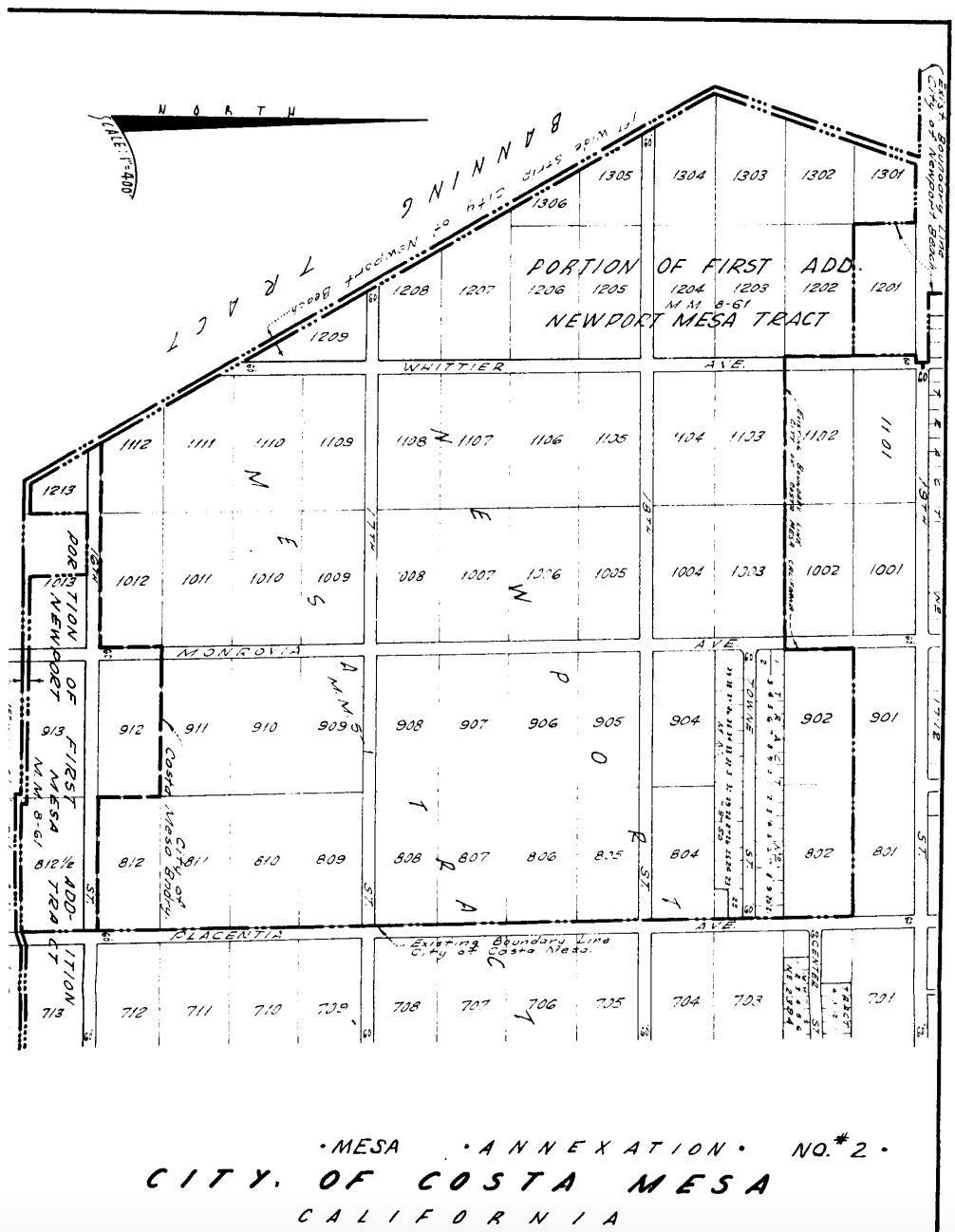
A map of the Mesa Annexation No. 2 area on Costa Mesa's Westside

On July 2, 1956, the City Council announced its intention to call for a special election on whether to annex a portion of land known as "Mesa Annexation No. 2." The election was held on October 11, 1956. Electors were those within the annexation area. There were 119 total votes, with 70 in favor and 49 against.

Mesa Annexation No. 2
- October 11, 1956
- Shall the area be annexed into the City of Costa Mesa?
- Outcome: Passed

Results
Choice	Votes	%
Yes	70	58.82%
No	49	41.18%

== 1957 Special Water Bond Election ==
Water Bond Election
- September 24, 1957
- Shall the City incur a Bond of $1.34 million?
- Outcome: Failed

Results
Choice	Votes	%
Yes	1,776	57.03%
No	1,338	42.97%

On September 24, 1957, the City held a special bond election to acquire and construct a water storage reservoir and other water-related infrastructure. Since the measure required a two-thirds vote to pass, it was declared to have failed.

As the territory of Mesa Annexation No. 2 had not been fully incorporated into the city at this point, the City Council also held a special public opinion poll within the zone. The result within the annexation area was 18 yes votes to 43 no votes.

== 1958 Municipal Election ==
Following the resignation of Charles TeWinkle in December 1955, Arthur Meyers was unanimously appointed to serve the remainder of his term. Meyers ran for reelection as an incumbent.

The 1958 municipal election, held on April 8, was to elect two members of the City Council. There were 2,517 ballots cast.

Costa Mesa City Council Election
Candidate	Votes	%
Everett Rea	1,437	57.1
Arthur Meyers (incumbent)	1,316	52.3
Walter Weimer	548	21.8
Frank Bissell	475	18.9
Fred Wilson	402	16.0
Leland Edwards	397	15.77
Glenn Crabaugh	222	8.8
scattered	3	-
Total votes	4,810	

== 1960 Municipal Election ==
Referendum on Ordinance 290
- April 12, 1960
- Shall the City Prohibit the Sale and Regulate the Use of Fireworks?
- Outcome: Failed

Results
Choice	Votes	%
Yes	1,651	32.82%
No	3,379	67.18%

Following the resignation of Councilmember Bruce Martin on July 1, 1957, John Smith was unanimously appointed to fill the unexpired term. Smith would go on to run for reelection.

Referendum on Ordinance 291
- April 12, 1960
- Shall the City Regulate and Control Oil Drilling?

Results
Choice	Votes	%
Yes	3,761	77.37%
No	1,100	22.63%

The 1960 municipal election, held on April 12, was to elect three members of the City Council and to vote on two referendums. The Newport Harbor Union High School District consolidated a bond election to build a new high school with the city's general election. Due to the number of issues on the ballot, the City Council adopted a resolution urging participation in the election. There were 5,081 ballots cast.

Costa Mesa City Council Election
Candidate	Votes	%
John Smith (incumbent)	3,304	65.0
Alvin Pinkley (incumbent)	3,187	62.7
Robert Wilson	1,608	31.6
Richard Stephens	1,520	29.9
Leonard Moody	979	19.3
Nick Mardesich	767	15.1
Robert Wigmore	755	14.9
Merwin Long	730	14.4
Earl Crouch	655	12.9
Donald Metcalf	638	12.6
Lee Penfold	364	7.2
Total votes	14,507	

== 1962 Municipal Election ==
The 1962 municipal election, held on April 10, was to elect two members of the City Council. There were 4,209 ballots cast.

Costa Mesa City Council Election
Candidate	Votes	%
Arthur Meyers (incumbent)	2,343	55.7
Joseph Tomchak	2,158	51.3
Jackson Hostetler	1,653	39.3
Selim (Bud) Franklin	1,414	33.6
Fannie Price	362	8.6
Joseph Andras	167	4.0
write-ins	4	0.1
Total votes	8,101	

== 1964 Municipal Election ==
The 1964 municipal election, held on April 14, was to elect three members of the City Council. The election was consolidated with that of the Costa Mesa Union School District. There were 7,860 ballots cast.

Costa Mesa City Council Election
Candidate	Votes	%
Alvin Pinkley (incumbent)	4,360	55.5
Robert Wilson (incumbent)	4,082	51.9
Calvin Barck	3,327	42.3
Tom Henry Doyle	2,472	31.5
Robert Heath	2,016	25.6
Samuel Duran	1,807	23.0
Rhea Dorn	1,313	16.7
Arthur Kitnick	1,087	13.8
Walter Baranger	697	8.9
Norman Wiley	695	8.8
Donald Hange	479	6.1
Total votes	22,335	

== 1966 Municipal Election ==
Following the resignation of councilmember Joseph Tomchak on August 5, 1963, the Council appointed Willard Jordan to fill the remainder of the term on August 19 of that year. Jordan would run for reelection as an incumbent.

The 1966 municipal election, held on April 12, was to elect two members of the City Council. There were 5,868 ballots cast.

Costa Mesa City Council Election
Candidate	Votes	%
Willard Jordan (incumbent)	4,180	71.2
George Tucker	3,226	55.0
Tom Henry Doyle	2,432	41.4
John Leonhardt	1,061	18.1
Theodore Bologh	191	3.3
Edwin Steckley	180	3.1
write-ins	3	0.1
Total votes	11,273	

== 1968 Municipal Election ==
The 1968 municipal election, held on April 9, was to elect three members of the City Council.

Costa Mesa City Council Election
Candidate	Votes	%
Alvin Pinkley (incumbent)	4,265	
Robert Wilson (incumbent)	4,168	
William St. Clair	3,515	
Calvin Barck (incumbent)	3,343	
Alan Schwalbe	1,321	
Terry Tuchman	1,266	
R. W. Cory	1,005	
Theodore Bologh	841	
Total votes	19,729	

== 1970 Annexation Election ==
On December 1, 1969, the City Council passed a resolution calling for a special election to annex a territory named "Back Bay No. 1 Annexation."

== 1970 Municipal Election ==
The 1970 municipal election, held on April 14, was to elect two members of the City Council.

Costa Mesa City Council Election
Candidate	Votes	%
Jack Hammett	5,780	
Willard Jordan (incumbent)	5,127	
George Tucker (incumbent)	2,663	
B. Eli Kaser	838	
David Yarnal	609	
Theodore Bologh	510	
Thomas Manus Jr.	371	
Total votes	15,898	

== 1971 Annexation Election ==
On November 16, 1970, the City Council passed a resolution calling for a special election to annex a territory called "Marina View Annexation."

== 1972 Municipal Election ==
The 1972 municipal election, held on April 11, was to elect three members of the City Council.

Costa Mesa City Council Election
Candidate	Votes	%
Robert Wilson (incumbent)	5,096	
Dom Raciti	4,935	
Alvin Pinkley (incumbent)	4,396	
William St. Clair (incumbent)	3,595	
Alfred Painter	3,205	
David Leighton	1,794	
Sam Ekovich	1,230	
Billie Golden	1,143	
Myra Kirschenbaum	981	
Mary Nolan	951	
Theodore Bologh	663	
Jeffrey Kane	619	
William Marsh	568	
Charlie Eifert	565	
James Agrusa	525	
G.E. McGuire	312	
Tom Manus	244	
Phillip Evans	239	
Darrell Neft	214	
Lewis Bowden	117	
Frederik Bos	92	
Total votes	31,484	

== 1973 Special Bond Election ==
Proposition A
- September 11, 1973
- Shall the $2.602 million dollar bond be approved?
- Outcome: Passed

Results
Choice	Votes	%
Yes	4,145	71.15%
No	1,681	28.85%

Proposition B
- September 11, 1973
- Shall the $1.308 million dollar bond be approved
- Outcome: Passed

Results
Choice	Votes	%
Yes	4,009	69.12%
No	1,791	30.88%

The 1973 special bond election, held on September 11, was for voters to decide whether to approve two bonds related to park improvements. Proposition A was a $2.602 million dollar bond for the acquisition of park sites and open space. Proposition B was a $1.308 million dollar bond for the construction of park improvements and public recreational facilities. Both propositions passed by the required two-thirds vote, with Proposition A gaining 4,145 out of 5,826 votes and Proposition B gaining 4,009 out of 5,800 votes.

== 1974 Municipal Election ==
The 1974 municipal election, held on March 5, was to elect two members of the City Council. Norma Hertzog was the first woman elected to the Costa Mesa City Council.

Costa Mesa City Council Election
Candidate	Votes	%
Jack Hammett (incumbent)	3,587	
Norma Hertzog	2,675	
Willard Jordan (incumbent)	2,500	
Joan Torribio	872	
Raymond Evans	625	
Richmond Westlake Jr.	577	
Total votes	10,836	

== 1976 Municipal Election ==
The 1976 municipal election, held on March 2, was to elect three members of the City Council. There were 8,407 ballots cast.

Costa Mesa City Council Election
Candidate	Votes	%
Dom Raciti (incumbent)	4,433	52.73
Mary Smallwood	4,197	49.92
Edward McFarland	2,765	32.89
Don Bull	2,170	25.81
Nathan Reade	1,972	23.46
Elvin Hutchison	1,879	22.35
Donn Hall	1,566	18.63
David Yarnal	961	11.43
Phillip Evans	845	10.05
Rose Morales	838	9.97
Ted Bologh	740	8.80
Alfred Jaskulski	579	6.89
Richmond Westlake Jr.	316	3.76
Vernon Phillips	179	2.13
Lewis Young	153	1.82
Michael Jon Olson	143	1.70
Joseph Schuval	88	1.05
Total votes	23,824	

== 1976 Special Referendum Election ==
Referendum on Ordinance 76-11
- November 2, 1976
- Shall Ordinance No. 76-11 be adopted?
- Outcome: Failed

Results
Choice	Votes	%
Yes	10,231	36.98%
No	17,437	63.02%

On March 1, the City Council passed Ordinance 76-11, which rezoned a parcel of land from single-family residential to commercial, by a 3-2 vote. A petition against the ordinance was signed by more than 10 percent of registered voters, causing a special election to be called. The referendum election was consolidated with the statewide general election that same year. The referendum failed and the ordinance was not adopted, receiving 10,231 votes in favor and 17,437 against.

== 1978 Municipal Election ==
The 1978 municipal election, held on March 7, was to elect two members of the City Council and to vote on one initiative placed on the ballot by petition. There were 8,355 ballots cast.

Costa Mesa City Council Election
Candidate	Votes	%
Norma Hertzog (incumbent)	3,644	43.61
Arlene Schafer	3,150	37.70
Don Bull	2,865	34.29
Christopher Magee Steel	1,684	20.16
K. Paul Raver	1,280	15.32
Thomas Keefer	968	11.59
G. Godfrey Sandeen	652	7.80
Darrilyn Oliver	517	6.19
Michael Ellis	413	4.94
Carl Merkle	375	4.49
Total votes	15,548	

=== 1978 Initiative Ordinance ===
1978 Initiative Ordinance
- March 7, 1978
- Shall the area be zoned single-family residential?
- Outcome: Passed

Results
Choice	Votes	%
Yes	4,295	52.40%
No	3,901	47.60%

The initiative was to zone all land bounded roughly by Bear Street, Sunflower Avenue, South Coast Drive, and Fairview Road as single-family residential. The initiative passed with 4,295 voting in favor and 3,901 against.

== 1980 Municipal Election ==
Following the death of Vice Mayor Smallwood on October 7, 1978, Planning Commission Chairman Donn Hall was unanimously appointed to fill the vacancy and was an incumbent in the 1980 election.

The 1980 municipal election, held on April 8, was to elect three members of the City Council. There were 6,758 ballots cast.

Costa Mesa City Council Election
Candidate	Votes	%
Donn Hall (incumbent)	3,781	55.95
Edward McFarland (incumbent)	3,153	46.66
Eric Johnson	2,664	39.42
Dick Carstensen	2,493	36.89
Christopher Steel	1,967	29.11
David Balsiger	1,949	28.84
Robert Graham	1,129	16.71
K. Paul Raver	954	14.12
Richard Johnston	819	12.12
Total votes	18,909	

== 1980 Measure J Election ==
Measure J
- June 3, 1980
- Shall rental housing developments for the specified groups be developed in Orange County?
- Outcome: Passed

Results
Choice	Votes	%
Yes	11,632	61.72%
No	7,214	38.28%

The Measure J Election, held on June 3, was an initiative to approve rental housing developments for elderly, handicapped, and low or moderate income persons. The election was held across unincorporated Orange County, with cities having the ability to opt-in by resolution, which Costa Mesa did by adoption Resolution 80-34. The election was consolidated with the Orange County primary election. The measure passed by a majority vote.

== 1982 Municipal Election ==
On November 16, 1981, the City Council approved Ordinance 81-22, which consolidated all future general municipal elections with the statewide general election. The 1982 municipal election, held on November 2, was to elect two members of the City Council. There were 28,359 ballots cast.

Costa Mesa City Council Election
Candidate	Votes	%
Arlene Schafer (incumbent)	13,947	49.18
Norma Hertzog (incumbent)	12,318	43.44
Christopher Steel	7,535	26.57
Dave Wheeler	5,993	21.13
Lynn Van Aken	4,279	15.09
Claudia Kelly-Weyer	2,552	9.00
Total votes	46,624	

== 1984 Municipal Election ==
The 1984 municipal election, held on November 6, was to elect three members of the City Council. There were 37,063 ballots cast.

Costa Mesa City Council Election
Candidate	Votes	%
Mary Hornbuckle	15,301	41.28
Dave Wheeler	13,487	36.39
Donn Hall (incumbent)	10,629	28.68
Douglas Yates	10,032	27.07
Eric Johnson (incumbent)	8,996	24.27
Charles Markel	8,287	22.36
Christopher Steel	7,483	20.19
Harry Green	5,618	15.16
Dom Raciti	3,980	10.74
Clarence Clarke	3,914	10.56
Sidney Soffer	1,985	5.36
Total votes	89,712	

== 1986 Municipal Election ==
The 1986 municipal election, held on November 4, was to elect two members of the City Council. There were 26,808 ballots cast.

Costa Mesa City Council Election
Candidate	Votes	%
Orville Amburgey	9,602	35.82
Peter Buffa	6,608	24.65
Sandra Hamilton	4,910	18.32
Joe Erickson	4,588	17.11
Doug Yates	3,953	14.75
Brian Theriot	3,690	13.76
Michael Nutter	3,612	13.47
Chris Steel	2,498	9.32
Bob Hanson	2,470	9.21
Char Johnson	2,049	7.64
Marie Maples	1,537	5.73
Michael Szkaradek	1,226	4.57
Nicholas Bartlett	571	2.13
Total votes	47,312	

== 1987 Measure C Election ==
Measure C
- November 3, 1987
- Shall the appropriations limit be increased?
- Outcome: Passed

Results
Choice	Votes	%
Yes	3,927	63.35%
No	2,272	36.65%

On August 3, the City Council called for a special election to increase the appropriations limit of the city, in accordance with the Constitution of California. The limit was proposed to be increased to provide funding for city streets, curbs, gutters, and sidewalks, and to construct new sidewalks for pedestrian safety. The election, held on November 3, had 6,264 ballots cast.

== 1988 Municipal Election ==
The 1988 municipal election, held on November 8, was to elect three members of the City Council and to vote on three measures. There were 36,717 ballots cast.

One large issue for the candidates was the growth of the city. There was a slate of three slow-growth candidates and members of Costa Mesa Citizens for Responsible Growth (Genis, Humphrey, and Williams) who supported Measure G and opposed Measures H and I. The six other remaining candidates had opposing views.

Howard Gensler withdrew from the race but still appeared on the ballot.

Costa Mesa City Council Election
Candidate	Votes	%
Sandra Genis	13,093	35.66
Ed Glasgow	12,532	34.13
Mary Hornbuckle (incumbent)	11,733	31.96
John Humphrey	11,381	31.00
Scott Williams	10,632	28.96
Jim Ferryman	8,520	23.20
Dan Worthington	7,955	21.67
Jan Kausen	5,750	15.66
Charles Markel	5,549	15.11
Howard Gensler	2,477	6.75
Total votes	89,622	

=== 1988 Measure G Election ===
Measure G
- November 8, 1988
- Outcome: Passed

Results
Choice	Votes	%
Yes	16,029	50.16%
No	15,929	49.84%

Measure G was an initiative ordinance and amendment to the General Plan. Titled the "Citizens' Sensible Growth and Traffic Control Initiative," it would require that certain levels of road and flood control facilities and certain levels of police, fire, and paramedic services be in place in order to permit specific types of development projects. Due to issues with ballot petition circulation, there were concerns with whether the measure could be placed on the ballot.

The measure passed.

=== 1988 Measure H and Measure I Election ===
Measure H
- November 8, 1988
- Outcome: Failed

Results
Choice	Votes	%
Yes	11,758	36.92%
No	20,091	63.08%

Measure I
- November 8, 1988
- Outcome: Failed

Results
Choice	Votes	%
Yes	12,718	40.00%
No	19,075	60.00%

The Segerstrom Home Ranch site is a parcel of land located between Harbor Boulevard, Sunflower Avenue, Fairview Road, and the 405 freeway. Following a court ruling in Costa Mesa Residents for Responsible Growth v. City of Costa Mesa, the city was required to amend two elements of its general plan, which was previously amended to allow for increased development at the Home Ranch property. The city first passed Resolution 88-11 in response to the case, which would allow 3.1 million square feet of development and certain building limit heights. A petition drive then began to circulate to place the issue on the ballot, ultimately becoming Measure H. In response, the city adopted an alternate resolution, Resolution 88-44, which would allow for less development, at 2.12 million square feet. Another petition was started to place this new resolution on the ballot, becoming Measure I. Passage of either measure would have allowed the development to be built. If both measures had passed, Measure H would have prevailed over Measure I.

Both measures failed and a large portion of the site remains vacant to this day.

== 1990 Municipal Election ==
The 1990 municipal election, held on November 6, was to elect two members of the City Council and to vote on two measures. There were 26,046 ballots cast.

Following controversial actions by the City Council, led by Councilmember Amburgey, a number of social issues were placed in the campaign spotlight. Namely, anti-illegal immigrant actions taken by the council and the censoring of public art that would receive grant funding. With Peter Buffa being seen as a swing vote on these issues, an anti-Amburgey slate was formed by Jay Humphrey and Karen McGlinn, with Arlene Schafer seen as an ally of Amburgey.

Costa Mesa City Council Election
Candidate	Votes	%
Peter Buffa (incumbent)	10,537	40.46
Jay Humphrey	9,149	35.13
Karen McGlinn	9,002	34.56
Orville Amburgey (incumbent)	6,419	24.64
Arlene Schafer	6,115	23.48
Total votes	41,222	

=== 1990 Measure V Election ===
Measure V
- November 6, 1990
- Outcome: Passed

Results
Choice	Votes	%
Yes	17,038	75.14%
No	5,638	24.86%

Measure V was a ballot measure by the City Council regarding campaign financing and conflicts of interest. Title the "Ethics in Costa Mesa Government Initiative," the ordinance would prohibit a councilmember from voting on projects involving any contributor of more than $500 to the council member’s campaign funds. The measure was seen as a response to incumbent councilmember Amburgey's lack of an abstention vote following projects by campaign contributors being brought before the council.

The measure passed.

=== 1990 Measure W Election ===
Measure W
- November 6, 1990
- Outcome: Failed

Results
Choice	Votes	%
Yes	11,925	49.68%
No	12,081	50.32%

Following an "unusually high number of complaints from residents," the City Council placed an advisory measure on the ballot to inform the Council on whether fireworks should be made illegal. Fireworks sold within the city would have to be "State Safety Approved" and must be sold by nonprofit community groups. A yes vote would be in favor of continuing to permit fireworks sales. The measure failed, but, as an advisory measure, no action was needed.

== 1992 Municipal Election ==
Councilmember Ed Glasgow resigned on June 15, 1991 after allegations of spying on city officials. At the June 17, 1991 meeting, the appointment of a councilmember was continued. At the July 1, 1991 meeting, eight candidates were nominated and seconded. The eight nominees were ranked by the four remaining councilmembers and the top four nominees then had a straw vote taken on whether they should be appointed, each vote failing 2-2. The issue was continued to the following meeting. At the July 15 meeting, votes were taken on three of the four nominees, each of which failed 2-2. Joe Erickson, the final of the four nominees, was then unanimously appointed by the Council to fill the unexpired term. Erickson would run for reelection as an incumbent.

The 1992 municipal election, held on November 3, was to elect three members of the City Council. There were 39,306 ballots cast.

Costa Mesa City Council Election
Candidate	Votes	%
Sandra Genis (incumbent)	12,128	30.86
Joe Erickson (incumbent)	10,835	27.57
Mary Hornbuckle (incumbent)	10,834	27.56
Brian Theriot	10,118	25.74
Chris Steel	8,478	21.57
Gary Monahan	7,914	20.13
Denis Retoske	7,845	19.96
Karen McKenna-Juergens	7,052	17.94
Donald Williams	4,928	12.54
Kevin Austin	3,227	8.21
Stephen McGuire	2,701	6.87
Total votes	86,060	

== 1994 Municipal Election ==
The 1994 municipal election, held on November 8, was to elect two members of the City Council. There were 28,887 ballots cast.

Costa Mesa City Council Election
Candidate	Votes	%
Peter Buffa (incumbent)	8,274	28.64
Gary Monahan	8,092	28.01
Libby Cowan	6,073	21.02
Chris Steel	5,570	19.28
Mark Korando	3,903	13.51
Mike Scheafer	3,249	11.25
Janet Lee McCammon	2,806	9.71
James Wysopal	1,716	5.94
Lynn David Clements	1,435	4.97
Michael Collier	1,270	4.40
Bob Brady	593	2.05
write-ins	3	0.01
Total votes	42,984	

== 1996 Municipal Election ==
The 1996 municipal election, held on November 5, was to elect three members of the City Council and to vote on one ballot measure. There were 32,572 ballots cast.

Casey Evans withdrew from the race but remained on the ballot.

Costa Mesa City Council Election
Candidate	Votes	%
Joe Erickson (incumbent)	13,422	41.21
Heather Somers	10,414	31.97
Libby Cowan	10,212	31.35
Chris Steel	8,809	27.04
Lawrence Jones	6,968	21.39
Mel Fleener	5,790	17.78
Caroline Butler	5,472	16.80
Robert Graham	4,399	13.51
Casey Evans	3,630	11.14
James Fisler	3,150	9.67
Total votes	72,266	

=== 1996 Measure F Election ===
Measure F
- November 5, 1996
- Outcome: Passed

Results
Choice	Votes	%
Yes	22,537	79.49%
No	5,816	20.51%

Measure F was a ballot measure proposed by the City Council which would institute term limits on city councilmembers. City councilmembers would be limited to two consecutive four-year terms. The measure passed.

== 1998 Municipal Election ==
The 1998 municipal election, held on November 3, was to elect two members of the City Council. There were 25,148 ballots cast.

Costa Mesa City Council Election
Candidate	Votes	%
Linda Dixon	9,711	38.62
Gary Monahan (incumbent)	8,920	35.47
Chris Steel	6,853	27.25
Caroline Butler	4,983	19.81
Lawrence Jones	2,797	11.12
James Fisler	2,396	9.53
Total votes		

== 2000 Municipal Election ==
The 2000 municipal election, held on November 7, was to elect three members of the City Council and vote on one ballot measure. There were 34,429 ballots cast.

The final results were not certified until November 28, with the lead of the third place candidate narrowing from 100 votes the morning after the election, to 36 votes a week after, to the final certified margin of 32 votes ahead.

Costa Mesa City Council Election
Candidate	Votes	%
Chris Steel	10,664	30.97
Libby Cowan (incumbent)	10,276	29.85
Karen Robinson	9,224	26.79
Heather Somers (incumbent)	9,192	26.70
Joel Faris	7,844	22.78
Dan Worthington	6,695	19.45
Rick Rodgers	6,539	18.99
Thomas Sutro	5,331	15.48
Ronald Channels	3,364	9.77
Michael Clifford	2,915	8.47
William Perkins	1,845	5.36
Total votes	73,889	

=== 2000 Measure O Election ===
Measure O
- November 7, 2000
- Outcome: Passed

Results
Choice	Votes	%
Yes	12,933	52.49%
No	11,708	47.51%

Measure O was a ballot measure submitted to the voters by the Costa Mesa City Council to implement a transient occupancy tax of no more than 2% which would be charged to hotel guests. Funds from the tax would go towards park and recreation facilities.

== 2002 Municipal Election ==
The 2002 municipal election, held on November 5, was to elect two members of the City Council. There were 22,494 ballots cast.

Costa Mesa City Council Election
Candidate	Votes	%
Gary Monahan (incumbent)	10,739	47.74
Allan Mansoor	7,617	33.86
Linda Dixon (incumbent)	7,092	31.53
Katrina Foley	5,690	25.30
William Perkins	3,520	15.65
Total votes		

== 2004 Municipal Election ==
On April 15, 2003, Mayor Karen Robinson resigned from her position as councilmember. Before her resignation was effective, at the April 7, 2003 meeting, she and Councilmember Cowan supported a motion to appoint the runner-up from the 2002 election, or if they were not willing or able, the second runner-up, and so on. That motion failed and an application process was adopted. At the April 21, 2003 meeting, nine people were nominated and seconded for appointment. The council conducted a straw vote, with four candidates losing 2-2 and five losing 1-3. The council then conducted a second straw vote, after which it would eliminate any nominee not receiving at least two votes; six nominees remained after the second straw poll. The council then further narrowed the nominees by selecting one nominee per councilmember, leaving four. Two more votes were taken on the four nominees, with no nominee receiving a majority vote. The council then ranked the four remaining candidates and eliminated the lowest ranked, and repeated the process with the three remaining candidates. The two remaining candidates, Eric Bever and Mike Scheafer, were voted on and failed to be appointed on 2-2 votes. The process was continued to the following meeting. At the May 5, 2003 council meeting, the two nominees were voted on again and failed 2-2. Following renominations of previously failed nominees and a suggestion to leave the seat vacant until a special election in November 2003, the matter was continued to a special meeting. At a special City Council meeting on May 12, 2003, Bever and Scheafer went before the council to answer questions related to Fairview Park and a bridge on 19th Street over the Santa Ana River. Following another set of failed motions to select either of the nominees and a proposal to hold a special election, Bever withdrew his nomination and Scheafer was appointed by a 3-1 vote to the unexpired term. Scheafer would run for reelection and would go on to lose against Bever.

The 2004 municipal election, held on November 2, was to elect three members of the City Council. There were 39,192 ballots cast.

Costa Mesa City Council Election
Candidate	Votes	%
Katrina Foley	13,298	33.93
Linda Dixon	12,599	32.15
Eric Bever	10,139	25.87
Bruce Garlich	10,095	25.76
Mike Scheafer (incumbent)	9,545	24.35
Chris Steel (incumbent)	6,680	17.04
Mirna Burciaga	5,797	14.79
Sam Clark	4,210	10.74
Richard Carroll	4,061	10.36
Karl Ahlf	3,316	8.46
Terry Shaw	2,936	7.49
Michael Clifford	1,540	3.93
Total votes	84,216	

== 2006 Municipal Election ==
The 2006 Municipal Election, held on November 7, was to elect two members of the City Council. There were 24,847 ballots cast.

There were two competing slates in the election, with Allan Mansoor and Wendy Leece on one slate, and Bruce Garlich and former councilmember Mike Scheafer on another.

Costa Mesa City Council Election
Candidate	Votes	%
Allan Mansoor (incumbent)	10,122	40.74
Wendy Leece	9,524	38.33
Bruce Garlich	8,280	33.32
Mike Scheafer	7,255	29.20
Mirna Burciaga	2,717	10.93
Chris Bunyan	1,190	4.79
Total votes	39,088	

== 2008 Municipal Election ==
The 2008 municipal election, held on November 4, was to elect three members of the City Council. There were 40,008 ballots cast.

Costa Mesa City Council Election
Candidate	Votes	%
Gary Monahan	17,836	44.58
Katrina Foley (incumbent)	15,912	39.77
Eric Bever (incumbent)	14,857	37.14
Jim Righeimer	13,000	32.49
Lisa Reedy	7,306	18.26
Chris McEvoy	6,828	17.07
William Sneen	4,088	10.22
Christopher Bunyan	3,037	7.59
Nick Moss	1,967	4.92
Total votes	84,831	

== 2010 Measure C Election ==
Measure C
- June 8, 2010
- Outcome: Passed

Results
Choice	Votes	%
Yes	13,000	87.67%
No	1,829	12.33%

The Measure C election, held on June 8, was consolidated with the statewide primary election. Measure C was a ballot measure submitted to the voters by the City Council regarding the OC Fair & Event Center. Following a large deficit in the California budget, the state legislature approved the sale of the fairgrounds in July 2009. The city council then amended its general plan land use designation for the site to ensure that the OC Fair would remain as an annual event if sold to a private developer. The measure would require that any future changes to the land use of the fairgrounds be approved by a majority vote at a future election.

The measure passed, with no ballot statement having been filed in opposition to the measure and many local officials predicting overwhelming support.

The city had also made a $96 million offer to purchase the fairgrounds, which was opposed by some state lawmakers after the city passed an anti-immigrant "Rule of Law" resolution. The OC Fairgrounds remain state property, formally organized as the 32nd District Agricultural Association.

== 2010 Municipal Election ==
The 2010 municipal election, held on November 2, was to elect two members of the City Council and vote on one ballot measure. There were 29,816 ballots cast.

Costa Mesa City Council Election
Candidate	Votes	%
Jim Righeimer	12,997	43.59
Wendy Leece (incumbent)	11,572	38.81
Chris McEvoy	10,846	36.38
Sue Lester	3,881	13.02
Chad Petschl	1,721	5.77
Total votes	41,017	

=== 2010 Measure L Election ===
Measure L
- November 2, 2010
- Outcome: Passed

Results
Choice	Votes	%
Yes	14,227	52.16%
No	13,048	47.84%

Measure L was a ballot measure submitted to the voters by the City Council which would increase the Transient Occupancy Tax charges to hotel guests from six percent to eight percent.

== 2012 Municipal Election ==
After Katrina Foley was elected to the Newport-Mesa Unified School District Board, she resigned from her position on the City Council effective December 31, 2010. At the January 4, 2011 Council meeting, Stephen Mensinger was appointed, by a 3-1 vote, to replace her. Mensinger would run for reelection as an incumbent.

The 2012 municipal election, held on November 6, was to elect three members of the City Council and one ballot measure. There were 39,008 ballots cast.

Costa Mesa City Council Election
Candidate	Votes	%
Sandra Genis	15,982	40.97
Steve Mensinger (incumbent)	14,199	36.40
Gary Monahan (incumbent)	13,945	35.75
John Stephens	13,790	35.35
Colin McCarthy	13,450	34.48
Harold Weitzberg	11,697	29.99
Al Melone	3,658	9.38
James Rader	2,449	6.28
Total votes	89,170	

=== 2012 Measure V Election ===
Measure V
- November 6, 2012
- Outcome: Failed

Results
Choice	Votes	%
Yes	13,806	40.21%
No	20,529	59.79%

In March 2011, the city sent out layoff notices to more than half of city employees, intending to outsource the work to private companies. The action prompted a lawsuit from the Orange County Employees Association (OCEA), which argued that Costa Mesa, as a general law city, was not empowered to outsource employees as a charter city would be able to. The court ruled in favor of the OCEA, prompting the council to explore adopting a city charter.

By a 4-1 vote on March 6, 2012, the council approved placing the issue of a city charter on the June 5 primary ballot. The paperwork to place the measure on the June ballot was filed past the deadline and so could not be placed on the June ballot. The city, through the city clerk, filed a lawsuit to allow for the measure to be placed on the June ballot, which was opposed by former councilmember Katrina Foley and council candidate John Stephens. The lawsuit was rejected and the measure was placed on the November ballot.

The measure was defeated, with large labor opposition.

== 2014 Municipal Election ==
The 2014 municipal election, held on November 4, was to elect two members of the City Council and to vote on two ballot measures. There were 20,827 ballots cast.

Costa Mesa City Council Election
Candidate	Votes	%
Katrina Foley	9,346	44.87
Jim Righeimer (incumbent)	7,524	36.13
Jay Humphrey	7,477	35.90
Lee Ramos	5,305	25.47
Tony Capitelli	1,856	8.91
Al Melone	1,470	7.06
Rita Louise Simpson	1,200	5.76
Christopher Scott Bunyan	1,108	5.32
Total votes	35,286	

=== 2014 Measure O Election ===
Measure O
- November 4, 2014
- Outcome: Failed

Results
Choice	Votes	%
Yes	6,994	36.66%
No	12,084	63.34%

Following the rejection of Measure V in 2012, a citizen advisory committee was created in May 2013 by the Council to explore the possibility of a future charter. The charter committee, following 10 months of debate, approved a proposed charter to be sent to the City Council. The Council then approved, on a 3-2 vote, to place the charter on the ballot. The measure failed to pass and Costa Mesa remains a general law city.

=== 2014 Measure P Election ===
Measure P
- November 4, 2014
- Outcome: Passed

Results
Choice	Votes	%
Yes	10,558	54.52%
No	8,806	45.48%

Measure P was an advisory measure placed by the City Council on whether toll lanes should be built on the 405 Freeway. Specifically, the measure asked "Do you agree with the Costa Mesa City Council, which unanimously opposes the establishment of toll lanes on the I-405 Freeway in Orange County?" The measure was criticized for having conflicting ballot title and ballot question language, with the ballot title being "Advisory measure, should toll lanes be built on the I-405 Freeway?” The measure passed, but, as an advisory measure, had no legal effect. In December 2023, toll lanes were opened on the freeway.

== 2016 Municipal Election ==
The 2016 municipal election, held on November 8, was to elect three members of the City Council and to vote on eight ballot measures. There were 43,721 ballots cast.

Costa Mesa City Council Election
Candidate	Votes	%
Sandra Genis (incumbent)	18,091	41.38
John Stephens	17,869	40.87
Allan Mansoor	15,187	34.74
Steve Mensinger (incumbent)	14,660	33.53
Jay Humphrey	14,470	33.10
Lee Ramos	10,334	23.64
Al Melone	4,923	11.26
Total votes	95,534	

=== 2016 Measures V, W, and X election ===
Measure V
- November 8, 2016
- Outcome: Failed

Results
Choice	Votes	%
Yes	14,937	37.81%
No	24,565	62.19%

Measure W
- November 8, 2016
- Outcome: Failed

Results
Choice	Votes	%
Yes	16,501	42.10%
No	22,695	57.90%

Measure X
- November 8, 2016
- Outcome: Passed

Results
Choice	Votes	%
Yes	21,470	54.61%
No	17,845	45.39%

Measures V, W, and X were three ballot measures related to the sale of medical marijuana in the city. Measure V would allow up to eight medical marijuana businesses, Measure W four, and Measure X would only allow non-retail businesses to open in an industrial area north of South Coast Drive and west of Harbor Boulevard. Measures V and W were proposed by petition, with Measure X being submitted to the voters by the City Council. Whichever of the three measures received the highest number of votes would be the one that became law.

Measure X ultimately gained the support of the proponents of the other two measures. Measures V and W failed, while Measure X passed.

=== 2016 Measure Y and Measure Z Election ===
Measure Y
- November 8, 2016
- Outcome: Passed

Results
Choice	Votes	%
Yes	26,132	68.39%
No	12,081	31.61%

Measure Z
- November 8, 2016
- Outcome: Passed, Not Adopted

Results
Choice	Votes	%
Yes	20,506	55.78%
No	16,258	44.22%

Measures Y and Z were two ballot measures related to development in Costa Mesa. Measure Y, placed on the ballot by petition, would require voter approval for development projects that require amending the Costa Mesa General Plan and that add 40 or more dwelling units or 10,000 square feet of other non-residential space, among other requirements. Measure Z, a competing measure submitted by the City Council, would ratify the existing land use regulations and establish a new park fee on development. As competing measures, whichever gained the most votes would become law.

Measures Y and Z both received more than 50% of the vote, but as Measure Y received more votes, it became law.

Measure Y was partially overturned by Measure K in 2022.

=== 2016 Measure AA and Measure BB Election ===
Measure AA
- November 8, 2016
- Outcome: Passed

Results
Choice	Votes	%
Yes	27,098	70.85%
No	11,149	29.15%

Measure BB
- November 8, 2016
- Outcome: Failed

Results
Choice	Votes	%
Yes	17,591	46.44%
No	20,289	53.56%

Measures AA and BB were two ballot measures related to Fairview Park in Costa Mesa. Measure AA, placed on the ballot by petition, would require voter approval for the building of new permanent structures and the extension of park hours, among other requirements. Measure BB, a competing measure placed on the ballot by the City Council, would prohibit the development of athletic fields at Fairview Park unless approved by a vote of the people, while still allowing for other limited park development. As competing measures, whichever gained the most votes would become law.

Measure AA passed and Measure BB failed.

=== 2016 Measure EE Election ===
Measure EE
- November 8, 2016
- Outcome: Passed

Results
Choice	Votes	%
Yes	23,295	65.09%
No	12,495	34.91%

To avoid a lawsuit from attorney Kevin Shenkman, who claimed the at-large council election system was discriminatory against Hispanic residents, the City Council placed Measure EE on the ballot. The measure would divide the city into six council districts, which would elect councilmembers to a four-year term, provide for a directly elected mayor with a two-year term, and would limit each office to a two-term limit. A different option rejected by the Council would have split the city into five council districts without an elected mayor.

Measure EE passed, transitioning the city to district-based elections.

=== 2016 Measure TT Election ===
Measure TT
- November 8, 2016
- Outcome: Passed

Results
Choice	Votes	%
Yes	21,545	54.68%
No	17,855	45.32%

Measure TT was not a ballot measure for the city of Costa Mesa, but rather one regarding the Mesa Water District and Costa Mesa Sanitary District, both of whose service areas encompassed most of the city. Proposed by the Mesa Water District, Measure TT was an advisory measure regarding whether the two special districts should consolidate into one. The two districts were on opposing sides, with the Mesa Water District in favor of the measure and the Costa Mesa Sanitary District opposed. The Costa Mesa City Council passed a resolution in support of the measure.

The measure passed, but as an advisory vote, no legal action was taken and the two special districts remain distinct entities.

== 2018 Municipal Election ==
Following approval of Measure EE in the 2016 election, councilmembers were elected by district and the mayor was directly elected. The 2018 election started the transition to district elections by electing members for the third, fourth, and fifth districts. The councilmembers elected in 2016, Sandra Genis, John Stephens, and Allan Mansoor, would continue to serve until 2020 in an at-large capacity. The election was held on November 6.

=== 2018 Mayoral Election ===
Early on November 8, 2017, the Costa Mesa City Council voted 3-2 to remove Katrina Foley as mayor and appoint Sandra Genis, who was mayor pro tem, as mayor. The decision was met with much controversy, with 49 public commenters attending the meeting and vows to remember this action in the 2018 mayoral election.

Incumbent mayor Sandra Genis, who was also mayor from 1992 to 1994, was defeated by councilmember Katrina Foley. Foley became the city's first directly elected mayor.

Genis continued to serve on the city council until 2020.

Costa Mesa Mayoral Election
Candidate	Votes	%
Katrina Foley	20,568	59.47
Sandra Genis (incumbent)	14,018	40.53
Total votes	34,586	

=== 2018 District 3 Election ===
Costa Mesa District 3 Election
Candidate	Votes	%
Andrea Marr	3,109	57.04
Brett Eckles	2,342	42.96
Total votes	5,451	

=== 2018 District 4 Election ===
Costa Mesa District 4 Election
Candidate	Votes	%
Manuel Chavez	1,603	60.63
Michelle Figueredo-Wilson	709	26.82
Steve Chan	332	12.56
Total votes	2,644	

=== 2018 District 5 Election ===
Councilmember Allan Mansoor ran in the District 5 election, though still had two years left in his term. He was defeated by Arlis Reynolds but remained on the council until 2020.

Costa Mesa District 5 Election
Candidate	Votes	%
Arlis Reynolds	3,168	56.45
Allan Mansoor (incumbent)	1,748	31.15
Rebecca Trahan	696	12.40
Total votes	5,612	

== 2020 Municipal Election ==
The 2020 election completed the transition process to district elections, with all councilmembers having been elected by district. The election was held on November 3, with an election for mayor, councilmembers for district 1, 2, and 6, and on one ballot measure.

=== 2020 Mayoral Election ===
Costa Mesa Mayoral Election
Candidate	Votes	%
Katrina Foley (incumbent)	25,833	47.73
Sandra Genis	11,158	20.62
Wendy Leece	5,751	10.63
Quentin Pullen	5,161	9.54
Al Melone	1,564	2.89
Total votes	54,122	

=== 2020 District 1 Election ===
Councilmember John Stephens, after having been elected at-large in the 2016 election, ran in the 2020 District 1 election. He was defeated by challenger Don Harper.

Costa Mesa District 1 Election
Candidate	Votes	%
Don Harper	4,437	38.77
John Stephens (incumbent)	4,114	35.95
Jason Komala	1,640	14.33
Total votes	11,444	

=== 2020 District 2 Election ===
Costa Mesa District 2 Election
Candidate	Votes	%
Loren Gameros	3,962	42.77
Ben Chapman	2,436	26.30
Gary Parkin	1,629	17.58
Total votes	9,264	

=== 2020 District 6 Election ===
Costa Mesa District 6 Election
Candidate	Votes	%
Jeffrey Harlan	4,612	40.84
Jeff Pettis	1,997	17.68
Hengameh Abraham	1,910	16.91
Lee Ramos	1,314	11.64
Total votes	11,293	

=== 2020 Measure Q Election ===
Measure Q
- November 3, 2020
- Outcome: Passed

Results
Choice	Votes	%
Yes	33,291	65.17%
No	17,793	34.83%

Following the passage of Measure X in 2016, the operation of retail cannabis businesses was illegal in Costa Mesa. The City Council placed Measure X on the ballot to authorize the adoption of an ordinance which would allow retail cannabis businesses and allow for a tax on cannabis.

The measure passed and the first legal cannabis store opened two years later.

== 2022 Municipal Election ==
Following the 2020 census, the city was required the redraw its district borders that were adopted four years previous. The new district map was adopted on March 15, 2022.

The election was held on November 8. Three councilmembers, the office of mayor, and one ballot measure were on the ballot. This was the first election since 1992 where each incumbent was reelected, and the first since 1982 where all the reelected incumbents were previously elected rather than appointed.

=== 2022 Mayoral Election ===
Following the election of Katrina Foley to the Orange County Board of Supervisors in March 2021, the City Council appointed former city councilmember John Stephens as mayor. Stephens would then run for reelection as an incumbent.

Costa Mesa Mayoral Election
Candidate	Votes	%
John Stephens (incumbent)	17,297	49.94
John Moorlach	14,336	41.39
Total votes	34,639	

=== 2022 District 3 Election ===
Costa Mesa District 3 Election
Candidate	Votes	%
Andrea Marr (incumbent)	2,220	44.3
John Thomas Patton	2,142	37.2
Jorge Miron	651	11.3
Total votes	5,749	

=== 2022 District 4 Election ===
Costa Mesa District 4 Election
Candidate	Votes	%
Manuel Chavez (incumbent)	1,881	75.5
Total votes	2,493	

=== 2022 District 5 Election ===
Costa Mesa District 5 Election
Candidate	Votes	%
Arlis Reynolds (incumbent)	3,175	56.0
Robert Dickson	1,784	31.5
Total votes	5,665	

=== 2022 Measure K Election ===
Measure K
- November 8, 2022
- Outcome: Passed

Results
Choice	Votes	%
Yes	16,483	50.03%
No	16,461	49.97%

Measure K, placed on the ballot by the City Council, was a measure to respond to the strict development limits enacted by Measure Y in 2016. The measure would, along certain commercial corridors in the city, remove the requirement for voter approval for developments enacted by Measure Y. The measure passed by 22 votes.

== 2024 Municipal Election ==
Although municipal elections in Costa Mesa are nonpartisan, two slates formed along party lines, with the Democratic endorsed slate of John Stephens, Adam Ereth, Loren Gameros, and Jeffrey Harlan opposing the Republican endorsed slate of James Peters, Mike Buley, and Jeff Pettis.

The 2024 municipal election took place on November 5, 2024. The mayor, and councilmembers for districts 1, 2, and 6 were on the ballot.

=== 2024 Mayoral Election ===
Costa Mesa Mayoral Election
Candidate	Votes	%
John Stephens (incumbent)	23,236	53.10
James Peters	20,520	46.90
Total votes	43,756	100

=== 2024 District 1 Election ===
During the City Council meeting of February 20, 2024, councilmember Don Harper announced his intent to resign from the City Council, citing family health issues. Despite this announcement, Harper remained on the City Council through the end of this term, and endorsed Mike Buley to succeed him.

Costa Mesa District 1 Election
Candidate	Votes	%
Mike Buley	4,849	54.15
Adam Ereth	4,106	45.85
Total votes	8,955	100

=== 2024 District 2 Election ===
Costa Mesa District 2 Election
Candidate	Votes	%
Loren Gameros (incumbent)	5,463	100
Total votes	5,463	100

=== 2024 District 6 Election ===
Costa Mesa District 6 Election
Candidate	Votes	%
Jeff Pettis	4,377	50.47
Jeffrey Harlan (incumbent)	4,295	49.53
Total votes	8,672	100

== 2026 Municipal Election ==
The 2026 municipal election will be held on November 3, 2026. The positions of mayor and councilmember for districts 3, 4, and 5 will be on the ballot. One ballot measure will be on the ballot. The incumbents for each of those positions are term-limited.

=== 2026 Mayoral Election ===
Incumbent mayor John Stephens is term-limited.

==== Candidates ====
The following candidates have filed candidate intention statements:

- Mike Buley, District 1 Councilmember
- Loren Gameros, District 2 Councilmember

==== Withdrawn ====
The following candidates have withdrawn from the race:

- James Peters, 2024 mayoral candidate
- Jose Toscano

=== 2026 District 3 Election ===
Incumbent Andrea Marr is term-limited.

==== Candidates ====
The following candidates have filed candidate intention statements:

- Daniel T. Morgan
- Cara Stewart

==== Did Not Qualify ====
The following candidate did not qualify:

- Jose Toscano

=== 2026 District 4 Election ===
Incumbent Manuel Chavez is term-limited.

==== Candidates ====
The following candidates have filed candidate intention statements:

- Angely Andrade Vallarta
- Fisher Derderian

=== 2026 District 5 Election ===
Incumbent Arlis Reynolds is term-limited.

==== Candidates ====
The following candidates have filed candidate intention statements:

- Kelly Brown
- Steve Smith

=== 2026 Measure C Election ===
Measure C, a business license reform measure, will be on the ballot.
