= California Climate Credit =

Carbon fee and dividend program in California

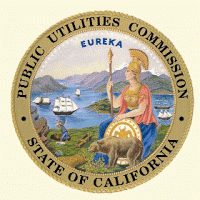
Seal of the California Public Utilities Commission

The California Climate Credit is a program administered by the California Public Utilities Commission and the California Air Resources Board in which ratepayers receive a refund on their gas and electricity bills. The refund is paid in biannual installments for residential customers and monthly for small businesses. The funding for the refund comes from the utility providers who pay a carbon tax for polluting the air, and the refund is the dividend portion of the carbon fee and dividend program created by the Global Warming Solutions Act of 2006. The refund represents only a portion of the carbon tax collected, with the rest of the funds collected going towards programs to fight climate change.

The program is only applied to customers of for-profit utilities. Municipal utilities in California (such as the Los Angeles Department of Water and Power, the Sacramento Municipal Utility District, and the Imperial Irrigation District) do not pay the carbon tax that funds the program because the California Public Utilities Commission only regulates privately owned utilities.

The program was announced in 2014 with the first payments made in 2015. The program was set to expire in 2020, but in 2017 it was extended to 2030. In 2025 the program was extended again, until 2045.

== Disbursement ==
No action is required to receive the credit; customers automatically receive a credit on their bill under the line item "California Climate Credit". As of 2022, the following utility companies participate in the program:

- PG&E (electricity and natural gas)
- SDG&E (electricity and natural gas)
- SCE (electricity only)
- Pacific Power (PacifiCorp) (electricity only)
- Liberty Utilities (CalPeco Electric) (electricity only)
- Bear Valley Electric Service (electricity only)
- All Community Choice Aggregators (CCAs) (electricity only)
- SoCalGas (natural gas only)
- Southwest Gas (natural gas only)

Customers of utilities that provide both electricity and natural gas receive separate credits for electricity and natural gas.

For residential customers, each customer gets the same credit amount, regardless of how much energy the customer consumes. For small businesses, the credit is proportional to the amount of energy used. For the majority of residential electricity consumers, half the annual credit is applied in April and the other half is applied October. For natural gas consumers, the credit is applied in April in full. 10.7 million eligible residential customers saved an average of $35 on their electricity bills in October 2014. The credit amount differs depending on the utility company. In April 2022, credits ranged from $29.96 per household to $132.85 per household.

Beginning in 2026, the timing of the credit for residential electricity customers shifted from half in April and half in October to half in August and the other half in September.

== COVID-19 Response ==
In 2020, the credit was modified slightly in response to COVID-19. The motivation for the COVID-19 modification was twofold: (1) offsetting the financial impact of predicted increased residential electric bills after the Governor's stay-at-home order was announced on March 19, 2020, and (2) by reducing utility bills, encouraging residential customers to invest in energy efficient and money-saving products. The credit in April 2020 was disbursed as normal, but the October 2020 credit was moved up and disbursed 50% in May 2020 and 50% in June 2020.
