= Costa Mesa Sanitary District =

Local government special district in California, U.S.

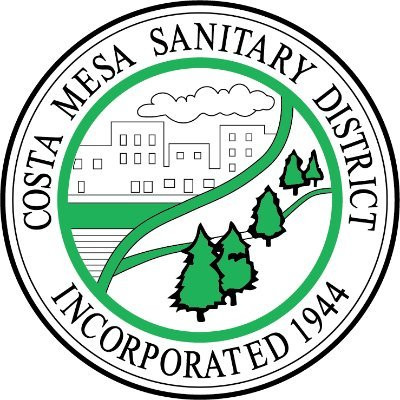

Special district overview
- Formed: February 11, 1944
- Headquarters: 290 Paularino Avenue, Costa Mesa, CA
- Special district executives: Michael Scheafer, President; Bob Ooten, Vice President; Arthur Perry, Secretary; Nicole Wiltshire, Director; Scott Carroll, General Manager
- Website: https://www.cmsdca.gov/

The Costa Mesa Sanitary District is a special district that manages trash and wastewater management in Costa Mesa. The district also oversees small portions of Newport Beach and unincorporated Orange County.

== History ==
Following submittal of a petition submitted to the Orange County Board of Supervisors in June 1943, a special election was called in the borders of the proposed district to form the special district. At that election, held February 8, 1944, there were 471 votes in favor of forming the district and 145 against. The Board of Supervisors officially established the district on February 11, 1944. The first Board of Directors included Charles TeWinkle, who was elected as the first president, and Claire M. Nelson, who both would later go on to serve on the inaugural Costa Mesa City Council.

In 1994, the City of Costa Mesa considered merging with the district. No decision was reached on the issue.

Jim Fitzpatrick was a board member elected in November 2010 who also began service on the Costa Mesa Planning Commission in December of that year. In 2012, the other four members of the Board sought to remove Fitzpatrick via lawsuit, contending that his service as a board member and as a Planning Commissioner was incompatible, which is not allowed under state law. Fitzpatrick resigned from the Planning Commission in May 2012, then from the District Board in January 2013, after reapplying to the Planning Commission that month.

Mesa Water District began exploring the possibility of a merger with the Costa Mesa Sanitary District in 2016. Mesa Water was in support of the merger, with the Sanitary District opposed to it. The question of a merger was put before the voters in an advisory measure, 2016's Measure TT. The measure passed, but as an advisory measure had no legal effect, and the Costa Mesa Sanitary District remained opposed and sued the Mesa Water District. In 2018, the lawsuit was finally settled.

In 2016, the district moved from their previous headquarters, in use since 2004, to their new larger facility and current headquarters.

In 2018, two controversies occurred in the district. A contractor was accused of overbilling the district by charging a higher than normal amount of hours. Also that year, a wastewater supervisor was accused of racism against employees. The issues were eventually settled in court in 2022.

== Governance ==
The Costa Mesa Sanitary District is governed by a five-member Board of Directors, each elected to a four-year term. Beginning in 2020, the Directors were elected by geographic district, rather than at-large, after being threatened by a lawsuit from attorney Kevin Shenkman. The current members of the Board are:

Position	Board Member	Division	Entered office	Term ends
President	Michael Schaefer	1	2010	2026
Vice President	Bob Ooten	3	2006	2026
Secretary	Arthur Perry	4	1992	2028
Director	Nicole Wiltshire	2	2024	2028
Director	Shayanne Wright	5	2025	2026

=== Past directors ===
Date	Directors				
2/11/1944	Claire Nelson	William Lord	H. Paul Norman	Charles TeWinkle	Otto Dodd
9/21/1950	Claire Nelson	William Lord	H. Paul Norman	Charles TeWinkle	Arthur Meyers
9/23/1954	Claire Nelson	Fred Allen	H. Paul Norman	Charles TeWinkle	Arthur Meyers
11/30/1954	Claire Nelson	Fred Allen	H. Paul Norman	vacant	Arthur Meyers
2/25/1955	Claire Nelson	Fred Allen	H. Paul Norman	Albert Hollister	Arthur Meyers
6/30/1955	Claire Nelson	vacant	H. Paul Norman	Albert Hollister	Arthur Meyers
9/1/1955	Claire Nelson	Ellis Porter	H. Paul Norman	Albert Hollister	Arthur Meyers
1/8/1959	vacant	Ellis Porter	H. Paul Norman	Albert Hollister	Arthur Meyers
1/22/1959	Richard Stephens	Ellis Porter	H. Paul Norman	Albert Hollister	Arthur Meyers
10/7/1964	Richard Stephens	Ellis Porter	H. Paul Norman	Thomas Thompson	Arthur Meyers
4/8/1965	Nathan Reade	Ellis Porter	H. Paul Norman	Claire Nelson	Arthur Meyers
12/1/1965	A.C. Swartz	Ellis Porter	H. Paul Norman	Claire Nelson	Arthur Meyers
6/1/1966	A.C. Swartz	Ellis Porter	H. Paul Norman	Claire Nelson	Kerm Rima
10/5/1966	A.C. Swartz	Ellis Porter	Thatcher Warren	Claire Nelson	Kerm Rima
7/15/1967	vacant	Ellis Porter	Thatcher Warren	Claire Nelson	Kerm Rima
8/1/1967	vacant	Ellis Porter	Thatcher Warren	vacant	Kerm Rima
8/16/1967	Francis Glockner	Ellis Porter	Thatcher Warren	Robert Briggs	Kerm Rima
9/4/1974	Francis Glockner	vacant	Thatcher Warren	Robert Briggs	Kerm Rima
1/9/1975	Francis Glockner	Walter Albers	Thatcher Warren	Robert Briggs	Kerm Rima
12/3/1975	Francis Glockner	Elvin Hutchinson	Thatcher Warren	Robert Briggs	Kerm Rima
1/4/1978	Francis Glockner	Elvin Hutchinson	vacant	Robert Briggs	Kerm Rima
3/1/1978	Francis Glockner	Elvin Hutchinson	Orma Crank	Robert Briggs	Kerm Rima
8/2/1978	Francis Glockner	Elvin Hutchinson	Orma Crank	Robert Briggs	vacant
11/9/1978	Francis Glockner	Elvin Hutchinson	Orma Crank	Robert Briggs	James Wahner
12/13/1979	Francis Glockner	Elvin Hutchinson	Orma Crank	Robert Hanson	James Wahner
8/14/1980	vacant	Elvin Hutchinson	Orma Crank	Robert Hanson	James Wahner
10/9/1980	Harry Green	Elvin Hutchinson	Orma Crank	Robert Hanson	James Wahner
12/15/1983	Harry Green	Steven Smith	Orma Crank	Robert Hanson	James Wahner
12/13/1984	Harry Green	vacant	Orma Crank	Robert Hanson	James Wahner
1/25/1985	Harry Green	James Gallacher	Orma Crank	Robert Hanson	James Wahner
5/20/1986	Harry Green	vacant	Orma Crank	Robert Hanson	James Wahner
7/10/1986	Harry Green	Eric Johnson	Orma Crank	Robert Hanson	James Wahner
11/1/1988	Harry Green	vacant	Orma Crank	Robert Hanson	James Wahner
12/8/1988	Harry Green	James Ferryman	Orma Crank	Robert Hanson	James Wahner
12/14/1989	Harry Green	James Ferryman	Orma Crank	vacant	James Wahner
1/31/1990	Harry Green	James Ferryman	Orma Crank	Franklin Cole	James Wahner
12/13/1990	Harry Green	James Ferryman	Nate Reade	Dick Sherrick	James Wahner
12/4/1992	Harry Green	James Ferryman	Nate Reade	Art Perry	James Wahner
12/10/1992	vacant	James Ferryman	Nate Reade	Art Perry	James Wahner
1/21/1993	Mike Scheafer	James Ferryman	Nate Reade	Art Perry	James Wahner
12/8/1994	Dan Worthington	James Ferryman	Nate Reade	Art Perry	Arlene Schafer
12/10/1998	Dan Worthington	James Ferryman	Greg Woodside	Art Perry	Arlene Schafer
12/6/2006	Gary Monahan	James Ferryman	Bob Ooten	Art Perry	Arlene Schafer
12/3/2010	Mike Scheafer	James Ferryman	Bob Ooten	Art Perry	Jim Fitzpatrick
1/14/2013	Mike Scheafer	James Ferryman	Bob Ooten	Art Perry	vacant
2/27/2013	Mike Scheafer	James Ferryman	Bob Ooten	Art Perry	Arlene Schafer
12/4/2020	Mike Scheafer	Brett Eckles	Bob Ooten	Art Perry	Arlene Schafer
12/10/2024	Mike Scheafer	Nicole Wiltshire	Bob Ooten	Art Perry	Arlene Schafer
8/1/2025	Mike Scheafer	Nicole Wiltshire	Bob Ooten	Art Perry	vacant
9/9/2025	Mike Scheafer	Nicole Wiltshire	Bob Ooten	Art Perry	Shayanne Wright
