= Moulton Niguel Water District =

Local government special district in California, U.S.

Coordinates: 33.5831°N 117.7024°W

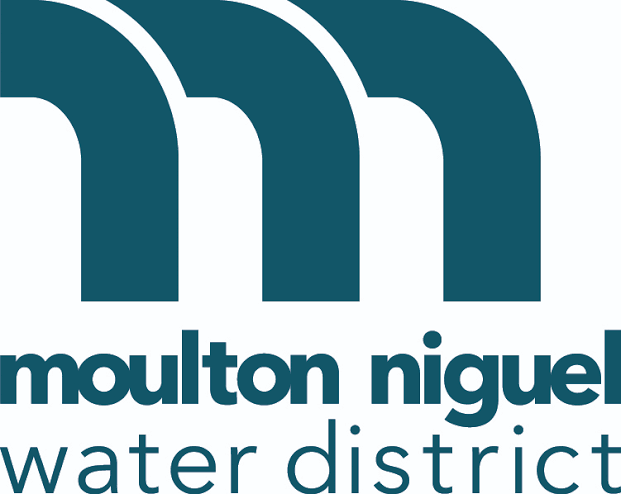

Special district overview
- Formed: November 18, 1960
- Headquarters: 26161 Gordon Rd, Laguna Hills, California
- Special district executive: Joone Kim-Lopez, General Manager/CEO
- Website: https://www.mnwd.com/

The Moulton Niguel Water District (MNWD) is an independent special district that provides water and sewer service to portions of Laguna Niguel, Aliso Viejo, Mission Viejo, Laguna Hills, Dana Point, and San Juan Capistrano.

== History ==
Moulton Niguel Water District was formed on November 18, 1960 to serve eight customers. Four years later, after the California Water District Act was amended, MNWD began providing wastewater services in addition to potable water.

Carl Kymla was General Manager of MNWD is 1978 when he and four other MNWD officials misappropriated public property by using MNWD equipment and employees in a personal capacity. Kymla was indicted, and following a 1979 agreement with prosecutors, resigned from his position.

The district was originally formed as a landowner district, where the only residents allowed to vote for Board Members were those who owned land. Sometime after a 1979 lawsuit against the Irvine Ranch Water District, MNWD agreed to become a publicly elected board.

Sewage spills related to MNWD caused closures at Doheny State Beach in 1987, 1988, 1991, 1992, 1997, 1998, 17 separate spills from 1999 to 2000, and 2001.

A 1987 water main break along Marguerite Parkway caused the closure of that road for over a month.

A 1996 bill by Speaker Curt Pringle proposed merging the El Toro Water District with MNWD, though the bill ultimately did not pass. In 2002, MNWD studied consolidation with the El Toro Water District. Ultimately, both Boards decided not to move forward with the merger.

Two home builders filed lawsuits against MNWD in 2012, arguing that pinhole leaks in copper water piping in their homes was due to faulty water treatment with chloramine. Pinhole leaks cause expensive damage to people's homes, and the builders claim that they must repipe houses at great expense to deal with the problem. Officials observed that only the two builders have filed suit, but as of late 2013 the number of lawsuits had expanded.

MNWD initially expressed interest in joining with other agencies in the construction of a desalination plant near San Juan Creek in 2016, but later backed out of the arrangement.

In 2016, MNWD halted payment of invoices to the South Orange County Wastewater Authority (SOCWA) related to their Coastal Treatment Plant, as MNWD rarely needed the sewage capacity and believed they should not have to pay for services that were not used by their customers. SOCWA's three other member agencies sued MNWD for failing terms of its contract which obligated payments to SOCWA. Those other agencies, called the PC 15 Agencies, sent campaign literature attacking MNWD claiming that MNWD would institute a "toilet tax," a claim the District rebuffed. After three years, in 2019, MNWD was ordered to pay its past invoices and SOCWA's legal fees, totaling $4.8 million. The settlement further stipulated that the contract is valid through 2030, and that MNWD must continue payments until then.

Then-Board President Duane Cave pleaded guilty to falsifying election nomination paperwork for the 2024 election in November 2025. An investigation by the District Attorney revealed that he declared within the district's boundaries, in Aliso Viejo, when in reality he lived with his wife in Rancho Santa Margarita. He resigned from his seat.

Also in 2025, Board Member Bill Moorhead was accused of misconduct, with those concerns being verified by MNWD staff. A resolution condemning Moorhead for his comments was agendized for a Board meeting, but ultimately failed. Orange County Employees Association members walked out of the meeting after the vote.

== Governance ==
The Moulton Niguel Water District is governed by a seven-member Board of Directors, each elected to a four-year term by district. The current members of the Board are:

Board Member	Term began	Term ends
Diane Rifkin	2022	2026
Donald Froelich	2022	2026
Bill Moorhead	2022	2026
Brian Parker	2025	2026
Brian Probolsky	2024	2028
Richard Fiore	2024	2028
Sherry Wanninger	2024	2028
