= Laguna Woods, California =

City in California, United States

- City
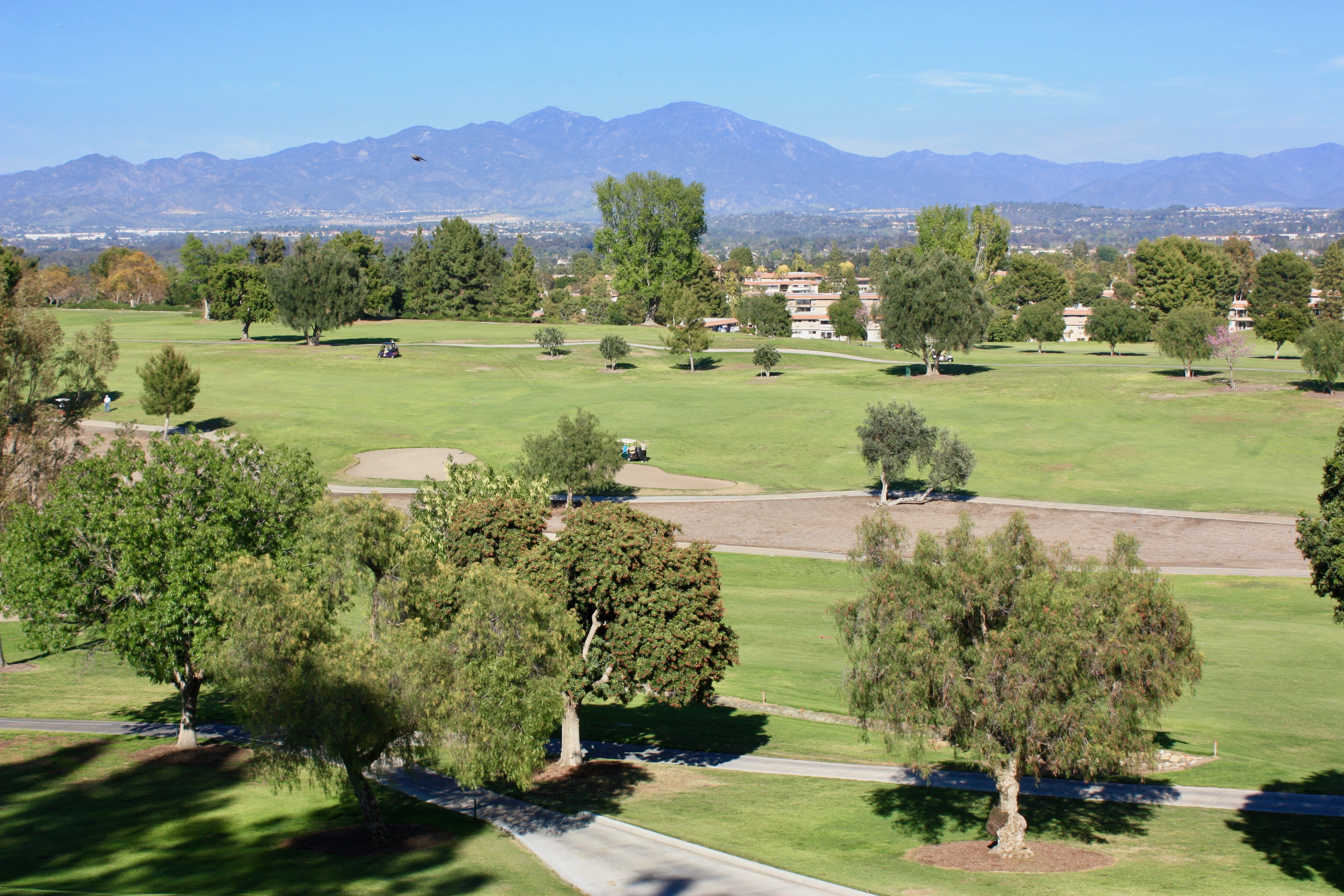
- Laguna Woods Village Golf Course

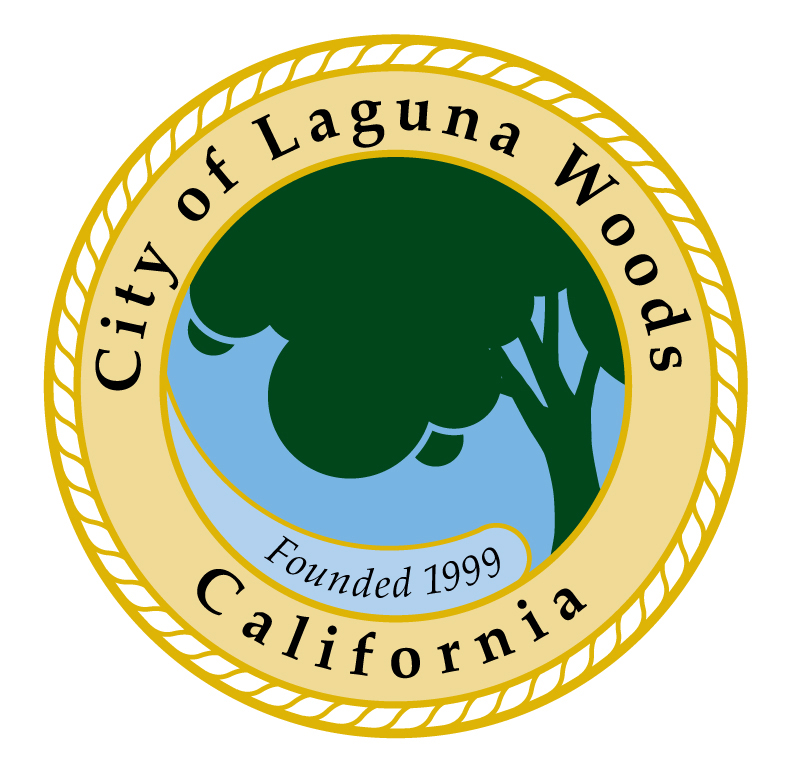
- Seal
- Interactive map of Laguna Woods, California
- Location in Southern California Location in California Location in the United States
- Coordinates: 33°36′33″N 117°43′58″W
- Country: United States
- State: California
- County: Orange
- Incorporated: March 24, 1999

Government
  - Type: Council-Manager
  - Mayor: Shari L. Horne
  - Mayor Pro Tem: Annie McCary
  - City Council: Cynthia Conners; Pearl Lee; Carol Moore
  - City Manager: Christopher Macon

Area
  - Total: 3.34 sq mi (8.66 km^{2})
  - Land: 3.34 sq mi (8.66 km^{2})
  - Water: 0 sq mi (0.00 km^{2}) 0.03%
- Elevation: 381 ft (116 m)

Population (2020)
  - Total: 17,644
  - Estimate (2024): 17,058
  - Density: 5,289.1/sq mi (2,042.12/km^{2})
- Time zone: UTC-8 (Pacific)
  - Summer (DST): UTC-7 (PDT)
- ZIP codes: 92637
- Area code: 949
- FIPS code: 06-39259
- GNIS feature ID: 1848119
- Website: www.lagunawoods.gov

Laguna Woods (luh-GOO-nuh; laguna being Spanish for 'lagoon') is a city in Orange County, California, United States. The population was 17,644 at the 2020 census, up from 16,192 at the 2010 census, with a median age of 74.5 (as of 2021).

Laguna Woods became Orange County's 32nd city on March 24, 1999, after local residents voted to incorporate. About ninety percent of the city consists of Laguna Woods Village, a private gated retirement community, formerly known as Leisure World. The other ten percent consists of businesses, some homes, and the city hall, which are accessible to the public. Incorporation efforts in the late 1990s were largely driven by the need for residents to have a stronger voice against the prospective construction of an international airport at the nearby decommissioned Marine Corps Air Station El Toro. The airport proposal was defeated, and the land in question has been tabbed for development as the Orange County Great Park.

== History ==
=== Indigenous ===
The Acjachemen and the Tongva were the original inhabitants of this area and throughout Orange County. The Acjachemen were the main residents dating back 16,000 years while the Tongva had fewer villages in the area.

=== 20th century ===
Laguna Woods, California occupies approximately three-square miles of land that was once a part of South Orange County's expansive Moulton Ranch. Prior to the 1960s, dry farming and cattle grazing dominated the area, with a few scattered ranch dwellings and barns.

In 1962, Ross Cortese, a young developer whose previous projects included Rossmoor and Leisure World Seal Beach, purchased a portion of the Moulton Ranch. His goal was to create a second Leisure World community or, as he said, “to supply the basic needs of life for people aged 52 and older; create a serene atmosphere of beauty; and provide security, recreation, and religious facilities – then leave the living to the individual.” In 1964 Leisure World Laguna Hills received its first residents.

The prospect of incorporation first arose in 1971 and was a lingering issue until 1996, when the potential for a reduction in county services and the possibility of a commercial airport at the nearby site of the former Marine Corps Air Station, El Toro, became very real concerns. Proponents of cityhood were successful in placing the issue of incorporation on the ballot for a special election on March 2, 1999.

On March 24, 1999, Laguna Woods officially became Orange County's 32nd city.

Used as a location for the Invaders TV series in 1967.

=== 21st century ===
On May 15, 2022, a shooting occurred at the Geneva Presbyterian Church in Laguna Woods. One person was killed and five others were injured. The attack is believed to have been motivated by anti-Taiwanese sentiment.

== Geography ==
According to the United States Census Bureau, the city has a total area of 3.3 square miles (8.5 km^{2}), which is virtually all land.

It is bordered by Laguna Hills, Aliso Viejo, Laguna Beach, as well as the Laguna Coast State Park and other natural open spaces.

== Demographics ==
Historical population
Census	Pop.	Note	%±
2000	16,507		—
2010	16,192		−1.9%
2020	17,644		9.0%
U.S. Decennial Census; 1990 2000 2010; 2020

Laguna Woods first appeared as a city in the 2000 U.S. census.

=== Racial and ethnic composition ===
Laguna Woods city, California – Racial and ethnic composition Note: the US Census treats Hispanic/Latino as an ethnic category. This table excludes Latinos from the racial categories and assigns them to a separate category. Hispanics/Latinos may be of any race.
Race / Ethnicity (NH = Non-Hispanic)	Pop 2000	Pop 2010	Pop 2020	% 2000	% 2010	% 2020
White alone (NH)	15,580	13,600	12,206	94.38%	83.99%	69.18%
Black or African American alone (NH)	41	105	158	0.25%	0.65%	0.90%
Native American or Alaska Native alone (NH)	18	17	9	0.11%	0.10%	0.05%
Asian alone (NH)	412	1,613	3,796	2.50%	9.96%	21.51%
Pacific Islander alone (NH)	4	10	10	0.02%	0.06%	0.06%
Some Other Race alone (NH)	7	18	35	0.04%	0.11%	0.20%
Mixed race or Multiracial (NH)	105	179	491	0.64%	1.11%	2.78%
Hispanic or Latino (any race)	340	650	939	2.06%	4.01%	5.32%
Total	16,507	16,192	17,644	100.00%	100.00%	100.00%

=== 2020 census ===
As of the 2020 census, Laguna Woods had a population of 17,644. The population density was 5,279.5 inhabitants per square mile (2,038.4/km^{2}).

The census reported that 99.6% of the population lived in households, 0.1% lived in non-institutionalized group quarters, and 0.2% were institutionalized. 100.0% of residents lived in urban areas, while 0.0% lived in rural areas.

There were 11,958 households, of which 0.9% had children under the age of 18. Of all households, 32.4% were married-couple households, 2.6% were cohabiting couple households, 15.0% were households with a male householder and no spouse or partner present, and 50.0% were households with a female householder and no spouse or partner present. About 56.3% of all households were made up of individuals, and 50.4% had someone living alone who was 65 years of age or older. The average household size was 1.47. There were 4,630 families (38.7% of all households).

The age distribution was 0.6% under the age of 18, 0.2% aged 18 to 24, 1.5% aged 25 to 44, 15.5% aged 45 to 64, and 82.2% aged 65 or older. The median age was 74.9 years. For every 100 females, there were 60.5 males, and for every 100 females age 18 and over there were 60.3 males age 18 and over.

There were 13,414 housing units at an average density of 4,013.8 units per square mile (1,549.7 units/km^{2}), of which 11,958 (89.1%) were occupied. Of occupied units, 72.5% were owner-occupied and 27.5% were renter-occupied. Of all housing units, 10.9% were vacant. The homeowner vacancy rate was 3.4% and the rental vacancy rate was 7.5%.

=== 2023 ACS estimates ===
In 2023, the US Census Bureau estimated that the median household income was $60,235, and the per capita income was $54,008. About 7.6% of families and 11.3% of the population were below the poverty line.

=== 2010 census ===
At the 2010 census Laguna Woods had a population of 16,192. The population density was 5,196.9 inhabitants per square mile (2,006.5/km^{2}). The racial makeup of Laguna Woods was 14,133 (87.3%) White (84.0% Non-Hispanic White), 110 (0.7%) African American, 24 (0.1%) Native American, 1,624 (10.0%) Asian, 10 (0.1%) Pacific Islander, 90 (0.6%) from other races, and 201 (1.2%) from two or more races. Hispanic or Latino of any race were 650 people (4.0%).

The census reported that 16,025 people (99.0% of the population) lived in households, 167 (1.0%) lived in non-institutionalized group quarters, and no one was institutionalized.

There were 11,302 households, 36 (0.3%) had children under the age of 18 living in them, 3,278 (29.0%) were married couples living together, 482 (4.3%) had a female householder with no husband present, 113 (1.0%) had a male householder with no wife present. There were 194 (1.7%) unmarried couples or partnerships, and 54 (0.5%) same-sex married couples or partnerships. 6,924 households (61.3%) were one person and 6,097 (53.9%) had someone living alone who was 65 or older. The average household size was 1.42. There were 3,873 families (34.3% of households); the average family size was 2.07.

The age distribution was 48 people (0.3%) under the age of 18, 56 people (0.3%) aged 18 to 24, 266 people (1.6%) aged 25 to 44, 2,948 people (18.2%) aged 45 to 64, and 12,874 people (79.5%) who were 65 or older. The median age was 77.0 years. For every 100 females, there were 55.1 males. For every 100 females age 18 and over, there were 55.0 males.

There were 13,016 housing units at an average density of 4,177.6 per square mile, of the occupied units 8,730 (77.2%) were owner-occupied and 2,572 (22.8%) were rented. The homeowner vacancy rate was 4.1%; the rental vacancy rate was 10.2%. 12,456 people (76.9% of the population) lived in owner-occupied housing units and 3,569 people (22.0%) lived in rental housing units.

According to the 2010 United States Census, Laguna Woods had a median household income of $36,818, with 9.9% of the population living below the federal poverty line.

== Government ==
In the state legislature, Laguna Woods is in the 37th senatorial district, represented by Republican Steven Choi, and in the 72nd Assembly district, represented by Republican Diane Dixon.

In the United States House of Representatives, Laguna Woods is in California's 40th congressional district, represented by Republican Young Kim, and in California's 47th congressional district, represented by Democrat Dave Min since 2025.

Additionally, in the Orange County Board of Supervisors, Laguna Woods is in the fifth district, represented by Katrina Foley.

According to the Orange County Registrar of Voters, as of May 14, 2025, Laguna Woods has 15,420 registered voters. Of those, 5,081 (36.22%) are registered Republicans, 5,041 (35.94%) are registered Democrats, and 3,392 (24.18%) have declined to state a political party/are independents.

=== Crime ===
2023 Uniform Crime Report data
	Aggravated Assault	Homicide	Rape	Robbery	Burglary	Larceny Theft	Motor Vehicle Theft	Arson
Laguna Woods	5	1	0	3	14	70	8	2

== Education ==
Laguna Woods itself has no public schools. The city is served by the Capistrano Unified School District and the Saddleback Valley Unified School District, as well as by the South Orange County Community College District.

== Infrastructure ==
=== Public Safety services ===
Fire protection in Laguna Woods is provided by the Orange County Fire Authority with ambulance service by Care Ambulance Service. Law enforcement is provided by the Orange County Sheriff's Department. Security services within Laguna Woods Village are provided by Laguna Woods Village Security.

=== Transportation ===
Orange County Transportation Authority operates bus transportation throughout Laguna Woods.

=== Water Services ===
Water in Laguna Woods is supplied by the El Toro Water District.
