= Detachment (territory) =

Formal loss of sovereignty over territory

Detachment (Old French de, from, and [at]tach, joining with a stake) under international law is the formal, permanent separation of and loss of sovereignty over some territory to another geopolitical entity (either adjacent or noncontiguous). Detachment can be considered the opposite or reverse of annexation.

A prominent example of detachment is the official and formal relinquishment of Alsace and Lorraine by Germany, following World War I. More often, however, detachment is a result of the creation of a new, sub-national geographical entity within one country. When detachment occurs within a country, the new entity is usually administered subsequently by a supervening entity, such as a national/federal government. For example, after the United States became independent in 1776, it was considered desirable, for various reasons, for the federal capital to be situated beyond the boundaries and jurisdiction of the constituent States. Consequently, in 1790, the States of Maryland and Virginia agreed to permanently detach adjoining areas on their border, to become the District of Columbia (DC), including the site of the future city of Washington DC. The formal removal of a smaller area from a city, town, or incorporated, non-urban district is also considered to be a form of detachment. For example, while the city of Alexandria, Virginia and the neighboring Alexandria County were detached from Virginia, to become a founding parts of the District of Columbia, the residents of Alexandria and Alexandria County (later Arlington County) began to campaign for the area's "retrocession" (or reattachment) to Virginia. This occurred in 1847.

== Suez Canal ==
The formal detachment of Egypt from the Ottoman Empire was a condition for British investment in the Suez Canal.

== League of Nations mandates ==
After World War I, a number of colonial territories and border territories were detached from the German Empire as well as portions of the Austrian-Hungarian Empire and the Ottoman Empire. Some of the detachments were incorporated directly into new countries, such as Yugoslavia, or annexed by existing countries such as Northern Schleswig into Denmark. Some, however, particularly in the Middle East and those of the German colonies, were placed under the "protection" of one or another of the Allied countries that had won the war, including Germany's concessions in China, Kiautschou and Chefoo. From a rule of law standpoint, the protectorates were not war booty but "mandates" from a legally-constituted international body and so detachment occurred without annexation.

== Sources ==
- Roberts, Adam (2006). "Transformative military occupation: applying the laws of war and human rights" (PDF). The American Journal of International Law. 100: 580–622. doi:10.1163/ej.9789004154285.i-590.90. Archived from the original (PDF) on 2011-07-25.
- Aldrich, Richard and Orange County LAFCO Staff (2012). "Annexations, Incorporations, and Reorganizations: Here's how we do it in California. How does your state do it?". American Planning Association.
