= Orange County Water District =

Agency overview
- Formed: 1933; 93 years ago
- Headquarters: 18700 Ward St Fountain Valley, California; 33°41′37″N 117°56′42″W
- Agency executive: Michael R. Markus, P.E., General Manager
- Website: www.ocwd.com

The Orange County Water District is a special district that manages the groundwater basin beneath central and northern Orange County, California. The groundwater basin provides a water supply to 19 municipal water agencies and special districts that serve 2.5 million Orange County residents. The Orange County Water District's service area covers approximately 350 square miles (910 km^{2}) and the District owns approximately 1,600 acres (650 ha) in and near the Santa Ana River, which it uses to capture water flows for groundwater recharge. Additionally, the Orange County Water District owns approximately 2,150 acres (870 ha) of land above the Prado Dam in the Prado Reservoir and uses that land for water conservation, water storage and water quality improvements. The water district's administrative offices and the Groundwater Replenishment System facilities are located in Fountain Valley, while it also operates various groundwater recharge facilities located in Anaheim and Orange.

== History ==
The Orange County Water District was formed by an act of the California State Legislature in 1933. The District Act was signed on June 14 of that year by Governor James Rolph, Jr.

The Orange County Water District was designated as an Orange County Historical Civil Engineering Landmark in 2006.

== Facilities ==
=== Groundwater Replenishment System ===
The Groundwater Replenishment System takes highly treated wastewater from the Orange County Sanitation District and purifies it using microfiltration, reverse osmosis and ultraviolet light with hydrogen peroxide. This produces high-quality water that exceeds state and federal drinking water standards. The GWRS has been operational since January 2008 and initially produced up to 70 million gallons of water daily. After the completion of an expansion in 2015, the plant produced 100 million gallons per day. It completed a final expansion in 2023, bringing capacity to up to 130 million gallons per day; enough water for one million people.

The Orange County Water and Sanitation Districts were awarded the Stockholm Industry Water Award in 2008 for pioneering work to develop the Groundwater Replenishment System, the world's largest water purification plant for groundwater recharge.

=== Groundwater recharge facilities ===
The Orange County Water District operates groundwater recharge facilities in the Cities of Anaheim and Orange. A 30-year lease agreement was approved in January 2013 to allow the district to construct an injection water well and well facilities at the Anaheim Regional Transportation Intermodal Center.

==== Facilities in Anaheim ====
- Anaheim Lake
- Burris Basin
- Crescent Basin
- Conrock Basin
- Five Coves Basin
- Gilbert Basin
- Huckleberry Basin
- Kraemer Basin
- La Jolla Basin
- La Palma Basin
- Lincoln Basin
- Miller Basin
- Mills Pond
- Miraloma Basin
- Olive Basin
- Placentia Basin
- Raymond Basin
- Warner Basin

==== Facilities in Orange ====
- Fletcher Basin
- Riverview Basin
- Santiago Basins (Diamond and Bond Pits)

=== Other facilities ===
- Prado wetlands
- Seawater barrier

== Member agencies and cities ==
There are 19 city water departments and water districts that are member agencies of the Orange County Water District and pump groundwater from the basin.

1. City of Anaheim
2. City of Buena Park
3. East Orange County Water District
4. City of Fountain Valley
5. City of Fullerton
6. City of Garden Grove
7. Golden State Water Company
8. City of Huntington Beach
9. Irvine Ranch Water District
10. City of La Palma
11. Mesa Water District
12. City of Newport Beach Water Department
13. City of Orange
14. City of Santa Ana Municipal Services
15. City of Seal Beach
16. Serrano Water District
17. City of Tustin
18. City of Westminster
19. Yorba Linda Water District

== Governance ==
The Orange County Water District is governed by a ten-member board of directors. Seven are publicly elected and three are appointed by the city councils of Anaheim, Fullerton, and Santa Ana, respectively. The board is responsible for the district's policies and decision making.

== See also ==
- Groundwater recharge
- Reclaimed water
- Santa Ana River
- Water in California
