= El Toro Water District =

Local government special district in California, U.S.

Coordinates: 33.6097°N 117.6982°W

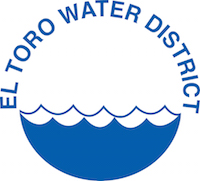

Special district overview
- Formed: September 1960
- Headquarters: 24251 Los Alisos Boulevard, Lake Forest, California
- Special district executive: Dennis Cafferty, General Manager
- Website: https://www.etwd.com

The El Toro Water District (ETWD) is an independent special district that provides water and sewer service to Laguna Woods and portions of Lake Forest, Mission Viejo, Laguna Hills, and Aliso Viejo.

The district is a member of the South Orange County Wastewater Authority.

== History ==
Shortly after formation of the District in 1960, preparations began for anticipated growth in South Orange County. ETWD issued a bond in 1961 to fund an aqueduct, water filtration plant, reservoir, and expanding the water distribution system.

Ross Cortese, developer of Leisure World, identified a few thousand acres of land near Laguna Hills in the ETWD service area that he wanted to develop in 1963. Initially skeptical, the Board agreed to provide water to ranchers in the area while the newly formed Rossmoor Water Company would provide domestic water service.

By 1970, the need for a regional sewer system became apparent. Rossmoor Sanitation, a private company, initially provided some sewer services but was ineligible to receive federal or state grant funding. ETWD, on behalf of Rossmoor Sanitation, and six other agencies then formed the Aliso Water Management Agency (AWMA).

When the district was formed, it was a "landowner district" where votes for its Board of Directors were awarded exclusively to landowners on a basis of one vote for each dollar of assessed value. In 1981, Assembly Bill 368 by Assemblymember Marian Bergeson transitioned ETWD from a landowning district to a resident owning district.

The Laguna Hills Utility Company, parent company of the Rossmoor Water Company, now called the Laguna Hills Water Company, and Rossmoor Sanitation, now called Laguna Hills Sanitation, proposed to the ETWD Board that the District acquire their operations in 1982. In September of 1983, ETWD agreed to the purchase of both companies, acquiring sewer services and become a water retailer rather than wholesaler.

A 1996 bill by Speaker Curt Pringle proposed merging ETWD with the Moulton Niguel Water District, though the bill ultimately did not pass. In 2002, the Moulton Niguel Water District studied consolidation with ETWD. Ultimately, both Boards decided not to move forward with the merger.

The 2000 consolidation of the Irvine Ranch Water District and the Los Alisos Water District raised concerns in the ETWD service area. Talks included ceding territory to IRWD or including the entire ETWD area in consolidation discussions. The district remains independent.

== Governance ==
The El Toro County Water District is governed by a five-member Board of Directors, each elected to a four-year term by district. The current members of the Board are:

Board Member	Term began	Term ends
Mike Gaskins	2022	2026
Kathryn Freshley	2022	2026
Mark Monin	2024	2028
Kay Havens	2024	2028
Wyatt McClean	2024	2026
