= Orange County LAFCO =

Government agency

Local Agency Formation Commission overview
- Formed: 1963
- Headquarters: 2677 North Main St, Santa Ana, CA
- Local Agency Formation Commission executive: Luis Tapia, Executive Officer
- Website: https://www.oclafco.org

The Orange County Local Agency Formation Commission, or OC LAFCO, is a government agency that makes decisions regarding boundaries for cities, unincorporated territory (land not located within a city) and special districts (local agencies which provide water, sewer, parks and recreation and other municipal services) within Orange County, California. Orange County LAFCO offices are located in Santa Ana.

== History ==
Following World War II, Orange County experienced a dramatic growth in population and economic development, increasing the demand for housing and public services. The population in Orange County grew from 216,224 in 1950 to 703,925 just ten years later in 1960. By 1970, the County’s population exceeded 1.4 million residents. As development pressures increased to serve Orange County’s growth, land developers tried to find the fastest and most cost effective means of providing basic municipal services such as water, roads, fire protection and sewers. Often this was done without consideration of the long-term consequences on municipal service delivery to Orange County residents.

During the 1950s and early 1960s, some Orange County cities began to haphazardly add annex territory to their boundaries to serve newly developing areas. In addition, numerous special districts were created – many of them with overlapping boundaries, which created inefficiencies and higher costs for residents. To address these issues not only in Orange County, but throughout California, Local Agency Formation Commissions were established by the State Legislature in 1963 in each California county.

In 1985 the Commission approved the annexation of the 82-acre "Spotted Bull" area with roughly 30 homes into San Juan Capistrano.

That same year, the Commission also approved a ballot measure for voters in the Mission Viejo area to decide whether to form a community services district, which was then seen as a step prior to full incorporation. Following overwhelming approval of the district vote, residents moved forward towards full incorporation. Afterwards, a 1987 study found that an incorporated Mission Viejo would have a surplus if incorporated.

In 1986, another community services district ballot measure was approved for the Laguna Niguel area despite a staff recommendation against the proposal after receiving support from Supervisor Thomas F. Riley. That vote, originally scheduled for June 1986 was pushed back to November following community outcry.

After a previous incorporation bid failed in 1970, the communities of Dana Point and Capistrano Beach considered a joint application for incorporation in 1986. Capistrano Beach residents had previously supported annexation into the city of San Juan Capistrano, but soured on the idea after a different annexation went through. Annexation into San Clemente also wasn't popular, following 18 different previous annexations of Capistrano Beach territory.

A 1986 law by Assemblyman Bill Bradley increased the cost of new incorporations. That law further prompted Mission Viejo, Laguna Niguel, Dana Point, Capistrano Beach, and the new proposal of North Tustin to submit incorporation applications.

The Orange County Transportation Commission proposed in 1986 to create a county freeway authority, which involved seeking LAFCO approval. The proposal would divert about $25 million from existing districts, including school districts, with some large school districts possibly losing up to $1 million.

In 1987, with the incorporation of Laguna Niguel moving forward, residents of the South Laguna community, who were previously opposed to annexation into any city, requested to be annexed into the city of Laguna Beach, due to concerns that the territory would instead be annexed into Laguna Niguel. Concurrently, Commissioners considering Dana Point's incorporation efforts placed five coastal subdivisions that were included on Laguna Niguel's incorporation application into the boundaries of the proposed Dana Point. This move angered Laguna Niguel residents, which would become landlocked by the decision, however, Commissioners claimed a poll of residents of the coastal subdivisions indicated a preference towards joining Dana Point rather than Laguna Niguel. Commissioners decided on scheduling an advisory election in the coastal subdivisions for residents to choose which proposed city they would like to join. Incorporation elections would follow in each of the cities after the boundaries were resolved.

During the 1991 process where the communities of El Toro and Laguna Hills were considering incorporating, the County of Orange officially opposed those efforts citing possible revenue losses.

California Assembly Speaker Curt Pringle in 1996 originally proposed the consolidation of most special districts in the county into one countywide entity. A later version, which still died, involved various mergers of different special districts. In 1997, as Minority Leader, he introduced a bill which would mandate certain mergers and allow the electorate to vote on others, avoiding the LAFCO process.

In 2005, the Commission recommended that Villa Park's sphere of influence be eliminated, essentially calling for its disincorporation. Villa Park remains a city.

After previous efforts to incorporate or be annexed into the city of Seal Beach were rejected, the Commission in 2010 approved the annexation of the Sunset Beach community into the city of Huntington Beach, following prior approval by the Huntington Beach City Council for the annexation. A lawsuit against the action was filed.

In 2023, following an Orange County Grand Jury report suggesting consolidation the prior year, the Orange County Water District (OCWD) applied to OC LAFCO to study merging with the Municipal Water District of Orange County (MWDOC). Following release of OC LAFCO's report which found consolidation financially feasible, OCWD favored consolidation while MWDOC opposed it.

== Authority ==
The legal authority and mandate for Orange County LAFCO, like all LAFCOs in California, are defined by the Cortese-Knox-Hertzberg Local Government Reorganization Act of 2000 (Government Code Section 56000 et seq).

Orange County LAFCO’s determinations involving the boundaries of cities and special districts can range from simple to complex actions. The power of LAFCOs to regulate local boundaries includes nine types of boundary changes:

- Annexations (adding territory to a city or special district)
- Detachments (removing territory from a city or special district)
- Disincorporation (terminating the existence of a city)
- Dissolutions (terminating the existence of a special district)
- Formations (creating a new special district)
- Incorporations (creating a new city)
- Mergers (terminating a special district and merging those responsibilities with a city)
- Consolidations (joining two or more cities or special districts into a single agency)
- Reorganizations (two or more changes or organization in a single proposal)

== Governance ==
Orange County LAFCO consists of an 11-member Commission, seven regular members and four alternate members. Commissioners are appointed as follows:

- Two regular members from the Orange County Board of Supervisors representing the County and one alternate member from that body
- Two regular members from among all city council members or mayors representing Orange County cities and one alternate city council member or mayor, appointed by the city selection committee
- Two regular members from among all board members of special districts representing special districts and one alternate special district member, appointed by the independent special district selection committee
- One regular public “at-large” member and one alternate public "at-large" member, appointed by the other regular members of the commission

Regular members

Commissioner	Appointing Authority	First Appointed	Term Ends
Don Wagner	OC Board of Supervisors	2019	2026
Wendy Bucknum	City Selection Committee	2015	2028
Douglass Davert	Independent Special District Selection Committee	2018	2026
James Fisler	Independent Special District Selection Committee	2011	2028
Peggy Huang	City Selection Committee	2025	2026
Derek McGregor	OC LAFCO	2009	2026
Vacant	OC Board of Supervisors	N/A	2027

Alternate members

Alt. Commissioner	Appointing Authority	First Appointed	Term Ends
Kathryn Freshley	Independent Special District Selection Committee	2019	2026
Carol Moore	City Selection Committee	2023	2028
Lou Penrose	OC LAFCO	2017	2029
Vacant	OC Board of Supervisors	N/A	2027
