= Mesa Water District =

Local government special district in California, U.S.

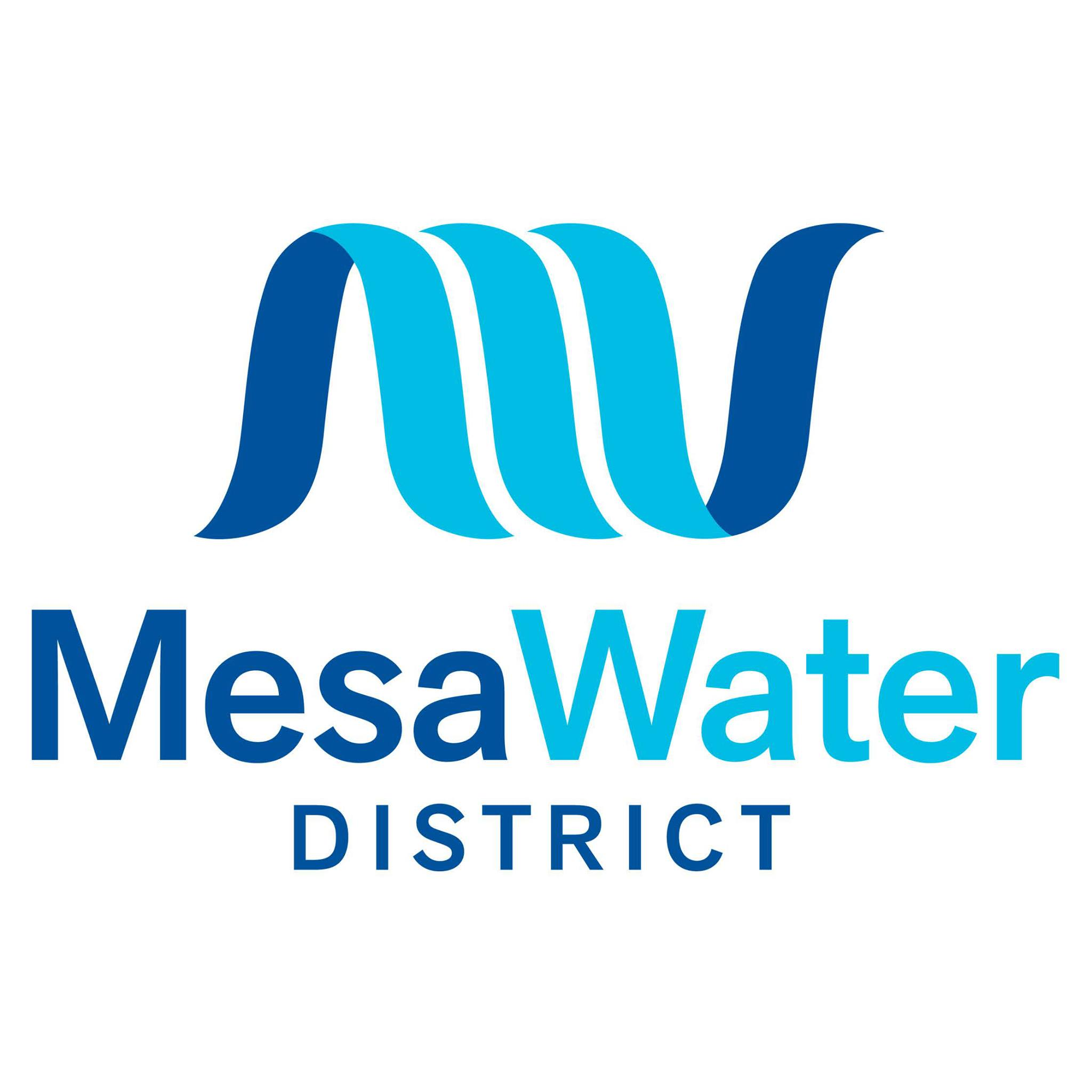

Special district overview
- Formed: January 1, 1960
- Headquarters: 1965 Placentia Avenue Costa Mesa, CA
- Special district executives: Marice Depasquale, President; Shawn Dewane, Vice President; Jim Atkinson, Director; Fred Bockmiller, Director; James Fisler, Director; Paul Shoenberger, General Manager
- Website: https://www.mesawater.org/

The Mesa Water District is a special district that manages water distribution to most of Costa Mesa, a portion of Newport Beach, and John Wayne Airport.

== History ==
The city of Costa Mesa, having been incorporated in 1953, provided municipal services such as a water supply to its residents. In 1957, the city held a special bond election for the construction of water-related infrastructure, which failed. During this period, various other water districts had been in operation in the Costa Mesa area, including the Newport Heights Irrigation District (formed 1918), the Fairview County Water District (formed 1946), and the Newport Mesa County Water District (formed 1954), which had previously replaced the Newport Mesa Irrigation District. With the multiple districts and the city having overlapping boundaries, Governor Edmund Brown, Sr. signed the Costa Mesa District Merger Law in 1959, which combined the districts and city services into one. Officially designated as the Costa Mesa County Water District, the district began operations on January 1, 1960.

In 1978, legislation was adopted to change the name to the Mesa Consolidated Water District. In January 2013, following a $500,000 rebranding effort, the district again changed their name to the Mesa Water District.

In the early 1990s, Mesa Water faced significant community opposition over the construction of a large underground water reservoir at the former Lindbergh School site. Proposed in 1991 as a roughly $15 million project to improve groundwater storage and reduce reliance on imported water, the reservoir drew criticism from nearby residents concerned about property values, construction impacts, safety, and rate increases associated with long-term bond financing. Residents ultimately sued the district, and while construction proceeded, the litigation resulted in a settlement that imposed mitigation measures such as limits on construction hours. By 1994, the 18-million-gallon reservoir was under construction, generating ongoing complaints about dust and noise, but it was also paired with an expansion and improvement of the adjacent Lindbergh Park, including new recreational space to be built atop the completed reservoir.

Board president Tom Nelson resigned from the board following 17 years of service in 1995 following continued controversy that he was not a resident of the district. Despite the secretary of state's office confirming he was a valid candidate, he resigned.

In 1996, Mesa Water pursued purchasing the Santa Ana Heights Mutual Water Company. Following a competing bid by the Irvine Ranch Water District being accepted by the company's shareholders, officials at the Mesa Water District filed a complaint with the Orange County District Attorney's office, questioning the merger's legality as it had not been reviewed by the Orange County LAFCO. The Orange County LAFCO later voted to approve the merger between the company and Irvine Ranch.

Board members James Fisler and Shawn Dewane faced controversy in 2014 for charging a stipend following attendance at special and political events not necessarily related to their service on the Mesa Water Board.

Mesa Water District began exploring the possibility of a merger with the Costa Mesa Sanitary District in 2016. Mesa Water was in support of the merger, with the Sanitary District opposed to it. The question of a merger was put before the voters in an advisory measure, 2016's Measure TT. The measure passed, but as an advisory measure had no legal effect, and the Costa Mesa Sanitary District remained opposed and sued the Mesa Water District. In 2018, the lawsuit was finally settled.

Mesa Water has faced controversies following rate increases in 2010, 2017, and 2022.

== Governance ==
Mesa Water District is governed by a five-member Board of Directors, each elected to a four-year term. Each director is elected by geographic division and has been since the districts formation in 1960. The current members of the Board are:

| Position | Board Member | Division | Entered office | Term ends |
|---|---|---|---|---|
| President | Marice DePasquale | 3 | 2017 | 2028 |
| Vice President | Shawn Dewane | 5 | 2005 | 2026 |
| Director | Jim Atkinson | 4 | 1998 | 2026 |
| Director | Fred Bockmiller | 1 | 1996 | 2028 |
| Director | James Fisler | 2 | 2009 | 2028 |
