= Irvine Ranch Water District =

Local government special district in California, U.S.

Special district overview
- Formed: January 23, 1961
- Headquarters: 15600 Sand Canyon Ave, Irvine, CA
- Special district executive: Paul A. Cook, General Manager
- Website: https://www.irwd.com

Irvine Ranch Water District (IRWD) is a special district formed in 1961 and incorporated under the California water code. The IRWD headquarters is located in Irvine, California.

IRWD offers potable water sales, sewer service, and the sale of reclaimed (or recycled) water. IRWD serves the city of Irvine, portions of Costa Mesa, Lake Forest, Newport Beach, Orange, and Tustin, and unincorporated areas of Orange County.

== History ==
The Irvine Ranch Water District was formed on January 23, 1961.

When the district was formed, it was a "landowner district" where votes were exclusively awarded to landowners on the basis of one vote for each dollar of assessed value. The district proposed legislation to phase-in publicly elected directors, though city leaders filed a lawsuit in 1979 claiming the process was not fast enough. Following a court ruling that the phasing plan was unconstitutional, IRWD changed to a publicly elected board.

In 1985, the District issued over $59 million in bonds to finance expansion of sewerage treatment facilities.

The Orange County LAFCO, a government agency in charge of determining special district boundaries, in 1987 considered transferring territory in Portola Hills from the Santa Ana Mountains County Water District (now called the Trabuco Canyon Water District) to IRWD. IRWD now serves Portola Hills.

During construction around the Michaelson Wastewater Treatment Plant in 1990, the district flattened wetlands and filled in about five acres. The city of Irvine, the U.S. Fish and Wildlife Service, and the Army Corps of Engineers conducted an investigation into whether any laws were broken.

Towards the end of the 1986-1992 California drought, the District proposed a rate structure where excessive water users would pay double the water rates, with certain exemptions. That proposal was adopted and a similar tiered water rate structure was subsequently proposed, adopted, and continues to this day.

As part of a water conservation program scam, a District employee embezzled $2.2 million. The district employee and a consultant were both found guilty, with a third consultant being found not guilty.

A 2015 water main break in Newport Beach spilled 1 million gallons of water and inundated an underground parking garage.

In June 2015, IRWD initiated a lawsuit against the Orange County Water District seeking to avoid certain payments related to groundwater pumping. In 2023, a trial court ruled against IRWD. Following an appeal in 2024, the trial court's opinion was affirmed by the California Courts of Appeal.

=== Consolidations ===
A 1996 bill by Speaker Curt Pringle proposed the consolidation of several water districts, with a merger into the Irvine Ranch Water District being an option for several of them. Those districts included Serrano Water District, East Orange County Water District, and Mesa Water District. The bill ultimately failed.

In 1997, IRWD and the Santa Ana Heights Mutual Water Company began with a proposed merger. Officials at the Mesa Water District filed a complaint with the Orange County District Attorney's office, questioning the merger's legality as it had not been reviewed by the Orange County LAFCO. Shareholders had previously elected to merge with IRWD. The Orange County LAFCO later voted to approve the merger.

In 1998, the Carpenter Irrigation District's reorganization into IRWD became effective.

In September of 2000, Orange County LAFCO approved of IRWD taking over the smaller Los Alisos Water District. Beginning January 2001, residents began being served by IRWD.

On July 6, 2006, the Santiago County Water District consolidated with IRWD.

On April 10, 2008, the merger between IRWD and the Orange Park Acres Mutual Water Company was approved by their shareholders. The merger was effective June 1, 2008.

== Governance ==
IRWD is governed by a five-member publicly elected Board of Directors. These five elected officials are responsible for the District's policies and decision making. Public elections are held every two years and Directors serve four-year terms.

Director	Division	First entered office	Term began	Term ends
John Withers	1	1989	2024	2028
Steve LaMar	2	2009	2022	2026
Doug Reinhart	3	2004	2022	2026
Daniel Ferons	4	2024	2024	2028
Peer Swan	5	1979	2022	2026

== District facilities and water supply ==
IRWD's drinking water comes from two primary sources: local groundwater and imported water from the Metropolitan Water District of Southern California. The blending of these sources varies according to the time of year and the geographic location within the District. In addition, IRWD has an extensive recycled water program that is used for irrigation or other non-potable purposes. The District's diversified supply ensures a reliable water supply during times of drought, regulatory constraints and other emergencies. A diverse water supply portfolio helps to keep IRWD rates as low as possible.

=== San Joaquin Marsh Wildlife Sanctuary ===
The San Joaquin Marsh Wildlife Sanctuary is a 300-acre (120ha; 0.47 sq mi) constructed wetland in the flood plain of the San Diego Creek north of its outlet into the Upper Newport Bay. The site is owned by IRWD.

Previously used as farmland and as a duck hunting range through 1988, restoration of the site as wetlands concluded in 2000.

=== Recycled water ===
By 1990, the District was experimenting with dual piping systems that will allow reclaimed water to be used in toilets in new office buildings

In 2000, the District began building new pipeline to increase the amount of reclaimed water that could be used for landscaping and irrigation.
