= Orange County Sanitation District =

Coordinates: 33°41′33″N 117°56′23″W

The Orange County Sanitation District (OCSD) is a public agency in the state of California that provides wastewater collection, treatment, and disposal services for approximately 2.6 million people in central and northwest Orange County. OCSD is a special district that is governed by a board of directors consisting of 25 board members appointed from 20 cities, two sanitary districts, two water districts and one representative from the Orange County Board of Supervisors. OCSD has two operating facilities that treat wastewater from residential, commercial and industrial sources. It is the third largest wastewater treatment facility west of the Mississippi River. OCSD and the Orange County Water District were awarded the Stockholm Industry Water Award in 2008 for pioneering work to develop with Trojan Technologies (Canada) the Groundwater Replenishment System, the world's largest water purification plant for groundwater recharge. Orange County Sanitation District is commonly referred to as OCSD, though not to be confused with Orange County Sheriff's Department that shares the same acronym.

== History ==
In 1954, the County Sanitation District of Orange County began operating and took over the duties of the Orange County Joint Outfall Sewer (JOS), which was the sewage outfall system that extended into the Pacific Ocean. The name was changed from County Sanitation District of Orange County to Orange County Sanitation District or OCSD in 1998. In 2020, their corporate identity was changed from OCSD to OC SAN.

== Facilities ==
=== Plant No. 2 ===
At Plant No. 2 there are several facilities that operate to treat wastewater and dispose of solids.

==== Trunklines ====
Wastewater enters into Plant No. 2 via five trunklines: Miller-Holder, Bushard, Coast, Districts 5 and 6, and Interplant. The District 5 and 6 trunkline connects to the Coast trunkline at a vortex structure within the plant. Once inside Plant No. 2, the flow is measured.

==== Headworks ====
The trunklines connect into a common discharge channel located at the Headworks D facility. The wastewater flows through up to six bar screens, which scrape out large material, like rags and sanitary products, and drop the material into two sluiceways that transport the screening into respective washer compactors. The washer compactors help remove organics, which are odor causing and take up space in hauling bins. The washed screenings are then transported via screw conveyors to a large bin. Once full, the bin is transported to an offsite facility for disposal. Once through the barscreens, up to 7 main sewage pumps (commonly referred to as a MSP) located at the Headworks D pump the wastewater into up to six grit basins. The grit basins help settle out grit, which can damage equipment inject air through diffusers into the wastewater to freshen the water to decrease septicity and to help settle out grit material. Grit material consisting of inorganics, like eggshells, corn, and sand and dirt, is removed from wastewater to prevent damage to pumps and disruption of other processes like sludge digestion by consuming unnecessary space. The grit is dewatered in up to two grit classifiers before it is dropped into a hauling bin. Like the screenings, the grit is transported to an offsite facility for disposal. From the grit basins, the wastewater flows into three splitter boxes where ferric chloride (FeCl_{3}) is injected into the wastewater to increase sludge settling in the primary clarifiers. Bleach (NaOCL) may also be added into A, B, and/or C splitter boxes to work to assist in sludge settling. The splitter boxes are used to control the amount of flow, measured in millions of gallons per day (MGD), that flows into the three distribution boxes, which further separate wastewater for treatment in primary clarifiers.

==== Primary Clarifiers ====
Wastewater flows from the Headworks facility into three distribution boxes. The wastewater flows from each distribution box into designated primary clarifiers. The distribution of the wastewater is as follows: "A" distribution box dispenses water to D, E, F, and G primary clarifiers, "B" distribution box dispenses water to H, I, J, K, and L primary clarifiers, and "C" distribution box dispenses water to M, N, O, P, and Q primary clarifiers. The sludge that settles out to the bottom of the clarifiers and the scum that is removed from the top of the clarifiers is then pumped to one of two sludge blending facility tanks, where it is mixed before being pumped to anaerobic digesters.
