= American States Water =

American water and electricity utility company headquartered in San Dimas, California

American States Water Company
- Company type: Public
- Traded as: NYSE: AWR; S&P 600 component
- Industry: water utilities
- Founded: 1929
- Headquarters: San Dimas, California, United States
- Area served: United States
- Services: water utilities; electric utilities; contracted services
- Revenue: ▼$595.5 Million (As of 2024)
- Number of employees: 846
- Website: http://www.aswater.com

American States Water Co. (NYSE: AWR) is an American water and electricity utility company. It was founded in 1929 and is headquartered in San Dimas, California. The company has 50-year privatization contracts with U.S. government as a government contractor for its water system service. It is the water utility provider for about 246,000 customers and the electricity provider for over 23,000 customers in Big Bear Lake and California under the name Bear Valley Electric.

== Background ==
As of February 2014, the company has a market capitalization of $1.12 billion and an enterprise value of 1.42 billion. It operates its business through three segments including water, electric and contracted service.

The company is the parent company of Golden State Water Company (GSWC) and American States Utility Services, Inc. (ASUS) as well as its subsidiaries. GSWC serves more than 45,000 customers in California. ASUS is a contractor for the U.S. government.

In June 2013, GSWC entered into an agreement to purchase all of the operating assets of Rural Water Company, which used to serve approximately 1,000 customers in the county of San Luis Obispo, California, In the winter of 2014, the company continued to provide water service to the customer despite the California drought.

== Bear Valley Electric ==
Bear Valley Electric
- Company type: subsidiary
- Industry: Electricity
- Headquarters: Big Bear Lake, California, United States
- Products: Electricity
- Parent: American States Water Company
- Website: Bear Valley Electric

The Bear Valley Electric Service Inc. (BVES), a subsidiary of American States Water, is the utility that provides electricity to the Big Bear valley in the San Bernardino Mountains, California, United States. It was established in the Big Bear Valley in 1929.

== Locations ==
=== Golden State Water ===
Golden State Water operates systems based in:

- San Dimas
- Los Alamitos
  - West Orange County
- Placentia
  - Yorba Linda
  - Cowan Heights
- Central Basin East
  - Artesia
  - Norwalk
- Central Basin West
  - Bell/Bell Gardens
  - Florence-Graham
  - Hollydale
  - Willowbrook
- Claremont
- Culver City
- San Gabriel
  - South San Gabriel
  - South Arcadia
- Barstow
- Calipatria
- Bay Point
- Arden Cordova
  - Cordova
  - Arden
  - Robbins
- Wrightwood
- Los Osos
  - Los Osos
  - Edna
- Santa Maria
  - Orcutt
  - Nipomo
  - Cypress Ridge
  - Lake Marie
  - Tanglewood
- Simi Valley
- Clearlake
- Morongo Valley
  - Morongo del Sur
  - Morongo del Norte
- Apple Valley
  - Desert View
  - Lucerne
  - North Apple Valley
  - South Apple Valley
