= 2018 Orange County, California District Attorney election =

- June 5, 2018 (first round); November 6, 2018 (runoff)
- Turnout: 42.9% (first round), 71.0% (runoff)
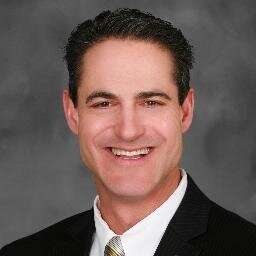

Candidate	Todd Spitzer	Tony Rackauckas	Brett Murdock
First round	191,346; 35.2%	209,148; 38.5%	121,818; 22.4%
Runoff	484,830; 53.2%	425,764; 46.8%	Eliminated
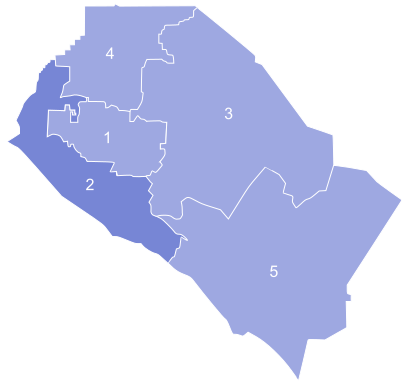
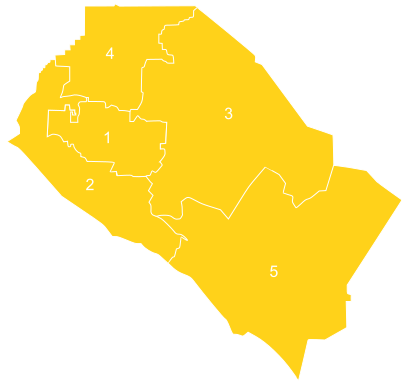
- Rackauckas: 30–40% 40–50% Spitzer: 50–60%
District Attorney before election
Tony Rackauckas
Elected District Attorney
Todd Spitzer

The 2018 Orange, County, California District Attorney election took place on June 5, 2018, for the first round. Because no candidate received a majority in the first round, a runoff took place November 6, 2018, to elect the Orange County, California District Attorney. County-level elections in California are officially nonpartisan. Because no candidate received a majority, a runoff was held on November 6, 2018.

Incumbent District Attorney Tony Rackauckas is running for a sixth term. Rackauckas was re-elected in 2014 with 73% of the vote in 2014.

In July 2017, Orange County Supervisor Todd Spitzer declared that he will challenge Rackauckas due to scandals within the Orange County District Attorney's office.

In May 2018, former mayor of Brea Brett Murdock declared candidacy.

Rackauckas has faced criticism for allegedly mishandling jailhouse informants, making it more difficult to convict and sentence defendants.

On September 22, 2017, Scott Dekraai was sentenced to eight terms of life in prison without the possibility of parole, one term for each of his victims and to seven years to life for attempted murder in a Seal Beach salon shooting. The jailhouse informant scandal allegedly involving Rackauckas made it impossible to seek the death penalty for Dekraai.

The American Civil Liberties Union filed a complaint claiming the alleged widespread use of jailhouse informants by Orange County law enforcement officeholders has continued for decades. The United States Department of Justice and California Attorney General's office both launched probes investigating the jailhouse informant case. As of April 4, 2018, no charges have been filed against any Orange County law enforcement official.

On April 26, 2018, a forum for candidates sponsored by conservative PAC Hispanic 100 was held.

Assistant Orange County Public Defender Scott Sanders claims California Attorney General Xavier Becerra and United States Attorney General Jeff Sessions have turned a blind eye to the use of jailhouse informants. Sanders discovered that more than 140 cases might have been mishandled due to the use of jailhouse informants. Sanders claims that it is the largest jailhouse informant scandal in United States history.

On November 6, 2018, Spitzer, a Republican, defeated incumbent Republican Rackauckas, denying Rackauckas a sixth term.

== Candidates ==
- Note: County elections in California are officially nonpartisan. The parties below identify which party label each candidate would have run under if given the option.

=== Declared ===
- Lenore Albert-Sheridan(Democratic Party)
- Brett Murdock, former mayor of Brea (Democratic Party)
- Tony Rackauckas, incumbent District Attorney (Republican Party)
- Todd Spitzer, Orange County Supervisor (Republican Party)

== General election ==
=== Endorsements ===
Brett Murdock

U.S. Representatives

- Alan Lowenthal U.S. Representative, (D-CA-47)
- Linda Sánchez, U.S. Representative (D-CA-38)

State-level officials

- Sharon Quirk-Silva, State Assemblywoman (D-65)

Other individuals

- Fran Sdao, Chairwoman of the Democratic Party of Orange County

Organizations

- Costa Mesa Democratic Club
- Democratic Party of Orange County
- Orange County Young Democrats
- Laguna Woods Democratic Club
- Seal Beach Leisure World Democratic Club
Tony Rackauckas

U.S. Representatives

- Lou Correa, U.S. Representative (D-CA-46)
- Darrell Issa, U.S. Representative (R-CA-49)
- Dana Rohrabacher U.S. Representative, (R-CA-48)
- Mimi Walters, U.S. Representative (R-CA-45)

State Senators

- Patricia Bates, State Senate Minority Leader (R-36)
- Janet Nguyen, State Senator (R-34)

State Assembly members

- Travis Allen, State Assemblyman (R-72)
- Tom Daly, State Assemblyman (D-69)
Todd Spitzer

Local-level officials

- Sam Allevato, former Mayor of San Juan Capistrano
- Neil Blais, former Mayor of Rancho Santa Margarita
- Gary Capata, former Mayor of Laguna Niguel
- Joe Carchio, former Mayor of Huntington Beach
- Alberta Christy, former Santa Ana City Councilwoman

Other individuals

- Ron Thomas, father of Kelly Thomas
- Paul Wilson, husband of Christy Lynn Wilson

Organizations

- Hispanic 100

=== Results ===
Orange County, California District Attorney election, 2018
Candidate	Votes	%
Tony Rackauckas (incumbent)	209,148	38.5%
Todd Spitzer	191,346	35.2%
Brett Murdock	121,818	22.4%
Lenore Albert-Sheridan	20,890	3.8%
Total votes	543,202	100.0%

=== Results by county supervisorial district ===
Rackauckas won all 5 county supervisorial districts by varying margins.

Results by county supervisorial district
District	Albert-Sheridan		Murdock		Rackauckas		Spitzer		Total
District	#	%	#	%	#	%	#	%	Total votes
1	3,234	4.9%	16,344	24.8%	25,840	39.3%	20,413	31.0%	65,831
2	5,432	4.1%	29,248	22.2%	53,591	40.7%	43,245	32.9%	131,516
3	4,000	3.4%	24,015	20.4%	44,835	38.1%	44,805	38.1%	117,655
4	3,602	4.1%	23,020	26.5%	31,140	35.8%	29,169	33.6%	86,931
5	4,622	3.3%	29,191	20.7%	53,742	38.0%	53,714	38.0%	141,269
Totals	20,890	3.8%	121,818	22.4%	209,148	38.5%	191,346	35.2%	543,202

== Runoff ==
=== Endorsements ===
Tony Rackauckas

U.S. Representatives

- Lou Correa, U.S. Representative (D-CA-46)
- Darrell Issa, U.S. Representative (R-CA-49)
- Dana Rohrabacher U.S. Representative, (R-CA-48)
- Mimi Walters, U.S. Representative (R-CA-45)

State Senators

- Patricia Bates, State Senate Minority Leader (R-36)
- Janet Nguyen, State Senator (R-34)

State Assembly members

- Travis Allen, State Assemblyman (R-72)
- Tom Daly, State Assemblyman (D-69)
Todd Spitzer

State-level officials

- Marilyn Brewer, former Assemblywoman

Local-level officials

- Sam Allevato, former Mayor of San Juan Capistrano
- Neil Blais, former Mayor of Rancho Santa Margarita
- Gary Capata, former Mayor of Laguna Niguel
- Joe Carchio, former Mayor of Huntington Beach
- Alberta Christy, former Santa Ana City Councilwoman
- Brett Murdock, former Mayor of Brea and candidate for Orange County District Attorney in 2018
- Shawn Nelson, Orange County Supervisor (District 4)
- Teresa Smith, Mayor of Orange

Other individuals

- Bill Handel, talk radio host
- John and Ken, talk radio co-hosts of The John and Ken Show
- Harriett Salarno, Chairwoman of Crime Victims United of California
- Nina Salarno, president of Crime Victims United of California
- Ron Thomas, father of Kelly Thomas
- Patricia Wenskunas, CEO of Crime Survivors
- Paul Wilson, husband of Christy Lynn Wilson

Organizations

- Crime Victims United of California
- Hispanic 100
- Orange County Professional Firefighters Association

Newspapers

- Orange County Register

=== Results ===
Orange County, California District Attorney election runoff, 2018
Candidate	Votes	%
Todd Spitzer	484,830	53.2%
Tony Rackauckas (incumbent)	425,764	46.8%
Total votes	910,594	100.0%

=== Results by county supervisorial district ===
Spitzer won all 5 county supervisorial districts.

Results by county supervisorial district
District	Rackauckas		Spitzer		Total
District	#	%	#	%	Total votes
1	61,297	49.7%	61,919	50.3%	123,216
2	103,969	49.7%	105,027	50.3%	208,996
3	89,739	44.5%	111,715	55.4%	201,454
4	66,350	44.7%	82,243	55.3%	148,593
5	104,409	45.7%	123,926	54.3%	228,335
Totals	425,764	46.8%	484,830	53.2%	910,594
