= Itzcoatl Ocampo =

Suspected Mexican-American serial killer

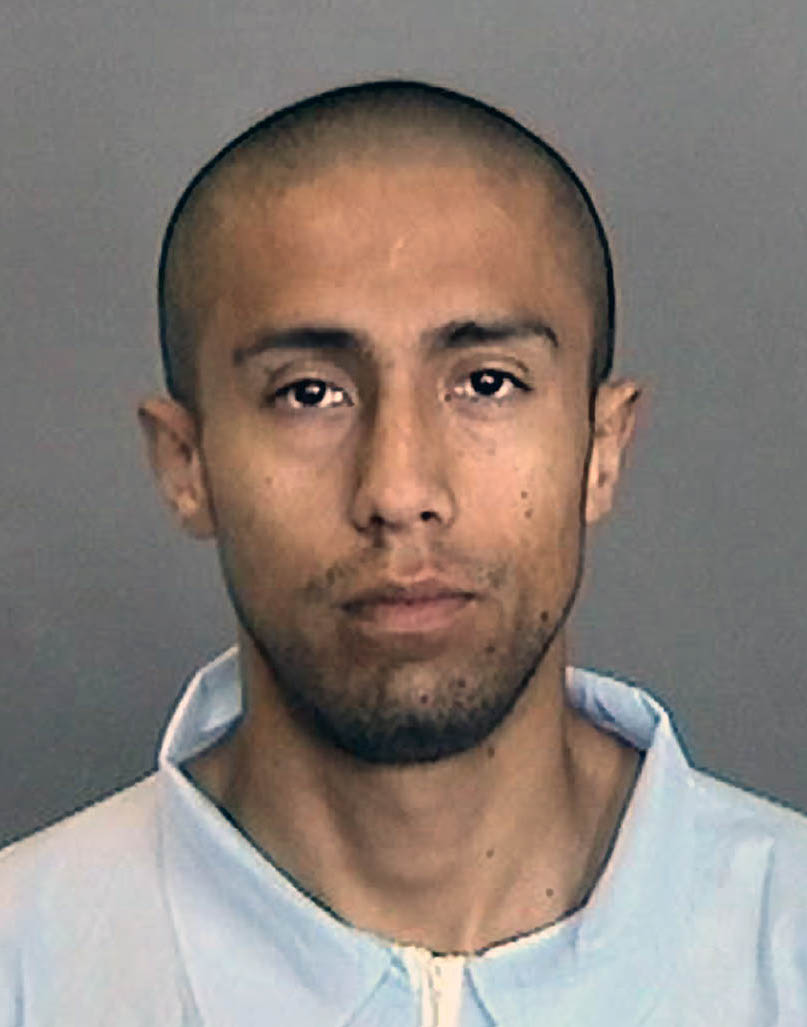
- Undated mugshot of Ocampo
- Born: Itzcoatl Misael Ocampo; March 20, 1988; Mexico City, Mexico
- Died: November 28, 2013 (aged 25); Santa Ana, California, U.S.
- Cause of death: Suicide by poisoning

Details
- Victims: 6+ (not convicted, died before trial)
- Span of crimes: 2011–2012
- Country: United States
- State: California
- Target: Primarily homeless men
- Date apprehended: January 13, 2012

Itzcoatl Misael Ocampo (March 20, 1988 – November 28, 2013) was a Mexican-American suspected serial killer and veteran assumed to be responsible for murdering at least six men, four of whom were homeless, in the Orange County, California, area from October 2011 to January 2012. Following his arrest, Ocampo was detained at the Orange County Jail, but on November 27, 2013, he ingested a large dose of Ajax, poisoning himself and losing consciousness. He was taken to a nearby hospital, where he died of acute intoxication the following day before he could be put on trial.

== Biography ==
Itzcoatl Ocampo was born on March 20, 1988, in Mexico City. He was the eldest in a family of three children. Shortly after his birth, his family emigrated to the United States, settling in Yorba Linda, California. His father, a qualified lawyer, found a job as a vacuum repair man and rented an apartment.

After living in the state for 12 years, Ocampo and the rest of his family went through all the legal procedures and obtained American citizenship. Ocampo attended Esperanza High School in Anaheim, graduating in 2006. During his school years, he was known as a friendly and approachable guy, thanks to which he befriended many and was popular among his peers. The September 11 attacks had a strong effect on the formation of his personality, as a result of which in subsequent years he became interested in politics. Ocampo supported the Republican Party and George W. Bush's foreign policies.

During his time at Esperanza High School, he was severely bullied for his height. He was jumped by several teens, for the lack of length in his jeans and contemptuously referred to as "High Waters" by classmates. After leaving school, Ocampo, along with several school friends enlisted in the United States Marine Corps. Since July 2006, he served at Camp Pendleton in Oceanside, where he was attached to the 15th Regiment, 1st Medical Battalion. In 2008, he was deployed with and attached to CLR-15, 1st Supply Battalion to Iraq, but did not partake in combat: his main responsibility was to provide transportation of water and fuel to the base of TQ. He spent eight months in the country, for which he was subsequently awarded the standard deployment awards; Iraq Campaign Medal, Global War on Terrorism Service Medal and the National Defense Service Medal. While in Iraq, Ocampo pointed his weapon at an ally and received a Non-Judicial Punishment, subsequently being demoted to PFC, reduction in pay, and was assigned extra duty assignments which included filling sandbags. After returning to the US, he was sent back to Camp Pendleton.

While at Camp Pendleton, Ocampo sustained a significant head trauma when the latch to his 7-ton failed to lock and slammed into the back of his head. During this period, as a result of the Great Recession, Ocampo was found not to be qualified for work. He applied at several locations, including McDonalds but eventually grudgingly settled for a landscaping job. Due to material difficulties, the family lost their homes with Ocampo's father's drug addiction causing his mother to divorce him, taking Ocampo and two of his siblings to stay with some relatives. In July 2010, Ocampo was Honorably Discharged and returned to Yorba Linda. Not long after returning from Iraq, he began to show signs of PTSD and exhibited deviant behavior. A serious factor for the deterioration of his mental state was the death of his close friend Patiño, who died on June 22, 2010, while fighting in Afghanistan's Helmand Province. Following his death, Ocampo became depressed, suffered from frequent headaches, hand tremors and alcohol abuse. Over the next two years, unable to adapt to a normal life and hold a job, he depended on income from relatives and refused treatment from psychiatrists. Ocampo felt he was unqualified to be diagnosed for PTSD because he did not fight in combat. By the end of 2011, his mental state had deteriorated sharply, to the point of developing hypochondria and showing signs of clinical delirium.

== Murders ==
On October 25, 2011, Ocampo came to the doorstep of his former classmate, 24-year-old Eder Herrera, where his mother, 53-year-old Raquel Estrada, and his older brother, 34-year-old Juan, were present at the time. During the visit, Ocampo unexpectedly lunged at them, stabbing both Raquel and Juan repeatedly, 30 and 60 times, respectively. The neighbors witnessed the murders, providing police with a description of the offender's appearance and his clothing. Because Herrera and Ocampo were similar in appearance, Herrera was arrested. Despite denying any involvement in the deaths of his mother and brother, he was still considered the main suspect, as it was revealed that shortly before the crime, he had gotten into an argument with them.

On the evening of December 21, Ocampo was loitering around the parking lot of a shopping center in Placentia, where he proceeded to attack a 53-year-old homeless man named James McGillivray, whom he stabbed to death. The event was recorded on CCTV, and the police managed to release an identikit of the suspect.

A week later, Ocampo committed another murder. The victim was 42-year-old vagrant Lloyd "Jim" Middaugh, who lived under a bridge crossing the Santa Ana River in Anaheim. Middaugh, like McGillivray, was fatally stabbed multiple times with a knife.

Two days later, Ocampo killed 57-year-old Paulus Smit, stabbing him more than 60 times and then discarding his body onto the parking lot of a public library in Yorba Linda.

By the time of the fourth murder, the news about homeless men being killed in Orange County spread in the Los Angeles media, leading police in several cities to enforce heavy duty patrols around homeless shelters and other areas where vagrants were known to reside. In early January 2012, several newspapers published a series of articles about the investigation into the killings: one, by the Los Angeles Times, interviewed a 64-year-old Vietnam War veteran named John Barry, who spoke extremely negatively about the perpetrator, and urged any potential victims to be as careful as they can in order to avoid being the next victim. As a result of Barry's interview, Ocampo travelled to Anaheim and began to stalk Barry, who notified police on January 12 after noticing Ocampo. He was asked to move into a homeless shelter, but refused to do so. The following evening, Ocampo found Barry near a Carl's Jr. in Anaheim. Upon locating him, Ocampo attacked and stabbed Barry in front of dozens of witnesses, fleeing on foot after killing him.

== Arrest ==
After killing Barry, a number of witnesses to the crime pursued Ocampo while others called the police. Ocampo tried to dispose of his bloodied clothing, but was arrested by the authorities about several hundred meters away from the crime scene without incident. When he was searched, a stainless steel knife with a 7-inch (17.7 cm) long blade was seized from him. Ocampo was taken to the police station, where he was charged with killing Barry based upon the available evidence. When he was investigated further, it was found that the murder weapon matched that used in the killings of the three homeless men, and Ocampo was additionally charged with their deaths as well. At a press conference, the Orange County District Attorney Tony Rackauckas confirmed that he would seek the death penalty for Ocampo in his upcoming trial.

On February 4, 2012, after analysing blood stains found on his shoes, Ocampo was linked to the Estrada-Herrera murders. He was charged with the double murder, and Herrera, who by then had been detained for three months in the county jail, was released.

His lawyer claimed Ocampo exhibited symptoms of psychosis, and was mentally unfit to stand trial. Ocampo's trial was scheduled to begin on January 17, 2014.

== Death ==
On the evening of November 27, 2013, Ocampo ingested several packets of Ajax cleaning detergent that he had been stocking for several weeks. He was pronounced dead the following day.

== See also ==
- List of serial killers in the United States
