= Bill Campbell (California politician) =

American politician (born 1942)

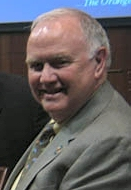

Chair of the Orange County Board of Supervisors
- In office January 11, 2011 – January 10, 2012
- Preceded by: Janet Nguyen
- Succeeded by: John Moorlach
- In office January 4, 2005 – January 9, 2007
- Preceded by: Thomas W. Wilson
- Succeeded by: Chris Norby

Vice Chair of the Orange County Board of Supervisors
- In office January 1, 2010 – January 11, 2011
- Preceded by: Janet Nguyen
- Succeeded by: John Moorlach

Member of the Orange County Board of Supervisors from the 3rd district
- In office February 4, 2003 – January 7, 2013
- Preceded by: Todd Spitzer
- Succeeded by: Todd Spitzer

Minority Leader of the California Assembly
- In office November 9, 2000 – March 26, 2001
- Preceded by: Scott Baugh
- Succeeded by: Dave Cox

Member of the California State Assembly from the 71st district
- In office December 2, 1996 – November 30, 2002
- Preceded by: Mickey Conroy
- Succeeded by: Todd Spitzer

Personal details
- Born: April 8, 1942 (age 83) Los Angeles, California, US
- Party: Republican
- Spouse: Mary (m. 1967)
- Children: 3
- Education: Loyola Marymount University; Harvard Business School

William James Campbell (born April 8, 1942) is a Republican politician from California. He was a California State Assemblyman from 1996–2002, Assembly Republican Leader from 2000–2001, and a member of the Orange County Board of Supervisors from 2003–2013.

== Early life and education ==
Born in Los Angeles, Campbell grew up in Pico Rivera. Campbell earned a Bachelor of Science in electrical engineering from Loyola Marymount University and a Master of Business Administration from the Harvard Business School.

== Career and politics ==
After initially working as an engineer, Campbell and his wife founded BIMA Corporation, a company that specialized in Taco Bell franchises.

In 1996, Campbell was elected to the represent eastern Orange County's 71st District in the State Assembly with 71% of the vote. He was re-elected with 69% of the vote in a three-way race in 1998 and 67% of the vote in a four-way race in 2000. Campbell served as Assembly Republican Leader from 2000 to 2001. During his time in the Assembly, he also served as Vice Chairman of the Appropriations Committee and was a member of the Banking and Finance Committee, the Education Committee, and the Utilities and Commerce Committee.

In 2002, Orange County Supervisor Todd Spitzer won 73% of the vote to replace the term-limited Campbell. Campbell, in turn, won 75% of the vote in the 2003 special election to fill the vacancy on the Board of Supervisors left when Spitzer resigned to become an Assemblyman. Both men suffered criticism for their apparent job swap, which required changing Orange County from a general law county to a charter county to allow an election to fill the supervisorial vacancy under the county charter instead of having then-Governor Gray Davis fill the vacancy by appointment under general law. However, this controversy seemed to have little effect on the election results, as 53% of County voters approved the creation of the charter and 3/4 of the voters supported the two men in their respective districts. Indeed, Campbell was unopposed for re-election to a full four-year term on the Board of Supervisors in 2004. In 2008, he won 80% of the vote in his bid for a second full four-year term. In 2012, Spitzer won 67% of the vote in his bid to return to the Board to replace the term-limited Campbell.

Campbell served as Chairman of the Board of Supervisors from January 4, 2005 – January 9, 2007 and from January 11, 2011 – January 10, 2012.

== Personal life ==
Campbell and his wife, Mary, have lived in Villa Park for over a quarter of a century. They have three adult sons, Patrick, Chris, and Brian, and five grandchildren.

California Assembly
Preceded by Mickey Conroy	California State Assemblyman; 71st District; December 2, 1996 – November 30, 2002	Succeeded by Todd Spitzer
Party political offices
Preceded by Scott Baugh	Minority Leader of the California State Assembly; November 9, 2000 – March 26, 2001	Succeeded by Dave Cox
Political offices
Preceded by Todd Spitzer	Orange County Supervisor; 3rd District; February 4, 2003 – January 7, 2013	Succeeded by Todd Spitzer
Political offices
Preceded by Thomas W. Wilson	Chair of the Orange County Board of Supervisors; January 8, 2008 - January 13, 2009; January 11, 2011 – January 12, 2012	Succeeded by Chris Norby
Preceded by Janet Nguyen	Chair of the Orange County Board of Supervisors; January 8, 2008 - January 13, 2009; January 11, 2011 – January 12, 2012	Succeeded by John Moorlach
Preceded by Janet Nguyen	Vice Chair of the Orange County Board of Supervisors; January 1, 2010 – January 11, 2011	Succeeded by John Moorlach
