= Todd Spitzer =

American politician and lawyer

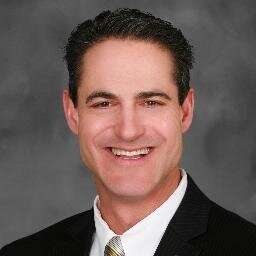

22nd District Attorney of Orange County
- Incumbent
- Assumed office January 7, 2019
- Preceded by: Tony Rackauckas

Chair of the Orange County Board of Supervisors
- In office January 13, 2015 – January 12, 2016
- Preceded by: Shawn Nelson
- Succeeded by: Lisa Bartlett

Vice Chair of the Orange County Board of Supervisors
- In office November 25, 2014 – January 13, 2015
- Preceded by: Patricia C. Bates
- Succeeded by: Lisa Bartlett

Member of the Orange County Board of Supervisors from the 3rd district
- In office January 7, 2013 – January 7, 2019
- Preceded by: Bill Campbell
- Succeeded by: Don Wagner
- In office January 6, 1997 – November 19, 2002
- Preceded by: Donald Saltarelli
- Succeeded by: Bill Campbell

Member of the California State Assembly from the 71st district
- In office December 2, 2002 – November 30, 2008
- Preceded by: Bill Campbell
- Succeeded by: Jeff Miller

Personal details
- Born: Todd Allan Spitzer; November 26, 1960 (age 65) Whittier, California, U.S.
- Party: Republican
- Spouse: Jamie Morris
- Children: 2
- Education: University of California, Los Angeles (BA); University of California, Berkeley (MPP); University of California, Hastings (JD)

Todd Allan Spitzer (born November 26, 1960) is an American attorney and politician serving as the district attorney of Orange County, California. He was elected district attorney in 2018, defeating incumbent Tony Rackauckas. Spitzer previously served as a deputy district attorney from 1990 to 1996 and as an Assistant District Attorney from 2008 to 2010.

Spitzer was previously an Orange County supervisor from 1997 to 2002 and again from 2012 to 2018. When elected in the aftermath of the 1994 Orange County bankruptcy, Spitzer emphasized restoring fiscal stability during his term on the Board of Supervisors.

He was also a member of the California State Assembly from 2002 to 2006, serving three terms representing California's 71st assembly district. As an assemblyman, he co-wrote California's Megan's Law. He also served as spokesman and campaign manager for the successful campaign to pass Marsy's Law in a 2008 initiative.

In 2024 Spitzer served as the Orange County chair for Proposition 36, a statewide initiative to modify Proposition 47 concerning drug and theft offenses. The measure passed statewide with about 60 percent of the vote and approximately 70 percent in Orange County.

In 2026, as District Attorney, Spitzer negotiated the largest civil settlement as the leader of a government agency in Orange County history at $125 million. This case against GKN industry involved its failure to maintain safety measures in its use of on-site chemical storage for its manufacturing process of aircraft windows. Spitzer recovered $100 million for victims, $10 million for the first responder services and $15 million in civil fines for future environmental prosecution enforcement.

Spitzer created the first ever California hate crimes portal for anyone to report a hate crime or incident making it clear: "I do not care who you love, but I care who you hate."

== Early life and education ==
Todd Spitzer was born on November 26, 1960, in Whittier, California, to Phyllis Ann (née Kirschenbaum) and Leonard Spitzer. He has a sister, Susan, who also went on to be an attorney. He played leading roles in the Schurr High School department of performance arts' productions of the musicals Hello, Dolly! (1975) and Li'l Abner (1976).

Spitzer attended the University of California, Los Angeles, graduating with a bachelor's degree in 1982. He then completed a fellowship at the California State Senate. In 1984–85, Spitzer worked as an English teacher at Theodore Roosevelt High School in the Los Angeles Unified School District. He graduated in 1989 with a master's degree in public policy from the University of California, Berkeley, and a Juris Doctor from the University of California, Hastings College of the Law. While at Hastings, Spitzer was awarded the George Moscone Fellowship, given to law students dedicating their careers to public service.

== Career ==
=== Early career ===
Spitzer joined the Orange County District Attorney's office in 1990 as deputy district attorney. He served in the position until 1996.

From 1990 to 2000, Spitzer also served as a volunteer reserve police officer in the Los Angeles Police Department. Spitzer's first elected office was as a trustee to the Brea Olinda School Board in 1992. Serving in the position until 1996, he investigated a grading scandal at Brea Olinda High School involving a former registrar changing students' grades to enhance their chances of getting into college.

=== Orange County Board of Supervisors ===
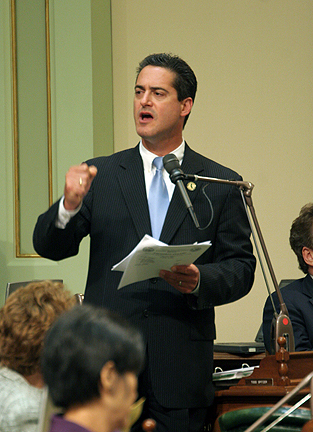
Spitzer speaking at the California budget bill signing on June 6, 2004.

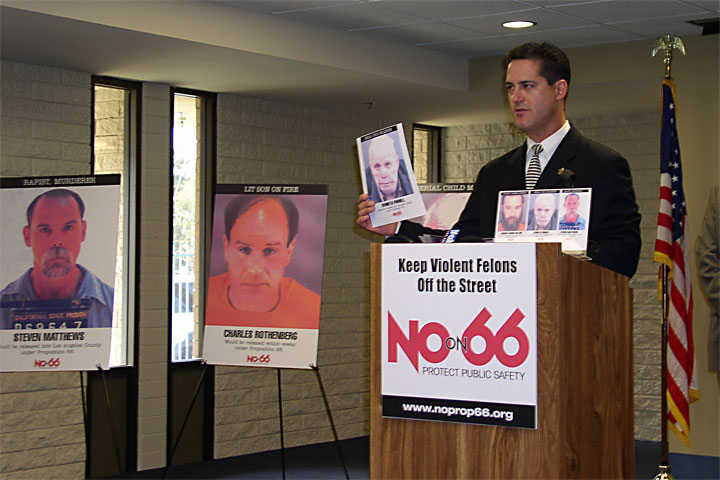
Spitzer speaking on the "No on Proposition 66" campaign on June 20, 2004.

In 1996, Spitzer ran against Assemblyman Mickey Conroy in a heated election for the 3rd supervisorial district seat on the Orange County Board of Supervisors. Described by Los Angeles Times as "a decided underdog", Spitzer came in second in the March 1996 primary among seven candidates, leading to a general election between him and Conroy. Spitzer won the general election and was sworn-in in January 1997.

While on the board, Spitzer opposed proposals to convert the Marine Corps Air Station El Toro into an international airport and instead promoted a “Millennium Plan” for mixed-use commercial and residential redevelopment of the 4,700-acre (1,900-hectare) property. Spitzer also advocated for the immediate release of a map of registered sex offenders living in Orange County.

=== California State Assembly ===
In 2002, Spitzer ran for a seat in the California State Assembly to represent the 71st assembly district. He was challenged by the Democratic candidate Bea Foster, a teacher from Santa Ana. After defeating Foster in the election, Spitzer was sworn into the State Assembly on December 2, 2002.

As an assemblyman, Spitzer served on the judiciary and public safety committees. In April 2004, he co-wrote Megan's Law to publish the registered sex offenders database on the Internet.

Spitzer was re-elected to the State Assembly in November 2004, defeating Bea Foster again with a vote margin of 69.1% to 30.9%. In 2006, Spitzer served as co-chair of the High Risk Sex Offender Task Force, formed by Governor Arnold Schwarzenegger to review the law governing the monitoring of high risk sex offenders living in California. He also advocated for the passage of Proposition 83, a law against sexual predators based on Jessica's Law. He also helped write Marsy's Law, an amendment to the state's constitution to expand the legal rights of victims of crime which was passed in 2008. He served as spokesperson and campaign manager for the initiative to pass the amendment. Spitzer later served as legal affairs director of Marsy's Law for All, an organization representing victims of crime.

=== Return to Orange County District Attorney's office ===
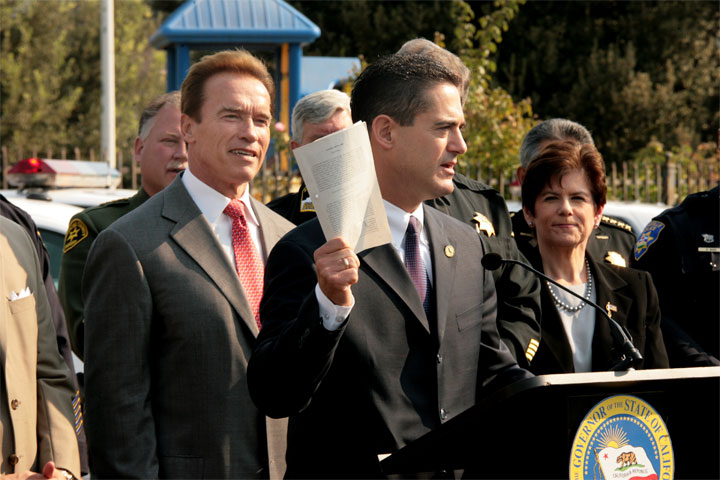
Spitzer in 2007 speaks out against the early release of state prisoners with Governor Arnold Schwarzenegger and San Diego County District Attorney Bonnie Dumanis.

A June 2004 Los Angeles Times article described a "long-simmering feud between Orange County [District Attorney] Tony Rackauckas and [...] Spitzer." In October 2004, Spitzer accused Rackauckas of "[poisoning] trust in local law enforcement". According to OC Weekly, in 2004, Spitzer was not only running for re-election to the State Assembly, he was privately seeking advice, support, and building a campaign to challenge Rackauckas in 2006. Spitzer eventually decided not to run and instead reached an agreement with Rackauckas to become a prosecutor and run in the 2014 election with Rackauckas's blessing.

In 2008, Rackauckas appointed Spitzer as assistant district attorney. As a prosecutor in Orange County, Spitzer handled criminal matters and supervised line prosecutors. He was fired two years later in 2010. Rackauckas said that he fired Spitzer for inappropriate behavior in the workplace and intimidating other workers. Spitzer was inquiring for information from the Orange County Public Administrator and Public Guardian, John Williams, at the behest of a domestic violence victim. According to the news website Voice of OC, the fact that Rackauckas's fiancée, Peggy Buff, was Williams's deputy further fueled the controversy. By this point, Spitzer had also indicated his intention to run in the 2014 District Attorney election but Rackauckas announced that he planned "to run for another term in 2014 to stop [him]". Spitzer returned to private practice and prepared to run for a Board of Supervisors seat in 2012.

=== Re-election to the Orange County Board of Supervisors ===
In June 2012, Spitzer beat Deborah Pauly, a fellow Republican, to again become a member of the Orange County Board of Supervisors, serving the same 3rd supervisorial district he had represented from 1997 to 2002.

During Spitzer’s second term, his long-running rivalry with District Attorney Tony Rackauckas continued to draw media attention. Coverage in local outlets described tension between the two offices amid speculation that Spitzer might again challenge Rackauckas in a future election.

=== Orange County District Attorney ===
Spitzer challenged Rackauckas in the 2018 Orange County District Attorney election. The first round was held in June 2018 with Spitzer receiving 35% of the vote to Rackauckas's 38%, leading to a second round. On November 6, 2018, Spitzer received 53.2% of the vote to win against the incumbent. Replacing Rackauckas who had held the position since 1999, Spitzer became the county's first new district attorney in 20 years when he was sworn in on January 7, 2019.

Spitzer campaigned on reforming the district attorney’s office following controversies under his predecessor. Spitzer inherited a United States Department of Justice Civil Rights Division investigation against Rackauckas which began in 2016. In December 2024, Spitzer settled that threat of litigation with the US DOJ and was commended by Assistant Attorney General Kristen Clarke of the Justice Department’s Civil Rights Division who said in a statement: “We commend the District Attorney [Spitzer] and his staff for initiating corrective action at OCDA to comply with constitutional requirements. The District Attorney’s proactive efforts, together with today’s agreement, will not only protect the constitutional rights of individual defendants; they will also help restore the public’s confidence in the fundamental fairness of the criminal justice system in Orange County.” Spitzer went on to say: “I am incredibly proud of the work that we as a team have done over the last six years to implement the positive, sustained reforms necessary to prevent the sins of the past administration. This work is a clear reflection on our continuing dedication to the just, honest, and ethical administration of the law. I am grateful for the partnership of the U.S. Department of Justice and its recognition of our unrelenting proactive approach to addressing these issues and safeguarding against violations of the United States Constitution. The rule of law must be followed without exception,” Spitzer added. “Without it there can be no trust and there can be no justice. Today marks a significant achievement in restoring the public trust.”

One of Rackauckas' former homicide prosecutors, whom Spitzer fired was found by the California Superior Court to have engaged in prosecutorial misconduct and being untruthful under oath. The Court dismissed the Special Circumstances charge while allowing Spitzer, as the current District Attorney, to re-try the defendant for murder. The Court held that Spitzer and his assigned prosecutor was highly cooperative and ethical during these review proceedings. Spitzer commented: “The judge chose the appropriate remedy because of outrageous governmental conduct on the part of Ebrahim Baytieh,” Spitzer said. “The court specifically found he was not truthful under oath. I fired him because he lied to the (U.S.) Department of Justice and he was untrustworthy as a prosecutor.”

As District Attorney, Spitzer has criticized the moratorium on the death penalty in California, ordered by Governor Gavin Newsom in March 2019. Spitzer has held press conferences with the families of murder victims whose convicted murderers are serving time on death row. In 2020, he was one of the several county district attorneys that prosecuted Joseph James DeAngelo (also known as the Golden State Killer) who pleaded guilty and was sentenced to life in prison without parole. During the sentencing hearing on August 21, Spitzer agreed to a plea deal after meeting with the victims and their families.

In response to Governor Newsom's 2026 blanket commutation of more than 500 condemned Death Row inmate sentences, Spitzer led California's prosecutors and filed multiple Writs in the California Supreme Court to block such actions. Citing multiple violations of the State Constitution and state law, Spitzer was the first case the Supreme Court ordered the State's Solicitor General to respond. Spitzer expressly refuted Newsom's false claim that these condemned inmates would never get out of prison and would suffer Life Without the Possibility of Parole; instead Spitzer documented recent cases of LWOPs being released from prison and the Legislature's repeated attempts to convert LWOP to parole eligible offenses.

During his 2018 campaign for District Attorney, Spitzer had criticized his predecessor's genetic surveillance program, whereby the county uses minor offenses to collect and expand its own DNA database, saying that the program can possibly be abused. When he became District Attorney in January 2019, Spitzer reviewed the program and authorized its continuation. The local database has over 200,000 voluntarily given DNA samples and has been used to solve many other serious and violent felonies that would have most likely gone unsolved. A lawsuit filed against the program was dismissed in June 2021 by Judge William D. Claster of the Orange County Superior Court.

In 2025 Spitzer’s office prosecuted former Orange County Superior Court Judge Jeffrey Ferguson for the murder of his wife, Sheryl Ferguson. After a mistrial, a second jury found Ferguson guilty, and he was sentenced to 35 years to life in prison on September 17, 2025.

District Attorney Todd Spitzer continues to be the leading national spokesperson about Chilean nationals burglaries and has been working with the FBI and Congress to get the Secretary of State and Secretary of Homeland Security to end the ESTA Visa program with the Country of Chile for its failure to conduct criminal background checks before allowing Chileans into the United States. As a result, thousands of Americans have had their homes burglarized and professional athletes have been specifically targeted because of their wealth.

== Personal life ==
In mid 2009, Spitzer, whose mother had died the year before from colon cancer, was himself diagnosed with laryngeal cancer. He underwent successful radiation therapy treatment at the UC Irvine Medical Center and has said that he "never missed a day of work."

Spitzer is married to Jamie Morris Spitzer who serves as Associate Chief Judge at the Workers' Compensation Appeals Board. They have a son and a daughter.

== Awards and recognition ==
Spitzer was voted Outstanding Prosecutor by the Orange County District Attorney's office in 1994 and the local chapter of Mothers Against Drunk Driving honored him with its Outstanding Prosecutor Award in 1996.

Spitzer serves as an honorary board member of the Doris Tate Crime Victims Bureau (renamed Crime Victims Action Alliance) and as a board member of Crime Survivors, Inc., and the Orange County's Trauma Intervention Program (TIP). He also served as a member of the Orange County Bar Association Administration of Justice Committee. He was on the advisory board for the Orange County Council of the Boy Scouts of America, along with California assemblyman James Silva, and former assembly member Van Tran. In 2003, he received that organization's Visionary Award, given annually to a person who exemplifies the attributes of the Scout Oath and Law, and who has demonstrated leadership and philanthropy in the Hispanic and Latino communities. Mothers Against Drunk Drivers, Southern California, has honored Spitzer as one of its California Advisory Board Members.

In 2007, Spitzer was inducted into the Schurr High School Hall of Fame.

== Electoral history ==
=== Orange County, California District Attorney ===
Orange County, California District Attorney election, 2018
Party	Candidate	Votes	%
Republican	Tony Rackauckas (incumbent)	209,148	38.5%
Republican	Todd Spitzer	191,346	35.2%
Democratic	Brett Murdock	121,818	22.4%
Democratic	Lenore Albert-Sheridan	20,890	3.8%
Total votes		543,202	100.0%

Orange County, California District Attorney election runoff, 2018
Party	Candidate	Votes	%
Republican	Todd Spitzer	484,830	53.2%
Republican	Tony Rackauckas (incumbent)	425,764	46.8%
Total votes		910,594	100.0%

2022 Orange County, California District Attorney election
Party	Candidate	Votes	%
Republican	Todd Spitzer (incumbent)	352,415	62.5%
Democratic	Pete Hardin	119,886	21.3%
No party preference	Bryan Chehock	46,425	8.2%
Republican	Michael A. Jacobs	45,190	8.0%
Total votes		563,916	100.0%

Political offices
Preceded by Donald Saltarelli	Orange County Supervisor; 3rd District; January 6, 1997 – November 19, 2002	Succeeded by Bill Campbell
Preceded by Bill Campbell	California State Assemblyman; 71st District; December 2, 2002 - November 30, 2008	Succeeded by Jeff Miller
Preceded by Shawn Nelson	Orange County Chair; January 7, 2013 – January 7, 2019	Succeeded by Lisa Bartlett
Preceded by Patricia C. Bates	Orange County Vice Chair; January 7, 2013 – January 7, 2019	Succeeded by Lisa Bartlett
Preceded by Bill Campbell	Orange County Supervisor; 3rd District; January 7, 2013 – January 7, 2019	Succeeded by Don Wagner
Preceded by Tony Rackauckas	District Attorney of Orange County, California; January 7, 2019 – present	Incumbent
