= Pinyon Pines, California =

Unincorporated community in California, United States

Coordinates: 33°35′22″N 116°27′10″W

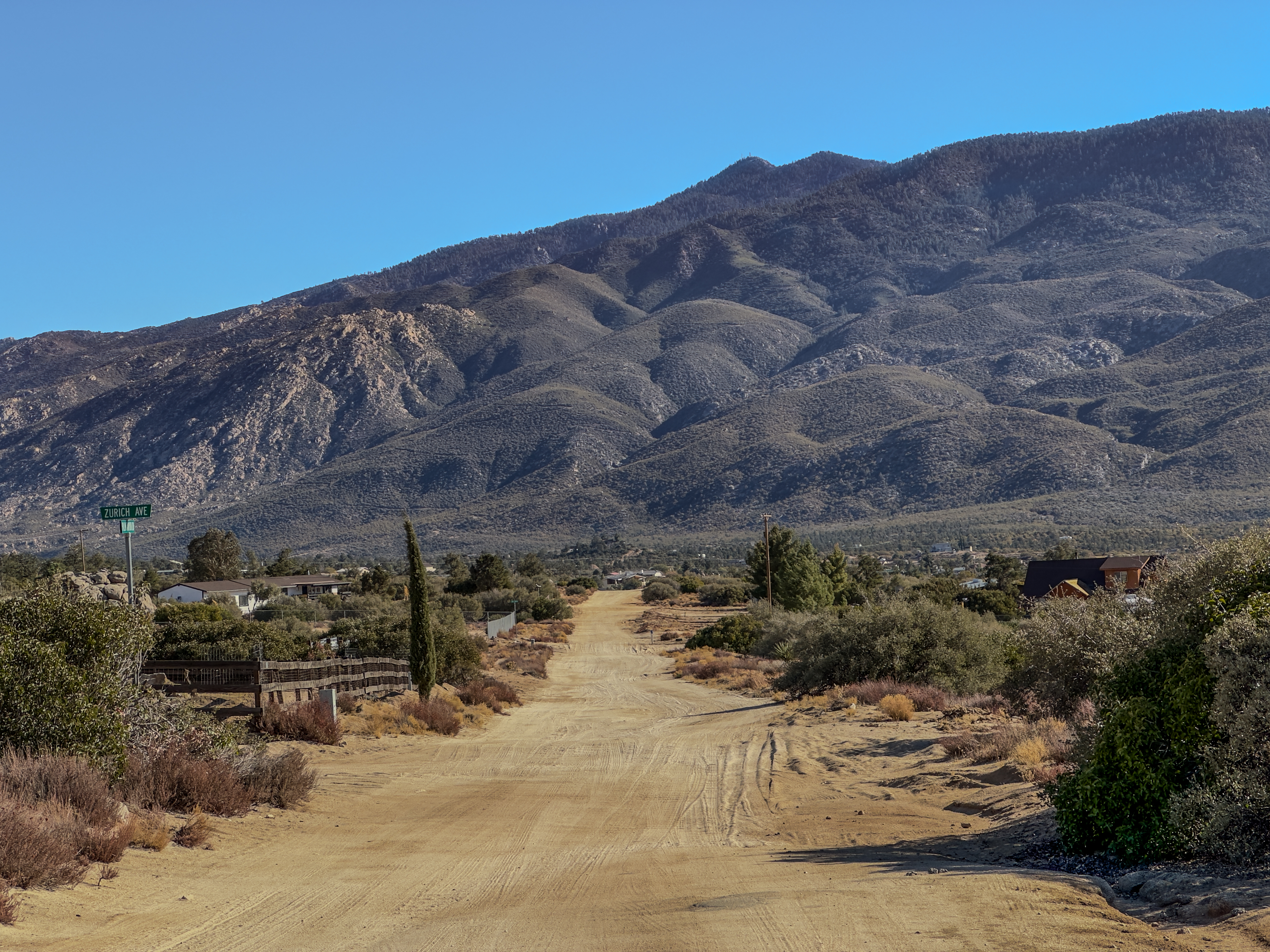
- A view of Toro Peak from Palm Canyon Drive
- Interactive map of Pinyon Pines, California
- Country: United States
- State: California
- County: Riverside
- Time zone: PST
  - Summer (DST): PDT
- ZIP code: 92561
- Area code: 760

Pinyon Pines is an unincorporated community in Riverside County, California.

== Geography ==
It is located in a small valley between the San Jacinto Mountains and Santa Rosa Mountains, north of State Route 74. It takes its name from the Pinyon pine (Pinus monophylla) trees native to the area. Pinyon Pines sits at an elevation of approximately 4000 feet.

== Government ==
Pinyon Pines is in:

- California's 25th congressional district, currently represented by House Representative Raul Ruiz.
- California's 28th State Senate district, currently represented by State Senator Jeff Stone.
- California's 71st State Assembly district, currently represented by Assemblymember Randy Voepel.

== History ==
Pinyon Pines was founded by Art Nightingale in the 1930s, around the time that the Pines to Palms Highway was being constructed. A mechanic by trade, he invested in the Pinyon Flats area. He built accommodations for the workers of the highway, and also built the Sugarloaf Cafe, now since closed.

Pinyon Pines was the site of a 2006 triple homicide that made national attention. Residents 53-year-old Vicki Friedli and her 55-year-old boyfriend, Jon Hayward, were found shot, and Friedl's 18-year-old daughter, Becky, was found outside in a wheelbarrow, burned so badly investigators were unable to determine cause of death. Two men were indicted in March 2014, but the charges were later dismissed. The two men have since been arrested again. On August 10, 2018, a jury found Robert Pape, 30, and Cristin Smith, 29, guilty and sentenced both to life in prison without the possibility of parole.
