= California's 71st State Assembly district =

American legislative district

Current assemblymember
Kate Sanchez; R–Trabuco Canyon
- Population (2010) • Voting age • Citizen voting age: 462,584; 350,857; 299,471
- Demographics: 63.94% White; 4.69% Black; 24.06% Latino; 4.35% Asian; 1.51% Native American; 0.62% Hawaiian/Pacific Islander; 0.25% other; 0.56% remainder of multiracial
- Registered voters: 271,526
- Registration: 40.57% Republican; 29.78% Democratic; 22.89% No party preference

California's 71st State Assembly district is one of 80 California State Assembly districts. It is currently represented by Republican Kate Sanchez.

== District profile ==
The district encompasses much of San Diego County's backcountry and East County regions, as well as a primarily mountainous southwestern portion of Riverside County. While most of the district's area consists of rural mountain country and desert, much of the population is clustered in the suburban southwestern part near San Diego.

Riverside County – 1.9%

- Aguanga
- Anza
- Fern Valley
- Idyllwild
- Mountain Center
- Pine Cove
- Pinyon Pines
- Sage
- Valle Vista

San Diego County – 13.6%

- Alpine
- Borrego Springs
- Descanso
- El Cajon
- Eucalyptus Hills
- Granite Hills
- Harbison Canyon
- Jacumba Hot Springs
- Jamul
- Julian
- La Presa – partial
- Lakeside
- Ramona
- Rancho San Diego
- San Diego Country Estates
- Santee
- Spring Valley
- Winter Gardens

== Election results from statewide races ==
Year	Office	Results
2021	Recall	Yes 58.9 – 41.1%
2020	President	Trump 55.6 – 42.1%
2018	Governor	Cox 60.9 – 39.1%
2018	Senator	de Leon 51.4 – 48.6%
2016	President	Trump 56.3 – 38.2%
2016	Senator	Harris 54.6 – 45.4%
2014	Governor	Kashkari 63.8 – 36.2%
2012	President	Romney 58.5 – 36.8%
2012	Senator	Emken 58.9 – 41.1%

== List of assembly members representing the district ==
Due to redistricting, the 71st district has been moved around different parts of the state. The current iteration resulted from the 2021 redistricting by the California Citizens Redistricting Commission.

Assembly members	Party	Years served	Counties represented	Notes
Eleazer L. DeWitt	Democratic	January 5, 1885 – January 3, 1887	Tulare	
A. B. Butler	Republican	January 3, 1887 – January 7, 1889	Tulare	
George S. Berry	Democratic	January 7, 1889 – January 5, 1891	Tulare	
William Spurgeon Cunningham	Democratic	January 5, 1891 – January 2, 1893	Tulare	
Samuel Newell Androus	Republican	January 2, 1893 – January 7, 1895	Los Angeles	
Orlando H. Huber	Republican	January 7, 1895 – January 4, 1897	Los Angeles	
J. O. Vosburg	Republican	January 4, 1897 – January 2, 1899	Los Angeles	
Orlando H. Huber	Republican	January 2, 1899 – January 1, 1901	Los Angeles	
Howard A. Broughton	Republican	January 1, 1901 – January 5, 1903	Los Angeles	
Philip A. Stanton	Republican	January 5, 1903 – January 2, 1911	Los Angeles	
Lyman Farwell	Republican	January 2, 1911 – January 6, 1913	Los Angeles	
Elijah A. Emmons	Republican	January 6, 1913 – January 4, 1915	Los Angeles	
Lewis A. Spengler	Socialist	January 4, 1915 – January 8, 1917	Los Angeles	
Bert L. Farmer	Republican	January 8, 1917 – January 6, 1919	Los Angeles	
Henry E. Carter	Republican	January 6, 1919 – January 3, 1921	Los Angeles	
E. O. Loucks	Republican	January 3, 1921 – January 8, 1923	Los Angeles	
Henry E. Carter	Republican	January 8, 1923 – January 7, 1929	Los Angeles	
Frank McGinley	Republican	January 7, 1929 – January 5, 1931	Los Angeles	
Harry B. Riley	Republican	January 5, 1931 – January 4, 1937	Los Angeles	
Paul Peek	Democratic	January 4, 1937 – February 29, 1940	Los Angeles	Resigned from office.
Vacant		February 29, 1940 – January 6, 1941	Los Angeles	
Frederick N. Howser	Republican	January 6, 1941 – February 2, 1943	Los Angeles	Resigned from office to become District Attorney of Los Angeles County.
Vacant		February 2, 1943 – January 8, 1945	Los Angeles	
Carl Fletcher	Democratic	January 8, 1945 – January 8, 1951	Los Angeles	
Herbert R. Klocksiem	Republican	January 8, 1951 – January 5, 1953	Los Angeles	
Leland Milton Backstrand	Republican	January 5, 1953 – January 2, 1961	Riverside	
Gordon Cologne	Republican	January 2, 1961 – January 7, 1963	Riverside	
Robert Badham	Republican	January 7, 1963 – November 30, 1974	Orange	
Paul B. Carpenter	Democratic	December 2, 1974 – November 30, 1976	Orange	
Chester B. Wray	Democratic	December 6, 1976 – November 30, 1982	Orange	
Doris Allen	Republican	December 6, 1982 – November 30, 1992	Orange	
Mickey Conroy	Republican	December 7, 1992 – November 30, 1996	Orange	
Bill Campbell	Republican	December 2, 1996 – November 30, 2002	Orange	
Todd Spitzer	Republican	December 2, 2002 – November 30, 2008	Orange, Riverside	
Jeff Miller	Republican	December 1, 2008 – November 30, 2012	Orange, Riverside	
Brian Jones	Republican	December 3, 2012 – November 30, 2016	Riverside, San Diego	
Randy Voepel	Republican	December 5, 2016 – November 30, 2022	Riverside, San Diego	
Kate Sanchez	Republican	December 5, 2022 – present	Orange, Riverside	

== Election results (1990–present) ==
=== 2024 ===
2024 California State Assembly 71st district election
Primary election
Party	Candidate	Votes	%
Republican	Kate Sanchez (incumbent)	71,079	63.1
Democratic	Gary Kephart	38,610	34.3
Peace and Freedom	Babar Khan	2,912	2.6
Total votes		112,601	100.0
General election
Republican	Kate Sanchez (incumbent)	147,932	61.5
Democratic	Gary Kephart	92,424	38.5
Total votes		240,356	100.0
Republican hold			

=== 2022 ===
2022 California State Assembly 71st district election
Primary election
Party	Candidate	Votes	%
Republican	Matt Rahn	41,943	51.7
Republican	Kate Sanchez	39,143	48.2
Democratic	Albia Cooper Miller (write-in)	58	0.1
Total votes		81,145	100.0
General election
Republican	Kate Sanchez	75,603	51.3
Republican	Matt Rahn	71,730	48.7
Total votes		147,333	100.0
Republican hold			

=== 2020 ===
2020 California State Assembly 71st district election
Primary election
Party	Candidate	Votes	%
Republican	Randy Voepel (incumbent)	77,069	61.1
Democratic	Liz "Elizabeth" Lavertu	49,073	38.9
Total votes		126,142	100.0
General election
Republican	Randy Voepel (incumbent)	136,163	59.6
Democratic	Liz "Elizabeth" Lavertu	92,392	40.4
Total votes		228,555	100.0
Republican hold			

=== 2018 ===
2018 California State Assembly 71st district election
Primary election
Party	Candidate	Votes	%
Republican	Randy Voepel (incumbent)	41,561	43.6
Democratic	James Elia	30,672	32.2
Republican	Larry A. Wilske	23,106	24.2
Total votes		95,339	100.0
General election
Republican	Randy Voepel (incumbent)	100,386	60.6
Democratic	James Elia	65,194	39.4
Total votes		165,580	100.0
Republican hold			

=== 2016 ===
2016 California State Assembly 71st district election
Primary election
Party	Candidate	Votes	%
Republican	Randy Voepel	51,857	59.9
Republican	Leo Hamel	23,990	27.7
Republican	Tony Teora	10,770	12.4
Total votes		86,617	100.0
General election
Republican	Randy Voepel	108,049	65.8
Republican	Leo Hamel	56,184	34.2
Total votes		164,233	100.0
Republican hold			

=== 2014 ===
2014 California State Assembly 71st district election
Primary election
Party	Candidate	Votes	%
Republican	Brian Jones (incumbent)	40,326	76.1
Republican	Tony Teora	12,573	23.7
Democratic	Howard L. Katz (write-in)	109	0.2
Total votes		53,008	100.0
General election
Republican	Brian Jones (incumbent)	64,613	70.6
Republican	Tony Teora	26,935	29.4
Total votes		91,548	100.0
Republican hold			

=== 2012 ===
2012 California State Assembly 71st district election
Primary election
Party	Candidate	Votes	%
Republican	Brian Jones (incumbent)	36,424	46.7
Democratic	Patrick J. Hurley	23,510	30.2
Republican	John McLaughlin	17,987	23.1
Total votes		77,921	100.0
General election
Republican	Brian Jones (incumbent)	106,663	63.1
Democratic	Patrick J. Hurley	62,330	36.9
Total votes		168,993	100.0
Republican hold			

=== 2010 ===
2010 California State Assembly 71st district election
Party	Candidate	Votes	%
Republican	Jeff Miller (incumbent)	97,158	66.2
Democratic	Gary Kephart	49,792	33.8
Total votes		146,950	100.0
Republican hold			

=== 2008 ===
2008 California State Assembly 71st district election
Party	Candidate	Votes	%
Republican	Jeff Miller	149,166	100.0
Total votes		149,166	100.0
Republican hold			

=== 2006 ===
2006 California State Assembly 71st district election
Party	Candidate	Votes	%
Republican	Todd Spitzer (incumbent)	83,645	71.6
Democratic	Irene LaChance	33,135	28.4
Total votes		116,780	100.0
Republican hold			

=== 2004 ===
2004 California State Assembly 71st district election
Party	Candidate	Votes	%
Republican	Todd Spitzer (incumbent)	120,657	69.1
Democratic	Bea Foster	54,041	30.9
Total votes		174,698	100.0
Republican hold			

=== 2002 ===
2002 California State Assembly 71st district election
Party	Candidate	Votes	%
Republican	Todd Spitzer	69,764	73.1
Democratic	Bea Foster	25,770	26.9
Total votes		95,534	100.0
Republican hold			

=== 2000 ===
2000 California State Assembly 71st district election
Party	Candidate	Votes	%
Republican	William J. Campbell (incumbent)	120,852	66.5
Democratic	Bea Foster	51,978	28.6
Natural Law	Brenda Jo Bryant	5,137	2.8
Libertarian	Brian Lee Cross	3,891	2.1
Total votes		181,858	100.0
Republican hold			

=== 1998 ===
1998 California State Assembly 71st district election
Party	Candidate	Votes	%
Republican	William J. Campbell (incumbent)	89,193	69.1
Democratic	Martha Badger	36,299	28.1
Natural Law	Brenda Jo Bryant	3,517	2.7
Total votes		129,009	100.0
Republican hold			

=== 1996 ===
1996 California State Assembly 71st district election
Party	Candidate	Votes	%
Republican	William J. Campbell	107,783	70.6
Democratic	Jack Roberts	44,848	29.4
Total votes		152,631	100.0
Republican hold			

=== 1994 ===
1994 California State Assembly 71st district election
Party	Candidate	Votes	%
Republican	Mickey Conroy (incumbent)	92,908	71.8
Democratic	Jeanne Costales	36,458	28.2
Total votes		129,366	100.0
Republican hold			

=== 1992 ===
1992 California State Assembly 71st district election
Party	Candidate	Votes	%
Republican	Mickey Conroy (incumbent)	97,714	61.8
Democratic	Ben Foster	60,279	38.2
Total votes		157,993	100.0
Republican hold			

=== 1990 ===
1990 California State Assembly 71st district election
Party	Candidate	Votes	%
Republican	Doris Allen (incumbent)	48,923	60.5
Democratic	Peter Mathews	31,935	39.5
Total votes		80,858	100.0
Republican hold			

== See also ==
- California State Assembly
- California State Assembly districts
- Districts in California
