= Chester B. Wray =

American politician

Member of the California State Assembly from the 71st district
- In office December 6, 1976 - November 30, 1982
- Preceded by: Paul B. Carpenter
- Succeeded by: Doris Allen

Personal details
- Born: May 23, 1923 Searcy, Arkansas, US
- Died: December 28, 2005 (aged 82) Rocklin, California, US
- Party: Democratic
- Spouse: Mary Hampton Wray (1943-1998) Cleo Wray (2002-2006)
- Children: 4
- Education: University of California, Los Angeles
- Profession: Auto worker

Chester B. "Chet" Wray (May 26, 1923 – December 28, 2005) was a Democratic politician who represented Orange County in the California State Assembly from 1976 to 1982.

== Life and education ==
Wray was born on May 26, 1923, in Searcy, Arkansas. Before moving his wife, Mary, and their four children to California in 1954, he took classes at the University of Arkansas and later attended UCLA, where he studied political science. He and his family later moved to California, where he became the president of the United Auto Workers union.

Wray died of Parkinson's disease on December 28, 2005, at his home in Rocklin, California.

=== Political career ===
Wray first ran for election in 1976, for the 71st Assembly District in Orange County. Running as a Democrat in predominantly Republican Orange County, Wray won by 38 votes.

While in the state assembly, Wray supported alternative-energy bills and acted as co-chairman of the Assembly Transportation Committee. While on the board, he pushed for more funding for mass transit.

After losing his bid for a third assembly term to Republican businesswoman Doris Allen, Wray was appointed to the state Unemployment Insurance Appeals Board in 1982 in Sacramento, by then Governor Edmund G. Brown Jr..
