= Bill Morrow (California politician) =

American politician

William P. Morrow
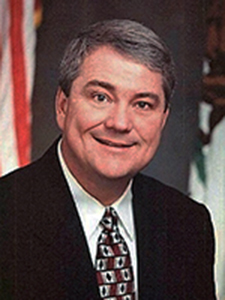

Member of the California Senate from the 38th district
- In office December 7, 1998 – November 30, 2006
- Preceded by: William A. Craven
- Succeeded by: Mark Wyland

Member of the California State Assembly from the 73rd district
- In office December 7, 1992 – November 30, 1998
- Preceded by: David G. Kelley
- Succeeded by: Patricia Bates

Personal details
- Born: April 19, 1954 (age 72) Los Angeles, California, US
- Party: Republican
- Spouse(s): Esther; Barbara Ester
- Children: 1
- Education: Mt. San Antonio College; UCLA; Pepperdine University

Military service
- Branch/service: United States Marine Corps

William Phillip "Bill" Morrow (born April 19, 1954) is an American politician who served in both houses of the California State Legislature, representing certain parts of San Diego and Orange Counties.

== Early life ==
Born and raised in Southern California, Morrow graduated from Ganesha High School in Pomona, CA. He went to earn his A.A. in 1974 at Mt. San Antonio College, where he had served as Student Body President. He transferred to UCLA, where he graduated with honors in 1976. Morrow earned his J.D. from Pepperdine School of Law in 1979. He served in the Marines as a Judge Advocate.

After retiring from the military in 1987, Morrow practiced law as a small business attorney.

== Political life ==
Morrow was elected to the California State Assembly to represent the 73rd District in 1992. He won a second term in 1994 and a third term in 1996 with 63% of the vote. In 1998, Morrow was elected to the California State Senate with 60% of the vote to represent the 38th District. In 2000, he ran for the Congressional seat of retiring Representative Ron Packard and came in second to Darrell Issa in a field of ten in the Republican primary election. Morrow was reelected to the Senate in 2002 with 66% of the vote.

Morrow, an off-road vehicle enthusiast, was caught and cited in 1996 by a ranger for doing "doughnuts" in Anza-Borrego Desert State Park in a four-wheel-drive vehicle with special legislative license plates.

In late 2005 California's 50th Congressional District became vacant due to the resignation of a local congressman caught up in a bribery scandal. Morrow threw his hat into the ring. The initial primary election for the special election to fill the vacancy was held on April 11, 2006. Former Representative Brian Bilbray won the primary.

Morrow was Chair of the Senate Veterans Affairs Committee, Morrow was also the Vice Chair of the Judiciary Committee and the Energy, Utilities and Communications Committee. Morrow also served on the Education Committee and the Business, Professions and Economic Development Committee.

Morrow was one of two Republicans to head a policy committee (Veteran Affairs) in the Democratic-controlled state Senate.

In 2005, Morrow made headlines when he formally joined the Minutemen anti-illegal immigration organization, serving several weekends watching the U.S./Mexico border near the small border community of Campo, California.

Morrow also became a hero to the skateboarding community. He pushed laws that reduced liability for skateboard accidents, making it feasible for cities to build skateboard parks.

Morrow is an anti-abortion leader and an opponent to experimentation on human embryonic stem cells. In 2005-06 Morrow authored Senate Constitutional Amendment 1, which limit marriage to "one man-one woman."

In 2001-2002, the conservative senator teamed up with liberal Democratic Senator Joe Dunn, from Orange County, leading a special select committee investigation of the California energy crisis. Morrow made a committee motion to hold Enron in contempt for failing to respond to committee document subpoenas; the motion carried.

Toward the end of his tenure in the California Senate Morrow sponsored the controversial "Students Bill of Rights," which was modeled on David Horowitz's Academic Bill of Rights. Morrow introduced the bill "to help protect students in our public education system from harassment and abuse." However, some critics alleged that the bill's vaguely worded requirements—e.g., to respect the "unsettled character" of the social sciences and humanities—denied the distinction between plausible theories and implausible theories, giving theories like Holocaust denials an academic respect not warranted by the evidence." This criticism was given further support when Morrow publicly claimed the bill "treats all ideological perspectives the same." In addition, the bill required social science and humanities faculty to "provide students with dissenting sources and viewpoints." Given the bill's vague criteria, some critics alleged that this requirement could be used to force faculty to cover implausible theories in their classes. Though the bill gained some media attention, it never made it out of committee.

Morrow lives in Oceanside with his wife, Barbara, and his son Will, from a previous marriage. Morrow is an avid outdoorsman.

California Senate
| Preceded by Bill Craven | California State Senator; 38th District; 1998–2006 | Succeeded by Mark Wyland |
California Assembly
| Preceded by Nolan Frizzelle | California State Assemblyman; 73rd District; 1992–1998 | Succeeded by Patricia C. Bates |
