= Kate Sanchez =

American politician

- Official portrait, 2026

Member of the California State Assembly from the 71st district
- Incumbent
- Assumed office December 5, 2022
- Preceded by: Randy Voepel

Personal details
- Born: January 8, 1988 (age 38) Pomona, California
- Party: Republican
- Education: Salve Regina University (BA)
- Website: Official website

Kate Sanchez (born 1988) is an American politician and businesswoman who has served in the California State Assembly from the 71st district since 2022, succeeding Randy G. Voepel.

== State Assembly ==
Sanchez introduced two bills shortly after taking office – the first, focused on crime and public safety, would prevent human trafficking cases from being handled by multiple prosecutors. The second focused on education. She was barred from joining the California Latino Legislative Caucus, which is only made up of Democrats. Sanchez says she is a Hispanic working mother.

In her second term, Sanchez introduced a bill prohibiting transgender girls from participating in California Interscholastic Federation team sports.

== Electoral history ==
2022 California State Assembly 71st district election
Primary election
Party	Candidate	Votes	%
Republican	Matt Rahn	41,943	51.7
Republican	Kate Sanchez	39,143	48.2
Democratic	Albia Cooper Miller (write-in)	58	0.1
Total votes		81,144	100.0
General election
Republican	Kate Sanchez	75,603	51.3
Republican	Matt Rahn	71,730	48.7
Total votes		147,333	100.0
Republican hold			

2024 California State Assembly 71st district election
Primary election
Party	Candidate	Votes	%
Republican	Kate Sanchez (incumbent)	71,079	63.1
Democratic	Gary Kephart	38,610	34.3
Peace and Freedom	Babar Khan	2,912	2.6
Total votes		112,601	100.0
General election
Republican	Kate Sanchez (incumbent)	147,932	61.5
Democratic	Gary Kephart	92,424	38.5
Total votes		240,356	100.0
Republican hold			
