= Mickey Conroy =

American politician (1927–2005)

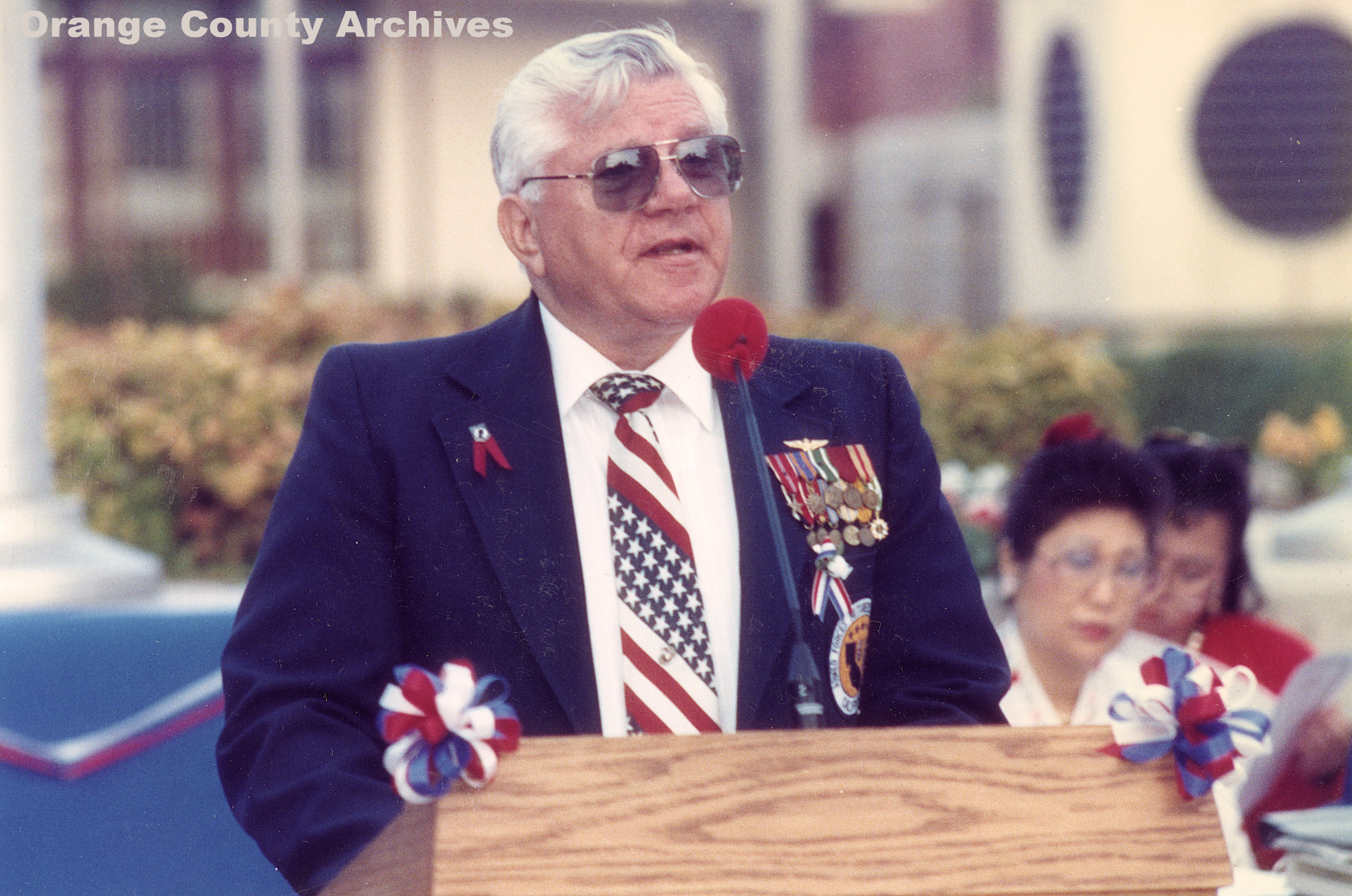
- Conroy speaking at the Santa Ana Civic Center.

Member of the California State Assembly from the 71st district
- In office December 7, 1992 - November 30, 1996
- Preceded by: Doris Allen
- Succeeded by: Bill Campbell

Member of the California State Assembly from the 67th district
- In office September 18, 1991 - November 30, 1992
- Preceded by: John Lewis
- Succeeded by: Doris Allen

Personal details
- Born: November 1, 1927 Footedale, Pennsylvania, US
- Died: September 20, 2005 (aged 77) Orange, California, US
- Party: Republican
- Spouse: Ann Landers (m. 1956)
- Children: 2

Military service
- Branch/service: United States Navy; United States Marine Corps
- Battles/wars: World War II; Korean War; Vietnam War

Mickey Conroy, Maj. USMC Ret. (November 1, 1927 – September 20, 2005) was an American politician who served as a California State Assemblyman from 1991 to 1996. Conroy once gained notoriety in the mid-1990s for sponsoring a bill that permitted the paddling of graffiti artists.

== Biography ==
Conroy was born in Footedale, Pennsylvania. After serving in World War II with the Merchant Marines and later with the United States Navy, Conroy joined the Marine Corps and eventually retired with the rank of major.

In a 1991 special election, the conservative Republican was elected to represent Orange County's 67th Assembly District in Sacramento to succeed Doris Allen, who had been recalled from office. Conroy was an outspoken defender of traditional American values and fiscal responsibility. He served as the chairman of the Assembly Utilities and Commerce Committee. His efforts on behalf of California's veterans included leading the campaign for a veteran's national cemetery in Riverside and Orange County veterans' charities.

In 1996, a sexual harassment lawsuit was brought by a former Conroy aide, Robyn Boyd. A Sacramento jury rejected sexual harassment and battery allegations against Conroy, but found him guilty of inflicting emotional distress on his accuser, Robyn Boyd. She was awarded $386,240, though the state paid a slightly lower amount, $360,000, to settle Conroy's appeal.

Mickey Conroy died in 2005; his wife, Ann, died in 2009. They are survived by their children, Michael and Kathy; son-in-law Larry; and grandchildren Justin, Brandon, and Jenna.

Political offices
Preceded by John R. Lewis	California State Assemblyman, 67th District; 1991-1992	Succeeded by Doris Allen
Preceded by Doris Allen	California State Assemblyman, 71st District; 1992-1996	Succeeded by Bill Campbell
