= Tony Rackauckas =

American attorney and politician

21st Orange County District Attorney
- In office January 4, 1999 – January 7, 2019
- Preceded by: Michael Capizzi
- Succeeded by: Todd Spitzer

Personal details
- Born: Anthony Joseph Rackauckas Jr. March 18, 1943 (age 83) Long Beach, California
- Party: Republican
- Spouse: Married
- Children: 5
- Education: California State University, Long Beach (BA); Loyola Law School (JD)
- Occupation: Attorney

Anthony Joseph Rackauckas Jr. (born March 18, 1943) is a former District Attorney of Orange County, California, and a former Superior Court judge.

After losing his reelection bid for a sixth term as Orange County DA in 2018, Rackauckas has come under fire for allegedly fabricating evidence related to a rape and kidnapping case.

== Early life ==
He was born in the family of Mexican-American Maria Socorro Limón and Anthony Joseph Rackauckas, whose family had arrived from Lithuania. Rackauckas served in the United States Army as a paratrooper in the 101st Airborne Division from 1962 to 1964. After completing his service in the army, he attended California State University, Long Beach from 1964–1968 while simultaneously serving in the United States Army Reserve.

After earning his Bachelor of Arts degree in Political Science from CSULB in 1968, Rackauckas attended Loyola Law School while simultaneously serving as a social worker in the Los Angeles County Department of Public Social Services. He graduated from Loyola in 1971, earning his Juris Doctor degree.

== Career ==
In 1972, Rackauckas left the Los Angeles County Department of Public Social Services to become a Deputy District Attorney in the Orange County District Attorney's Office, where he served until leaving in 1988 to enter private practice. While in private practice, Rackauckas authored Proposition 115, which appeared on the June 1990 ballot.

Rackauckas left private practice in 1990 when he was appointed by California Governor George Deukmejian to be a municipal court judge. Rackauckas served as a municipal court judge until March 1993, when Governor Pete Wilson appointed him a Superior Court judge, a post in which he served until becoming District Attorney of Orange County.

Rackauckas won the support of 59% of Orange County voters in the June 1998 election for District Attorney against Deputy District Attorney Wally Wade and took office in January 1999. He then won the support of 62% of the voters in a March 2002 rematch with Wade. He was unopposed in his June 2006 and 2010 bids for a third and fourth consecutive term, winning 100% of the vote in each year.

In February 2014, Rackauckas filed documents required to seek a fifth term in office. He raised $419,000 during a fundraiser at the Balboa Bay Resort in Newport Beach for his re-election campaign. He won re-election in 2014 with support from 73.3% of the voters.

Rackauckas has been criticized by Public Defender Scott Sanders for his office's purported mishandling of jailhouse informants which has created difficulties in convicting and sentencing defendants due to the violations of defendants' constitutional rights. This resulted in the "taking off the table" of the death penalty for Scott Dekraai, who had pleaded guilty to murdering eight people and wounding another in the Seal Beach massacre. Dekraai was sentenced on September 22, 2017 by Goethals to eight terms of life in prison without the possibility of parole, one term for each of his victims and to seven years to life for attempted murder.

Rackauckas ran for a sixth term in 2018. On November 6, 2018, Rackauckas was defeated by Orange County Supervisor Todd Spitzer in a runoff.

After the electoral defeat, Rackauckas admitted during a deposition that he had used a high profile sexual assault case to increase his chances of winning the election. His successor to the office of District Attorney, Todd Spitzer, stated that Rackauckas had invented evidence against the defendants in the sex case. The charges against the defendants were dropped.

In January 2019, Rackauckas opened a law office in Tustin, focusing on transactional law and civil litigation.

== Electoral history ==
=== Orange County, California District Attorney ===
Orange County, California District Attorney election, 2002
Party	Candidate	Votes	%
Nonpartisan	Tony Rackauckas (incumbent)	275,410	61.8%
Nonpartisan	Wallace Wade	170,402	38.2%
Total votes		445,812	100.0%

Orange County, California District Attorney election, 2006
Party	Candidate	Votes	%
Nonpartisan	Tony Rackauckas (incumbent)	296,830	100.0%
Total votes		296,830	100.0%

Orange County, California District Attorney election, 2010
Party	Candidate	Votes	%
Nonpartisan	Tony Rackauckas (incumbent)	336,328	100.0%
Total votes		336,328	100.0%

Orange County, California District Attorney election, 2014
Party	Candidate	Votes	%
Nonpartisan	Tony Rackauckas (incumbent)	212,716	73.3%
Nonpartisan	Greg Diamond	77,473	26.7%
Total votes		290,189	100.0%

Orange County, California District Attorney election, 2018
Party	Candidate	Votes	%
Nonpartisan	Tony Rackauckas (incumbent)	209,148	38.5%
Nonpartisan	Todd Spitzer	191,346	35.2%
Nonpartisan	Brett Murdock	121,818	22.4%
Nonpartisan	Lenore Albert-Sheridan	20,890	3.8%
Total votes		543,202	100.0%

Orange County, California District Attorney election runoff, 2018
Party	Candidate	Votes	%
Nonpartisan	Todd Spitzer	484,830	53.2%
Nonpartisan	Tony Rackauckas (incumbent)	425,764	46.8%
Total votes		910,594	100.0%
