= Doris Allen (politician) =

American politician (1936–1999)

59th Speaker of the California State Assembly
- In office June 5, 1995 – September 14, 1995
- Preceded by: Willie Brown
- Succeeded by: Brian Setencich

Member of the California State Assembly
- In office December 7, 1992 – November 28, 1995
- Preceded by: Chester B. Wray
- Succeeded by: Scott Baugh
- Constituency: 71st district (1982–1992); 67th district (1992–1995)

Personal details
- Born: Doris Jean Frazee; May 26, 1936 Kansas City, Missouri, U.S.
- Died: September 22, 1999 (aged 63) Colorado Springs, Colorado, U.S.
- Party: Republican
- Spouse(s): James Allen (m. 1967–1988) Elmer James Herbertson
- Children: 2

Doris Jean Allen (May 26, 1936 – September 22, 1999) was an American politician from California. Allen served in the California Assembly from 1982 to 1995, representing part of Orange County, and as speaker of that body from June 5 to September 14, 1995, before being recalled from office. Allen was the first woman to be elected to that office.

== Early life and education ==
Allen was born in Kansas City, Missouri and raised in Cypress, California.

== Career ==
Before entering politics, Allen owned a successful household lighting store. An amateur actress, she played the title role in the musical Mame in productions by the Westminster Community Theater and Sebastian's West in the early-1970s.

=== California State Assembly ===
On November 2, 1982, Allen won the election and became a member of California State Assembly for the 71st district. Allen unseated Chester B. Wray with 51.6% of the votes.

Based in Huntington Beach, She compiled a relatively conservative record with special attention to environmental protection for her coastal district. Republicans gained a one-vote majority in the Assembly after the 1994 election, threatening longtime Democratic Speaker Willie Brown's 15-year tenure. At first, Brown persuaded moderate Republican turned Independent Paul Horcher to keep him in power.

==== Recall ====
Meanwhile, Allen was running in a special election for the California State Senate. However, GOP party leaders endorsed fellow assemblyman Ross Johnson, who had moved into the district to run. Allen lost the election. When Horcher was recalled from office and replaced by a more loyal Republican, Speaker Brown convinced a still-angry Allen to vote with Democrats and become speaker herself. However, Brown continued to lead the legislative body as head of the Democratic Caucus.

Allen's defection outraged her Republican colleagues, led by Curt Pringle, as well as her Republican constituents, who in November 1995 recalled her from office. Before her removal, Allen resigned as speaker and was succeeded by Brian Setencich. However, when Brown resigned his seat in the State Assembly to be sworn in as mayor of San Francisco, Setencich lost that vote, restoring the Republicans' majority electing Pringle as Speaker in January 1996. Setencich himself was defeated for reelection in that June's GOP primary.

Following her recall, Allen eventually moved away from California, though she did make a final bid for her old seat in 1998.

== Personal life ==
On September 22, 1999, Allen died from cancer in Colorado Springs. Allen was 63 years old.

== See also ==
- List of female speakers of legislatures in the United States
