= Randy Voepel =

American politician (born 1950)

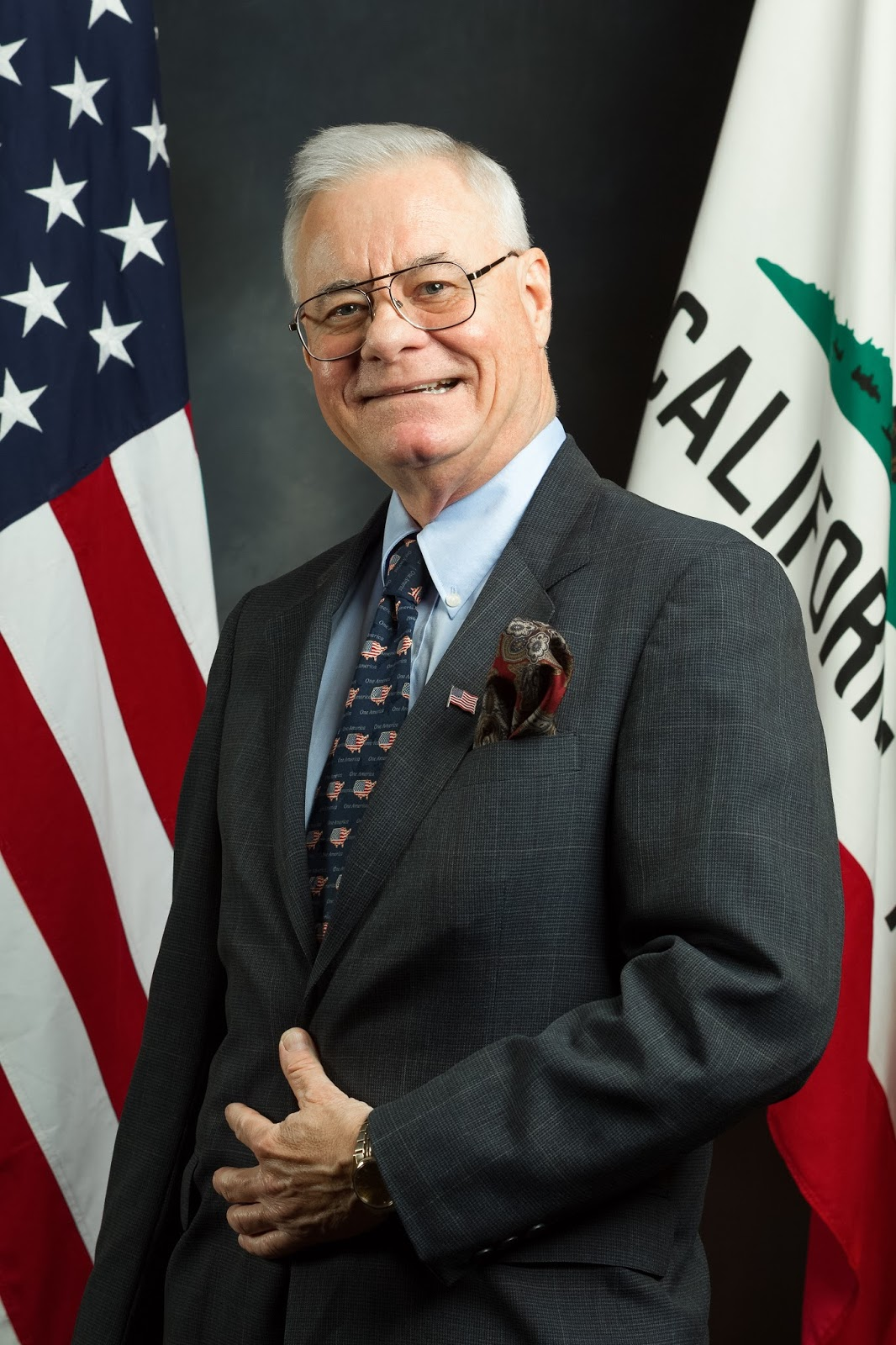

Member of the California State Assembly from the 71st district
- In office December 5, 2016 – December 5, 2022
- Preceded by: Brian Jones
- Succeeded by: Kate Sanchez

Mayor of Santee, California
- In office 2000–2016
- Preceded by: Jack E. Dale
- Succeeded by: John Minto

Member of the Santee City Council
- In office 1996–2000

Personal details
- Born: September 21, 1950 (age 76) Saint Charles, Missouri, U.S.
- Party: Republican
- Children: 2, including Laura

Military service
- Allegiance: United States
- Branch/service: United States Navy
- Battles/wars: Vietnam War

Randy Greg Voepel (born September 21, 1950) is an American politician. He served in the city government of Santee, California, and in the California State Assembly from the 71st district. He was the vice-chair of the Veterans Affairs, Aging & Long-Term Care, and Public Employment & Retirement committees and a member of the Insurance, Local Government, and Joint Legislative Audit committees. Voepel lost his reelection bid in the 2022 California State Assembly election, with his term ending on December 5, 2022.

== Early life ==
On September 21, 1950, Voepel was born in Saint Charles, Missouri. In August 1969, Voepel enlisted in the United States Navy. During the Vietnam War, Voepel served on the USS Buchanan, a guided-missile destroyer. Voepel received the Combat Action Ribbon and military awards.

== Career ==
In 1996, Voepel became a member of the Santee City Council. In 2000, Voepel became the Mayor of Santee until 2016.

On November 8, 2016, Voepel won the election and became a Republican member of California State Assembly for District 71, encompassing most of inland San Diego County and part of Riverside County.

In 2022, redistricting would have placed him into a new district with another member of the state Assembly, Marie Waldron, but Voepel lost by a wide margin.

=== Comments on January 6th ===
Following the January 6 United States Capitol attack, Voepel said, "This is Lexington and Concord. First shots fired against tyranny. Tyranny will follow in the aftermath of the Biden swear-in on January 20th."

== Electoral history ==
=== 2020 California State Assembly ===
California's 71st State Assembly district election, 2020
Primary election
Party	Candidate	Votes	%
Republican	Randy Voepel (incumbent)	77,069	61.1
Democratic	Liz "Elizabeth" Lavertu	49,073	38.9
Total votes		126,142	100.0
General election
Republican	Randy Voepel (incumbent)	136,156	59.6
Democratic	Liz "Elizabeth" Lavertu	92,385	40.4
Total votes		228,541	100.0

=== 2018 California State Assembly ===
California's 71st State Assembly district election, 2018
Primary election
Party	Candidate	Votes	%
Republican	Randy Voepel (incumbent)	41,561	43.6
Democratic	James Elia	30,672	32.2
Republican	Larry A. Wilske	23,106	24.2
Total votes		95,339	100.0
General election
Republican	Randy Voepel (incumbent)	100,386	60.6
Democratic	James Elia	65,194	39.4
Total votes		165,580	100.0
Republican hold			

=== 2016 California State Assembly ===
California's 71st State Assembly district election, 2016
Primary election
Party	Candidate	Votes	%
Republican	Randy Voepel	51,857	59.9
Republican	Leo Hamel	23,990	27.7
Republican	Tony Teora	10,770	12.4
Total votes		86,617	100.0
General election
Republican	Randy Voepel	108,049	65.8
Republican	Leo Hamel	56,184	34.2
Total votes		164,233	100.0
Republican hold			

== Awards ==
- Combat Action Ribbon
- Vietnam Cross Gallantry

== Personal life ==
Voepel was formerly married to Pamela Palmer. He is now married to Susan. He has two adult children. He has a grandson, Anderson Lee Aldrich, who was convicted of perpetrating the 2022 Colorado Springs nightclub shooting. His former son-in-law was Aaron Brink, a mixed martial arts fighter and pornographic film actor. Voepel and his wife live in Santee, California.
