= 2011 Seal Beach shooting =

Mass shooting in California, U.S.

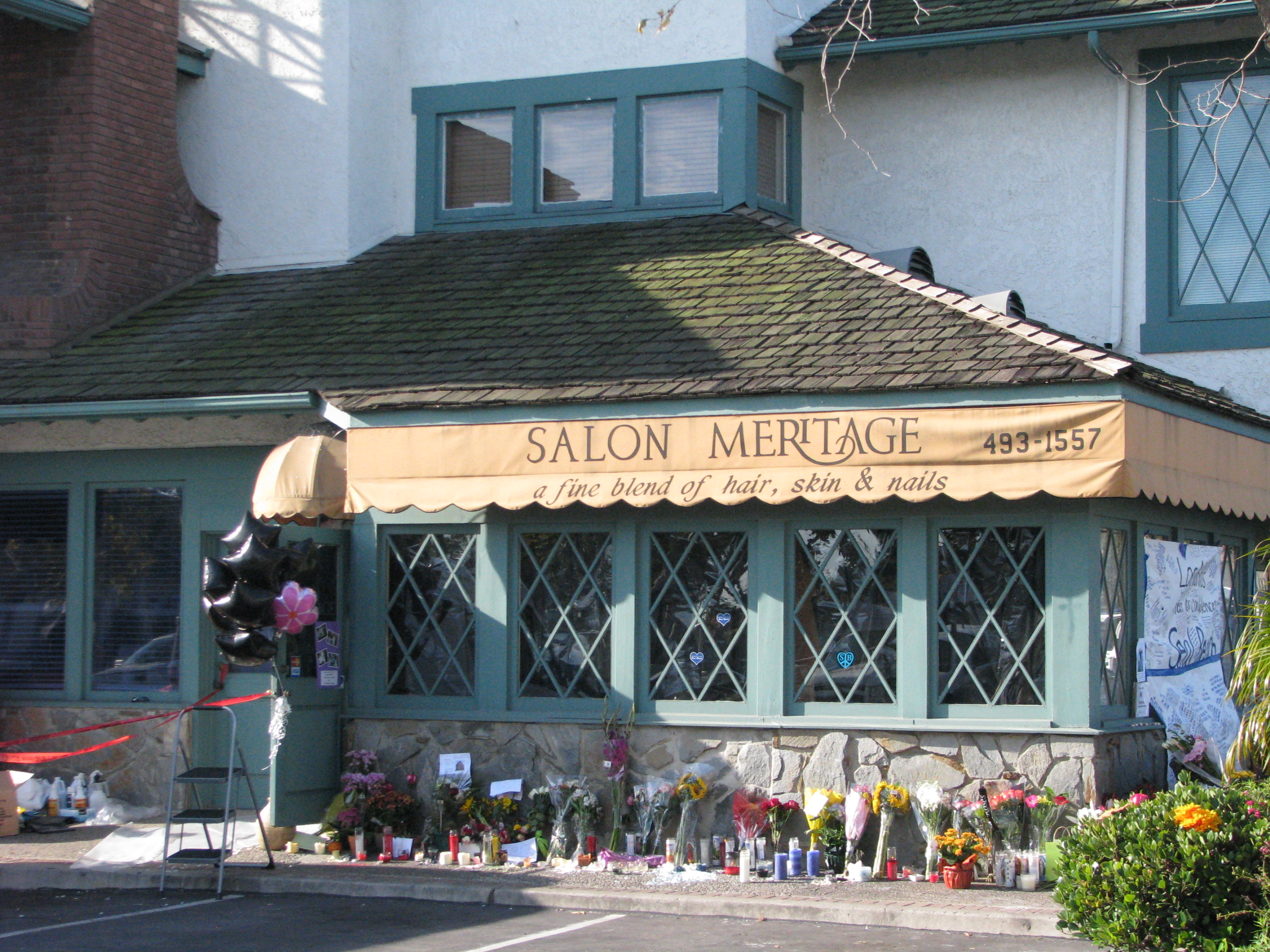
- Salon Meritage, with floral tributes, following the shooting
- Location: 33.74555°N 118.10630°W; 500 Pacific Coast Hwy, Seal Beach, California, U.S.
- Date: October 12, 2011; 15 years ago 1:21 pm (PDT; UTC−07:00)
- Attack type: Mass murder, mass shooting
- Weapons: 9mm Springfield semi-automatic pistol; .45 caliber Heckler & Koch semi-automatic pistol; .44 Magnum Smith & Wesson Model 29 revolver
- Deaths: 8
- Injuries: 1
- Perpetrator: Scott Evans Dekraai
- Convictions: First-degree murder under special circumstances (8 counts); Attempted first-degree murder

On October 12, 2011, a mass shooting occurred at the Salon Meritage hair salon in Seal Beach, California, United States. Eight people inside the salon and one person in the parking lot were shot, and only one victim survived. It remains the deadliest mass killing in Orange County history.

Scott Evans Dekraai, who was involved in a custody dispute with his ex-wife (one of the shooting victims), pleaded guilty to the shooting on May 2, 2014. On September 22, 2017, Dekraai was sentenced to eight terms of life imprisonment without parole and one term of seven years to life for attempted murder.

== Shooting ==
On Wednesday, October 12, 2011, at 1:21 pm PDT (20:21 UTC), police responded to reports of shots fired at the Salon Meritage hair salon at 500 Pacific Coast Highway. The shooter was armed with three handguns, and reloaded at least once during the attack, which lasted two minutes.

There were about twenty people in the salon at the time, some managing to escape by running into the street or hiding in neighboring businesses. Six people were declared dead at the scene, and three survivors were taken to a hospital where two of them later died of their wounds. Police later named the weapons used in the shooting as a 9mm Springfield, a .45-caliber Heckler & Koch, and a .44 Magnum Smith & Wesson Model 29.

The shooter's former wife, Michelle Fournier, one of the employees at the salon, was one of the victims. The suspect in the shooting, named by police as 41-year-old Scott Evans Dekraai of Huntington Beach, California, was arrested without incident after being stopped while driving a white pickup truck about one half-mile (0.8 km) from the scene of the crime. Dekraai was wearing body armor at the time of his arrest.

The incident was the worst mass murder in Orange County, surpassing the Fullerton massacre in July 1976, in which seven people died. There had been only one murder in Seal Beach during the previous four years.

A candlelight vigil was held in the evening of the next day for the victims of the shooting. A fund set up to aid victims of the shooting raised around $400,000. A remodeled Salon Meritage reopened under the same name on November 18, 2012.

== Victims ==
Dekraai killed six women and two men. One other woman was also shot but survived. The victims were:

- Victoria Buzzo, 54, who worked at the salon.
- David Caouette, 64, was killed while sitting in his Land Rover Discovery parked outside the salon. Caouette was the final victim, and was shot through the front windshield and passenger window of his vehicle. He had been visiting the restaurant next to the salon.
- Randy Lee Fannin, 62, the owner of Salon Meritage; according to eyewitnesses, he was the first person to be shot. He reportedly said to Dekraai: "Please don't do this. There's another way. Let's go outside and talk."
- Michele Daschbach Fast, 47, a customer who was having her hair styled at the salon.
- Michelle Marie Fournier, 48, who worked as a hair stylist at the salon and was the shooter's ex-wife.
- Lucia Bernice Kondas, 65, a customer who was having her hair styled at the salon.
- Laura Webb, 46, worked at the salon and was doing her mother's hair at the time of the incident; her mother, Hattie Stretz, 73, was shot and critically injured.
- Christy Lynn Wilson, 47, who worked at the salon. Wilson testified in a court custody hearing on behalf of Fournier the day before the shooting spree.
- Hattie Stretz, 73, was critically injured when a singular bullet went through her arm and her upper chest, but she survived the shooting, and was released from the hospital on October 17. She was a customer having her hair done by her daughter, Laura Webb, one of the stylists who died in the shooting.

Sandy Fannin, co-owner of the salon and wife of Randy Fannin, was on the premises at the time of the shooting but survived unharmed by hiding at the back of the property.

== Perpetrator ==
Booking photo of Scott Evans Dekraai, taken soon after his arrest.

Scott Evans Dekraai (born October 17, 1969) divorced his wife Michelle in 2007 after four years of marriage. Court records showed that he had been engaged in a bitter custody dispute over his eight-year-old son. His personality was said to have changed after an accident on board a tugboat in February 2007, which left him with serious leg injuries.

Following an incident later in 2007 involving his stepfather, a restraining order was filed against him, barring him from possessing firearms. The order lasted a year and had expired at the time of the shooting. Court documents filed in September 2008 diagnosed him with PTSD. A court hearing had taken place on October 11, 2011, the day before the shooting, which recommended a near-equal custody arrangement.

== Prosecution ==
Orange County District Attorney Tony Rackauckas announced on October 14, 2011, that Dekraai would be charged with eight counts of murder with special circumstances, and one of attempted murder. He also indicated that his office would seek the death penalty. In a news conference following the shooting, Rackauckas said: "For almost two minutes, Dekraai shot victim after victim, executing eight people by shooting them in the head and chest. He was not done. He then walked out of the salon and shot a ninth victim, a man, who was sitting nearby in a parked Range Rover."

In an affidavit submitted to police, Dekraai said that he first shot his ex-wife multiple times on entering the salon, contradicting the view of eyewitnesses inside the salon who said that salon owner Randy Fannin was the first victim. Dekraai said that on the morning of the shooting, he had argued with his ex-wife over the telephone, causing him to consider killing her. He also said that David Caouette – an apparently random victim sitting in his parked car outside the salon – had been shot because he thought that he was "an off-duty or undercover police officer".

Dekraai's arraignment took place on November 29, 2011, at which he entered a plea of not guilty. The start date for the trial, originally scheduled for March 25, 2013, was postponed until November 2013 to allow defense attorneys to review recordings obtained by a prison informant. The trial was postponed again until March 24, 2014. Dekraai pleaded guilty to the shooting on May 2. The punishment phase of his trial was scheduled for August 18.

In March 2015, the Orange County District Attorney's Office was removed from the case following a ruling by Judge Thomas Goethals that the office had violated Dekraai's rights by improperly withholding evidence from the defense. Goethals assigned California Attorney General Kamala Harris to take over the prosecution. Harris's office announced its intention to appeal the decision, leading to a delay in the sentencing.

In August 2017, Goethals ruled that Dekraai was ineligible to receive the death penalty due to the purported prosecutorial misconduct in the case. Dekraai was sentenced to eight terms of life imprisonment without parole and one term of seven years to life for attempted murder.

== Memorial ==
A memorial commemorating the victims of the shooting was built in Eisenhower Park in Seal Beach in 2015.

== See also ==
- List of homicides in California
