= Patricia Bates =

American Republican politician

Pat Bates
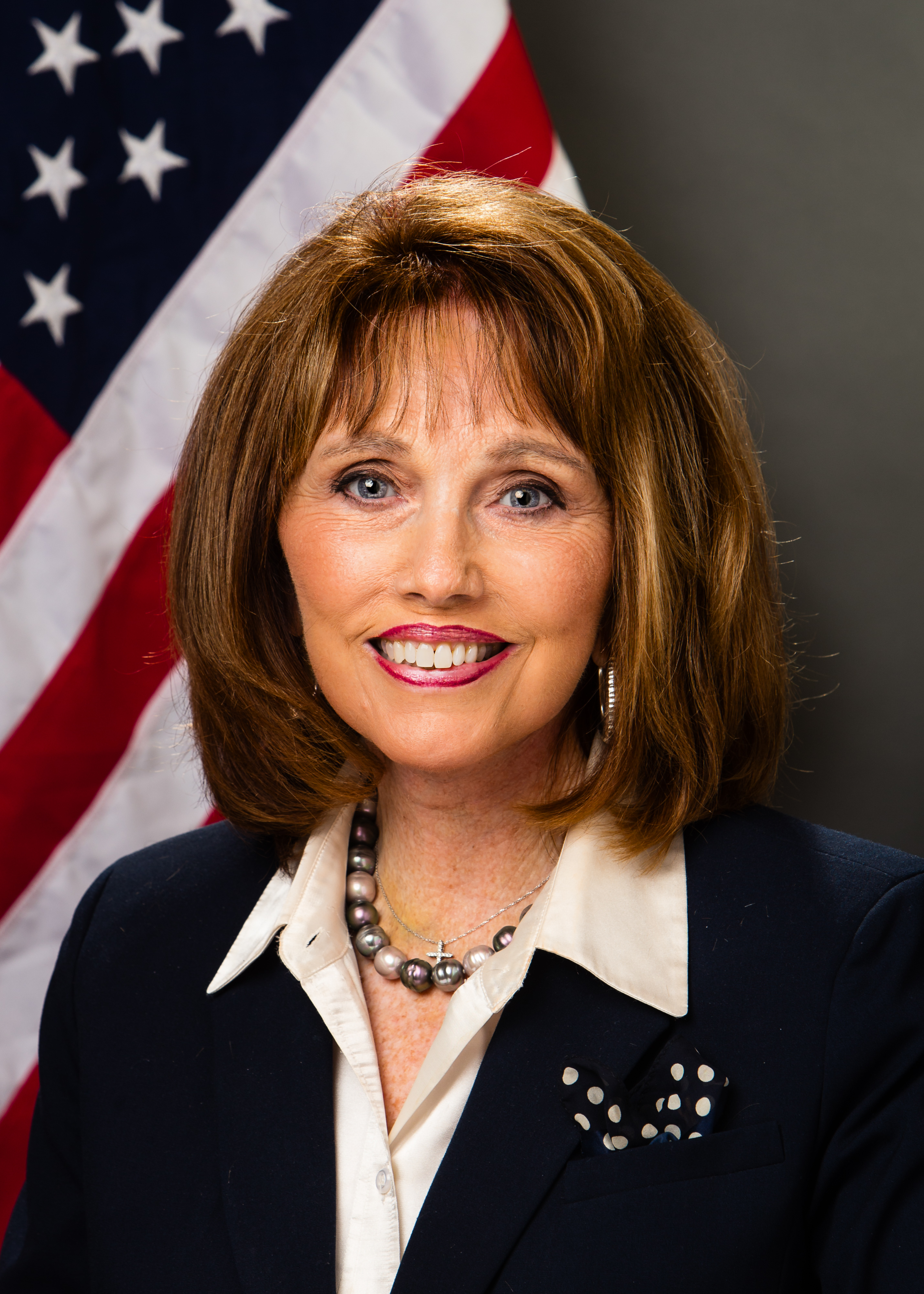
- Official portrait, 2014

Minority Leader of the California Senate
- In office April 12, 2017 – March 1, 2019
- Preceded by: Jean Fuller
- Succeeded by: Shannon Grove

Member of the California Senate from the 36th district
- In office December 1, 2014 – December 7, 2022
- Preceded by: Joel Anderson (redistricted)
- Succeeded by: Janet Nguyen

Member of the California State Assembly from the 73rd district
- In office December 7, 1998 – November 30, 2004
- Preceded by: Bill Morrow
- Succeeded by: Mimi Walters

Chair of the Orange County Board of Supervisors
- In office January 13, 2009 – January 1, 2010
- Preceded by: John Moorlach
- Succeeded by: Janet Nguyen

Vice Chair of the Orange County Board of Supervisors
- In office January 8, 2008 – January 13, 2009
- Preceded by: John Moorlach
- Succeeded by: Janet Nguyen
- In office January 8, 2013 – November 25, 2014
- Preceded by: Shawn Nelson
- Succeeded by: Todd Spitzer

Member of the Orange County Board of Supervisors from the 5th district
- In office January 9, 2007 – December 1, 2014
- Preceded by: Thomas W. Wilson
- Succeeded by: Lisa Bartlett

Mayor of Laguna Niguel
- In office 1989–2004
- Preceded by: Office established
- Succeeded by: Joe Brown

Personal details
- Born: Patricia Ann Carmody; December 15, 1939 (age 86) Long Beach, California, U.S.
- Party: Republican
- Spouse: John Bates (m. 1963)
- Children: 2
- Education: California State University, Long Beach; Occidental College (BS)

Patricia "Pat" Carmody Bates (born December 15, 1939) is an American Republican politician who served in the California State Senate, representing the 36th Senate district, which encompasses parts of Orange and San Diego counties. She left office on December 5, 2022. She served as the Senate's minority leader from 2017 to 2019. She previously served as a member of the Orange County Board of Supervisors from 2007 to 2014, and the California State Assembly from 1998 to 2004. She also served as the first mayor of Laguna Niguel, California following its incorporation in 1989, and continued to serve on the city council until 1998. Before serving as mayor, she had been employed as a social worker in Los Angeles County.

== Early life, education, and career as social worker ==
Patricia Carmody Bates was born in Los Angeles. She grew up in Rosemead, California, in the San Gabriel Valley, before her family moved to Long Beach when she was 12 years old. She graduated from Wilson High School and then attended Occidental College, majoring in psychology and studying abroad at the University of Madrid in her junior year. She graduated in 1961. Bates began her professional career as a social worker for the Los Angeles County Department of Public Social Services. She was employed by the department for ten years, and became a deputy district director. In a 2018 interview, Bates said that her experience as a government bureaucrat made her realize government's shortcomings and caused her to view some government programs unfavorably.

== Laguna Niguel mayor and councilmember ==
Bates lived in Long Beach before moving in 1978 to what was then unincorporated Laguna Niguel in south Orange County. Bates's political involvement began in the 1980s, when she was involved in a group called Citizens for a Safer Crown Valley Parkway, focused on improving pedestrian safety along a road corridor in Laguna Niguel. She was a school volunteer and a then a member of the Laguna Niguel Community Council, serving as its president from 1986 to 1987. Bates was also elected to the five-member, quasi-governmental Community Services District in 1986.

After Laguna Niguel was incorporated as a city, she became the first mayor of Laguna Niguel in 1989. She received the most votes among the 23 council candidates, and was named mayor. She remained on the city council for a decade. She was a board member of Saddleback Community College and the South Coast Medical Center Foundation. Bates was the council's representative to the El Toro Reuse Planning Authority, which opposed proposals to build an airport at the former Marine Corps Air Station El Toro; she was vice chair of the Authority.

== California State Assembly ==
Bates was member of the California State Assembly from 1998 to 2004, representing the 73rd Assembly district. She won the 1998 Republican Assembly primary election with an endorsement by the outgoing Republican incumbent, Bill Morrow. While in the Assembly, Bates sponsored legislation to extend "Megan's Law" to college campuses, and to allocate $35 million for projects to improve California beaches, many of which suffered from beach erosion.

== Orange County Board of Supervisors ==
Bates was a member of the Orange County Board of Supervisors from 2007 to 2014. She represented the 5th district, a largely white, wealthy, and conservative part of the county, stretching from Aliso Viejo to San Clemente. She was elected to the Board in 2006 in a contentious campaign in which she faced three other candidates, the most significant being former Laguna Niguel mayor Cathryn DeYoung. While Bates had greater name recognition and endorsements, DeYoung had a fundraising advantage. DeYoung's campaign spent $2.7 million (including a $2.1 million loan from DeYoung herself); Bates campaign spent almost $700,000 (including $279,000 loan from Bates herself). The two candidates' campaigns collectively spent almost $3.4 million, making it by far the most expensive campaign for supervisor in Orange County history up to that point. The race was characterized by harsh negative campaigning, much of it focused on illegal immigration. DeYoung attacked Bates as "weak on illegal immigration" while emphasizing her own anti-illegal immigration stance. Bates' campaign sued DeYoung in an attempt to block a mailer that depicted Bates' face superimposed on a Matrícula Consular; two courts rejected Bates' request.

As a member of the Orange County Board of Supervisors, Bates joined in the unanimous 2007 vote to create the Citizens Law Enforcement Review Board, a civilian police oversight agency to review complaints of misconduct levied against county law enforcement, although Bates wondered at the time whether the board would become a "toothless tiger." In 2009, Bates joined in the Board's unanimous vote to overhaul the county Planning Department, which had been criticized in an audit for serious lapses.

In 2012, Bates voted against a proposal by Board chairman John Moorlach to place a referendum on the ballot that would change supervisor term limits from a maximum of two consecutive four-year terms to a lifetime maximum of three four-year terms. The proposal failed on a 3–2 vote.

== California State Senate ==
In 2014, Bates was elected to the California State Senate. She was elected from the 36th Senate district, which covers an area in south Orange County and north San Diego County with more than 1 million residents.

In 2017, Bates was elected by her fellow Senate Republicans as the minority leader of the California State Senate. She was the second woman in the history of the state to lead a party caucus, the other being her predecessor Jean Fuller. Bates led a small caucus; Republicans made up less than one-third of the state Senate, which had a Democratic supermajority. In the 2017-18 session, Republicans had 13 seats and the Democrats had 27 seats. Bates was reelected to her seat in the November 2018 elections, despite a Democratic wave in Orange County and statewide Republican losses. In the 2019 session, Republicans had only 11 seats in the California Senate. In January 2019, at the beginning of the session, the Senate Republicans voted to oust Bates as leader, replacing her with social conservative Shannon Grove of Bakersfield.

Bates was not eligible to seek reelection to the Senate in 2022 due to term limits.

=== Crime issues ===
Bates authored legislation to reclassify several offenses as "violent" felonies to close what she believes are loopholes in state law, siding with prosecutors arguing that the state's list of "violent felony" could allow some dangerous inmates to walk free. Bates was honored by Crime Victims United of California as one of its legislators of the year.

In 2019, Bates sponsored a law to close a loophole related to inmates convicted of a sexually violent offense; the bill, signed into law by Governor Gavin Newsom, requiring such inmates to be evaluated for future risk before they can be paroled. In 2021, Bates sponsored legislation that closed a loophole for sexually violent predators (SVPs) undergoing treatment. The law requires previously committed SVPs to return to a state hospital after completing their new prison sentence, so long as mental health evaluators agree that the inmate still meets SVP criteria. Newsom signed the bill into law.

=== Drug policy and legislation on rehab facilities ===
Bates authored bills to address opioid abuse and to improve regulation of facilities that shelter and treat drug addicts.

She authored SB 1109, which was signed by Governor Jerry Brown in 2018; the legislation increased continuing medical education requirements for opioid prescribers to curb opioid abuse and addiction, required warning labels on opioid prescription bottles, and required youth sports organizations and schools to distribute a document warning student-athletes and their parents or guardians of the risks associated with opioids. Bates sponsored Brandon's Law, a measure that prohibits the operators of drug rehabilitation facilities from making misrepresentations or false claims about the services they offer or their location. Bates also sponsored consumer-protection legislation to require substance abuse rehabilitation facilities that are licensed or certified by the State of California to clearly disclose their license and certification numbers and the expiration dates on their web sites and other advertising material. Bates authored legislation to require criminal background checks on rehab facility owners and operators, and called on the federal government to give local governments tools to help regulate such facilities. She credited Southern California News Group's "Rehab Riviera" coverage for raising greater awareness of the issue.

=== Transportation ===
Bates opposed California's SB 1 (2017), which increased the gas and car tax increase to fund road and bridge repairs. In a 2017 column, Bates criticized the bill as a "Sacramento backroom deal" and said that it was "appalling that 30 percent of the new taxes will not even be used for road repairs" and that the bill did not provide more funding for lane expansion.

Bates opposed the California High-Speed Rail project, calling it "a boondoggle" and urging that the money set aside for high-speed rail be used to fix roads instead.

Bates has supported city plans that serve the needs of electric vehicles. She authorized Legislation that authorized San Diego County, or any city in the county, to establish a "Neighborhood Electric Vehicles Transportation Plan."

=== Education ===
Bates endorsed California's Proposition 51 of 2016, which authorized $9 billion in bonds to fund improvement and construction of school facilities for K-12 schools and community colleges. She urged Governor Jerry Brown to expedite the issuance of the bonds.

=== Environment ===
Bates has stated that "sea level rise and coastal erosion are two major threats to California’s coast" and that "Legislators must come together to find a consensus on solutions."

In 2015, Bates opposed legislation (SB 350) that would require at least 50% of electricity sold to California customers to come from renewable resources by 2030 and would require the California Air Resources Board (CARB) to implement fuel standards to reduce the use of petroleum by 50% by 2030.

Bates voted in favor of California legislation, passed in 2020, that mandates that plastic beverage bottles must contain on average 50% recycled plastic by 2030, among the world's most ambitious targets for recycled plastics content law in the world.”

=== Health care ===
Bates opposed a bill that would establish a single-payer health care system in California, agreeing with Assembly Speaker Anthony Rendon that it was “woefully incomplete” because it did not address financing and other concerns. She also called the bill "a false promise that would ruin the state’s precarious finances and threaten funding for other critical priorities" and said the “Legislature should refocus its efforts on improving existing health programs and on helping those who do not have access to necessary care."

In 2015, Bates introduced legislation to allow Saddleback Memorial Medical Center's San Clemente campus to operate as a stand-alone emergency room in an effort to keep the ER open.

=== Economy, technology, and regulation ===
Bates is a strong supporter of the 1978 California Proposition 13, which restricts property-tax increases in California.

Bates opposed the California Internet Consumer Protection and Net Neutrality Act of 2018, a California net neutrality law, sponsored by Senator Scott Wiener, that barred internet service providers (ISPs) from blocking or restricting bandwidth (throttling or delegating) services or websites and barring "monopolistic" practices among ISPs. Bates said that net neutrality should be left to the federal government and that the law could deter telecommunications companies from investing in infrastructure in California.

Bates voted against SB 63, the New Parent Leave Act, in 2017. The law required companies with more than 20 employees to guarantee California mothers and fathers 12 weeks of protected parental leave after the birth of a child. Bates cited the costs to business as her reason for opposing the legislation.

Bates sponsored legislation that streamlined the process for licensed professional clinical counselors, marriage and family therapists, and clinical social workers in other states to become licensed in California. The bill was signed by Governor Newsom in 2019.

=== Trump ===
Bates endorsed Marco Rubio in the 2016 Republican presidential primaries, serving as California co-chair of Rubio's campaign. She said in early 2016 she would support Donald Trump if he won the Republican nomination. In January 2018, Bates criticized state Democrats for what she viewed as an excessive focus "on what President Trump and the federal government are doing."

=== Sexual harassment ===
Bates called on California legislative leaders to release California whistleblowers from non-disclosure agreements on sexual harassment, and called on the Senate and Assembly's rules committees to undertake a "comprehensive, bicameral and bipartisan review" of such agreements.

=== Education ===
Bates sponsored a bill requiring the California Department of Education to report on the use of existing lockdown drills in K-12 public schools.

=== Housing and homelessness ===
With the support of Encinitas mayor Catherine Blakespear, Bates sponsored bipartisan legislation in 2018 (SB 1226) to make it easier to build, and issue permits for, accessory dwelling units (ADUs or "granny flats") to ease the California housing shortage.

Bates co-authored legislation, signed by Governor Jerry Brown in 2018, allowing the creation of an Orange County trust to help house homeless people.

In August 2021, Bates and fellow Republican Mike Morrell were the Senate's sole "no" votes on legislation that extended a statewide eviction moratorium through January 2022 for tenants who suffered loss of employment and income during the COVID-19 pandemic. Bates cited opposition from a landlord's association. The bill passed the Assembly 56–8, and the Senate 33–2; the legislation was signed into law by Newsom.

=== Campaign finance ===
In August 2018, Bates opposed the advancement of a bill giving legislative leaders more campaign cash. In April 2016, she and a former chairman of the California Fair Political Practices Commission advocated for the passage of a bill that “would bar candidates and elected officials from using money from candidate-controlled committees to promote themselves, their candidacies or the campaigns of others.”

== Personal life ==
Bates married John Bates, an architect, in 1963; they have two children.

California Senate
Preceded by Jean Fuller	Minority Leader of the California Senate; 2017–2019	Succeeded by Shannon Grove
Preceded by Joel Anderson	Member of the California Senate from the 36th district 2014-Present	Incumbent
California Assembly
Preceded by Bill Morrow	Member of the California Assembly from the 73rd district 1998–2004	Succeeded by Mimi Walters
Political offices
Preceded by John Moorlach	Orange County Chair; 2009–2010	Succeeded by Janet Nguyen
Preceded by John Moorlach	Orange County Vice Chair; 2013–2019	Succeeded by Janet Nguyen
Preceded by Shawn Nelson	Orange County Vice Chair; 2013–2019	Succeeded by Todd Spitzer
Preceded by Thomas W. Wilson	Orange County Supervisor; 5th District; 2007–2014	Succeeded by Lisa Bartlett
Preceded by Office established	Mayor of Laguna Niguel; 1989–2004	Succeeded by Joe Brown
