= Janet Nguyen =

American politician (born 1976)

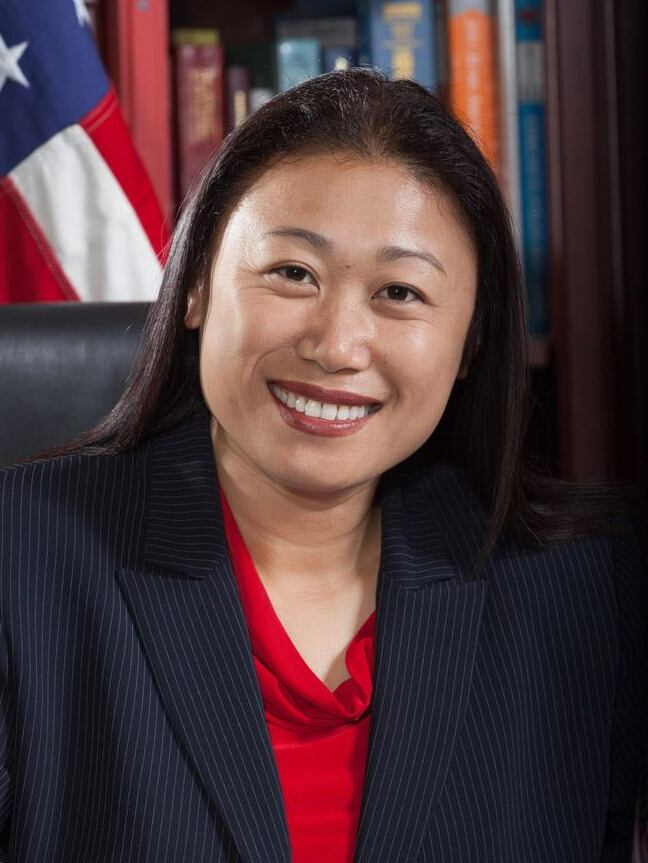
- Official portrait, 2014

Member of the Orange County Board of Supervisors from the 1st district
- Incumbent
- Assumed office December 4, 2024
- Preceded by: Andrew Do
- In office March 27, 2007 – December 1, 2014
- Preceded by: Lou Correa
- Succeeded by: Andrew Do

Member of the California Senate
- In office December 7, 2022 – December 2, 2024
- Preceded by: Patricia Bates
- Succeeded by: Tony Strickland
- Constituency: 36th district
- In office December 1, 2014 – December 3, 2018
- Preceded by: Lou Correa
- Succeeded by: Tom Umberg
- Constituency: 34th district

Member of the California State Assembly from the 72nd district
- In office December 7, 2020 – December 5, 2022
- Preceded by: Tyler Diep
- Succeeded by: Diane Dixon

Personal details
- Born: May 1, 1976 (age 50) Saigon, South Vietnam (now Vietnam)
- Party: Republican
- Spouse: Tom Bonikowski (m. 2005)
- Children: 2 sons
- Education: University of California, Irvine (BA)

Janet Q. Nguyen (born May 1, 1976) is an American politician serving on the Orange County Board of Supervisors, representing the First District, since December 4, 2024. She previously held the same office from 2007 to 2014. A member of the Republican Party, she served in the California State Senate from 2014 to 2018 and 2022 to 2024 and the California State Assembly from 2020 to 2022.

She is the first Vietnamese-American state senator in the United States and the country's first Vietnamese-American woman state legislator. At the age of 30, she was the youngest person to be elected to the board of supervisors, the first woman to be elected from the First District, and the first Vietnamese-American county supervisor in the United States. Prior to her election to the Board of Supervisors, she served as a Garden Grove City Council Member and at age 28, was the youngest person ever elected to that body, until Kim Nguyen (no relation) was elected at 25 in 2016.

== Personal life ==
Nguyen was born in Saigon - Gia Định, North Vietnamese-occupied South Vietnam, on May 1, 1976, roughly one year after the Fall of Saigon on April 30, 1975. Her family joined millions of others in becoming boat people when she was five, coming to California in 1981. They first lived in San Bernardino, but settled in Garden Grove in the early 1990s. She attended the University of California, Irvine, at first on a pre-medical track but changed her major to political science, saying she had been inspired by Supervisor Bill Steiner. She is married to Tom Bonikowski Jr., with whom she has two sons, Thomas III and Timothy.

== Political career ==
=== Orange County Board of Supervisors (2007–2014) ===
Janet Nguyen first won her supervisorial seat following a historic special election where two Vietnamese-American candidates received half of the total votes cast in a field of 10, separated from each other by only 7 votes. She was sworn in on March 27, 2007, after a lengthy court battle. Nguyen won a full, four-year term in 2008. She was reelected to a third term in 2012 and left the Board in 2014 after winning her first State Senate term.

The election of Supervisor Lou Correa to the California State Senate in the 2006 election left his supervisorial seat vacant. Ten candidates filed for the seat in the February 6, 2007, special election, including three Republican Vietnamese Americans. While the 1st District Supervisorial seat is officially non-partisan, the leading candidate was California State Assemblyman Tom Umberg, a Democrat who had the full support of labor unions. The Republican Party did not officially endorse a candidate, but most party leaders were backing Santa Ana City Councilman Carlos Bustamante.

Janet Nguyen's main opponent, Garden Grove Unified School District Trustee Trung Nguyen, had the support of State Assemblyman Van Tran. The election was particularly heated within the Vietnamese-American community, with accusations flying back and forth between the two Nguyen camps. Trung Nguyen's campaign was found to have photoshopped Trung Nguyen into a photo next to Governor Arnold Schwarzenegger, while Janet Nguyen was criticized for not being fluent in Vietnamese.

At the end of election night, Janet Nguyen was leading by 52 votes, with Trung Nguyen in second place. However, when all the votes were counted on the following day, Trung Nguyen was leading by seven votes. Janet Nguyen requested a recount, and the final result was 10,919 votes for Janet Nguyen and 10,912 votes for Trung Nguyen. Janet Nguyen was certified the winner. However, Trung Nguyen's lawyers filed a lawsuit challenging the recount, alleging that the Registrar of Voters improperly voided votes for him and awarded votes to Janet Nguyen in the recount. The Board of Supervisors postponed inaugurating Janet Nguyen pending the lawsuit. On March 26, she was named the winner, winning by just 3 votes. She was sworn into office on March 27, 2007.

In light of her initial election's closeness in 2007, it was widely expected that Janet Nguyen would be forced into a November 2008 run-off election, especially when rumors emerged that she accepted campaign funds from a supposed communist sympathizer. However, after throwing similar accusations of communist ties back at opponent Van Tran, Janet Nguyen won 56.6% of the vote in the June 2008 election, winning the supervisorial district election outright and avoiding a November run-off. Garden Grove City Councilwoman Dina Nguyen, a fellow Republican who received the strong support of Assemblyman Van Tran and his machine (including former candidate, Trung Nguyen), won only 27.7% of the vote, while Democratic activist Hoa Van Tran won 15.7% of the vote.

During her first tenure as County Supervisor, Janet Nguyen spearheaded an effort in 2010 to allocate $350,000 of county park funds for the construction of a Vietnamese American and U.S. history memorial at Roger Stanton Park in Midway City.

However, Janet Nguyen also attracted criticism after an Orange County Grand Jury report suggested that the departure of top executives from the county's public health insurer CalOptima was the result of Nguyen attempting to use her position on CalOptima's Board of Directors "for political gain." The report further criticized Nguyen for allowing lobbyists from the Hospital Association of Southern California to amend the county ordinance governing CalOptima to reduce the influence of program beneficiaries while increasing the control of health care providers. Janet Nguyen also attracted the attention of the U.S. Federal Bureau of Investigation in 2013, which was investigating Nguyen's political fundraising activities in relation to county contractors.

=== California State Senate (2014–2018) ===
In her first State Senate term from 2014 to 2018, she represented the old 34th District, before narrowly losing reelection to Tom Umberg.

In 2014, incumbent Democratic State Senator Lou Correa was term-limited, creating a vacancy. Republican leaders quickly rallied around Nguyen while the state Democratic establishment rallied around former state Assemblyman Jose Solorio. The ensuing election was the most expensive in the state, and at times featured accusations and aggressive negative advertising. The vote was expected to be close, but Nguyen won the November election by a 58% to 42% margin, surprising even her fellow Republicans. She became the first State Senator of Vietnamese ancestry in American history.

On February 23, 2017, Senator Nguyen was forcibly removed from the Senate floor during an attempt to criticize the late California Sen. Tom Hayden and called him a communist. She rose to criticize his stance as "an outspoken critic of the Vietnam War [who] made celebrated trips to North Vietnam and Cambodia, offering to help broker a peaceful end." She spoke first in Vietnamese and then in English, all whilst repeatedly being told by presiding Sen. Ricardo Lara, D-Bell Gardens, that she was out of order. After she continued speaking her microphone was turned off. Senator Nguyen continued anyway, and Lara later ordered a sergeant-at-arms to escort her out of the room. The entire episode was caught on video, and elicited serious criticism from the Senate GOP Caucus, particularly in the shadow of a similar censure of U.S. Senator Elizabeth Warren during the confirmation hearings of Jeff Sessions. For her actions, the Los Angeles Times referred to Nguyen as "a rising Republican star", while the Huffington Post supported the actions of the legislative body to stop Nguyen from speaking.

In 2018, Nguyen was challenged for re-election by Democratic former state Assemblyman Tom Umberg. In a major upset, Nguyen was narrowly defeated in the general election.

=== California State Assembly (2020–2022) ===
She was a member of the California State Assembly for the old 72nd district from 2020 to 2022, encompassing parts of northern coastal Orange County.

In 2020, Nguyen ran for the seat in California State Assembly's 72nd district. She placed first in the primary, helping unseat incumbent Republican Tyler Diep, who placed third and thus could not advance to the general election. In the general election, she defeated the Democrat, Garden Grove City Councilwoman Diedre Nguyen (no relation) by 8%.

In 2021, she supported the recall of the current governor of California, Gavin Newsom.

=== Return to the California State Senate (2022–2024) ===
On December 21, 2021, Nguyen announced that she would be a candidate for the newly-created State Senate District 36. She won the November 2022 general election against Democrat Kim Carr with 56.9% of the vote. State Senate District 36 includes coastal Orange County, Little Saigon, and parts of Los Angeles County.

During her second tenure in the California State Senate, Janet Nguyen introduced 55 bills and resolutions, the majority of which focused on improving animal welfare, addressing health insurance issues, and uplifting Vietnamese-American anti-communist efforts. For example, Nguyen authored SB 1478, which creates standard guidance for veterinary practices in animal shelters, and SB 1407, which authorizes the planning and construction of a monument honoring the "survivors and victims of communism" on the grounds of the State Capitol, both of which were signed into law by the governor.

=== Return to the Orange County Board of Supervisors (2024–present) ===
In 2024, Nguyen ran successfully for the Orange County Board of Supervisors in District 1. She took office on December 4, 2024, filling the vacancy left by Andrew Do's resignation following pleading guilty to bribery. Capitalizing on the fallout from Do's corruption scandal, Nguyen ran on a platform that focused on anti-corruption reforms, increasing local law enforcement spending, auditing county mental health and homelessness programs, and supporting "the Border Wall and Beefed up Border Security."

== Electoral history ==
=== Orange County Supervisor ===
2007 Orange County Supervisor 1st district special election
Party	Candidate	Votes	%
Republican	Janet Nguyen	10,919	24.1
Republican	Trung Nguyen	10,912	24.1
Democratic	Tom Umberg	9,725	21.4
Republican	Carlos Bustamante	7,460	16.5
Democratic	Mark Rosen	2,181	4.8
Republican	Brett Elliott Franklin	1,739	3.8
Republican	Kermit Marsh	1,335	2.9
Republican	Larry Phan	417	0.9
Republican	Lupe Moreno	383	0.8
Democratic	Benny Diaz	273	0.6
Total votes		45,343	100.0

2008 Orange County Supervisor 1st district election
Party	Candidate	Votes	%
Republican	Janet Nguyen (incumbent)	21,350	56.6
Republican	Dina Nguyen	10,465	27.7
Democratic	Hoa Van Tran	5,928	15.7
Total votes		37,743	100.0

2012 Orange County Supervisor 1st district election
Party	Candidate	Votes	%
Republican	Janet Nguyen (incumbent)	37,106	74.2
Independent	Steve Rocco	12,902	25.8
Total votes		50,008	100.0

2024 Orange County Supervisor 1st district election
Party	Candidate	Votes	%
Nonpartisan	Janet Nguyen	160,036	61.2
Nonpartisan	Frances Marquez	101,296	38.8
Total votes		261,332	100.0

=== California State Legislature ===
2014 California State Senate 34th district election
Primary election
Party	Candidate	Votes	%
Republican	Janet Nguyen	46,445	52.0
Democratic	Jose Solorio	29,793	33.3
Republican	Long Pham	13,102	14.7
Total votes		89,340	100.0
General election
Republican	Janet Nguyen	95,792	58.1
Democratic	Jose Solorio	69,220	41.9
Total votes		165,012	100.0
Republican gain from Democratic			

2018 California State Senate 34th district election
Primary election
Party	Candidate	Votes	%
Republican	Janet Nguyen (incumbent)	82,874	58.3
Democratic	Tom Umberg	37,360	26.3
Democratic	Jestin L. Samson	13,231	9.3
Democratic	Akash A. Hawkins	8,746	6.1
Total votes		142,211	100.0
General election
Democratic	Tom Umberg	135,062	50.6
Republican	Janet Nguyen (incumbent)	131,973	49.4
Total votes		267,035	100.0
Democratic gain from Republican			

2020 California's 72nd State Assembly district primary results by county supervisorial district Map legend: J. Nguyen—30–40%

2020 California State Assembly 72nd district election
Primary election
Party	Candidate	Votes	%
Republican	Janet Nguyen	39,778	33.8
Democratic	Diedre Nguyen	30,021	25.5
Republican	Tyler Diep (incumbent)	29,186	24.8
Democratic	Bijan Mohseni	18,668	15.9
Total votes		117,163	100.0
General election
Republican	Janet Nguyen	122,483	54.2
Democratic	Diedre Nguyen	103,707	45.8
Total votes		226,190	100.0
Republican hold			

2022 California State Senate 36th district election
Primary election
Party	Candidate	Votes	%
Republican	Janet Nguyen	125,053	56.7
Democratic	Kim Carr	95,655	43.3
Total votes		220,708	100.0
General election
Republican	Janet Nguyen	196,488	56.9
Democratic	Kim Carr	149,114	43.1
Total votes		345,602	100.0
Republican hold			
