= Members of the California State Legislature =

These are tables of members of the California State Legislature (California State Senate and California State Assembly).

Background colors show their stated political party affiliation, according to the following table:

Democratic
Green
Independent
Progressive
ReformUSA
Republican

== California State Senate ==
Senate Session	District																																							
Senate Session	1st	2nd	3rd	4th	5th	6th	7th	8th	9th	10th	11th	12th	13th	14th	15th	16th	17th	18th	19th	20th	21st	22nd	23rd	24th	25th	26th	27th	28th	29th	30th	31st	32nd	33rd	34th	35th	36th	37th	38th	39th	40th
36th (1905)	Thomas Selvage	Clifford Coggins	John Irish	John Stanford	Benjamin F. Rush	Marshall Diggs	James McKee	Edward F. Woodward	Charles Belshaw	William C. Ralston, Jr.	August Muenter	John Curtin	John Mattos	M. W. Simpson	George Lukens	Frank W. Leavitt	Frank Markey	Harry Bunkers	Richard J. Welch	Frank French	Edward I. Wolfe	Hamilton Bauer	George Keane	Philip Haskins	John H. Nelson	Chester Rowell	Eli Wright	Charles Shortridge	Samuel H. Rambo	William T. Leeke	Henry W. Lynch	E. J. Emmons	Charles Greenwell	William H. Savage	Howard Broughton	Benjamin Hahn	Henry E. Carter	Cornelius Pendleton	John M. Anderson	Martin Ward
37th (1907)	George Rolley	Abner Weed	John Irish	John Stanford	Benjamin F. Rush	Albert Boynton	James McKee	Walter F. Price	Charles Belshaw	Anthony Caminetti	August Muenter	John Curtin	John Mattos	Clem Bates	George Lukens	Frank W. Leavitt	Frank Markey	Daniel Reily	Richard J. Welch	Thomas J. Kennedy	Edward I. Wolfe	Gus Hartman	George Keane	Marc Anthony	John H. Nelson	George W. Cartwright	George S. Walker	Marshall Black	Samuel H. Rambo	Henry M. Willis	Henry W. Lynch	E. O. Miller	Charles Greenwell	William H. Savage	Howard Broughton	Charles W. Bell	Henry Hurd	H. S. G. McCartney	John M. Anderson	Leroy Wright
38th (1909)	Charles Cutten	Abner Weed	E. S. Birdsall	John Stanford	Benjamin F. Rush	Albert Boynton	Charles Bills	Walter F. Price	Ennio Martinelli	Anthony Caminetti	John T. Lewis	John Curtin	Edward Strobridge	Clem Bates	John W. Stetson	Frank W. Leavitt	Thomas Finn	Daniel Reily	Richard J. Welch	Thomas J. Kennedy	Edward I. Wolfe	Gus Hartman	John P. Hare	Marc Anthony	Lester Burnett	George W. Cartwright	George S. Walker	Marshall Black	James Holohan	Henry M. Willis	Archibald E. Campbell	E. O. Miller	Louis Roseberry	William H. Savage	Newton Thompson	Charles W. Bell	Henry Hurd	H. S. G. McCartney	Miguel Estudillo	Leroy Wright
39th (1911)	Charles Cutten	T. W. H. Shanahan	E. S. Birdsall	John Stanford	Benjamin F. Rush	Albert Boynton	Charles Bills	Louis Juilliard	Ennio Martinelli	Anthony Caminetti	John T. Lewis	John Curtin	Edward Strobridge	George Hans	John W. Stetson	Edward J. Tyrrell	Thomas Finn	Daniel Regan	Richard J. Welch	Edward F. Bryant	Edward I. Wolfe	John J. Cassidy	John P. Hare	Dominick Beban	Lester Burnett	George W. Cartwright	George S. Walker	Marshall Black	James Holohan	John Avey	Archibald E. Campbell	E. O. Larkins	Louis Roseberry	Lee Gates	Newton Thompson	Charles W. Bell	Henry Hurd	Leslie R. Hewitt	Miguel Estudillo	Leroy Wright
40th (1913)	William Kehoe	T. W. H. Shanahan	E. S. Birdsall	John Stanford	Benjamin F. Rush	Albert Boynton	Philip Cohn	Louis Juilliard	James C. Owens	Anthony Caminetti	William Flint	John Curtin	Edward Strobridge	George Hans	Arthur H. Breed, Sr.	Edward J. Tyrrell	Archibald E. Campbell	Daniel Regan	Edwin Grant	Edward F. Bryant	Fred Gerdes	John J. Cassidy	Thomas Finn	Dominick Beban	David Mott	George W. Cartwright	Frank H. Benson	Marshall Black	Henry Lyon	John Avey	Edwin Butler	E. O. Larkins	Prescott Cogswell	Lee Gates	Newton Thompson	William J. Carr	William E. Brown	Leslie R. Hewitt	John N. Anderson	Leroy Wright
41st (1915)	William Kehoe	William Shearer	E. S. Birdsall	Claude Purkett	Benjamin F. Rush	W. E. Duncan, Jr.	Philip Cohn	Herbert W. Slater	James C. Owens	J. W. Stuckenbrack	William Flint	L. J. Maddux	Edward Strobridge	George Hans	Arthur H. Breed, Sr.	Edward J. Tyrrell	Archibald E. Campbell	Dominick Beban	Edwin Grant	William Seward Scott	Fred Gerdes	John Joseph Crowley	Thomas Finn	Lawrence J. Flaherty	David Mott	W. F. Chandler	Frank H. Benson	Herbert C. Jones	Henry Lyon	Lyman King	Edwin Butler	J. L. C. Irwin	Prescott Cogswell	Henry S. Benedict	Newton Thompson	William J. Carr	William E. Brown	John W. Ballard	John N. Anderson	Edgar Luce
42nd (1917)	William Kehoe	William Shearer	Thomas Ingram	Claude Purkett	Benjamin F. Rush	W. E. Duncan, Jr.	J. M. Inman	Herbert W. Slater	William Richard Sharkey	J. W. Stuckenbrack	M. B. Johnson	L. J. Maddux	Frank Carr	George Hans	Arthur H. Breed, Sr.	Edward J. Tyrrell	Elmer Rigdon	Victor Canepa	Lester Burnett	William Seward Scott	James Nealon	John Joseph Crowley	Walter A. McDonald	Lawrence J. Flaherty	J. R. Thompson	W. F. Chandler	Frank H. Benson	Herbert C. Jones	Henry Lyon	Lyman King	Harry A. Chamberlin	J. L. C. Irwin	Joseph Rominger	Henry S. Benedict	Egbert Gates	William J. Carr	William E. Brown	John W. Ballard	S. C. Evans	Edgar Luce
43rd (1919)	William Kehoe	William Shearer	Thomas Ingram	Claude Purkett	Benjamin F. Rush	W. E. Duncan, Jr.	J. M. Inman	Herbert W. Slater	William Richard Sharkey	Frank Boggs	M. B. Johnson	Lewis Dennett	Frank Carr	Edwin Otis	Arthur H. Breed, Sr.	A. P. Anderson	Elmer Rigdon	Victor Canepa	Lester Burnett	William Seward Scott	James Nealon	John Joseph Crowley	Walter A. McDonald	Lawrence J. Flaherty	J. R. Thompson	M. B. Harris	Frank H. Benson	Herbert C. Jones	Dwight Hart	Lyman King	Harry A. Chamberlin	J. L. C. Irwin	Joseph Rominger	Charles W. Lyon	Egbert Gates	William J. Carr	William E. Brown	Henry H. Yonkin	S. C. Evans	Edward Sample
44th (1921)	H. C. Nelson	William Shearer	Thomas Ingram	Claude Purkett	Benjamin F. Rush	W. E. Duncan, Jr.	J. M. Inman	Herbert W. Slater	William Richard Sharkey	Frank Boggs	M. B. Johnson	Lewis Dennett	Frank Carr	Edwin Otis	Arthur H. Breed, Sr.	A. P. Anderson	Elmer Rigdon	Victor Canepa	Lester Burnett	William Seward Scott	Charles Godsil	John Joseph Crowley	Walter A. McDonald	Lawrence J. Flaherty	F. A. Arbuckle	M. B. Harris	A. E. Osborne	Herbert C. Jones	Dwight Hart	Lyman King	Harry A. Chamberlin	J. L. C. Irwin	Joseph Rominger	Charles W. Lyon	Egbert Gates	William J. Carr	Newton Allen	Henry H. Yonkin	Walter Eden	Edward Sample
45th (1923)	H. C. Nelson	F. J. Powers	Thomas Ingram	Fred Handy	Benjamin F. Rush	W. F. Gates	J. M. Inman	Herbert W. Slater	William Richard Sharkey	Frank Boggs	M. B. Johnson	Lewis Dennett	Frank Carr	T. C. West	Arthur H. Breed, Sr.	Edgar S. Hurley	Elmer Rigdon	Victor Canepa	Lester Burnett	P. J. Gray	Charles Godsil	John Joseph Crowley	Walter A. McDonald	Daniel C. Murphy	F. A. Arbuckle	M. B. Harris	A. E. Osborne	Herbert C. Jones	Dwight Hart	Ralph Swing	Harry A. Chamberlin	John Creighton	Joseph Rominger	Charles W. Lyon	Egbert Gates	A. Burlingame Johnson	Newton Allen	Charles H. V. Lewis	Walter Eden	Edward Sample
46th (1925)	H. C. Nelson	F. J. Powers	Thomas Ingram	Fred Handy	Benjamin F. Rush	W. F. Gates	J. M. Inman	Herbert W. Slater	William Richard Sharkey	Frank Boggs	M. B. Johnson	Lewis Dennett	E. H. Christian	T. C. West	Arthur H. Breed, Sr.	Edgar S. Hurley	C. C. Baker	Victor Canepa	Tallant Tubbs	P. J. Gray	Roy Fellom	John Joseph Crowley	Thomas A. Maloney	Daniel C. Murphy	J. James Hollister	M. B. Harris	William Sanborn Young	Herbert C. Jones	Joseph Pedrotti	Ralph Swing	Harry A. Chamberlin	John Creighton	Cadet Taylor	Charles W. Lyon	Herbert Johnston Evans	A. Burlingame Johnson	Newton Allen	Charles H. V. Lewis	Chester Kline	Edward Sample
47th (1927)	H. C. Nelson	James M. Allen	Thomas Ingram	Fred Handy	Benjamin F. Rush	Ray Jones	J. M. Inman	Herbert W. Slater	William Richard Sharkey	Frank Boggs	M. B. Johnson	J. C. Garrison	E. H. Christian	T. C. West	Arthur H. Breed, Sr.	Edgar S. Hurley	C. C. Baker	Victor Canepa	Tallant Tubbs	P. J. Gray	Roy Fellom	John Joseph Crowley	Thomas A. Maloney	Daniel C. Murphy	J. James Hollister	Charles H. Cobb	William Sanborn Young	Herbert C. Jones	Joseph Pedrotti	Ralph Swing	Harry A. Chamberlin	James Wagy	Cadet Taylor	Charles W. Lyon	Herbert Johnston Evans	Frank Weller	Newton Allen	J. W. McKinley	Chester Kline	Edwin A. Mueller
48th (1929)	H. C. Nelson	James M. Allen	Bert Cassidy	Fred Handy	Thomas McCormack	Ray Jones	J. M. Inman	Herbert W. Slater	William Richard Sharkey	Frank Boggs	George C. Cleveland	J. C. Garrison	E. H. Christian	T. C. West	Arthur H. Breed, Sr.	Edgar S. Hurley	C. C. Baker	Victor Canepa	Tallant Tubbs	P. J. Gray	Roy Fellom	John Joseph Crowley	Thomas A. Maloney	Daniel C. Murphy	Walter Duval	Charles H. Cobb	William Sanborn Young	Herbert C. Jones	Joseph Pedrotti	Ralph Swing	Henry E. Carter	James Wagy	Frank Merriam	Charles W. Lyon	Herbert Johnston Evans	Frank Weller	George W. Rochester	J. W. McKinley	Nelson Edwards	Edwin A. Mueller
49th (1931)	H. C. Nelson	James M. Allen	Bert Cassidy	R. R. Ingels	Thomas McCormack	Charles Deuel	J. M. Inman	John L. Moran	William Richard Sharkey	William P. Rich	George C. Cleveland	Herbert W. Slater	E. H. Christian	Roy Fellom		Arthur H. Breed, Sr.	C. C. Baker	Herbert C. Jones	Tallant Tubbs	Bradford Crittenden		David F. Bush	Thomas A. Maloney	Andrew Schottky	Walter Duval	Dan E. Williams	William Sanborn Young	Joe Riley	Joseph Pedrotti	Ray Hays	Henry E. Carter	Frank Mixter	Frank Merriam	James Wagy	Herbert Johnston Evans	Ralph Swing	George W. Rochester	J. W. McKinley	Nelson Edwards	William E. Harper
50th (1933)	Harold J. Powers	James M. Allen	Harry A. Perry	R. R. Ingels	John B. McColl	Charles Deuel	Jerrold Seawell	John L. Moran	A. L. Pierovich	William P. Rich	Frank L. Gordon	Herbert W. Slater	Charles Reindollar	Roy Fellom	Thomas McCormack	Arthur H. Breed, Sr.	William Richard Sharkey	Herbert C. Jones	J. M. Inman	Bradford Crittenden	Harry Parkman	David F. Bush	Bert Snyder	Andrew Schottky	Edward Tickle	Dan E. Williams	Charles King	Joe Riley	Chris N. Jespersen	Ray Hays	Edgar Stow	Frank Mixter	Walter Duval	James Wagy	Nelson Edwards	Ralph Swing	Leonard Difani	J. W. McKinley	Ben Hulse	William E. Harper
51st (1935)	Harold J. Powers	Henry McGuinness	Harry A. Perry	George Milton Biggar	John B. McColl	Charles Deuel	Jerrold Seawell	Jack Metzger	A. L. Pierovich	William P. Rich	Frank L. Gordon	Herbert W. Slater	Charles Reindollar	Walter McGovern	Thomas McCormack	William F. Knowland	William Richard Sharkey	William Sanborn Young	J. M. Inman	Bradford Crittenden	Harry Parkman	J. C. Garrison	Bert Snyder	Andrew Schottky	Edward Tickle	Dan E. Williams	Charles King	Karl Keough	Chris N. Jespersen	Ray Hays	Edgar Stow	Frank Mixter	Walter Duval	James Wagy	Nelson Edwards	Ralph Swing	Leonard Difani	Culbert Olson	Ben Hulse	Ed Fletcher
52nd (1937)	Harold J. Powers	James M. Allen	Irwin Quinn	George Milton Biggar	John B. McColl	Charles Deuel	Jerrold Seawell	Jack Metzger	A. L. Pierovich	William P. Rich	Frank L. Gordon	Herbert W. Slater	Thomas F. Keating	Walter McGovern	Thomas McCormack	William F. Knowland	Truman DeLap	William Sanborn Young	Roy J. Nielsen	Bradford Crittenden	Harry Parkman	J. C. Garrison	James Holohan	Andrew Schottky	Edward Tickle	Dan E. Williams	Robert Roy Cunningham	Karl Keough	Chris N. Jespersen	Ray Hays	J. James Hollister	Frank Mixter	James J. McBride	James Wagy	Harry Clay Westover	Ralph Swing	John J. Phillips	Culbert Olson	Edward H. Law	Ed Fletcher
53rd (1939)	Harold J. Powers	Randolph Collier	Irwin Quinn	George Milton Biggar	Jesse W. Carter	Charles Deuel	Jerrold Seawell	Jack Metzger	A. L. Pierovich	William P. Rich	Frank L. Gordon	Herbert W. Slater	Thomas F. Keating	John F. Shelley	Thomas McCormack	Arthur H. Breed, Jr.	Truman DeLap	John D. Foley	Roy J. Nielsen	Bradford Crittenden	Harry Parkman	J. C. Garrison	James Holohan	Peter Myhand	Edward Tickle	Jesse Mayo	Robert Roy Cunningham	Charles Brown	Chris N. Jespersen	Ray Hays	J. James Hollister	Frank Mixter	James J. McBride	James Wagy	Harry Clay Westover	Ralph Swing	John J. Phillips	Robert W. Kenny	Edward H. Law	Ed Fletcher
54th (1941)	Harold J. Powers	Randolph Collier	Irwin Quinn	George Milton Biggar	Oliver Jesse Carter	Charles Deuel	Jerrold Seawell	Jack Metzger	H. E. Dillinger	William P. Rich	Frank L. Gordon	Herbert W. Slater	Thomas F. Keating	John F. Shelley	Thomas McCormack	Arthur H. Breed, Jr.	Truman DeLap	John D. Foley	John Harold Swan	Bradford Crittenden	Harry Parkman	J. C. Garrison	H. R. Judah	Peter Myhand	Edward Tickle	Jesse Mayo	Robert Roy Cunningham	Charles Brown	Chris N. Jespersen	Ray Hays	Clarence Ward	Frank Mixter	James J. McBride	James Wagy	Thomas Kuchel	Ralph Swing	John J. Phillips	Robert W. Kenny	E. George Luckey	Ed Fletcher
55th (1943)	Harold J. Powers	Randolph Collier	Irwin Quinn	George Milton Biggar	Oliver Jesse Carter	Charles Deuel	Jerrold Seawell	Clair Engle	H. E. Dillinger	William P. Rich	Frank L. Gordon	Herbert W. Slater	Thomas F. Keating	John F. Shelley	Thomas McCormack	Arthur H. Breed, Jr.	Truman DeLap	Byrl Salsman	John Harold Swan	Bradford Crittenden	Harry Parkman	Hugh P. Donnelly	H. R. Judah	George J. Hatfield	Edward Tickle	Jesse Mayo	Robert Roy Cunningham	Charles Brown	Chris N. Jespersen	Hugh M. Burns	Clarence Ward	Frank Mixter	James J. McBride	Jess Dorsey	Thomas Kuchel	Ralph Swing	John J. Phillips	Jack Tenney	E. George Luckey	Ed Fletcher
56th (1945)	Harold J. Powers	Randolph Collier	Irwin Quinn	George Milton Biggar	Oliver Jesse Carter	Charles Deuel	Jerrold Seawell	Louis G. Sutton	H. E. Dillinger	William P. Rich	Frank L. Gordon	Herbert W. Slater	Thomas F. Keating	John F. Shelley	Thomas McCormack	Arthur H. Breed, Jr.	Truman DeLap	Byrl Salsman	Earl D. Desmond	Bradford Crittenden	Harry Parkman	Hugh P. Donnelly	H. R. Judah	George J. Hatfield	Frederick Weybret	Jesse Mayo	Robert Roy Cunningham	Charles Brown	Chris N. Jespersen	Hugh M. Burns	Clarence Ward	Frank Mixter	James J. McBride	Jess Dorsey	Thomas Kuchel	Ralph Swing	Nelson S. Dilworth	Jack Tenney	Ben Hulse	Ed Fletcher
1947	Harold J. Powers	Randolph Collier	Irwin Quinn	Burt Busch	Oliver Jesse Carter	Charles Deuel	Jerrold Seawell	Louis G. Sutton	H. E. Dillinger	William P. Rich	Frank L. Gordon	Herbert W. Slater	Thomas F. Keating	Gerald O'Gara	Thomas McCormack	Arthur H. Breed, Jr.	Truman DeLap	Byrl Salsman	Earl D. Desmond	Bradford Crittenden	Harry Parkman	Hugh P. Donnelly	H. R. Judah	George J. Hatfield	Frederick Weybret	Jesse Mayo	Robert Roy Cunningham	Charles Brown	Chris N. Jespersen	Hugh M. Burns	Clarence Ward	J. Howard Williams	James J. McBride	Jess Dorsey	Clyde A. Watson	Ralph Swing	Nelson S. Dilworth	Jack Tenney	Ben Hulse	Fred Kraft
1948	Harold J. Powers	Randolph Collier	Irwin Quinn	Burt Busch	Oliver Jesse Carter	Harry Drobish	Allen G. Thurman	Louis G. Sutton	H. E. Dillinger	William P. Rich	Frank L. Gordon	Clarence Tauzer	Thomas F. Keating	Gerald O'Gara	Thomas McCormack	Arthur H. Breed, Jr.	Truman DeLap	Byrl Salsman	Earl D. Desmond	Bradford Crittenden	Harry Parkman	Hugh P. Donnelly	H. R. Judah	George J. Hatfield	Frederick Weybret	Jesse Mayo	Robert Roy Cunningham	Charles Brown	Chris N. Jespersen	Hugh M. Burns	Clarence Ward	J. Howard Williams	James J. McBride	Jess Dorsey	Clyde A. Watson	Ralph Swing	Nelson S. Dilworth	Jack Tenney	Ben Hulse	Fred Kraft
1949	Harold J. Powers	Randolph Collier	Michael J. Burns	Burt Busch	Edwin J. Regan	Harry Drobish	Harold T. Johnson	Louis G. Sutton	H. E. Dillinger	William P. Rich	Nathan F. Coombs	F. Presley Abshire	Thomas F. Keating	Gerald O'Gara	Luther E. Gibson	Arthur H. Breed, Jr.	George Miller, Jr.	Byrl Salsman	Earl D. Desmond	Bradford Crittenden	Harry Parkman	Hugh P. Donnelly	H. R. Judah	George J. Hatfield	Frederick Weybret	Jesse Mayo	Robert Roy Cunningham	Charles Brown	Chris N. Jespersen	Hugh M. Burns	Clarence Ward	J. Howard Williams	James J. McBride	Jess Dorsey	Clyde A. Watson	Ralph Swing	Nelson S. Dilworth	Jack Tenney	Ben Hulse	Fred Kraft
1950	Harold J. Powers	Randolph Collier	Arthur W. Way	Burt Busch	Edwin J. Regan	Harry Drobish	Harold T. Johnson	Louis G. Sutton	H. E. Dillinger	William P. Rich	Nathan F. Coombs	F. Presley Abshire	Thomas F. Keating	Gerald O'Gara	Luther E. Gibson	Arthur H. Breed, Jr.	George Miller, Jr.	Byrl Salsman	Earl D. Desmond	Bradford Crittenden	Harry Parkman	Hugh P. Donnelly	H. R. Judah	George J. Hatfield	Frederick Weybret	Jesse Mayo	Robert Roy Cunningham	Charles Brown	Chris N. Jespersen	Hugh M. Burns	Clarence Ward	J. Howard Williams	James J. McBride	Jess Dorsey	Clyde A. Watson	Ralph Swing	Nelson S. Dilworth	Jack Tenney	Ben Hulse	Fred Kraft
1951	Harold J. Powers	Randolph Collier	Arthur W. Way	Burt Busch	Edwin J. Regan	Paul L. Byrne	Harold T. Johnson	Louis G. Sutton	H. E. Dillinger	Ed C. Johnson	Nathan F. Coombs	F. Presley Abshire	John F. McCarthy	Gerald O'Gara	Luther E. Gibson	Arthur H. Breed, Jr.	George Miller, Jr.	John F. Thompson	Earl D. Desmond	Verne Hoffman	Harry Parkman	Hugh P. Donnelly	H. R. Judah	George J. Hatfield	Frederick Weybret	Jesse Mayo	Robert Roy Cunningham	Charles Brown	Chris N. Jespersen	Hugh M. Burns	Clarence Ward	J. Howard Williams	James J. McBride	Jess Dorsey	Clyde A. Watson	James E. Cunningham	Nelson S. Dilworth	Jack Tenney	Ben Hulse	Fred Kraft
1952	Harold J. Powers	Randolph Collier	Arthur W. Way	Burt Busch	Edwin J. Regan	Paul L. Byrne	Harold T. Johnson	Louis G. Sutton	H. E. Dillinger	Ed C. Johnson	Nathan F. Coombs	F. Presley Abshire	John F. McCarthy	Gerald O'Gara	Luther E. Gibson	Arthur H. Breed, Jr.	George Miller, Jr.	John F. Thompson	Earl D. Desmond	Verne Hoffman	Harry Parkman	Hugh P. Donnelly	H. R. Judah	George J. Hatfield	Frederick Weybret	Jesse Mayo	Robert Roy Cunningham	Charles Brown	Chris N. Jespersen	Hugh M. Burns	Clarence Ward	J. Howard Williams	James J. McBride	Jess Dorsey	Clyde A. Watson	James E. Cunningham	Nelson S. Dilworth	Jack Tenney	Ben Hulse	Fred Kraft
1953	Harold J. Powers	Randolph Collier	Arthur W. Way	Burt Busch	Edwin J. Regan	Paul L. Byrne	Harold T. Johnson	Louis G. Sutton	Swift Berry	Ed C. Johnson	Nathan F. Coombs	F. Presley Abshire	John F. McCarthy	Gerald O'Gara	Luther E. Gibson	Arthur H. Breed, Jr.	George Miller, Jr.	John F. Thompson	Earl D. Desmond	Verne Hoffman	Harry Parkman	Hugh P. Donnelly	Donald L. Grunsky	George J. Hatfield	Frederick Weybret	Stephen Teale	Robert I. Montgomery	Charles Brown	Alan Erhart	Hugh M. Burns	Clarence Ward	J. Howard Williams	James J. McBride	Jess Dorsey	John A. Murdy, Jr.	James E. Cunningham	Nelson S. Dilworth	Jack Tenney	Ben Hulse	Fred Kraft
1954	Dale C. Williams	Randolph Collier	Arthur W. Way	Burt Busch	Edwin J. Regan	Paul L. Byrne	Harold T. Johnson	Louis G. Sutton	Swift Berry	Ed C. Johnson	Nathan F. Coombs	F. Presley Abshire	John F. McCarthy	Gerald O'Gara	Luther E. Gibson	Arthur H. Breed, Jr.	George Miller, Jr.	John F. Thompson	Earl D. Desmond	Verne Hoffman	Harry Parkman	Hugh P. Donnelly	Donald L. Grunsky	George J. Hatfield	Frederick Weybret	Stephen Teale	Robert I. Montgomery	Charles Brown	Alan Erhart	Hugh M. Burns	Clarence Ward	J. Howard Williams	James J. McBride	Jess Dorsey	John A. Murdy, Jr.	James E. Cunningham	Nelson S. Dilworth	Jack Tenney	Ben Hulse	Fred Kraft
1955	Dale C. Williams	Randolph Collier	Arthur W. Way	James Busch	Edwin J. Regan	Paul L. Byrne	Harold T. Johnson	Louis G. Sutton	Swift Berry	Ed C. Johnson	Nathan F. Coombs	F. Presley Abshire	John F. McCarthy	Robert McCarthy	Luther E. Gibson	Arthur H. Breed, Jr.	George Miller, Jr.	John F. Thompson	Earl D. Desmond	Alan Short	Harry Parkman	Hugh P. Donnelly	Donald L. Grunsky	James A. Cobey	Fred Farr	Stephen Teale	Robert I. Montgomery	Charles Brown	Alan Erhart	Hugh M. Burns	Clarence Ward	J. Howard Williams	James J. McBride	Jess Dorsey	John A. Murdy, Jr.	James E. Cunningham	Nelson S. Dilworth	Richard B. Richards	Ben Hulse	Fred Kraft
1956	Stanley Arnold	Randolph Collier	Arthur W. Way	James Busch	Edwin J. Regan	Paul L. Byrne	Harold T. Johnson	Louis G. Sutton	Swift Berry	Ed C. Johnson	Nathan F. Coombs	F. Presley Abshire	John F. McCarthy	Robert McCarthy	Luther E. Gibson	Arthur H. Breed, Jr.	George Miller, Jr.	John F. Thompson	Earl D. Desmond	Alan Short	Harry Parkman	Hugh P. Donnelly	Donald L. Grunsky	James A. Cobey	Fred Farr	Stephen Teale	Robert I. Montgomery	Charles Brown	Alan Erhart	Hugh M. Burns	John J. Hollister, Jr.	J. Howard Williams	James J. McBride	Jess Dorsey	John A. Murdy, Jr.	James E. Cunningham	Nelson S. Dilworth	Richard B. Richards	Ben Hulse	Fred Kraft
1957	Stanley Arnold	Randolph Collier	Carl L. Christensen Jr.	James Busch	Edwin J. Regan	Paul L. Byrne	Harold T. Johnson	Louis G. Sutton	Swift Berry	Ed C. Johnson	Nathan F. Coombs	F. Presley Abshire	John F. McCarthy	Robert McCarthy	Luther E. Gibson	Arthur H. Breed, Jr.	George Miller, Jr.	John F. Thompson	Earl D. Desmond	Alan Short	Richard J. Dolwig	Hugh P. Donnelly	Donald L. Grunsky	James A. Cobey	Fred Farr	Stephen Teale	Robert I. Montgomery	Charles Brown	Alan Erhart	Hugh M. Burns	John J. Hollister, Jr.	J. Howard Williams	James J. McBride	Jess Dorsey	John A. Murdy, Jr.	James E. Cunningham	Nelson S. Dilworth	Richard B. Richards	John William Beard	Fred Kraft
1958	Stanley Arnold	Randolph Collier	Carl L. Christensen Jr.	James Busch	Edwin J. Regan	Paul L. Byrne	Harold T. Johnson	Louis G. Sutton	Swift Berry	Ed C. Johnson	Nathan F. Coombs	F. Presley Abshire	John F. McCarthy	Robert McCarthy	Luther E. Gibson	Arthur H. Breed, Jr.	George Miller, Jr.	John F. Thompson	Earl D. Desmond	Alan Short	Richard J. Dolwig	Hugh P. Donnelly	Donald L. Grunsky	James A. Cobey	Fred Farr	Stephen Teale	Robert I. Montgomery	Charles Brown	Alan Erhart	Hugh M. Burns	John J. Hollister, Jr.	J. Howard Williams	James J. McBride	Jess Dorsey	John A. Murdy, Jr.	James E. Cunningham	Nelson S. Dilworth	Richard B. Richards	John William Beard	Fred Kraft
1959	Stanley Arnold	Randolph Collier	Carl L. Christensen Jr.	Waverly Jack Slattery	Edwin J. Regan	Paul L. Byrne	Ronald G. Cameron	Louis G. Sutton	Swift Berry	Ed C. Johnson	Nathan F. Coombs	F. Presley Abshire	John F. McCarthy	J. Eugene McAteer	Luther E. Gibson	John W. Holmdahl	George Miller, Jr.	John F. Thompson	Albert S. Rodda	Alan Short	Richard J. Dolwig	Hugh P. Donnelly	Donald L. Grunsky	James A. Cobey	Fred Farr	Stephen Teale	Robert I. Montgomery	Charles Brown	Alan Erhart	Hugh M. Burns	John J. Hollister, Jr.	J. Howard Williams	James J. McBride	Walter W. Stiern	John A. Murdy, Jr.	Stanford C. Shaw	Nelson S. Dilworth	Richard B. Richards	John William Beard	Fred Kraft
1960	Stanley Arnold	Randolph Collier	Carl L. Christensen Jr.	Waverly Jack Slattery	Edwin J. Regan	Paul L. Byrne	Ronald G. Cameron	Louis G. Sutton	Swift Berry	Ed C. Johnson	Nathan F. Coombs	F. Presley Abshire	John F. McCarthy	J. Eugene McAteer	Luther E. Gibson	John W. Holmdahl	George Miller, Jr.	John F. Thompson	Albert S. Rodda	Alan Short	Richard J. Dolwig	Hugh P. Donnelly	Donald L. Grunsky	James A. Cobey	Fred Farr	Stephen Teale	Robert I. Montgomery	Charles Brown	Alan Erhart	Hugh M. Burns	John J. Hollister, Jr.	J. Howard Williams	James J. McBride	Walter W. Stiern	John A. Murdy, Jr.	Stanford C. Shaw	Nelson S. Dilworth	Richard B. Richards	John William Beard	Fred Kraft
1961	Stanley Arnold	Randolph Collier	Carl L. Christensen Jr.	Waverly Jack Slattery	Edwin J. Regan	Paul L. Byrne	Ronald G. Cameron	Louis G. Sutton	John C. Begovich	Ed C. Johnson	Samuel R. Geddes	Joseph A. Rattigan	John F. McCarthy	J. Eugene McAteer	Luther E. Gibson	John W. Holmdahl	George Miller, Jr.	John F. Thompson	Albert S. Rodda	Alan Short	Richard J. Dolwig	Hugh P. Donnelly	Donald L. Grunsky	James A. Cobey	Fred Farr	Stephen Teale	Robert D. Williams	Charles Brown	Vernon L. Sturgeon	Hugh M. Burns	John J. Hollister, Jr.	J. Howard Williams	James J. McBride	Walter W. Stiern	John A. Murdy, Jr.	Stanford C. Shaw	Lee Backstrand	Richard B. Richards	Aaron W. Quick	Hugo Fisher
1962	Stanley Arnold	Randolph Collier	Carl L. Christensen Jr.	Waverly Jack Slattery	Edwin J. Regan	Paul L. Byrne	Ronald G. Cameron	Louis G. Sutton	John C. Begovich	Ed C. Johnson	Samuel R. Geddes	Joseph A. Rattigan	John F. McCarthy	J. Eugene McAteer	Luther E. Gibson	John W. Holmdahl	George Miller, Jr.	John F. Thompson	Albert S. Rodda	Alan Short	Richard J. Dolwig	Hugh P. Donnelly	Donald L. Grunsky	James A. Cobey	Fred Farr	Stephen Teale	Robert D. Williams	Charles Brown	Vernon L. Sturgeon	Hugh M. Burns	Alvin C. Weingand	J. Howard Williams	James J. McBride	Walter W. Stiern	John A. Murdy, Jr.	Stanford C. Shaw	Lee Backstrand	Richard B. Richards	Aaron W. Quick	Hugo Fisher
1963	Stanley Arnold	Randolph Collier	Carl L. Christensen Jr.	Frank S. Petersen	Edwin J. Regan	Stan Pittman	Ronald G. Cameron	Virgil O'Sullivan	John C. Begovich	Harold Thomas Sedgwick	Samuel R. Geddes	Joseph A. Rattigan	John F. McCarthy	J. Eugene McAteer	Luther E. Gibson	John W. Holmdahl	George Miller, Jr.	Clark L. Bradley	Albert S. Rodda	Alan Short	Richard J. Dolwig	Hugh P. Donnelly	Donald L. Grunsky	James A. Cobey	Fred Farr	Stephen Teale	Robert D. Williams	William Symons, Jr.	Vernon L. Sturgeon	Hugh M. Burns	Alvin C. Weingand	Howard Way	Robert J. Lagomarsino	Walter W. Stiern	John A. Murdy, Jr.	Eugene G. Nisbet	Lee Backstrand	Thomas M. Rees	Aaron W. Quick	Jack Schrade
1964	Stanley Arnold	Randolph Collier	Carl L. Christensen Jr.	Frank S. Petersen	Edwin J. Regan	Stan Pittman	Paul J. Lunardi	Virgil O'Sullivan	John C. Begovich	Harold Thomas Sedgwick	Samuel R. Geddes	Joseph A. Rattigan	John F. McCarthy	J. Eugene McAteer	Luther E. Gibson	John W. Holmdahl	George Miller, Jr.	Clark L. Bradley	Albert S. Rodda	Alan Short	Richard J. Dolwig	Hugh P. Donnelly	Donald L. Grunsky	James A. Cobey	Fred Farr	Stephen Teale	Robert D. Williams	William Symons, Jr.	Vernon L. Sturgeon	Hugh M. Burns	Alvin C. Weingand	Howard Way	Robert J. Lagomarsino	Walter W. Stiern	John A. Murdy, Jr.	Eugene G. Nisbet	Lee Backstrand	Thomas M. Rees	Aaron W. Quick	Jack Schrade
1965	Stanley Arnold	Randolph Collier	Carl L. Christensen Jr.	Frank S. Petersen	Fred W. Marler, Jr.	Stan Pittman	Paul J. Lunardi	Virgil O'Sullivan	John C. Begovich	Harold Thomas Sedgwick	Samuel R. Geddes	Joseph A. Rattigan	John F. McCarthy	J. Eugene McAteer	Luther E. Gibson	John W. Holmdahl	George Miller, Jr.	Clark L. Bradley	Albert S. Rodda	Alan Short	Richard J. Dolwig	Hugh P. Donnelly	Donald L. Grunsky	James A. Cobey	Fred Farr	Stephen Teale	Robert D. Williams	William Symons, Jr.	Vernon L. Sturgeon	Hugh M. Burns	Alvin C. Weingand	Howard Way	Robert J. Lagomarsino	Walter W. Stiern	John G. Schmitz	Eugene G. Nisbet	Gordon Cologne	Thomas M. Rees	Aaron W. Quick	Jack Schrade
1966	Stanley Arnold	Randolph Collier	Carl L. Christensen Jr.	Frank S. Petersen	Fred W. Marler, Jr.	Stan Pittman	Paul J. Lunardi	Virgil O'Sullivan	John C. Begovich	Harold Thomas Sedgwick	Samuel R. Geddes	Joseph A. Rattigan	John F. McCarthy	J. Eugene McAteer	Luther E. Gibson	John W. Holmdahl	George Miller, Jr.	Clark L. Bradley	Albert S. Rodda	Alan Short	Richard J. Dolwig	Hugh P. Donnelly	Donald L. Grunsky	James A. Cobey	Fred Farr	Stephen Teale	Robert D. Williams	William Symons, Jr.	Vernon L. Sturgeon	Hugh M. Burns	Alvin C. Weingand	Howard Way	Robert J. Lagomarsino	Walter W. Stiern	John G. Schmitz	Eugene G. Nisbet	Gordon Cologne	Thomas M. Rees	Aaron W. Quick	Jack Schrade
1967	Randolph Collier	Fred W. Marler, Jr.	Stephen Teale	John F. McCarthy	Albert S. Rodda	Alan Short	George Miller, Jr.	Lewis F. Sherman	J. Eugene McAteer	George Moscone	Nicholas C. Petris	Richard J. Dolwig	Alfred Alquist	Clark L. Bradley	Howard Way	Hugh M. Burns	Donald L. Grunsky	Walter W. Stiern	H. L. Richardson	William Coombs	John L. Harmer	Tom C. Carrell	Lou Cusanovich	Robert J. Lagomarsino	Robert S. Stevens	Anthony Beilenson	George E. Danielson	Alfred H. Song	Mervyn Dymally	Lawrence E. Walsh	James Q. Wedworth	Ralph C. Dills	Joseph M. Kennick	John G. Schmitz	James Edward Whetmore	Gordon Cologne	George Deukmejian	Clair Burgener	Jack Schrade	James R. Mills
1968	Randolph Collier	Fred W. Marler, Jr.	Stephen Teale	John F. McCarthy	Albert S. Rodda	Alan Short	George Miller, Jr.	Lewis F. Sherman	Milton Marks	George Moscone	Nicholas C. Petris	Richard J. Dolwig	Alfred Alquist	Clark L. Bradley	Howard Way	Hugh M. Burns	Donald L. Grunsky	Walter W. Stiern	H. L. Richardson	William Coombs	John L. Harmer	Tom C. Carrell	Lou Cusanovich	Robert J. Lagomarsino	Robert S. Stevens	Anthony Beilenson	George E. Danielson	Alfred H. Song	Mervyn Dymally	Lawrence E. Walsh	James Q. Wedworth	Ralph C. Dills	Joseph M. Kennick	John G. Schmitz	James Edward Whetmore	Gordon Cologne	George Deukmejian	Clair Burgener	Jack Schrade	James R. Mills
1969	Randolph Collier	Fred W. Marler, Jr.	Stephen Teale	John F. McCarthy	Albert S. Rodda	Alan Short	George Miller, Jr.	Lewis F. Sherman	Milton Marks	George Moscone	Nicholas C. Petris	Richard J. Dolwig	Alfred Alquist	Clark L. Bradley	Howard Way	Hugh M. Burns	Donald L. Grunsky	Walter W. Stiern	H. L. Richardson	William Coombs	John L. Harmer	Tom C. Carrell	Lou Cusanovich	Robert J. Lagomarsino	Robert S. Stevens	Anthony Beilenson	George E. Danielson	Alfred H. Song	Mervyn Dymally	Lawrence E. Walsh	James Q. Wedworth	Ralph C. Dills	Joseph M. Kennick	John G. Schmitz	James Edward Whetmore	Gordon Cologne	George Deukmejian	Clair Burgener	Jack Schrade	James R. Mills
1970	Randolph Collier	Fred W. Marler, Jr.	Stephen Teale	John F. McCarthy	Albert S. Rodda	Alan Short	George Miller, Jr.	Lewis F. Sherman	Milton Marks	George Moscone	Nicholas C. Petris	Richard J. Dolwig	Alfred Alquist	Clark L. Bradley	Howard Way	Hugh M. Burns	Donald L. Grunsky	Walter W. Stiern	H. L. Richardson	William Coombs	John L. Harmer	Tom C. Carrell	Lou Cusanovich	Robert J. Lagomarsino	Robert S. Stevens	Anthony Beilenson	George E. Danielson	Alfred H. Song	Mervyn Dymally	Lawrence E. Walsh	James Q. Wedworth	Ralph C. Dills	Joseph M. Kennick	John G. Schmitz	James Edward Whetmore	Gordon Cologne	George Deukmejian	Clair Burgener	Jack Schrade	James R. Mills
1971	Randolph Collier	Fred W. Marler, Jr.	Stephen Teale	Peter H. Behr	Albert S. Rodda	Alan Short	John A. Nejedly	John W. Holmdahl	Milton Marks	George Moscone	Nicholas C. Petris	Arlen F. Gregorio	Alfred Alquist	Clark L. Bradley	Howard Way	George Zenovich	Donald L. Grunsky	Walter W. Stiern	H. L. Richardson	William Coombs	John L. Harmer	Tom C. Carrell	Lou Cusanovich	Robert J. Lagomarsino	Robert S. Stevens	Anthony Beilenson	George E. Danielson	Alfred H. Song	Mervyn Dymally	Lawrence E. Walsh	James Q. Wedworth	Ralph C. Dills	Joseph M. Kennick	Dennis Carpenter	James Edward Whetmore	Gordon Cologne	George Deukmejian	Clair Burgener	Jack Schrade	James R. Mills
1972	Randolph Collier	Fred W. Marler, Jr.	Stephen Teale	Peter H. Behr	Albert S. Rodda	Alan Short	John A. Nejedly	John W. Holmdahl	Milton Marks	George Moscone	Nicholas C. Petris	Arlen F. Gregorio	Alfred Alquist	Clark L. Bradley	Howard Way	George Zenovich	Donald L. Grunsky	Walter W. Stiern	H. L. Richardson	William Coombs	John L. Harmer	Tom C. Carrell	Lou Cusanovich	Robert J. Lagomarsino	Robert S. Stevens	Anthony Beilenson	George E. Danielson	Alfred H. Song	Mervyn Dymally	Lawrence E. Walsh	James Q. Wedworth	Ralph C. Dills	Joseph M. Kennick	Dennis Carpenter	James Edward Whetmore	Gordon Cologne	George Deukmejian	Clair Burgener	Jack Schrade	James R. Mills
1973–1974	Randolph Collier	Fred W. Marler, Jr.	Clare Berryhill	Peter H. Behr	Albert S. Rodda	Alan Short	John A. Nejedly	John W. Holmdahl	Milton Marks	George Moscone	Nicholas C. Petris	Arlen F. Gregorio	Alfred Alquist	Clark L. Bradley	Howard Way	George Zenovich	Donald L. Grunsky	Walter W. Stiern	H. L. Richardson	William Coombs	John L. Harmer	Alan Robbins	Lou Cusanovich	Robert J. Lagomarsino	Robert S. Stevens	Anthony Beilenson	David A. Roberti	Alfred H. Song	Mervyn Dymally	Lawrence E. Walsh	James Q. Wedworth	Ralph C. Dills	Joseph M. Kennick	Dennis Carpenter	James Edward Whetmore	W. Craig Biddle	George Deukmejian	John Stull	Jack Schrade	James R. Mills
1975–1976	Randolph Collier	Peter H. Behr	Clare Berryhill	John F. Dunlap	Albert S. Rodda	George Moscone	John A. Nejedly	John W. Holmdahl	Milton Marks	Arlen F. Gregorio	Nicholas C. Petris	Jerry Smith	Alfred Alquist	George Zenovich	Howard Way	Walter W. Stiern	Donald L. Grunsky	Omer L. Rains	H. L. Richardson	Alan Robbins	Newton Russell	Anthony Beilenson	Lou Cusanovich	Alex P. Garcia	Robert S. Stevens	Alfred H. Song	David A. Roberti	Ralph C. Dills	Bill Greene	Nate Holden	James Q. Wedworth	Ruben S. Ayala	Joseph M. Kennick	Robert Presley	James Edward Whetmore	Dennis Carpenter	George Deukmejian	John Stull	Jack Schrade	James R. Mills
1977–1978	Ray E. Johnson	Peter H. Behr	Albert S. Rodda	John F. Dunlap	Milton Marks	John Francis Foran	John A. Nejedly	John W. Holmdahl	Nicholas C. Petris	Arlen F. Gregorio	Alfred Alquist	Jerry Smith	John Garamendi	George Zenovich	Rose Ann Vuich	Walter W. Stiern	Robert P. Nimmo	Omer L. Rains	Lou Cusanovich	Alan Robbins	Newton Russell	Alan Sieroty	David A. Roberti	Alex P. Garcia	H. L. Richardson	Alfred H. Song	Robert G. Beverly	Ralph C. Dills	Bill Greene	Nate Holden	George Deukmejian	Ruben S. Ayala	Bill Campbell	Robert Presley	John V. Briggs	Dennis Carpenter	Paul Carpenter	John Stull	Bob Wilson	James R. Mills
1979–1980	Ray E. Johnson	Barry Keene	Albert S. Rodda	Jim Nielsen	Milton Marks	John Francis Foran	John A. Nejedly	John W. Holmdahl	Nicholas C. Petris	Marz Garcia	Alfred Alquist	Jerry Smith	John Garamendi	Ken Maddy	Rose Ann Vuich	Walter W. Stiern	Robert P. Nimmo	Omer L. Rains	Lou Cusanovich	Alan Robbins	Newton Russell	Alan Sieroty	David A. Roberti	Alex P. Garcia	H. L. Richardson	Joseph B. Montoya	Robert G. Beverly	Ralph C. Dills	Bill Greene	Diane Watson	Ollie Speraw	Ruben S. Ayala	Bill Campbell	Robert Presley	John V. Briggs	John G. Schmitz	Paul Carpenter	William A. Craven	Bob Wilson	James R. Mills
1981–1982	Ray E. Johnson	Barry Keene	John Doolittle	Jim Nielsen	Milton Marks	John Francis Foran	Daniel E. Boatwright	John W. Holmdahl	Nicholas C. Petris	Marz Garcia	Alfred Alquist	Dan O'Keefe	John Garamendi	Ken Maddy	Rose Ann Vuich	Walter W. Stiern	Henry J. Mello	Omer L. Rains	Edward M. Davis	Alan Robbins	Newton Russell	Alan Sieroty	David A. Roberti	Alex P. Garcia	H. L. Richardson	Joseph B. Montoya	Robert G. Beverly	Ralph C. Dills	Bill Greene	Diane Watson	Ollie Speraw	Ruben S. Ayala	Bill Campbell	Robert Presley	John V. Briggs	John G. Schmitz	Paul Carpenter	William A. Craven	James L. Ellis	James R. Mills
1983–1984	John Doolittle	Barry Keene	Milton Marks	Jim Nielsen	John Garamendi	Leroy F. Greene	Daniel E. Boatwright	John Francis Foran	Nicholas C. Petris	Bill Lockyer	Ray E. Johnson	Dan McCorquodale	Alfred Alquist	Ken Maddy	Rose Ann Vuich	Walter W. Stiern	Henry J. Mello	Gary K. Hart	Edward M. Davis	Alan Robbins	Newton Russell	Herschel Rosenthal	David A. Roberti	Art Torres	H. L. Richardson	Joseph B. Montoya	Bill Greene	Diane Watson	Robert G. Beverly	Ralph C. Dills	Bill Campbell	Ed Royce	Paul Carpenter	Ruben S. Ayala	John F. Seymour	Robert Presley	Ollie Speraw	William A. Craven	James L. Ellis	Wadie P. Deddeh
1985–1986	John Doolittle	Barry Keene	Milton Marks	Jim Nielsen	John Garamendi	Leroy F. Greene	Daniel E. Boatwright	John Francis Foran	Nicholas C. Petris	Bill Lockyer	Becky Morgan	Dan McCorquodale	Alfred Alquist	Ken Maddy	Rose Ann Vuich	Walter W. Stiern	Henry J. Mello	Gary K. Hart	Edward M. Davis	Alan Robbins	Newton Russell	Herschel Rosenthal	David A. Roberti	Art Torres	H. L. Richardson	Joseph B. Montoya	Bill Greene	Diane Watson	Robert G. Beverly	Ralph C. Dills	Bill Campbell	Ed Royce	Paul Carpenter	Ruben S. Ayala	John F. Seymour	Robert Presley	Marian Bergeson	William A. Craven	James L. Ellis	Wadie P. Deddeh
1987–1988	John Doolittle	Barry Keene	Milton Marks	Jim Nielsen	John Garamendi	Leroy F. Greene	Daniel E. Boatwright	Quentin L. Kopp	Nicholas C. Petris	Bill Lockyer	Becky Morgan	Dan McCorquodale	Alfred Alquist	Ken Maddy	Rose Ann Vuich	Don Rogers	Henry J. Mello	Gary K. Hart	Edward M. Davis	Alan Robbins	Newton Russell	Herschel Rosenthal	David A. Roberti	Art Torres	H. L. Richardson	Joseph B. Montoya	Bill Greene	Diane Watson	Robert G. Beverly	Ralph C. Dills	Bill Campbell	Ed Royce	Paul Carpenter	Ruben S. Ayala	John F. Seymour	Robert Presley	Marian Bergeson	William A. Craven	James L. Ellis	Wadie P. Deddeh
1989–1990	John Doolittle	Barry Keene	Milton Marks	Jim Nielsen	John Garamendi	Leroy F. Greene	Daniel E. Boatwright	Quentin L. Kopp	Nicholas C. Petris	Bill Lockyer	Becky Morgan	Dan McCorquodale	Alfred Alquist	Ken Maddy	Rose Ann Vuich	Don Rogers	Henry J. Mello	Gary K. Hart	Edward M. Davis	Alan Robbins	Newton Russell	Herschel Rosenthal	David A. Roberti	Art Torres	Bill Leonard	Joseph B. Montoya	Bill Greene	Diane Watson	Robert G. Beverly	Ralph C. Dills	Bill Campbell	Ed Royce	Cecil Green	Ruben S. Ayala	John F. Seymour	Robert Presley	Marian Bergeson	William A. Craven	Larry Stirling	Wadie P. Deddeh
1991–1992	John Doolittle	Barry Keene	Milton Marks	Mike Thompson	Patrick Johnston	Leroy F. Greene	Daniel E. Boatwright	Quentin L. Kopp	Nicholas C. Petris	Bill Lockyer	Becky Morgan	Dan McCorquodale	Alfred Alquist	Ken Maddy	Rose Ann Vuich	Don Rogers	Henry J. Mello	Gary K. Hart	Edward M. Davis	Alan Robbins	Newton Russell	Herschel Rosenthal	David A. Roberti	Art Torres	Bill Leonard	Charles Calderon	Bill Greene	Diane Watson	Robert G. Beverly	Ralph C. Dills	Frank C. Hill	Ed Royce	Cecil Green	Ruben S. Ayala	John F. Seymour	Robert Presley	Marian Bergeson	William A. Craven	Lucy Killea	Wadie P. Deddeh
1993–1994	Tim Leslie	Mike Thompson	Milton Marks	Maurice Johannessen	Patrick Johnston	Leroy F. Greene	Daniel E. Boatwright	Quentin L. Kopp	Nicholas C. Petris	Bill Lockyer	Tom Campbell	Dick Monteith	Alfred Alquist	Ken Maddy	Henry J. Mello	Phil Wyman	Don Rogers	Jack O'Connell	Cathie Wright	Alan Robbins	Newton Russell	Herschel Rosenthal	Tom Hayden	Hilda Solis	Terry Hughes	Diane Watson	Robert G. Beverly	Ralph C. Dills	Frank C. Hill	Charles Calderon	Bill Leonard	Ruben S. Ayala	John Lewis	Rob Hurtt	Marian Bergeson	Ray Haynes	David G. Kelley	William A. Craven	Lucy Killea	Steve Peace
1995–1996	Tim Leslie	Mike Thompson	Milton Marks	Maurice Johannessen	Patrick Johnston	Leroy F. Greene	Daniel E. Boatwright	Quentin L. Kopp	Nicholas C. Petris	Bill Lockyer	Byron Sher	Dick Monteith	Alfred Alquist	Ken Maddy	Henry J. Mello	Jim Costa	Don Rogers	Jack O'Connell	Cathie Wright	Herschel Rosenthal	Newton Russell	Richard Polanco	Tom Hayden	Hilda Solis	Terry Hughes	Diane Watson	Robert G. Beverly	Ralph C. Dills	Richard Mountjoy	Charles Calderon	Bill Leonard	Ruben S. Ayala	John Lewis	Rob Hurtt	Ross Johnson	Ray Haynes	David G. Kelley	William A. Craven	Lucy Killea	Steve Peace
1997–1998	Tim Leslie	Mike Thompson	John L. Burton	Maurice Johannessen	Patrick Johnston	Leroy F. Greene	Richard K. Rainey	Quentin L. Kopp	Barbara Lee	Bill Lockyer	Byron Sher	Dick Monteith	John Vasconcellos	Ken Maddy	Bruce McPherson	Jim Costa	William Joseph "Pete" Knight	Jack O'Connell	Cathie Wright	Herschel Rosenthal	Adam Schiff	Richard Polanco	Tom Hayden	Hilda Solis	Terry Hughes	Diane Watson	Betty Karnette	Ralph C. Dills	Richard Mountjoy	Charles Calderon	Jim Brulte	Ruben S. Ayala	John Lewis	Rob Hurtt	Ross Johnson	Ray Haynes	David G. Kelley	William A. Craven	Dede Alpert	Steve Peace
1999–2000	Tim Leslie	Wesley Chesbro	John L. Burton	Maurice Johannessen	Patrick Johnston	Deborah Ortiz	Richard K. Rainey	Jackie Speier	Don Perata	Liz Figueroa	Byron Sher	Dick Monteith	John Vasconcellos	Charles Poochigian	Bruce McPherson	Jim Costa	William Joseph "Pete" Knight	Jack O'Connell	Cathie Wright	Richard Alarcon	Adam Schiff	Richard Polanco	Tom Hayden	Hilda Solis	Terry Hughes	Kevin Murray	Betty Karnette	Debra Bowen	Richard Mountjoy	Martha Escutia	Jim Brulte	Joe Baca	John Lewis	Joe Dunn	Ross Johnson	Ray Haynes	David G. Kelley	Bill Morrow	Dede Alpert	Steve Peace
2001–2002	Thomas "Rico" Oller	Wesley Chesbro	John L. Burton	Maurice Johannessen	Michael Machado	Deborah Ortiz	Tom Torlakson	Jackie Speier	Don Perata	Liz Figueroa	Byron Sher	Dick Monteith	John Vasconcellos	Charles Poochigian	Bruce McPherson	Jim Costa	William Joseph "Pete" Knight	Jack O'Connell	Tom McClintock	Richard Alarcon	Jack Scott	Richard Polanco	Sheila Kuehl	Gloria Romero	Edward Vincent	Kevin Murray	Betty Karnette	Debra Bowen	Bob Margett	Martha Escutia	Jim Brulte	Nell Soto	Dick Ackerman	Joe Dunn	Ross Johnson	Ray Haynes	Jim Battin	Bill Morrow	Dede Alpert	Steve Peace
2003–2004	Thomas "Rico" Oller	Wesley Chesbro	John L. Burton	Sam Aanestad	Michael Machado	Deborah Ortiz	Tom Torlakson	Jackie Speier	Don Perata	Liz Figueroa	Byron Sher	Jeff Denham	John Vasconcellos	Charles Poochigian	Bruce McPherson	Dean Florez	William Joseph "Pete" Knight	Roy Ashburn	Tom McClintock	Richard Alarcon	Jack Scott	Gil Cedillo	Sheila Kuehl	Gloria Romero	Edward Vincent	Kevin Murray	Betty Karnette	Debra Bowen	Bob Margett	Martha Escutia	Jim Brulte	Nell Soto	Dick Ackerman	Joe Dunn	Ross Johnson	Dennis Hollingsworth	Jim Battin	Bill Morrow	Dede Alpert	Denise Moreno Ducheny
2005–2006	Dave Cox	Wesley Chesbro	Carole Migden	Sam Aanestad	Michael Machado	Deborah Ortiz	Tom Torlakson	Jackie Speier	Don Perata	Liz Figueroa	Joe Simitian	Jeff Denham	Elaine Alquist	Charles Poochigian	Abel Maldonado	Dean Florez	George Runner	Roy Ashburn	Tom McClintock	Richard Alarcon	Jack Scott	Gil Cedillo	Sheila Kuehl	Gloria Romero	Edward Vincent	Kevin Murray	Alan Lowenthal	Debra Bowen	Bob Margett	Martha Escutia	Robert Dutton	Nell Soto	Dick Ackerman	Joe Dunn	John Campbell	Dennis Hollingsworth	Jim Battin	Bill Morrow	Christine Kehoe	Denise Moreno Ducheny
2007–2008	Dave Cox	Pat Wiggins	Carole Migden	Sam Aanestad	Michael Machado	Darrell Steinberg	Tom Torlakson	Leland Yee	Don Perata	Ellen Corbett	Joe Simitian	Jeff Denham	Elaine Alquist	Dave Cogdill	Abel Maldonado	Dean Florez	George Runner	Roy Ashburn	Tom McClintock	Alex Padilla	Jack Scott	Gil Cedillo	Sheila Kuehl	Gloria Romero	Edward Vincent	Mark Ridley-Thomas	Alan Lowenthal	Jenny Oropeza	Bob Margett	Ronald S. Calderon	Robert Dutton	Gloria Negrete McLeod	Dick Ackerman	Lou Correa	Tom Harman	Dennis Hollingsworth	Jim Battin	Mark Wyland	Christine Kehoe	Denise Moreno Ducheny
2009–2010	Dave Cox	Pat Wiggins	Mark Leno	Sam Aanestad	Lois Wolk	Darrell Steinberg	Mark DeSaulnier	Leland Yee	Loni Hancock	Ellen Corbett	Joe Simitian	Jeff Denham	Elaine Alquist	Dave Cogdill	Abel Maldonado	Dean Florez	George Runner	Roy Ashburn	Tony Strickland	Alex Padilla	Carol Liu	Gil Cedillo	Fran Pavley	Gloria Romero	Rod Wright	Curren Price	Alan Lowenthal	Jenny Oropeza	Bob Huff	Ronald S. Calderon	Robert Dutton	Gloria Negrete McLeod	Mimi Walters	Lou Correa	Tom Harman	Dennis Hollingsworth	John J. Benoit	Mark Wyland	Christine Kehoe	Denise Moreno Ducheny
2011–2012	Ted Gaines	Noreen Evans	Mark Leno	Doug LaMalfa	Lois Wolk	Darrell Steinberg	Mark DeSaulnier	Leland Yee	Loni Hancock	Ellen Corbett	Joe Simitian	Anthony Cannella	Elaine Alquist	Tom Berryhill	Sam Blakeslee	Michael Rubio	Sharon Runner	Jean Fuller	Tony Strickland	Alex Padilla	Carol Liu	Kevin de León	Fran Pavley	Ed Hernandez	Rod Wright	Curren Price	Alan Lowenthal	Ted Lieu	Bob Huff	Ronald S. Calderon	Robert Dutton	Gloria Negrete McLeod	Mimi Walters	Lou Correa	Tom Harman	Joel Anderson	Bill Emmerson	Mark Wyland	Christine Kehoe	Juan Vargas
2013–2014	Ted Gaines	Noreen Evans	Lois Wolk	Jim Nielsen	Cathleen Galgiani	Darrell Steinberg	Mark DeSaulnier	Leland Yee	Loni Hancock	Ellen Corbett	Mark Leno	Anthony Cannella	Jerry Hill	Tom Berryhill	Jim Beall	Michael Rubio	Bill Monning	Jean Fuller	Hannah-Beth Jackson	Alex Padilla	Steve Knight	Kevin de León	Bill Emmerson	Ed Hernandez	Carol Liu	Curren Price	Fran Pavley	Ted Lieu	Bob Huff	Ronald S. Calderon	Richard Roth	Norma Torres	Ricardo Lara	Lou Correa	Roderick Wright	Joel Anderson	Mimi Walters	Mark Wyland	Marty Block	Ben Hueso
2015–2016	Ted Gaines	Mike McGuire	Lois Wolk	Jim Nielsen	Cathleen Galgiani	Richard Pan	Steve Glazer	Tom Berryhill	Loni Hancock	Bob Wieckowski	Mark Leno	Anthony Cannella	Jerry Hill	Andy Vidak	Jim Beall	Jean Fuller	Bill Monning	Robert Hertzberg	Hannah-Beth Jackson	Connie Leyva	Sharon Runner	Ed Hernandez	Mike Morrell	Kevin de León	Carol Liu	Ben Allen	Fran Pavley	Jeff Stone	Bob Huff	Holly Mitchell	Richard Roth	Tony Mendoza	Ricardo Lara	Janet Nguyen	Isadore Hall III	Patricia Bates	John Moorlach	Joel Anderson	Marty Block	Ben Hueso
2017–2018	Ted Gaines	Mike McGuire	Bill Dodd	Jim Nielsen	Cathleen Galgiani	Richard Pan	Steve Glazer	Tom Berryhill	Nancy Skinner	Bob Wieckowski	Scott Wiener	Anthony Cannella	Jerry Hill	Andy Vidak	Jim Beall	Jean Fuller	Bill Monning	Robert Hertzberg	Hannah-Beth Jackson	Connie Leyva	Scott Wilk	Ed Hernandez	Mike Morrell	Kevin de León	Anthony Portantino	Ben Allen	Henry Stern	Jeff Stone	Josh Newman	Holly Mitchell	Richard Roth	Vanessa Delgado	Ricardo Lara	Janet Nguyen	Steven Bradford	Patricia Bates	John Moorlach	Joel Anderson	Toni Atkins	Ben Hueso
2019–2020	Brian Dahle	Mike McGuire	Bill Dodd	Jim Nielsen	Cathleen Galgiani	Richard Pan	Steve Glazer	Andreas Borgeas	Nancy Skinner	Bob Wieckowski	Scott Wiener	Anna Caballero	Jerry Hill	Melissa Hurtado	Jim Beall	Shannon Grove	Bill Monning	Robert Hertzberg	Hannah-Beth Jackson	Connie Leyva	Scott Wilk	Susan Rubio	Mike Morrell	Maria Elena Durazo	Anthony Portantino	Ben Allen	Henry Stern	Jeff Stone	Ling Ling Chang	Holly Mitchell	Richard Roth	Bob Archuleta	Lena Gonzalez	Tom Umberg	Steven Bradford	Patricia Bates	John Moorlach	Brian Jones	Toni Atkins	Ben Hueso
Senate Session	1st	2nd	3rd	4th	5th	6th	7th	8th	9th	10th	11th	12th	13th	14th	15th	16th	17th	18th	19th	20th	21st	22nd	23rd	24th	25th	26th	27th	28th	29th	30th	31st	32nd	33rd	34th	35th	36th	37th	38th	39th	40th
Senate Session	District																																							

== California State Assembly ==
Assembly Session	District																																																																															
Assembly Session	1st	2nd	3rd	4th	5th	6th	7th	8th	9th	10th	11th	12th	13th	14th	15th	16th	17th	18th	19th	20th	21st	22nd	23rd	24th	25th	26th	27th	28th	29th	30th	31st	32nd	33rd	34th	35th	36th	37th	38th	39th	40th	41st	42nd	43rd	44th	45th	46th	47th	48th	49th	50th	51st	52nd	53rd	54th	55th	56th	57th	58th	59th	60th	61st	62nd	63rd	64th	65th	66th	67th	68th	69th	70th	71st	72nd	73rd	74th	75th	76th	77th	78th	79th	80th
1968	Pauline Davis	Frank P. Belotti	Leroy F. Greene	Ray E. Johnson	John F. Dunlap	Gene Chappie	William T. Bagley	Walter W. Powers	Edwin L. Z'berg	James W. Dent	John T. Knox	Robert T. Monagan	Carlos Bee	Robert W. Crown	March Fong Eu	Don Mulford	John J. Miller	Willie Brown	Charles W. Meyers	John L. Burton	Gordon W. Duffy	George W. Milias	John Francis Foran	John Vasconcellos	Earle P. Crandall	Carl A. Britschgi	Leo Ryan	Kent H. Stacey	William M. Ketchum	John Veneman	Frank Murphy, Jr.	George Zenovich	Ernest Mobley	Alan Pattee	John Briggs	Winfield Shoemaker	Ken MacDonald	Carley V. Porter	James A. Hayes	Edward E. Elliott	David Negri	Bob Moretti	Carlos Moorhead	Mike Cullen	Walter J. Karabian	Robert G. Beverly	Frank D. Lanterman	David A. Roberti	Peter F. Schabarum	Bill Campbell	Jack R. Fenton	Floyd L. Wakefield	Bill Greene	Bud Collier	Leon D. Ralph	Charles Warren	Charles J. Conrad	Harvey Johnson	Alan Sieroty	Paul V. Priolo	Lester A. McMillan	Newton R. Russell	Yvonne Brathwaite Burke	Patrick McGee	Jesse M. Unruh	Joe A. Gonsalves	Larry Townsend	Vincent Thomas	Kenneth Cory	Robert H. Burke	Robert Badham	John Quimby	L. Stewart Hinckley	W. Craig Biddle	Victor Veysey	Pete Wilson	Wadie P. Deddeh	E. Richard Barnes	Frederick James Bear	John Stull
1969	Pauline Davis	Frank P. Belotti	Leroy F. Greene	Ray E. Johnson	John F. Dunlap	Gene Chappie	William T. Bagley	Walter W. Powers	Edwin L. Z'berg	James W. Dent	John T. Knox	Robert T. Monagan	Carlos Bee	Robert W. Crown	March Fong Eu	Don Mulford	John J. Miller	Willie Brown	Leo T. McCarthy	John L. Burton	Gordon W. Duffy	George W. Milias	John Francis Foran	John Vasconcellos	Earle P. Crandall	Carl A. Britschgi	Leo Ryan	Kent H. Stacey	William M. Ketchum	John Veneman	Frank Murphy, Jr.	George Zenovich	Ernest Mobley	Alan Pattee	John Briggs	W. Don MacGillivray	Ken MacDonald	Carley V. Porter	James A. Hayes	Alex P. Garcia	Henry Arklin	Bob Moretti	Carlos Moorhead	Mike Cullen	Walter J. Karabian	Robert G. Beverly	Frank D. Lanterman	David A. Roberti	Peter F. Schabarum	Bill Campbell	Jack R. Fenton	Floyd L. Wakefield	Bill Greene	Bud Collier	Leon D. Ralph	Charles Warren	Charles J. Conrad	Harvey Johnson	Alan Sieroty	Paul V. Priolo	Henry Waxman	Newton R. Russell	Yvonne Brathwaite Burke	Patrick McGee	Jesse M. Unruh	Joe A. Gonsalves	Larry Townsend	Vincent Thomas	Kenneth Cory	Robert H. Burke	Robert Badham	John Quimby	Jerry Lewis	W. Craig Biddle	Victor Veysey	Pete Wilson	Wadie P. Deddeh	E. Richard Barnes	Tom Hom	John Stull
1970	Pauline Davis	Frank P. Belotti	Leroy F. Greene	Ray E. Johnson	John F. Dunlap	Gene Chappie	William T. Bagley	Walter W. Powers	Edwin L. Z'berg	James W. Dent	John T. Knox	Robert T. Monagan	Carlos Bee	Robert W. Crown	March Fong Eu	Don Mulford	John J. Miller	Willie Brown	Leo T. McCarthy	John L. Burton	Gordon W. Duffy	George W. Milias	John Francis Foran	John Vasconcellos	Earle P. Crandall	Carl A. Britschgi	Leo Ryan	Kent H. Stacey	William M. Ketchum	Clare Berryhill	Frank Murphy, Jr.	George Zenovich	Ernest Mobley	Bob Wood	John Briggs	W. Don MacGillivray	Ken MacDonald	Carley V. Porter	James A. Hayes	Alex P. Garcia	Henry Arklin	Bob Moretti	Carlos Moorhead	Mike Cullen	Walter J. Karabian	Robert G. Beverly	Frank D. Lanterman	David A. Roberti	Peter F. Schabarum	Bill Campbell	Jack R. Fenton	Floyd L. Wakefield	Bill Greene	Bud Collier	Leon D. Ralph	Charles Warren	Charles J. Conrad	Harvey Johnson	Alan Sieroty	Paul V. Priolo	Henry Waxman	Newton R. Russell	Yvonne Brathwaite Burke	Patrick McGee	Jesse M. Unruh	Joe A. Gonsalves	Larry Townsend	Vincent Thomas	Kenneth Cory	Robert H. Burke	Robert Badham	John Quimby	Jerry Lewis	W. Craig Biddle	Victor Veysey	Pete Wilson	Wadie P. Deddeh	E. Richard Barnes	Tom Hom	John Stull
1971	Pauline Davis	Frank P. Belotti	Leroy F. Greene	Ray E. Johnson	John F. Dunlap	Gene Chappie	William T. Bagley	Walter W. Powers	Edwin L. Z'berg	James W. Dent	John T. Knox	Robert T. Monagan	Carlos Bee	Robert W. Crown	March Fong Eu	Kenneth A. Meade	John J. Miller	Willie Brown	Leo T. McCarthy	John L. Burton	Gordon W. Duffy	Richard D. Hayden	John Francis Foran	John Vasconcellos	Alister McAlister	Dixon Arnett	Leo Ryan	Kent H. Stacey	William M. Ketchum	Ernest LaCoste	Frank Murphy, Jr.	Ken Maddy	Ernest Mobley	Bob Wood	John Briggs	W. Don MacGillivray	Ken MacDonald	Carley V. Porter	James A. Hayes	Alex P. Garcia	Jim Keysor	Bob Moretti	Carlos Moorhead	Mike Cullen	Walter J. Karabian	Robert G. Beverly	Frank D. Lanterman	David A. Roberti	Peter F. Schabarum	Bill Campbell	Jack R. Fenton	Floyd L. Wakefield	Bill Greene	Bud Collier	Leon D. Ralph	Charles Warren	Charles J. Conrad	Harvey Johnson	Alan Sieroty	Paul V. Priolo	Henry Waxman	Newton R. Russell	Yvonne Brathwaite Burke	Bob Cline	David C. Pierson	Joe A. Gonsalves	Larry Townsend	Vincent Thomas	Kenneth Cory	Robert H. Burke	Robert Badham	John Quimby	Jerry Lewis	W. Craig Biddle	Raymond T. "Ray" Seely	Pete Wilson	Wadie P. Deddeh	E. Richard Barnes	Peter R. "Pete" Chacon	John Stull
1972	Pauline Davis	Frank P. Belotti	Leroy F. Greene	Ray E. Johnson	John F. Dunlap	Gene Chappie	William T. Bagley	Walter W. Powers	Edwin L. Z'berg	James W. Dent	John T. Knox	Robert T. Monagan	Carlos Bee	Robert W. Crown	March Fong Eu	Kenneth A. Meade	John J. Miller	Willie Brown	Leo T. McCarthy	John L. Burton	Gordon W. Duffy	Richard D. Hayden	John Francis Foran	John Vasconcellos	Alister McAlister	Dixon Arnett	Leo Ryan	Kent H. Stacey	William M. Ketchum	Ernest LaCoste	Frank Murphy, Jr.	Ken Maddy	Ernest Mobley	Bob Wood	John Briggs	W. Don MacGillivray	Ken MacDonald	Carley V. Porter	James A. Hayes	Alex P. Garcia	Jim Keysor	Bob Moretti	Carlos Moorhead	Mike Cullen	Walter J. Karabian	Robert G. Beverly	Frank D. Lanterman	Bill Brophy	Bill Lancaster	Bill Campbell	Jack R. Fenton	Floyd L. Wakefield	Bill Greene	Bud Collier	Leon D. Ralph	Charles Warren	Charles J. Conrad	Harvey Johnson	Alan Sieroty	Paul V. Priolo	Henry Waxman	Newton R. Russell	Yvonne Brathwaite Burke	Bob Cline	David C. Pierson	Joe A. Gonsalves	Larry Townsend	Vincent Thomas	Kenneth Cory	Robert H. Burke	Robert Badham	John Quimby	Jerry Lewis	W. Craig Biddle	Raymond T. "Ray" Seely	Bob Wilson	Wadie P. Deddeh	E. Richard Barnes	Peter R. "Pete" Chacon	John Stull
1973–1974	Pauline Davis	Barry Keene	Leroy F. Greene	Ray E. Johnson	John F. Dunlap	Gene Chappie	William T. Bagley	Walter W. Powers	Edwin L. Z'berg	Daniel E. Boatwright	John T. Knox	Robert T. Monagan	Carlos Bee	Robert W. Crown	March Fong Eu	Kenneth A. Meade	John J. Miller	Willie Brown	Leo T. McCarthy	John L. Burton	Gordon W. Duffy	Richard D. Hayden	John Francis Foran	John Vasconcellos	Alister McAlister	Dixon Arnett	Lou Papan	Raymond Gonzales	Robert P. Nimmo	John E. Thurman	Frank Murphy, Jr.	Ken Maddy	Ernest Mobley	Bob Wood	John Briggs	W. Don MacGillivray	Ken MacDonald	Carley V. Porter	Bill Bond	Alex P. Garcia	Jim Keysor	Bob Moretti	Michael D. Antonovich	Mike Cullen	Walter J. Karabian	Robert G. Beverly	Frank D. Lanterman	Richard Alatorre	Bill Lancaster	Bill Campbell	Jack R. Fenton	Floyd L. Wakefield	Bill Greene	Bud Collier	Leon D. Ralph	Charles Warren	Howard Berman	Harvey Johnson	Alan Sieroty	Julian C. Dixon	Henry Waxman	Newton R. Russell	Frank Holoman	Bob Cline	Walter M. Ingalls	Joe A. Gonsalves	Larry Townsend	Vincent Thomas	Kenneth Cory	Robert H. Burke	Robert Badham	John Quimby	Jerry Lewis	Lawrence Kapiloff	Raymond T. "Ray" Seely	Bob Wilson	Wadie P. Deddeh		Peter R. "Pete" Chacon	John Stull
1975–1976	Pauline Davis	Barry Keene	Gene Chappie	Edwin L. Z'berg	Eugene Gualco	Leroy F. Greene	John Garamendi	Alfred Siegler	Michael Wornum	Daniel E. Boatwright	John T. Knox	Kenneth Meade	John J. Miller	Bill Lockyer	Carlos Bee	John Francis Foran	Willie Brown	Leo T. McCarthy	Lou Papan	Dixon Arnett	Victor Calvo	Richard D. Hayden	John Vasconcellos	Leona H. Egeland	Alister McAlister	Carmen Perino	John E. Thurman	Frank Murphy, Jr.	Robert P. Nimmo	Ken Maddy	Ernest Mobley	Gordon W. Duffy	Bill Thomas	Larry Chimbole	Gary K. Hart	Ken MacDonald	Robert C. Cline	Paul Priolo	Jim Keysor	Tom Bane	Michael D. Antonovich	Frank Lanterman	Howard Berman	Alan Sieroty	Herschel Rosenthal	Charles Warren	Bill Greene	Leon Ralph	Julian C. Dixon	Curtis R. Tucker	Robert G. Beverly	Vincent Thomas	Paul T. Bannai	Frank Vicencia	Richard Alatorre	Art Torres	Mike Cullen	Fred Chel	Jack R. Fenton	Joseph B. Montoya	Bud Collier	Bill Lancaster	Bob McLennan	Bill Campbell	Bill McVittie	Terry Goggin	Jerry Lewis	Walter M. Ingalls	John Briggs	Bruce Nestande	Paul Carpenter	Richard Robinson	Robert H. Burke	Robert Badham	Tom Suitt	William A. Craven	Bob Wilson	Lawrence Kapiloff	Peter R. "Pete" Chacon	Wadie P. Deddeh
1977–1978	Stan Statham	Barry Keene	Gene Chappie	Victor H. Fazio	Eugene Gualco	Leroy F. Greene	Norman S. Waters	Michael Gage	Michael Wornum	Daniel E. Boatwright	John T. Knox	Tom Bates	John J. Miller	Bill Lockyer	Floyd Mori	Art Agnos	Willie Brown	Leo T. McCarthy	Lou Papan	Dixon Arnett	Victor Calvo	Richard D. Hayden	John Vasconcellos	Leona H. Egeland	Alister McAlister	Carmen Perino	John E. Thurman	Henry J. Mello	Carol Hallett	Ken Maddy	Richard H. Lehman	Gordon W. Duffy	Bill Thomas	Larry Chimbole	Gary K. Hart	Charles R. Imbrecht	Robert C. Cline	Paul Priolo	Jim Keysor	Tom Bane	Michael D. Antonovich	Frank Lanterman	Howard Berman	Alan Sieroty	Herschel Rosenthal	Charles Warren	Teresa P. "Terry" Hughes	Maxine Waters	Julian C. Dixon	Curtis R. Tucker	Marilyn Ryan	Vincent Thomas	Paul T. Bannai	Frank Vicencia	Richard Alatorre	Art Torres	Mike Cullen	Fred Chel	Jack R. Fenton	Joseph B. Montoya	Bud Collier	Bill Lancaster	Bruce E. Young	M. David "Dave" Stirling	Bill McVittie	Terry Goggin	Jerry Lewis	Walter M. Ingalls	William E. Dannemeyer	Bruce Nestande	Chester B. "Chet" Wray	Richard Robinson	Dennis Mangers	Ronald Cordova	Tom Suitt	William A. Craven	James L. Ellis	Lawrence Kapiloff	Peter R. "Pete" Chacon	Wadie P. Deddeh
1979–1980	Stan Statham	Douglas Bosco	Gene Chappie	Thomas M. Hannigan	Jean M. Moorhead	Leroy F. Greene	Norman S. Waters	Michael Gage	Bill Filante	Daniel E. Boatwright	John T. Knox	Tom Bates	Elihu M. Harris	Bill Lockyer	Floyd Mori	Art Agnos	Willie Brown	Leo T. McCarthy	Lou Papan	Bob Naylor	Victor Calvo	Richard D. Hayden	John Vasconcellos	Leona H. Egeland	Alister McAlister	Carmen Perino	John E. Thurman	Henry J. Mello	Carol Hallett	Jim Costa	Richard H. Lehman	Gordon W. Duffy	Don Rogers	Phil Wyman	Gary K. Hart	Charles R. Imbrecht	Robert C. Cline	Paul Priolo	J. Robert Hayes	Tom Bane	Pat Nolan	Bill Ivers	Howard Berman	Mel Levine	Herschel Rosenthal	Mike Roos	Teresa P. "Terry" Hughes	Maxine Waters	Gwen Moore	Curtis R. Tucker	Marilyn Ryan	Gerald N. Felando	Paul T. Bannai	Frank Vicencia	Richard Alatorre	Art Torres	Dave Elder	Dennis L. Brown	Jack R. Fenton	Sally Tanner	Dick Mountjoy	Bill Lancaster	Bruce E. Young	M. David "Dave" Stirling	Bill McVittie	Terry Goggin	Bill Leonard	Walter M. Ingalls	Ross Johnson	Bruce Nestande	Chester B. "Chet" Wray	Richard Robinson	Dennis Mangers	Marian Bergeson	David G. Kelley	Robert C. Frazee	James L. Ellis	Lawrence Kapiloff	Peter R. "Pete" Chacon	Wadie P. Deddeh
1981–1982	Stan Statham	Douglas Bosco	Wally Herger	Thomas M. Hannigan	Jean M. Moorhead	Leroy F. Greene	Norman S. Waters	Don A. Sebastiani	Bill Filante	Bill Baker	Bob Campbell	Tom Bates	Elihu M. Harris	Bill Lockyer	Gib Marguth	Art Agnos	Willie Brown	Leo T. McCarthy	Lou Papan	Bob Naylor	Byron D. Sher	Ernest L. "Ernie" Konnyu	John Vasconcellos	Dom Cortese	Alister McAlister	Patrick Johnston	John E. Thurman	Sam Farr	Carol Hallett	Jim Costa	Richard H. Lehman	Gordon W. Duffy	Don Rogers	Phil Wyman	Gary K. Hart	Charles R. Imbrecht	Cathie Wright	Marian W. LaFollette	Richard Katz	Tom Bane	Pat Nolan	Bill Ivers	Howard Berman	Mel Levine	Herschel Rosenthal	Mike Roos	Teresa P. "Terry" Hughes	Maxine Waters	Gwen Moore	Curtis R. Tucker	Marilyn Ryan	Gerald N. Felando	Richard Floyd	Frank Vicencia	Richard Alatorre	Art Torres	Dave Elder	Dennis L. Brown	Marty Martinez	Sally Tanner	Dick Mountjoy	Bill Lancaster	Bruce E. Young	M. David "Dave" Stirling	Jim Cramer	Terry Goggin	Bill Leonard	Walter M. Ingalls	Ross Johnson	John Lewis	Chester B. "Chet" Wray	Richard Robinson	Nolan Frizzelle	Marian Bergeson	David G. Kelley	Robert C. Frazee	Larry Stirling	Lawrence Kapiloff	Peter R. "Pete" Chacon	Wadie P. Deddeh
1983–1984	Stan Statham	Dan Hauser	Wally Herger	Thomas M. Hannigan	Jean M. Moorhead	Lloyd G. Connelly	Norman S. Waters	Don A. Sebastiani	Bill Filante	Phillip Isenberg	Bob Campbell	Tom Bates	Elihu M. Harris	Johan Klehs	Bill Baker	Art Agnos	Willie Brown	Alister McAlister	Lou Papan	Bob Naylor	Byron D. Sher	Ernest L. "Ernie" Konnyu	John Vasconcellos	Dom Cortese	Rusty Areias	Patrick Johnston	Gary A. Condit	Sam Farr	Eric Seastrand	Jim Costa	Bruce Bronzan	Bill Jones	Don Rogers	Phil Wyman	Jack O'Connell	Tom McClintock	Cathie Wright	Marian W. LaFollette	Richard Katz	Tom Bane	Pat Nolan	Dick Mountjoy	Gray Davis	Tom Hayden	Burt M. Margolin	Mike Roos	Teresa P. "Terry" Hughes	Maxine Waters	Gwen Moore	Curtis R. Tucker	Gerald N. Felando	Frank C. Hill	Richard Floyd	Frank Vicencia	Richard Alatorre	Gloria Molina	Dave Elder	Dennis L. Brown	Charles Calderon	Sally Tanner	Bill Leonard	Bill Lancaster	Bruce E. Young	Ross Johnson	Charles W. Bader	Terry Goggin	John Lewis	Steve Clute	Nolan Frizzelle	Marian Bergeson	Doris Allen	Richard Robinson	David G. Kelley	Robert C. Frazee	Joyce Mojonnier	Bill Bradley	Larry Stirling	Lucy Killea	Peter R. "Pete" Chacon	Stephen Peace
1985–1986	Stan Statham	Dan Hauser	Wally Herger	Thomas M. Hannigan	Jean M. Moorhead	Lloyd G. Connelly	Norman S. Waters	Don A. Sebastiani	Bill Filante	Phillip Isenberg	Bob Campbell	Tom Bates	Elihu M. Harris	Johan Klehs	Bill Baker	Art Agnos	Willie Brown	Alister McAlister	Lou Papan	Bob Naylor	Byron D. Sher	Ernest L. "Ernie" Konnyu	John Vasconcellos	Dom Cortese	Rusty Areias	Patrick Johnston	Gary A. Condit	Sam Farr	Eric Seastrand	Jim Costa	Bruce Bronzan	Bill Jones	Don Rogers	Phil Wyman	Jack O'Connell	Tom McClintock	Cathie Wright	Marian W. LaFollette	Richard Katz	Tom Bane	Pat Nolan	Dick Mountjoy	Gray Davis	Tom Hayden	Burt M. Margolin	Mike Roos	Teresa P. "Terry" Hughes	Maxine Waters	Gwen Moore	Curtis R. Tucker	Gerald N. Felando	Frank C. Hill	Richard Floyd	Frank Vicencia	Richard Alatorre	Gloria Molina	Dave Elder	Dennis L. Brown	Charles Calderon	Sally Tanner	Bill Leonard	Bill Lancaster	Wayne R. Grisham	Ross Johnson	Charles W. Bader	Gerald R. "Jerry" Eaves	John Lewis	Steve Clute	Nolan Frizzelle	Gil Ferguson	Doris Allen	Richard Robinson	David G. Kelley	Robert C. Frazee	Joyce Mojonnier	Bill Bradley	Larry Stirling	Lucy Killea	Peter R. "Pete" Chacon	Stephen Peace
1987–1988	Stan Statham	Dan Hauser	Chris Chandler	Thomas M. Hannigan	Tim Leslie	Lloyd G. Connelly	Norman S. Waters	Bev Hansen	Bill Filante	Phillip Isenberg	Bob Campbell	Tom Bates	Elihu M. Harris	Johan Klehs	Bill Baker	Art Agnos	Willie Brown	Delaine Eastin	Jackie Speier	Bill Duplissea	Byron D. Sher	Chuck Quackenbush	John Vasconcellos	Dom Cortese	Rusty Areias	Patrick Johnston	Gary A. Condit	Sam Farr	Eric Seastrand	Jim Costa	Bruce Bronzan	Bill Jones	Trice J. Harvey	Phil Wyman	Jack O'Connell	Tom McClintock	Cathie Wright	Marian W. LaFollette	Richard Katz	Tom Bane	Pat Nolan	Dick Mountjoy	Terry B. Friedman	Tom Hayden	Burt M. Margolin	Mike Roos	Teresa P. "Terry" Hughes	Maxine Waters	Gwen Moore	Curtis R. Tucker	Gerald N. Felando	Frank C. Hill	Richard Floyd	Paul E. Zeltner	Richard Polanco	Gloria Molina	Dave Elder	Dennis L. Brown	Charles Calderon	Sally Tanner	Bill Leonard	Bill Lancaster	Wayne R. Grisham	Ross Johnson	Charles W. Bader	Gerald R. "Jerry" Eaves	John Lewis	Steve Clute	Nolan Frizzelle	Gil Ferguson	Doris Allen	Dick Longshore	David G. Kelley	Robert C. Frazee	Joyce Mojonnier	Bill Bradley	Larry Stirling	Lucy Killea	Peter R. "Pete" Chacon	Stephen Peace
1989–1990	Stan Statham	Dan Hauser	Chris Chandler	Thomas M. Hannigan	Tim Leslie	Lloyd G. Connelly	Norman S. Waters	Bev Hansen	Bill Filante	Phillip Isenberg	Bob Campbell	Tom Bates	Elihu M. Harris	Johan Klehs	Bill Baker	John L. Burton	Willie Brown	Delaine Eastin	Jackie Speier	Ted Lempert	Byron D. Sher	Chuck Quackenbush	John Vasconcellos	Dom Cortese	Rusty Areias	Patrick Johnston	Gary A. Condit	Sam Farr	Eric Seastrand	Jim Costa	Bruce Bronzan	Bill Jones	Trice J. Harvey	Phil Wyman	Jack O'Connell	Tom McClintock	Cathie Wright	Marian W. LaFollette	Richard Katz	Tom Bane	Pat Nolan	Dick Mountjoy	Terry B. Friedman	Tom Hayden	Burt M. Margolin	Mike Roos	Teresa P. "Terry" Hughes	Maxine Waters	Gwen Moore	Curtis R. Tucker	Gerald N. Felando	Frank C. Hill	Richard Floyd	Willard H. Murray, Jr.	Richard Polanco	Lucille Roybal-Allard	Dave Elder	Dennis L. Brown	Charles Calderon	Sally Tanner	Paul A. Woodruff	Bill Lancaster	Bob Epple	Ross Johnson	Charles W. Bader	Gerald R. "Jerry" Eaves	John Lewis	Steve Clute	Nolan Frizzelle	Gil Ferguson	Doris Allen	Curt Pringle	David G. Kelley	Robert C. Frazee	Joyce Mojonnier	Bill Bradley	Carol Bentley	Lucy Killea	Peter R. "Pete" Chacon	Stephen Peace
1991–1992	Stan Statham	Dan Hauser	Chris Chandler	Thomas M. Hannigan	B. T. Collins	Lloyd G. Connelly	David Knowles	Bev Hansen	Bill Filante	Phillip Isenberg	Bob Campbell	Tom Bates	Barbara Lee	Johan Klehs	Bill Baker	John L. Burton	Willie Brown	Delaine Eastin	Jackie Speier	Ted Lempert	Byron D. Sher	Chuck Quackenbush	John Vasconcellos	Dom Cortese	Rusty Areias	Dean Andal	Sal Cannella	Sam Farr	Andrea Seastrand	Jim Costa	Bruce Bronzan	Bill Jones	Trice J. Harvey	Phil Wyman	Jack O'Connell	Tom McClintock	Cathie Wright	Paula Boland	Richard Katz	Tom Bane	Pat Nolan	Dick Mountjoy	Terry B. Friedman	Tom Hayden	Burt M. Margolin	Mike Roos	Teresa P. "Terry" Hughes	Marguerite Archie‑Hudson	Gwen Moore	Curtis Tucker, Jr.	Gerald N. Felando	Paul Horcher	Richard Floyd	Willard H. Murray, Jr.	Richard Polanco	Lucille Roybal-Allard	Dave Elder	Tom Mays	Xavier Becerra	Sally Tanner	Paul A. Woodruff	Bill Lancaster	Bob Epple	Ross Johnson	Jim Brulte	Gerald R. "Jerry" Eaves	John Lewis	Steve Clute	Nolan Frizzelle	Gil Ferguson	Doris Allen	Tom Umberg	David G. Kelley	Robert C. Frazee	Dede Alpert	Tricia Hunter	Carol Bentley	Mike Gotch	Peter R. "Pete" Chacon	Stephen Peace
1993–1994	Dan Hauser	Stan Statham	Bernie Richter	David Knowles	Barbara Alby	Vivien Bronshvag	Valerie K. Brown	Thomas M. Hannigan	Phillip Isenberg	Larry Bowler	Bob Campbell	John L. Burton	Willie Brown	Tom Bates	Richard K. Rainey	Barbara Lee	Dean Andal	Johan Klehs	Jackie Speier	Delaine Eastin	Byron D. Sher	John Vasconcellos	Dom Cortese	Chuck Quackenbush	Margaret Snyder	Sal Cannella	Bruce McPherson	Rusty Areias	Bill Jones	Jim Costa	Cruz Bustamante	Trice Harvey	Andrea Seastrand	Kathleen Honeycutt	Jack O'Connell	Pete Knight	Nao Takasugi	Paula Boland	Richard Katz	Barbara Friedman	Terry Friedman	Burt Margolin	Pat Nolan	Bill Hoge	Richard Polanco	Louis Caldera	Gwen Moore	Marguerite Archie‑Hudson	Diane Martinez	Martha Escutia	Curtis Tucker, Jr.	Willard H. Murray, Jr.	Debra Bowen	Betty Karnette	Juanita McDonald	Bob Epple	Hilda Solis	Grace Napolitano	Dick Mountjoy	Paul Horcher	Fred Aguiar	Joe Baca	Jim Brulte	Ted Weggeland	Paul A. Woodruff	Ray Haynes	Doris Allen	Curt Pringle	Tom Umberg	Gil Ferguson	Mickey Conroy	Ross Johnson	Bill Morrow	Robert C. Frazee	Jan Goldsmith	Mike Gotch	Tom Connolly	Dede Alpert	Stephen Peace	Julie Bornstein
1995–1996	Dan Hauser	Tom Woods	Bernie Richter	Thomas "Rico" Oller	Barbara Alby	Kerry Mazzoni	Valerie K. Brown	Thomas M. Hannigan	Phillip Isenberg	Larry Bowler	Bob Campbell	John L. Burton	Willie Brown	Tom Bates	Richard K. Rainey	Barbara Lee	Michael Machado	Michael Sweeney	Jackie Speier	Liz Figueroa	Byron D. Sher	John Vasconcellos	Dom Cortese	Jim Cunneen	George House	Sal Cannella	Bruce McPherson	Peter Frusetta	Charles Poochigian	Brian Setencich	Cruz Bustamante	Trice Harvey	Tom J. Bordonaro, Jr.	Keith Olberg	Brooks Firestone	Pete Knight	Nao Takasugi	Paula Boland	Richard Katz	Barbara Friedman	Sheila Kuehl	Wally Knox	James E. Rogan	Bill Hoge	Antonio Villaraigosa	Louis Caldera	Kevin Murray	Marguerite Archie‑Hudson	Diane Martinez	Martha Escutia	Curtis Tucker, Jr.	Willard H. Murray, Jr.	Debra Bowen	Steven T. Kuykendall	Dick Floyd	Phil Hawkins	Martin Gallegos	Grace Napolitano	Bob Margett	Paul Horcher	Fred Aguiar	Joe Baca	Jim Brulte	Ted Weggeland	Brett Granlund	Bruce Thompson	Scott Baugh	Curt Pringle	Jim Morrissey	Marilyn Brewer	Mickey Conroy	Dick Ackerman	Bill Morrow	Howard Kaloogian	Jan Goldsmith	Susan Davis	Steve Baldwin	Dede Alpert	Denise Moreno Ducheny	Jim Battin
1997–1998	Virginia Strom-Martin	Tom Woods	Bernie Richter	Thomas "Rico" Oller	Barbara Alby	Kerry Mazzoni	Valerie K. Brown	Helen Thomson	Deborah Ortiz	Larry Bowler	Tom Torlakson	Kevin Shelley	Carole Migden	Dion Aroner	Lynne Leach	Don Perata	Michael Machado	Michael Sweeney	Lou Papan	Liz Figueroa	Ted Lempert	Elaine Alquist	Mike Honda	Jim Cunneen	George House	Dennis Cardoza	Fred Keeley	Peter Frusetta	Charles Poochigian	Robert Prenter	Cruz Bustamante	Roy Ashburn	Tom J. Bordonaro, Jr.	Keith Olberg	Brooks Firestone	George Runner	Nao Takasugi	Tom McClintock	Tony Cardenas	Robert Hertzberg	Sheila Kuehl	Wally Knox	Scott Wildman	Jack Scott	Antonio Villaraigosa	Gil Cedillo	Kevin Murray	Rod Wright	Diane Martinez	Martha Escutia	Edward Vincent	Carl Washington	Debra Bowen	Steven T. Kuykendall	Dick Floyd	Sally Havice	Martin Gallegos	Grace Napolitano	Bob Margett	Gary Miller	Fred Aguiar	Joe Baca	Bill Leonard	Rod Pacheco	Brett Granlund	Bruce Thompson	Scott Baugh	Curt Pringle	Jim Morrissey	Marilyn Brewer	Bill Campbell	Dick Ackerman	Bill Morrow	Howard Kaloogian	Jan Goldsmith	Susan Davis	Steve Baldwin	Howard Wayne	Denise Moreno Ducheny	Jim Battin
1999–2000	Virginia Strom-Martin	Richard Dickerson	Samuel M. Aanestad	Thomas "Rico" Oller	Dave Cox	Kerry Mazzoni	Pat Wiggins	Helen Thomson	Darrell Steinberg	Anthony Pescetti	Tom Torlakson	Kevin Shelley	Carole Migden	Dion Aroner	Lynne Leach	Audie Bock	Michael Machado	Ellen M. Corbett	Lou Papan	John A. Dutra	Ted Lempert	Elaine Alquist	Mike Honda	Jim Cunneen	George House	Dennis Cardoza	Fred Keeley	Peter Frusetta	Mike Briggs	Dean Florez	Sarah Reyes	Roy Ashburn	Abel Maldonado	Keith Olberg	Hannah-Beth Jackson	George Runner	Tony Strickland	Tom McClintock	Tony Cardenas	Robert Hertzberg	Sheila Kuehl	Wally Knox	Scott Wildman	Jack Scott	Antonio Villaraigosa	Gil Cedillo	Herb Wesson	Rod Wright	Gloria Romero	Marco Antonio Firebaugh	Edward Vincent	Carl Washington	George Nakano	Alan Lowenthal	Dick Floyd	Sally Havice	Martin Gallegos	Thomas Calderon	Bob Margett	Bob Pacheco	Nell Soto	John Longville	Bill Leonard	Rod Pacheco	Brett Granlund	Bruce Thompson	Scott Baugh	Ken Maddox	Lou Correa	Marilyn Brewer	Bill Campbell	Dick Ackerman	Patricia C. Bates	Howard Kaloogian	Charlene Zettel	Susan Davis	Steve Baldwin	Howard Wayne	Denise Moreno Ducheny	Jim Battin
2001–2002	Virginia Strom-Martin	Richard Dickerson	Samuel M. Aanestad	Tim Leslie	Dave Cox	Joseph Nation	Pat Wiggins	Helen Thomson	Darrell Steinberg	Anthony Pescetti	Joe Canciamilla	Kevin Shelley	Carole Migden	Dion Aroner	Lynne Leach	Wilma Chan	Barbara S. Matthews	Ellen M. Corbett	Lou Papan	John A. Dutra	S. Joseph Simitian	Elaine Alquist	Manny Diaz	Rebecca Cohn	Dave Cogdill	Dennis Cardoza	Fred Keeley	Simon Salinas	Mike Briggs	Dean Florez	Sarah Reyes	Roy Ashburn	Abel Maldonado	Phil Wyman	Hannah-Beth Jackson	George Runner	Tony Strickland	Keith Richman	Tony Cardenas	Robert Hertzberg	Fran Pavley	Paul Koretz	Dario Frommer	Carol Liu	Jackie Goldberg	Gil Cedillo	Herb Wesson	Rod Wright	Judy Chu	Marco Antonio Firebaugh	Jerome Horton	Carl Washington	George Nakano	Alan Lowenthal	Jenny Oropeza	Sally Havice	Ed Chavez	Thomas Calderon	Dennis Mountjoy	Bob Pacheco	Gloria Negrete McLeod	John Longville	Bill Leonard	Rod Pacheco	Russ Bogh	Dennis Hollingsworth	Tom Harman	Ken Maddox	Lou Correa	John Campbell	Bill Campbell	Lynn Daucher	Patricia C. Bates	Mark Wyland	Charlene Zettel	Christine Kehoe	Jay La Suer	Howard Wayne	Juan Vargas	David G. Kelley
2003–2004	Patty Berg	Doug LaMalfa	Rick Keene	Tim Leslie	Dave Cox	Joseph Nation	Pat Wiggins	Lois Wolk	Darrell Steinberg	Alan Nakanishi	Joe Canciamilla	Leland Yee	Mark Leno	Loni Hancock	Guy S. Houston	Wilma Chan	Barbara S. Matthews	Ellen M. Corbett	Gene Mullin	John A. Dutra	S. Joseph Simitian	Sally J. Lieber	Manny Diaz	Rebecca Cohn	Dave Cogdill	Greg Aghazarian	John Laird	Simon Salinas	Steven N. Samuelian	Nicole Parra	Sarah Reyes	Kevin McCarthy	Abel Maldonado	Bill Maze	Hannah-Beth Jackson	Sharon Runner	Tony Strickland	Keith Richman	Cindy Montañez	Lloyd E. Levine	Fran Pavley	Paul Koretz	Dario Frommer	Carol Liu	Jackie Goldberg	Fabian Núñez	Herb Wesson	Mark Ridley-Thomas	Judy Chu	Marco Antonio Firebaugh	Jerome Horton	Mervyn M. Dymally	George Nakano	Alan Lowenthal	Jenny Oropeza	Rudy Bermúdez	Ed Chavez	Ronald Calderon	Dennis Mountjoy	Bob Pacheco	Gloria Negrete McLeod	John Longville	Robert Dutton	John J. Benoit	Russ Bogh	Ray Haynes	Tom Harman	Ken Maddox	Lou Correa	John Campbell	Todd Spitzer	Lynn Daucher	Patricia C. Bates	Mark Wyland	George A. Plescia	Christine Kehoe	Jay La Suer	Shirley Horton	Juan Vargas	Bonnie Garcia
2005–2006	Patty Berg	Doug LaMalfa	Rick Keene	Tim Leslie	Roger Niello	Joseph Nation	Noreen Evans	Lois Wolk	Dave Jones	Alan Nakanishi	Joe Canciamilla	Leland Yee	Mark Leno	Loni Hancock	Guy S. Houston	Wilma Chan	Barbara S. Matthews	Johan Klehs	Gene Mullin	Alberto Torrico	Ira Ruskin	Sally J. Lieber	Joe Coto	Rebecca Cohn	Dave Cogdill	Greg Aghazarian	John Laird	Simon Salinas	Michael Villines	Nicole Parra	Juan Arambula	Kevin McCarthy	Sam Blakeslee	Bill Maze	Pedro Nava	Sharon Runner	Audra Strickland	Keith Richman	Cindy Montañez	Lloyd E. Levine	Fran Pavley	Paul Koretz	Dario Frommer	Carol Liu	Jackie Goldberg	Fabian Núñez	Karen Bass	Mark Ridley-Thomas	Judy Chu	Hector De La Torre	Jerome Horton	Mervyn M. Dymally	Mike Gordon	Betty Karnette	Jenny Oropeza	Rudy Bermúdez	Ed Chavez	Ronald Calderon	Dennis Mountjoy	Bob Huff	Gloria Negrete McLeod	Joe Baca, Jr.	Bill Emmerson	John J. Benoit	Russ Bogh	Ray Haynes	Tom Harman	Van Tran	Tom Umberg	Chuck DeVore	Todd Spitzer	Lynn Daucher	Mimi Walters	Mark Wyland	George A. Plescia	Lori Saldaña	Jay La Suer	Shirley Horton	Juan Vargas	Bonnie Garcia
2007–2008	Patty Berg	Doug LaMalfa	Rick Keene	Ted Gaines	Roger Niello	Jared Huffman	Noreen Evans	Lois Wolk	Dave Jones	Alan Nakanishi	Mark DeSaulnier	Fiona Ma	Mark Leno	Loni Hancock	Guy S. Houston	Sandre Swanson	Cathleen Galgiani	Mary Hayashi	Gene Mullin	Alberto Torrico	Ira Ruskin	Sally J. Lieber	Joe Coto	Jim Beall, Jr.	Tom Berryhill	Greg Aghazarian	John Laird	Anna Caballero	Michael Villines	Nicole Parra	Juan Arambula	Jean Fuller	Sam Blakeslee	Bill Maze	Pedro Nava	Sharon Runner	Audra Strickland	Cameron Smyth	Felipe Fuentes	Lloyd E. Levine	Julia Brownley	Mike Feuer	Paul Krekorian	Anthony Portantino	Kevin de León	Fabian Núñez	Karen Bass	Mike Davis	Mike Eng	Hector De La Torre	Curren Price	Mervyn M. Dymally	Ted Lieu	Betty Karnette	Laura Richardson	Tony Mendoza	Edward Hernández	Charles Calderon	Anthony Adams	Bob Huff	Nell Soto	Wilmer Carter	Bill Emmerson	John J. Benoit	Paul Cook	Kevin Jeffries	Jim Silva	Van Tran	Jose Solorio	Chuck DeVore	Todd Spitzer	Michael D. Duvall	Mimi Walters	Martin Garrick	George A. Plescia	Lori Saldaña	Joel Anderson	Shirley Horton	Mary Salas	Bonnie Garcia
2009–2010	Wesley Chesbro	Jim Nielsen	Dan Logue	Ted Gaines	Roger Niello	Jared Huffman	Noreen Evans	Mariko Yamada	Dave Jones	Alyson Huber	Tom Torlakson	Fiona Ma	Tom Ammiano	Nancy Skinner	Joan Buchanan	Sandre Swanson	Cathleen Galgiani	Mary Hayashi	Jerry Hill	Alberto Torrico	Ira Ruskin	Paul Fong	Joe Coto	Jim Beall, Jr.	Tom Berryhill	Bill Berryhill	Bill Monning	Anna Caballero	Michael Villines	Danny Gilmore	Juan Arambula	Jean Fuller	Sam Blakeslee	Connie Conway	Pedro Nava	Steve Knight	Audra Strickland	Cameron Smyth	Felipe Fuentes	Bob Blumenfield	Julia Brownley	Mike Feuer	Paul Krekorian	Anthony Portantino	Kevin de León	John Pérez	Karen Bass	Mike Davis	Mike Eng	Hector De La Torre	Steven Bradford	Isadore Hall	Ted Lieu	Bonnie Lowenthal	Warren T. Furutani	Tony Mendoza	Edward Hernández	Charles Calderon	Anthony Adams	Curt Hagman	Norma Torres	Wilmer Carter	Bill Emmerson	Brian Nestande	Paul Cook	Kevin Jeffries	Jim Silva	Van Tran	Jose Solorio	Chuck DeVore	Jeff Miller	Michael D. Duvall	Diane Harkey	Martin Garrick	Nathan Fletcher	Lori Saldaña	Joel Anderson	Marty Block	Mary Salas	Manuel Perez
2011–2012	Wesley Chesbro	Jim Nielsen	Dan Logue	Beth Gaines	Richard Pan	Jared Huffman	Michael Allen	Mariko Yamada	Roger Dickinson	Alyson Huber	Susan Bonilla	Fiona Ma	Tom Ammiano	Nancy Skinner	Joan Buchanan	Sandre Swanson	Cathleen Galgiani	Mary Hayashi	Jerry Hill	Bob Wieckowski	Rich Gordon	Paul Fong	Nora Campos	Jim Beall, Jr.	Kristin Olsen	Bill Berryhill	Bill Monning	Luis Alejo	Linda Halderman	David Valadao	Henry Perea	Shannon Grove	Katcho Achadjian	Connie Conway	Das Williams	Steve Knight	Jeff Gorell	Cameron Smyth	Felipe Fuentes	Bob Blumenfield	Julia Brownley	Mike Feuer	Mike Gatto	Anthony Portantino	Gil Cedillo	John Pérez	Holly Mitchell	Mike Davis	Mike Eng	Ricardo Lara	Steven Bradford	Isadore Hall	Betsy Butler	Bonnie Lowenthal	Warren T. Furutani	Tony Mendoza	Roger Hernandez	Charles Calderon	Tim Donnelly	Curt Hagman	Norma Torres	Wilmer Carter	Mike Morrell	Brian Nestande	Paul Cook	Kevin Jeffries	Jim Silva	Allan Mansoor	Jose Solorio	Don Wagner	Jeff Miller	Chris Norby	Diane Harkey	Martin Garrick	Nathan Fletcher	Toni Atkins	Brian Jones	Marty Block	Ben Hueso	Manuel Perez
2013–2014	Brian Dahle	Wesley Chesbro	Dan Logue	Mariko Yamada	Frank Bigelow	Beth Gaines	Roger Dickinson	Ken Cooley	Richard Pan	Marc Levine	Jim Frazier	Kristin Olsen	Susan Eggman	Susan Bonilla	Nancy Skinner	Joan Buchanan	Tom Ammiano	Rob Bonta	Phil Ting	Bill Quirk	Adam Gray	Kevin Mullin	Jim Patterson	Rich Gordon	Bob Wieckowski	Connie Conway	Nora Campos	Paul Fong	Mark Stone	Luis Alejo	Henry Perea	Rudy Salas	Tim Donnelly	Shannon Grove	Katcho Achadjian	Steve Fox	Das Williams	Scott Wilk	Raul Bocanegra	Mike Morrell	Chris Holden	Brian Nestande	Mike Gatto	Jeff Gorell	Bob Blumenfield	Adrin Nazarian	Cheryl Brown	Roger Hernandez	Ed Chau	Richard Bloom	Jimmy Gomez	Norma Torres	John Pérez	Holly Mitchell	Curt Hagman	V. Manuel Perez	Ian Calderon	Cristina Garcia	Reggie Jones-Sawyer	Eric Linder	Jose Medina	Steven Bradford	Anthony Rendon	Isadore Hall, III	Sharon Quirk‑Silva	Al Muratsuchi	Melissa Melendez	Don Wagner	Tom Daly	Bonnie Lowenthal	Brian Jones	Travis Allen	Diane Harkey	Allan Mansoor	Marie Waldron	Rocky Chavez	Brian Maienschein	Toni Atkins	Shirley Weber	Ben Hueso
2015–2016	Brian Dahle	Jim Wood	James Gallagher	Bill Dodd	Frank Bigelow	Beth Gaines	Kevin McCarty	Ken Cooley	Jim Cooper	Marc Levine	Jim Frazier	Kristin Olsen	Susan Eggman	Susan Bonilla	Tony Thurmond	Catharine Baker	David Chiu	Rob Bonta	Phil Ting	Bill Quirk	Adam Gray	Kevin Mullin	Jim Patterson	Rich Gordon	Kansen Chu	Devon Mathis	Nora Campos	Evan Low	Mark Stone	Luis Alejo	Henry Perea	Rudy Salas	Jay Obernolte	Shannon Grove	Katcho Achadjian	Tom Lackey	Das Williams	Scott Wilk	Patty Lopez	Marc Steinorth	Chris Holden	Chad Mayes	Mike Gatto	Jacqui Irwin	Matt Dababneh	Adrin Nazarian	Cheryl Brown	Roger Hernandez	Ed Chau	Richard Bloom	Jimmy Gomez	Freddie Rodriguez	Miguel Santiago	Sebastian Ridley‑Thomas	Ling Ling Chang	Eduardo Garcia	Ian Calderon	Cristina Garcia	Reggie Jones-Sawyer	Eric Linder	Jose Medina	Autumn Burke	Anthony Rendon	Mike Gipson	Young Kim	David Hadley	Melissa Melendez	Don Wagner	Tom Daly	Patrick O'Donnell	Brian Jones	Travis Allen	Bill Brough	Matthew Harper	Marie Waldron	Rocky Chavez	Brian Maienschein	Toni Atkins	Shirley Weber	Lorena Gonzalez Fletcher
2017–2018	Brian Dahle	Jim Wood	James Gallagher	Cecilia Aguiar-Curry	Frank Bigelow	Kevin Kiley	Kevin McCarty	Ken Cooley	Jim Cooper	Marc Levine	Jim Frazier	Heath Flora	Susan Eggman	Tim Grayson	Tony Thurmond	Catharine Baker	David Chiu	Rob Bonta	Phil Ting	Bill Quirk	Adam Gray	Kevin Mullin	Jim Patterson	Marc Berman	Kansen Chu	Devon Mathis	Ash Kalra	Evan Low	Mark Stone	Anna Caballero	Joaquin Arambula	Rudy Salas	Jay Obernolte	Vince Fong	Jordan Cunningham	Tom Lackey	Monique Limón	Dante Acosta	Raul Bocanegra	Marc Steinorth	Chris Holden	Chad Mayes	Laura Friedman	Jacqui Irwin	Matt Dababneh	Adrin Nazarian	Eloise Reyes	Blanca Rubio	Ed Chau	Richard Bloom	Wendy Carrillo	Freddie Rodriguez	Miguel Santiago	Sebastian Ridley‑Thomas	Phillip Chen	Eduardo Garcia	Ian Calderon	Cristina Garcia	Reggie Jones-Sawyer	Sabrina Cervantes	Jose Medina	Autumn Burke	Anthony Rendon	Mike Gipson	Sharon Quirk-Silva	Al Muratsuchi	Melissa Melendez	Steven Choi	Tom Daly	Patrick O'Donnell	Randy Voepel	Travis Allen	Bill Brough	Matthew Harper	Marie Waldron	Rocky Chavez	Brian Maienschein	Todd Gloria	Shirley Weber	Lorena Gonzalez Fletcher
2019–2020	Megan Dahle	Jim Wood	James Gallagher	Cecilia Aguiar-Curry	Frank Bigelow	Kevin Kiley	Kevin McCarty	Ken Cooley	Jim Cooper	Marc Levine	Jim Frazier	Heath Flora	Susan Eggman	Tim Grayson	Buffy Wicks	Rebecca Bauer‑Kahan	David Chiu	Rob Bonta	Phil Ting	Bill Quirk	Adam Gray	Kevin Mullin	Jim Patterson	Marc Berman	Kansen Chu	Devon Mathis	Ash Kalra	Evan Low	Mark Stone	Robert Rivas	Joaquin Arambula	Rudy Salas	Jay Obernolte	Vince Fong	Jordan Cunningham	Tom Lackey	Monique Limón	Christy Smith	Luz Rivas	James Ramos	Chris Holden	Chad Mayes	Laura Friedman	Jacqui Irwin	Jesse Gabriel	Adrin Nazarian	Eloise Reyes	Blanca Rubio	Ed Chau	Richard Bloom	Wendy Carrillo	Freddie Rodriguez	Miguel Santiago	Sydney Kamlager	Phillip Chen	Eduardo Garcia	Ian Calderon	Cristina Garcia	Reggie Jones-Sawyer	Sabrina Cervantes	Jose Medina	Autumn Burke	Anthony Rendon	Mike Gipson	Sharon Quirk-Silva	Al Muratsuchi	Melissa Melendez	Steven Choi	Tom Daly	Patrick O'Donnell	Randy Voepel	Tyler Diep	Bill Brough	Cottie Petrie‑Norris	Marie Waldron	Tasha Boerner Horvath	Brian Maienschein	Todd Gloria	Shirley Weber	Lorena Gonzalez Fletcher
2021–2022	Megan Dahle	Jim Wood	James Gallagher	Cecilia Aguiar-Curry	Frank Bigelow	Kevin Kiley	Kevin McCarty	Ken Cooley	Jim Cooper	Marc Levine	Jim Frazier	Heath Flora	Carlos Villapudua	Tim Grayson	Buffy Wicks	Rebecca Bauer‑Kahan	David Chiu	Mia Bonta	Phil Ting	Bill Quirk	Adam Gray	Kevin Mullin	Jim Patterson	Marc Berman	Alex Lee	Devon Mathis	Ash Kalra	Evan Low	Mark Stone	Robert Rivas	Joaquin Arambula	Rudy Salas	Thurston Smith	Vince Fong	Jordan Cunningham	Tom Lackey	Steve Bennett	Suzette Martinez Valladares	Luz Rivas	James Ramos	Chris Holden	Chad Mayes	Laura Friedman	Jacqui Irwin	Jesse Gabriel	Adrin Nazarian	Eloise Reyes	Blanca Rubio	Ed Chau	Richard Bloom	Wendy Carrillo	Freddie Rodriguez	Miguel Santiago	Sydney Kamlager	Phillip Chen	Eduardo Garcia	Lisa Calderon	Cristina Garcia	Reggie Jones-Sawyer	Sabrina Cervantes	Jose Medina	Autumn Burke	Anthony Rendon	Mike Gipson	Sharon Quirk-Silva	Al Muratsuchi	Kelly Seyarto	Steven Choi	Tom Daly	Patrick O'Donnell	Randy Voepel	Janet Nguyen	Laurie Davies	Cottie Petrie‑Norris	Marie Waldron	Tasha Boerner Horvath	Brian Maienschein	Chris Ward	Akilah Weber	Lorena Gonzalez Fletcher
Assembly Session	1st	2nd	3rd	4th	5th	6th	7th	8th	9th	10th	11th	12th	13th	14th	15th	16th	17th	18th	19th	20th	21st	22nd	23rd	24th	25th	26th	27th	28th	29th	30th	31st	32nd	33rd	34th	35th	36th	37th	38th	39th	40th	41st	42nd	43rd	44th	45th	46th	47th	48th	49th	50th	51st	52nd	53rd	54th	55th	56th	57th	58th	59th	60th	61st	62nd	63rd	64th	65th	66th	67th	68th	69th	70th	71st	72nd	73rd	74th	75th	76th	77th	78th	79th	80th
Assembly Session	District																																																																															

== Sources ==
- Legislative History - California State Capitol Museum
- 2016 Election Results- California Secretary of State
- 2008 Election Results - California Secretary of State
- 2006 Election Results - California Secretary of State
- 2004 Election Results - California Secretary of State
- 2002 Election Results - California Secretary of State
- 2000 Election Results - California Secretary of State
- 1998 Election Results - California Secretary of State
- 1996 Election Results - California Secretary of State
- JoinCalifornia - an online archive of California election results
