= Senator Gregorio =

Senator Gregorio may refer to:

- Arlen F. Gregorio (born 1931), California State Senate
- John T. Gregorio (1928–2013), New Jersey State Senate

== See also ==
- Senator Gregory (disambiguation)
