= Senator Gregory =

Senator Gregory may refer to:

- David Gregory (politician) (fl. 2010s–2020s), Missouri State Senate
- Greg Gregory (born 1963), South Carolina State Senate
- Isaac Gregory (1737– 1800), North Carolina State Senator
- Ivey William Gregory (1906–1984), Georgia State Senate
- James J. H. Gregory (1827–1910), Massachusetts State Senate
- Kurtis Gregory (born 1986), Missouri State Senate
- Robert Gregory (Indiana judge) (1811–1885), Indiana State Senate
- Sara Beth Gregory (born 1982), Kentucky State Senate
- Vincent Gregory (born 1948), Michigan State Senate

== See also ==
- Senator Gregorio (disambiguation)
