= Walter W. Stiern =

American politician

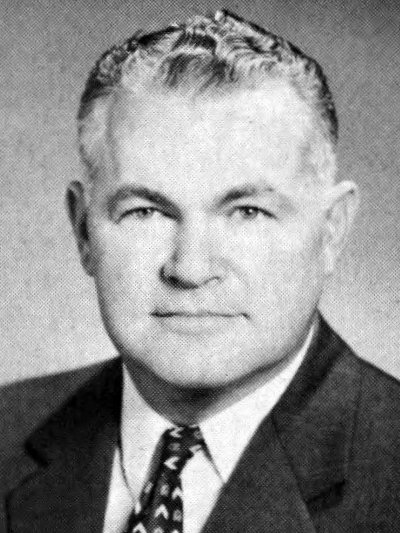

Member of the California Senate from the 16th district
- In office December 2, 1974 – November 30, 1986
- Preceded by: George N. Zenovich
- Succeeded by: Don Rogers

Member of the California Senate from the 18th district
- In office January 2, 1967 – November 30, 1974
- Preceded by: Clark L. Bradley
- Succeeded by: Omer L. Rains

Member of the California Senate from the 34th district
- In office January 5, 1959 – January 2, 1967
- Preceded by: Jess R. Dorsey
- Succeeded by: John G. Schmitz

Personal details
- Born: March 8, 1914 San Diego, California, U.S.
- Died: February 21, 1988 (aged 73) Bakersfield, California, U.S.
- Party: Democratic
- Spouse: Alysjune Stiern (m. 1938)
- Children: 2
- Education: Bakersfield College; Washington State University

Military service
- Branch/service: United States Army
- Battles/wars: World War II

Walter William Stiern (March 8, 1914 – February 21, 1988) was a Democratic California State Senator representing Kern County.

Although Stiern was born in San Diego, his family was originally from Bakersfield and moved back soon after he was born. Stiern attended Bakersfield College, then continued on to Washington State University where he received his Doctor of Veterinary Medicine. He returned to Bakersfield and set up a veterinary practice catering to the local agricultural community, taking a temporary leave to serve in World War II.

Stiern was elected to the State Senate in 1958, where he advocated on education, health and agricultural issues. He is primarily known for his work in the area of expanding California's higher education system: In 1960, he co-sponsored Assemblywoman Dorothy Donohoe's Donahoe Higher Education Act which reorganized the state's higher education system into the form it is in today: the "California State Colleges" (now known as the California State University system) was formally created as a statewide system, and from now on, the University of California, the state colleges, and the junior colleges were coordinated in their approach to providing higher education to the state's population.

Stiern became increasingly vocal during the 1960s about the fact that the junior colleges were the only segment of California public higher education which had not yet been integrated into a statewide system, and sponsored appropriate legislation to fix this. In 1967, the passage of Stiern's bill led to the transformation of the junior colleges into the California Community Colleges system.

For his home district, Stiern's work in the Senate produced California State College, Bakersfield, which became California State University, Bakersfield. The Walter W. Stiern Library on the CSUB campus is named after him. In 1990, two years after his death, the Legislature honored his contribution to the creation of the California Community Colleges by creating a short title based on his name for the relevant part of the California Education Code. Education Code Section 70900.5 provides that "this part shall be known, and may be cited, as the 'Walter Stiern Act.'"
