= Stanley Arnold =

American politician

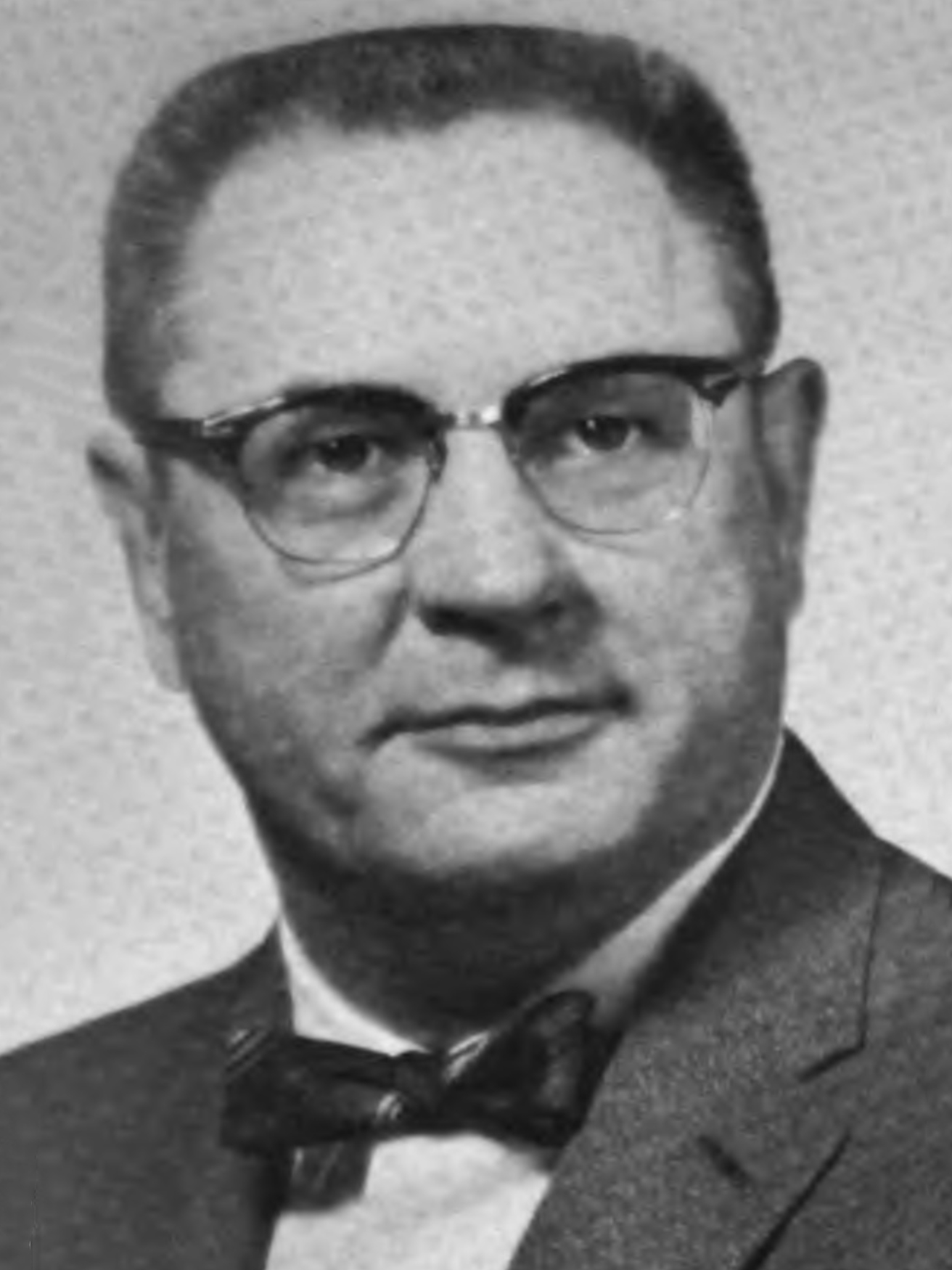

Member of the California Senate from the 1st district
- In office January 5, 1956 – July 16, 1965
- Preceded by: Dale C. Williams
- Succeeded by: Randolph Collier

Personal details
- Born: September 22, 1903 Crown Point, Indiana, U.S.
- Died: February 27, 1984 (aged 80) Susanville, California, U.S.
- Party: Democratic
- Spouse: Almida Lindquist (m. 1928)
- Children: Stanley Dawson

Stanley Arnold (September 22, 1903 – February 27, 1984) was an American politician who served in the California State Senate, representing the 1st District. In 1965 he was named judge of the Lassen County Superior Court by Governor Edmund G. (Pat) Brown Sr. and held that post until his retirement in 1972.

He was born Jacob Stanley Arnold on September 22, 1903, at Crown Point, Lake County, Indiana, of John Dawson and Mary (Weis) Arnold. He was married on May 18, 1928, at Susanville, Lassen County, California, to Svea Almida Lindquist. They had one child, Stanley Dawson Arnold, born 7 October 1931, an attorney (Arnold & Arnold) in Susanville California.

Senator Arnold died at Susanville on February 27, 1984.
