= Ernest LaCoste =

American politician

Member of the California State Assembly from the 30th district
- In office January 4, 1971 - January 8, 1973
- Preceded by: Clare Berryhill
- Succeeded by: John E. Thurman

Personal details
- Born: August 7, 1924 Modesto, California
- Died: April 1993 (aged 68–69)
- Party: Democratic
- Spouse: Jeanne Wright
- Children: 2

Ernest LaCoste (August 7, 1924 - April 1993) served in the California legislature representing the 30th District. During World War II he served in the United States Army.
