= Trice Harvey =

American politician in the state of California

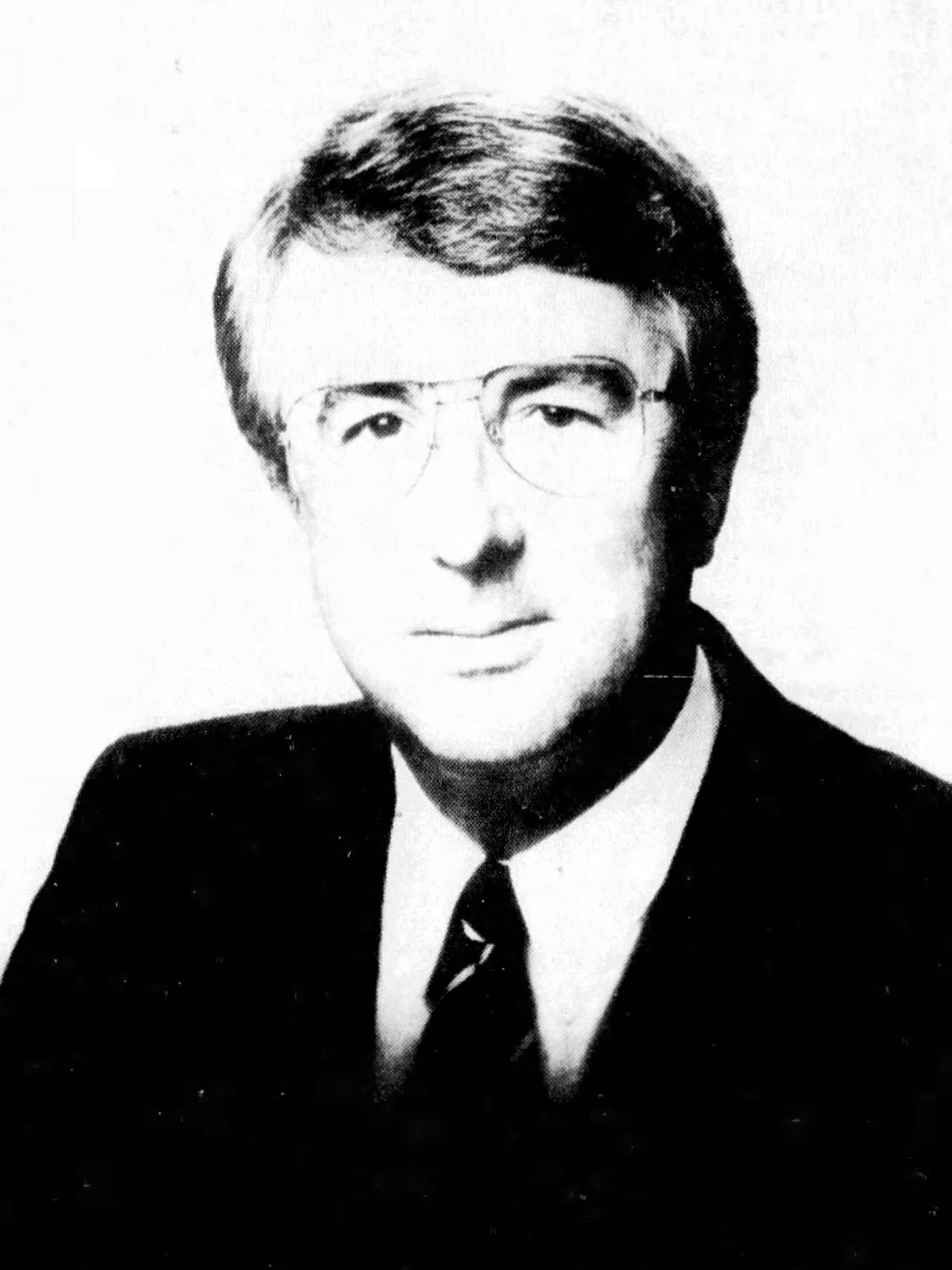

Member of the California State Assembly
- In office December 1, 1986 – November 30, 1996
- Preceded by: Don Rogers
- Succeeded by: Roy Ashburn
- Constituency: 33rd district (1986–1992); 32nd district (1992–1996)

Personal details
- Born: Trice Jeraine Harvey; July 15, 1936 Paragould, Arkansas, U.S.
- Died: January 31, 2017 (aged 80) Bakersfield, California, U.S.
- Party: Republican
- Spouse: Jacqueline (m. 1956, d. 2012)
- Children: 2
- Occupation: Health inspector

Trice Jeraine Harvey (July 14, 1936 – January 31, 2017) was an American politician in the state of California.

Born in Paragould, Arkansas, Trice graduated from Taft Union High School in Taft, California. He served on the Kern County, California Board of Supervisors from 1977 to 1987 and on the Rosedale School Board from 1972 to 1976. Trice also served as an inspector for the Kern County Board of Health. He served in the California State Assembly from 1986 to 1996. He was the Republican nominee for the 20th congressional district in 1996; he lost to Democratic incumbent Cal Dooley, receiving 39% of the vote. He later ran for Kern County assessor in 2006, which he also lost. Harvey died as a result of a fall.
