= Bud Collier =

American politician (1904–1996)

Member of the California State Assembly from the 61st district
- In office December 2, 1974 - November 30, 1978
- Preceded by: Henry Waxman
- Succeeded by: Dick Mountjoy

Member of the California State Assembly from the 54th district
- In office January 6, 1947 - November 30, 1974
- Preceded by: Ralph A. Beal
- Succeeded by: Frank Vicencia

Personal details
- Born: September 6, 1904 Wetumpka, Alabama
- Died: October 2, 1996 (aged 92) Montgomery, Alabama
- Party: Republican
- Education: Occidental College

Military service
- Branch/service: United States Army
- Battles/wars: World War II

John L. E. "Bud" Collier (September 6, 1904 – October 2, 1996) was an American politician in the state of California. He served in the California State Assembly as a Republican from 1946 to 1978. Collier represented the 54th district from 1946 to 1972 and the 61st district from 1972 to 1978, when he was defeated in the Republican primary.

Collier was born in Wetumpka, Alabama in 1904. He attended Occidental College and earned a Bachelor of Arts degree in economics in 1932. During World War II he served in the United States Army as a combat intelligence officer. Collier received military education at the Air Intelligence School in Pennsylvania and at the Prisoner of War Intelligence School in London, England.
