= Don Rogers (politician) =

American politician (1928–2018)

Member of the California Senate from the 17th district
- In office December 15, 1992 - November 30, 1996
- Preceded by: Henry J. Mello
- Succeeded by: William J. Knight

Member of the California Senate from the 16th district
- In office December 1, 1986 - December 15, 1992
- Preceded by: Walter W. Stiern
- Succeeded by: Phil Wyman

Member of the California State Assembly from the 33rd district
- In office December 4, 1978 - November 30, 1986
- Preceded by: Bill Thomas
- Succeeded by: Trice Harvey

Personal details
- Born: April 22, 1928 Natchitoches, Louisiana, U.S.
- Died: October 24, 2018 (aged 90)
- Party: Republican (Before 2000); American (2000–2018)
- Spouse: Marilyn
- Children: 3
- Education: Louisiana State University, Baton Rouge

Military service
- Branch/service: United States Marine Corps

Donald Augustine Rogers (April 22, 1928 – October 24, 2018) was an American politician in the state of California. He served in the California State Assembly as a Republican for the 33rd district from 1979 to 1986 and in the State Senate for the 16th and 17th district from 1986 to 1996.

Party political offices
Preceded by Diane Beall Templin	American nominee for President of the United States; 2000	Vacant Title next held by Robert Boyd
