= James M. Allen =

American politician

Member of the Illinois House of Representatives
- In office 1850–1852

James M. Allen was an American politician who served as a member of the Illinois House of Representatives. He served as a state representative for the 43rd District representing Henry, Rock Island, and Stark counties in the 17th Illinois General Assembly.
