= John E. Thurman =

American politician

John E. Thurman Jr.

Member of the California State Assembly from the 30th district
- In office January 8, 1973 - November 30, 1974
- Preceded by: Ernest LaCoste
- Succeeded by: Kenneth L. Maddy

Member of the California State Assembly from the 27th district
- In office December 2, 1974 - November 30, 1982
- Preceded by: Lou Papan
- Succeeded by: Gary Condit

Personal details
- Born: May 6, 1919 Richmond, California
- Died: July 27, 1983 (aged 64) Modesto, California
- Party: Democratic
- Spouse: Julia
- Children: 3

Military service
- Branch/service: United States Army
- Battles/wars: World War II

John E. Thurman Jr. (May 6, 1919 – July 27, 1983) was an American politician and World War II veteran, having served in the United States Army. A Democrat, he served in the California State Assembly from 1973 to 1982. Thurman served as chairman of the Agriculture Committee from 1974 to 1982. Prior to his time in the state assembly, he served on the Stanislaus County Board of Supervisors from 1970 to 1972. He died in 1983.

He was married to his wife, Julia, and had three children.

During his time in the legislature, Thurman voted for rape legislation and the "Use A Gun, Go To Prison" rule.
