= Dick Mountjoy =

American politician (1932–2015)

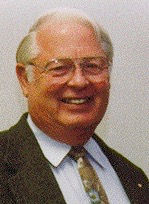

Member of the California Senate from the 29th district
- In office December 5, 1994 – November 30, 2000
- Preceded by: Frank Hill
- Succeeded by: Bob Margett

Member of the California State Assembly from the 59th district
- In office December 7, 1992 – January 23, 1995
- Preceded by: Xavier Becerra
- Succeeded by: Bob Margett

Member of the California State Assembly from the 42nd district
- In office December 6, 1982 – November 30, 1992
- Preceded by: William H. Ivers
- Succeeded by: Burt M. Margolin

Member of the California State Assembly from the 61st district
- In office December 4, 1978 – November 30, 1982
- Preceded by: Bud Collier
- Succeeded by: Bill Leonard

Personal details
- Born: January 13, 1932 Los Angeles, California, U.S.
- Died: May 18, 2015 (aged 83) Monrovia, California, U.S.
- Party: Republican
- Spouse: Earline Winnett (m. 1952; died 2009)
- Children: 3

Military service
- Branch/service: United States Navy
- Battles/wars: Korean War

Richard Lee Mountjoy (January 13, 1932 – May 18, 2015) was an American Republican politician from Monrovia, California. He served in the California State Assembly from 1978 to 1994, and the California State Senate from 1994 to 2000. He was also the Republican nominee for the U.S. Senate in 2006.

== Early and personal life ==
Mountjoy was born in Los Angeles, California and graduated from Monrovia-Arcadia-Duarte High School in 1950. He joined the US Navy and served overseas during the Korean War. After his navy service, he worked briefly as an auto mechanic. He then started the Mountjoy Construction Company with his brother, Gordon.

A life member of the Veterans of Foreign Wars, Mountjoy was married to Earline Winnett until her death in 2009. They had two sons, Michael and Dennis Lee, and one daughter, Judy. Dennis was a member of the California State Assembly, having represented his father's old district from 2000 to 2006.

== Political career ==
Mountjoy served as the mayor of Monrovia from 1968 to 1976. He served in the California State Assembly for the 61st, 42nd, and 59th districts from 1978 to 1995. From 1982 to 1984 he served as the California Assembly Republican Caucus Chair. While there he introduced California Proposition 187, which denied government services to illegal immigrants. He served in the California State Senate from 1994 to 2000 in California's 29th State Senate district. His political platform fit with that of the conservative wing of the Republican Party: he was anti-abortion, opposed same-sex marriage, and supported both the war in Iraq and possible military intervention in Iran. Mountjoy ran for lieutenant governor in 1998, finishing third in the Republican primary.

He ran for the U.S. Senate in 2006, winning the Republican nomination by default, as no other major Republican candidate had filed. On September 22, 2006, the Los Angeles Times reported that a statement in his website's biography, that he served in the Korean War aboard the USS Missouri, was incorrect; ship records later confirmed that he actually served aboard the USS Bremerton. Mountjoy said, "I think it was just something that somebody picked up, it didn’t come from me." However, the campaign of the Democratic incumbent, Dianne Feinstein, opined that the error raised enough doubts about Mountjoy's credibility that he was "not qualified to serve the people of California." Feinstein defeated Mountjoy by a wide margin, 59% to 35%, in the November 7, 2006 general election.

Mountjoy died on May 18, 2015, aged 83.

California Senate
Preceded by Frank Hill	California State Senate; 29th district December 5, 1994 - November 30, 2000	Succeeded by Bob Margett
Party political offices
Preceded by Tom Campbell	Republican Party nominee for United States Senator from California (Class 1); 2006	Succeeded by Elizabeth Emken
