= Randolph Collier =

American politician

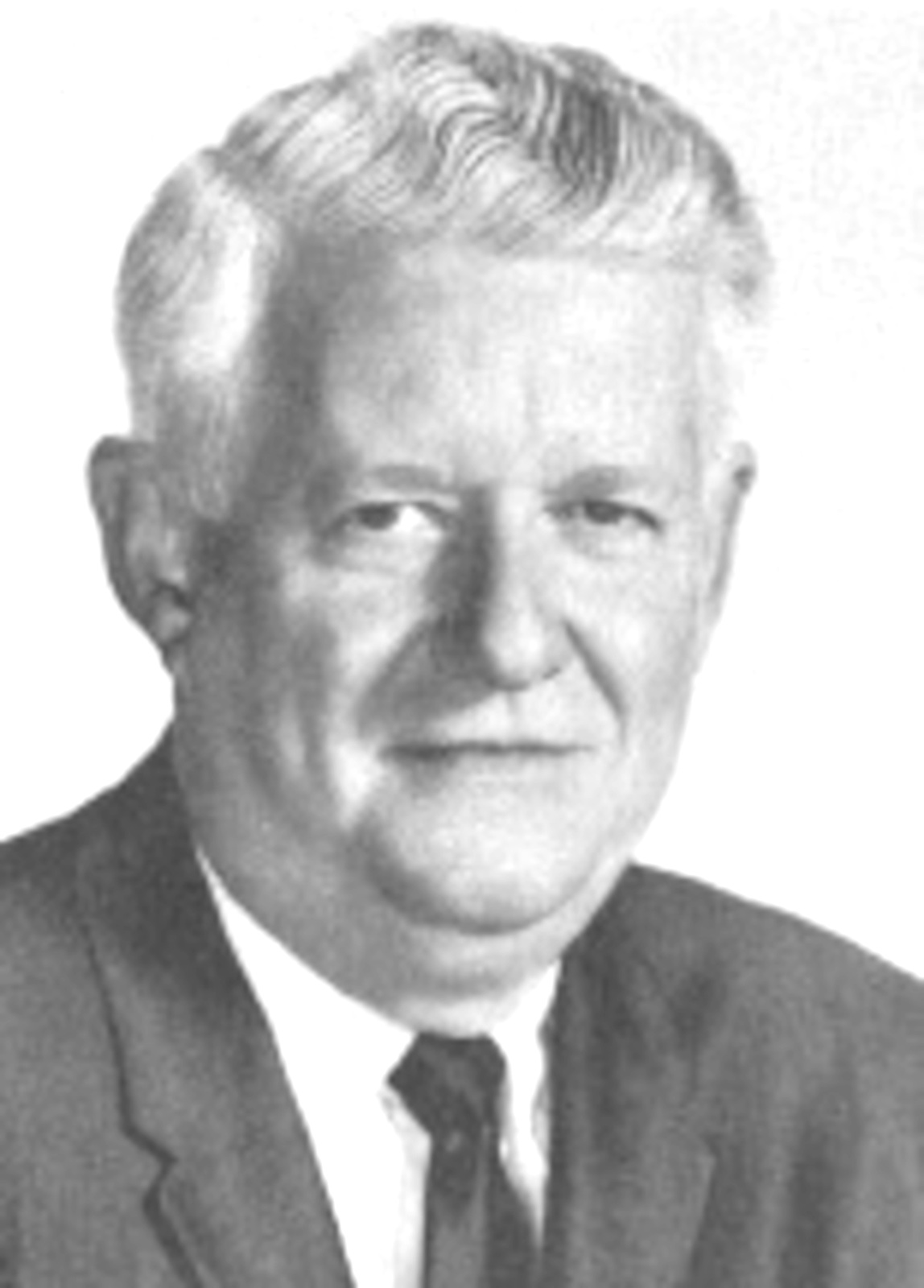
- Official portrait, 1963

Member of the California Senate
- In office January 2, 1939 – November 30, 1976
- Preceded by: Henry M. McGuinness
- Succeeded by: Ray E. Johnson
- Constituency: 2nd district (1939–1967); 1st district (1967–1976)

Personal details
- Born: July 26, 1902 Etna, California, U.S.
- Died: August 2, 1983 (aged 81) Sacramento, California, U.S.
- Party: Democratic (1959–1983); Republican (before 1959)
- Spouse(s): Aida (m. 1945; div. 1970) Barbara Ferris Hamoui
- Children: 7
- Education: University of California, Berkeley

Randolph Collier (July 26, 1902 – August 2, 1983) was a member of the California State Senate. He was Senator from California's 2nd senatorial district from 1939 to 1967, and from the First District from 1967 to 1976. Initially a member of the Republican Party, he moved to the Democratic Party in 1959.

Collier served as chairman of the California Senate Transportation Committee and was the sponsor and co-author of the Collier–Burns Highway Act of 1947, which laid the groundwork for the California Freeway and Expressway System. He was chairman of the Senate Interim Committee on Highways, Streets and Bridges. Collier was an opponent of rapid transit. A rest stop in Siskiyou County, where he lived nearly all of his life, is named after him, as is a tunnel on the Redwood Highway, U.S. Route 199.

In 1976, Collier was defeated for re-election by former state Assemblyman Ray E. Johnson and moved to Sacramento, where he spent the remainder of his life until dying of chronic pulmonary obstruction at the age of 81.

Political offices
Preceded by Henry M. McGuinness	Member of the California Senate from the 2nd district January 2, 1939 – January 2, 1967	Succeeded by Fred W. Marler Jr.
Preceded by Stanley Arnold	Member of the California Senate from the 1st district January 2, 1967 – November 30, 1976	Succeeded by Ray E. Johnson
