= Dale C. Williams =

American politician

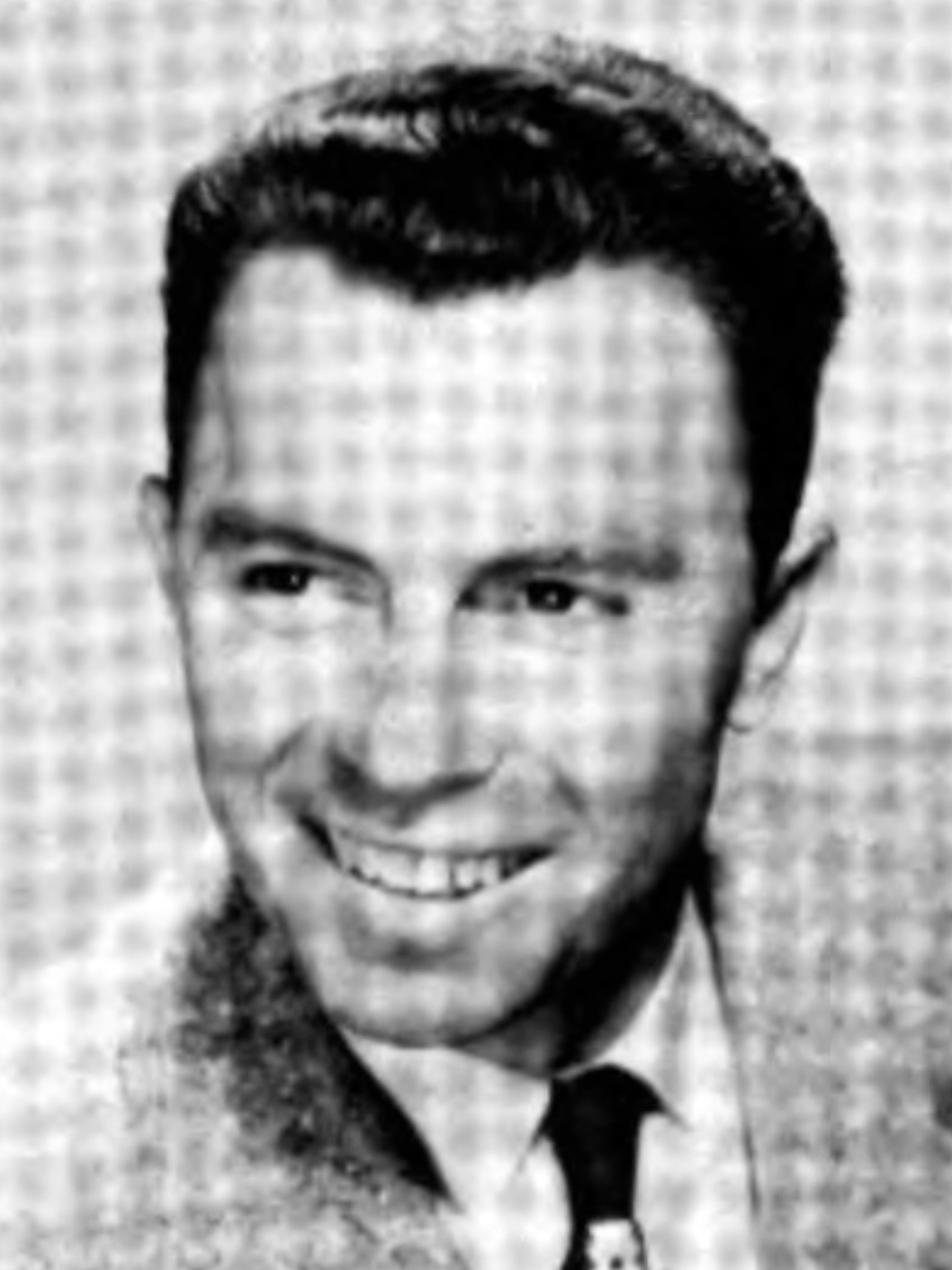

Member of the California Senate from the 1st district
- In office December 29, 1953 – May 12, 1955
- Preceded by: Harold J. Powers
- Succeeded by: Stanley Arnold

Personal details
- Born: March 2, 1920 Lava Hot Springs, Idaho, U.S.
- Died: May 12, 1955 (aged 35)
- Party: Democratic
- Spouse: Barbara Kimes
- Children: 3

Military service
- Branch/service: United States Army
- Battles/wars: World War II

Dale C. Williams (March 2, 1920 – May 12, 1955) served as a member of the California State Senate, representing the 1st District from 1953 to 1955. He died in office in 1955.

During World War II he served in the United States Army.
