= Arlen F. Gregorio =

American politician (born 1931)

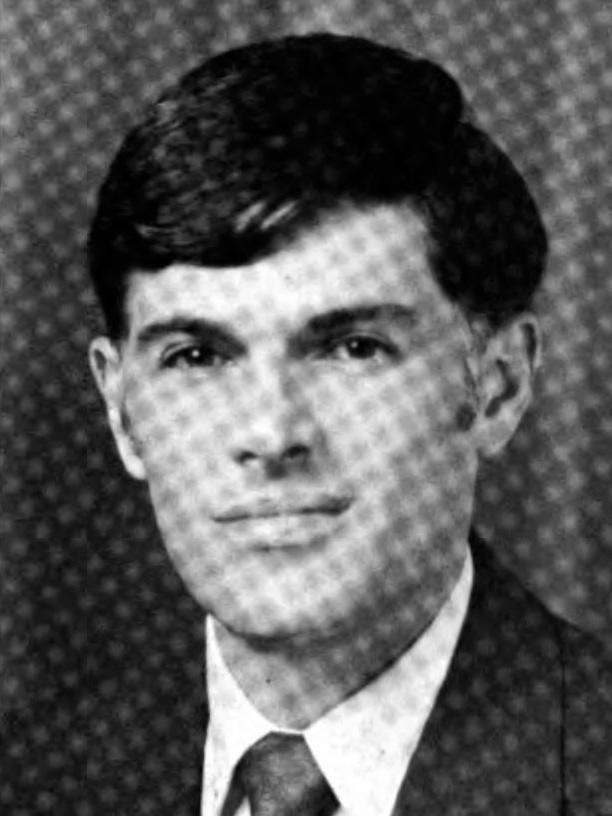
- Official portrait, 1971

Member of the San Mateo County Board of Supervisors for the 4th district
- In office November 21, 1979 – January 6, 1985
- Preceded by: William Royer
- Succeeded by: Tom Nolan

Member of the California Senate
- In office January 4, 1971 – November 30, 1978
- Preceded by: Richard J. Dolwig
- Succeeded by: Marz Garcia
- Constituency: 12th district (1971–1974); 10th district (1974–1978)

Personal details
- Born: Arlen Foster Gregorio; September 11, 1931 (age 95) San Francisco, California, U.S.
- Party: Democratic
- Spouse: Donna Prentice (m. 1960; sep. 1976)
- Children: 3
- Education: Stanford University; College of San Mateo
- Occupation: Commercial mediator
- Awards: China Service Medal
- Website: Official website

Military service
- Allegiance: United States of America
- Branch/service: United States Navy

Arlen Foster Gregorio (born September 11, 1931) is an American attorney, politician and commercial mediator. He was a member of the California State Senate from 1971 to 1978. As a Senator he chaired the Senate Health and Welfare Committee from 1979 to 1984 and was an elected member of the San Mateo County Board of Supervisors from 1979 to 1984. After leaving politics in 1985 he began a career in mediation.

== Early life and education ==
Gregorio was born in San Francisco on September 11, 1931 to a family who has lived in California for four generations. He grew up in the Bernal Heights district until his family moved to Burlingame, California, where he attended Hoover School, Burlingame High School and the College of San Mateo. Gregorio served as a U.S. Naval Air Officer for three years in the 1950s receiving the China Service Medal for combat duty. He received his bachelor's and law degrees from Stanford University in 1955. He was an adjunct faculty member at Stanford University, Notre Dame University in Belmont, and College of San Mateo.

== Career ==
Gregorio became a member of the California State Bar in 1955. He was a partner in general law practice from 1958 to 1970 and held the position of Assistant City Attorney for San Bruno from 1962 to 1970. He also chaired the San Mateo County Democratic Central Committee from 1964 to 1970.

=== Politics ===
In 1970, he was elected to represent San Mateo County in the California State Senate. According to fellow Senator Alan Robbins, Gregorio "refused special-interest money" and "contributions over $100". During his two terms in the Senate (1970 - 1978), Gregorio authored laws dealing with legislation and campaign finance reform, alcohol and drug abuse, the arts, environment, education and health. He was chairman of the Senate Health and Welfare Committee from 1973 to 1978. Gregorio had a particular interest in reforming campaign financing and the political process in general. His political reforms included allowing the public to attend state budget conference committee meetings and to access legislator committee voting results.

In 1975, Gregorio challenged then Governor Edmund G. Brown Jr. to a debate after the Governor vetoed his "alcohol tax bill." In 1976 he created legislation that would give members of the public the "voting majority on most regulatory boards." Gregorio lost his November 1978 Senate bid by a margin of only 90 votes after a vote recount. In 1979, he won a special election to the San Mateo County Board of Supervisors and was re-elected in 1980, serving through 1984. Gregorio's last political race was in 1984, when he left the Board of Supervisors to run again for the state Senate. In that political contest, Gregorio and his opponent, Becky Morgan, set a "new Senate campaign spending record" of $1.6 million.

=== Mediation ===
After leaving politics, Gregorio began an attorney mediation practice in San Francisco in 1985. He founded the non-profit, Peninsula Conflict Resolution Center in San Mateo, California in 1986. In 1989, he created the first law partnership that focused exclusively on the mediation of civil trial matters. The firm is known as Gregorio, Haldeman & Rotman and is located in San Francisco.

== Personal life ==
Gregorio learned the Transcendental Meditation technique after reading a 1971 article in The Wall Street Journal about it. He appeared with Maharishi Mahesh Yogi, Ellen Corby (The Waltons), Harold H. Bloomfield, Clint Eastwood and others on two episodes of the Merv Griffin show in 1975.

He has three sons by his first marriage and began his second marriage in 1980.
