= List of special elections to the California State Assembly =

Special elections to the California State Assembly are called by the Governor of California when a vacancy arises within the State Assembly. Special elections are conducted in two rounds. The first round is an open primary. The second round is cancelled if one of the candidates receives more than 50% of the vote in the first round. Prior to 2012, the top vote getter from each party in the first round would advance to the second round. Since the enactment of Proposition 14 in 2010 (which became effective 2012), the top two vote getters in the first round, regardless of party, advance to the second round.

Recall elections, the process by which voters petition for the removal of an elected official, are also included.

== List of special elections ==
The dates listed are the second round unless a winner is determined in the primary round (when a candidate receives more than 50% of the vote).

District	Date	Predecessor	Winner
30	January 23, 1962	Ralph Brown (D)	John Veneman (R)
8	November 5, 1962	Jimmy Hicks (D)	Walter Powers (D)
49	May 9, 1967	Charles Edward Chapel (R)	Robert G. Beverly (R)
30	May 20, 1969	John Veneman (R)	Clare Berryhill (R)
34	June 17, 1969	Alan Pattee (R)	Bob Wood (R)
48	November 16, 1971	David Roberti (D)	Bill Brophy (R)
76	November 16, 1971	Pete Wilson (R)	Bob Wilson (D)
49	June 6, 1972	Peter F. Schabarum (R)	William H. Lancaster (R)
38	May 29, 1973	Carley V. Porter (D)	Robert M. McLennan (R)
67	June 26, 1973	Larry Townsend (D)	Paul Bannai (R)
80	June 26, 1973	John Stull (R)	William A. Craven (R)
12	September 4, 1973	Robert T. Monagan (R)	Douglas F. Carter (R)
14	September 4, 1973	Robert W. Crown (D)	Bill Lockyer (D)
15	March 4, 1975	Carlos Bee (D)	Floyd Mori (D)
4	December 2, 1975	Edwin L. Z'berg (D)	Vic Fazio (D)
47	July 15, 1975	Bill Greene (D)	Teresa Hughes (D)
46	June 2, 1977	Charles Warren (D)	Mike Roos (D)
44	June 28, 1977	Alan Sieroty (D)	Mel Levine (D)
55	June 3, 1986	Richard Alatorre (D)	Richard Polanco (D)
56	May 12, 1987	Gloria Molina (D)	Lucille Roybal-Allard (D)
16	April 12, 1988	Art Agnos (D)	John Burton (D)
50	February 7, 1989	Curtis R. Tucker (D)	Curtis R. Tucker Jr. (D)
76	October 3, 1989	Bill Bradley (R)	Tricia Hunter (R)
27	January 30, 1990	Gary Condit (D)	Sal Cannella (D)
78	June 5, 1990	Lucy Killea (D)	Jeff Marston (R)
26	May 14, 1991	Patrick Johnston (D)	Dean Andal (R)
46	July 30, 1991	Mike Roos (D)	Barbara Friedman (D)
5	September 17, 1991	Tim Leslie (R)	B. T. Collins (R)
67	September 17, 1991	John Lewis (R)	Mickey Conroy (R)
31	February 21, 1993	Bruce Bronzan (D)	Cruz Bustamante (D)
5	July 27, 1993	B. T. Collins (R)	Barbara Alby (R)
27	November 2, 1993	Sam Farr (D)	Bruce McPherson (R)
79	April 12, 1994	Steve Peace (D)	Denise Moreno Ducheny (D)
43	May 3, 1994	Pat Nolan (R)	Jim Rogan (R)
60	May 16, 1995	Paul Horcher (R)	Gary Miller (R)
59	June 6, 1995	Dick Mountjoy (R)	Bob Margett (R)
72	September 12, 1995	Ross Johnson (R)	Dick Ackerman (R)
67	November 28, 1995	Doris Allen (R)	Scott Baugh (R)
13	March 26, 1996	Willie Brown (D)	Carole Migden (D)
46	January 13, 1998	Louis Caldera (D)	Gil Cedillo (D)
16	March 30, 1999	Don Perata (D)	Audie Bock (G)
49	April 3, 2001	Gloria Romero (D)	Judy Chu (D)
65	April 3, 2001	Brett Granlund (R) / Jan Leja (R) (Note: Granlund represented the district 1994 – 2000. Leja won the election to succees Granlund (who was termed out), but did not take the seat as part of a plea agreement with the office of the California Attorney General who charged her with campaign financing violations.)	Russ Bogh (R)
53	September 13, 2005	Mike Gordon (D)	Ted Lieu (D)
39	May 15, 2007	Richard Alarcón (D)	Felipe Fuentes (D)
55	February 5, 2008	Laura Richardson (D)	Warren Furutani (D)
51	September 1, 2009	Curren Price (D)	Steven Bradford (D)
72	January 12, 2010	Michael Duvall (R)	Chris Norby (R)
43	June 8, 2010	Paul Krekorian (D)	Mike Gatto (D)
4	May 3, 2011	Ted Gaines (R)	Beth Gaines (R)
80	May 21, 2013	Ben Hueso (D)	Lorena Gonzalez (D)
52	July 23, 2013	Norma Torres (D)	Freddie Rodriguez (D)
45	November 19, 2013	Bob Blumenfield (D)	Matt Dababneh (D)
54	December 3, 2013	Holly Mitchell (D)	Sebastian Ridley-Thomas (D)
31	April 5, 2016	Henry Perea (D)	Joaquin Arambula (D)
51	December 5, 2017	Jimmy Gomez (D)	Wendy Carrillo (D)
54	April 3, 2018	Sebastian Ridley-Thomas (D)	Sydney Kamlager (D)
39	June 5, 2018	Raul Bocanegra (D)	Luz Rivas (D)
45	June 5, 2018	Matt Dababneh (D)	Jesse Gabriel (D)
1	November 5, 2019	Brian Dahle (R)	Megan Dahle (R)
79	April 6, 2021	Shirley Weber (D)	Akilah Weber (D)
54	May 18, 2021	Sydney Kamlager (D)	Isaac Bryan (D)
18	August 31, 2021	Rob Bonta (D)	Mia Bonta (D)
49	February 15, 2022	Ed Chau (D)	Mike Fong (D)
11	April 5, 2022	Jim Frazier (D)	Lori Wilson (D)
17	April 19, 2022	David Chiu (D)	Matt Haney (D)
62	June 7, 2022	Autumn Burke (D)	Tina McKinnor (D)
80	June 7, 2022	Lorena Gonzalez (D)	David Alvarez (D)
32	February 25, 2025	Vince Fong (R) (Note: At the start of the session, the seat was vacant. Fong was the last person to represent the district, and resigned in the previous session)	Stan Ellis (R)
63	August 26, 2025	Bill Essayli (R)	Natasha Johnson

=== List of recall elections ===
A replacement assemblymember is only listed in cases in which the recall was successful.

District	Date	Recall target	Replacement
60	May 16, 1995	Paul Horcher (I)	Gary Miller (R)
17	August 22, 1995	Michael Machado (D)	Not applicable, recall failed
67	November 28, 1995	Doris Allen (R)	Scott Baugh (R)

== Results ==
=== 53rd district special election, 2005 ===

53rd State Assembly district special election, 2005
Party	Candidate	Votes	%
Democratic	Ted Lieu	25,285	59.94
Republican	Mary Ford	8,108	19.22
Republican	Paul Nowatka	4,928	11.68
Republican	Greg Hill	2,109	5.00
Republican	Paul Whitehead	912	2.16
Peace and Freedom	James Smith	843	2.00
Valid ballots		42,185	99.49
Invalid or blank votes		216	0.51
Total votes		42,401	100.00
Turnout			17.69
Democratic hold			

=== 39th district special election, 2007 ===

California's 39th State Assembly district special election, 2007
Party	Candidate	Votes	%
Democratic	Felipe Fuentes	5,819	50.82
Republican	Jose Bonilla	2,277	19.89
Democratic	Felipe Siordia	1,457	12.72
Democratic	Eric Rothenay	1,300	11.35
Democratic	Margie Carranza	597	5.21
Valid ballots		11,450	99.29
Invalid or blank votes		82	0.71
Total votes		11,532	100.00
Turnout			10.24
Democratic hold			

=== 55th district special election, 2008 ===

California's 55th State Assembly district special election, 2008
Party	Candidate	Votes	%
Democratic	Warren Furutani	48,419	69.80
American Independent	Charlotte Gibson	10,785	15.55
Libertarian	Herb Peters	10,168	14.66
Valid ballots		69,372	79.80
Invalid or blank votes		17,670	20.30
Total votes		87,042	100.00
Turnout			50.96
Democratic hold			

=== 51st district special election, 2009 ===

California's 51st State Assembly district special election, 2009
Party	Candidate	Votes	%
Democratic	Steven Bradford	7,580	52.89
Democratic	Gloria Gray	2,794	19.50
Republican	David Coffin	2,418	16.87
Democratic	Robert Pullen-Miles	702	4.90
Democratic	Thomas Cares	664	4.63
Democratic	Mervin Evans	173	1.21
Total votes		14,331	100.00
Turnout			7.90
Democratic hold			

=== 72nd district special election, 2010 ===

California's 72nd State Assembly district special election, 2010
Party	Candidate	Votes	%
Republican	Chris Norby	21,406	62.72
Democratic	John MacMurray	10,622	31.12
Green	Jane Rands	2,100	6.15
Total votes		34,128	100.00
Turnout			15.59
Republican hold			

=== 43rd district special election, 2010 ===

California's 43rd State Assembly district special election, 2010
Party	Candidate	Votes	%
Democratic	Mike Gatto	23,733	58.58
Republican	Sunder Ramani	16,778	41.42
Total votes		40,511	100.00
Turnout			20.14
Democratic hold			

=== 4th district special election, 2011 ===
California's 4th State Assembly district special election, 2011
Party	Candidate	Votes	%
Republican	Beth Gaines	41,144	55.58
Democratic	Dennis Campanale	32,878	44.42
Total votes		74,022	100.00
Turnout			25.68
Republican hold			

=== 80th district special election, 2013 ===

California's 80th State Assembly district special election, 2013 Vacancy resulting from the resignation of Ben Hueso
Primary election
Party	Candidate	Votes	%
Democratic	Lorena Gonzalez	18,125	71.2
Democratic	Steve Castaneda	6,646	26.1
Libertarian	Kaiden Degas (write-in)	548	2.2
Republican	Lincoln Pickard (write-in)	140	0.5
Total votes		25,459	100.0
Democratic hold			

=== 52nd district special election, 2013 ===

California's 52nd State Assembly district special election, 2013 Vacancy resulting from the resignation of Norma Torres
Primary election
Party	Candidate	Votes	%
No party preference	Paul S. Leon	4,219	24.9
Democratic	Freddie Rodriguez	3,758	22.2
Republican	Dorothy F. Pineda	2,453	14.5
Democratic	Jason A. Rothman	1,545	9.1
Democratic	Tom Haughey	1,482	8.7
Democratic	Danielle Soto	1,259	7.4
Democratic	Doris Louise Wallace	887	5.2
Democratic	Paul Vincent Avila	752	4.4
Democratic	Manuel Saucedo	597	3.5
Total votes		16,952	100.0
General election
Democratic	Freddie Rodriguez	7,630	51.3
No party preference	Paul S. Leon	7,230	48.7
Total votes		14,860	100.0
Democratic hold			

=== 45th district special election, 2013 ===

California's 45th State Assembly district special election, 2013 Vacancy resulting from the resignation of Bob Blumenfield
Primary election
Party	Candidate	Votes	%
Democratic	Matt Dababneh	6,088	24.7
Republican	Susan Shelley	5,205	21.1
Democratic	Jeff Ebenstein	3,407	13.8
Republican	Chris Kolski	3,141	12.7
Democratic	Andra Hoffman	2,477	10.0
Democratic	Damian Carroll	1,680	6.8
Democratic	Elizabeth Badger	679	2.8
Democratic	Dennis De Young	673	2.7
Republican	Armineh Chelebian	624	2.5
No party preference	Eric Lewis	432	1.8
Democratic	Dan McCrory	262	1.1
Total votes		24,668	100.0
General election
Democratic	Matt Dababneh	14,984	50.6
Republican	Susan Shelley	14,655	49.4
Total votes		29,639	100.0
Democratic hold			

=== 54th district special election, 2013 ===

California's 54th State Assembly district special election, 2013 Vacancy resulting from the resignation of Holly Mitchell
Primary election
Party	Candidate	Votes	%
Democratic	Sebastian Ridley-Thomas	13,992	60.2
Democratic	Christopher R. Armenta	8,270	35.6
Democratic	John Jake	931	4.0
No party preference	Morry Waksberg (write-in)	31	0.1
Total votes		23,224	100.0
Democratic hold			

=== 31st district special election, 2016 ===

California's 31st State Assembly district special election, 2016 Vacancy resulting from the resignation of Henry Perea
Primary election
Party	Candidate	Votes	%
Democratic	Joaquin Arambula	19,621	53.8
Republican	Clint Olivier	14,708	40.3
Democratic	Ted Miller	2,152	5.9
Total votes		36,481	100.0
Democratic hold			

=== 51st district special election, 2017 ===

California's 51st State Assembly district special election, 2017 Vacancy resulting from the resignation of Jimmy Gomez
Primary election
Party	Candidate	Votes	%
Democratic	Wendy Carrillo	5,058	22.2
Democratic	Luis López	4,243	18.6
Democratic	Mike Fong	3,675	16.1
Democratic	Gabriel Sandoval	2,370	10.4
Democratic	Ron Birnbaum	2,213	9.7
Democratic	Alex De Ocampo	1,803	7.9
Democratic	David Vela	1,075	4.7
Democratic	Mark Vargas	1,022	4.5
Libertarian	Andrew S. Aguero	405	1.8
No party preference	Patrick Koppula	328	1.4
Democratic	Barbara Torres	284	1.2
Peace and Freedom	John Prysner	232	1.0
Democratic	Mario Olmos	122	0.5
Total votes		22,830	100.0
General election
Democratic	Wendy Carrillo	11,100	53.5
Democratic	Luis López	9,631	46.5
Total votes		20,731	100.0
Democratic hold			

=== 54th district special election, 2018 ===

California's 54th State Assembly district special election, 2018 Vacancy resulting from the resignation of Sebastian Ridley-Thomas
Primary election
Party	Candidate	Votes	%
Democratic	Sydney Kamlager	22,605	69.0
Democratic	Tepring Michelle Piquado	4,673	14.3
Republican	Glen Ratcliff	3,826	11.7
Democratic	Grayson A. Pangilinan	1,182	3.6
Democratic	Steve Dunwoody (write-in)	495	1.5
Total votes		32,781	100.0
Democratic hold			

=== 39th district special election, 2018 ===

California's 39th State Assembly district special election, 2018 Vacancy resulting from the resignation of Raul Bocanegra
Primary election
Party	Candidate	Votes	%
Democratic	Luz Rivas	8,222	42.9
Republican	Ricardo Antonio Benitez	3,862	20.1
Democratic	Antonio Sanchez	3,802	19.8
Democratic	Patty López	1,907	9.9
Democratic	Yolie Anguiano	922	4.8
Democratic	Patrea Patrick	467	2.4
Total votes		19,182	100.0
General election
Democratic	Luz Rivas	31,851	70.8
Republican	Ricardo Antonio Benitez	13,165	29.2
Total votes		45,016	100.0
Democratic hold			

=== 45th district special election, 2018 ===

California's 45th State Assembly district special election, 2018 Vacancy resulting from the resignation of Matt Dababneh
Primary election
Party	Candidate	Votes	%
Democratic	Jesse Gabriel	10,632	32.7
Republican	Justin M. Clark	8,172	25.1
Democratic	Tricia Robbins Kasson	5,507	16.9
Democratic	Ankur Patel	3,698	11.4
No party preference	Dennis Zine	2,491	7.7
Democratic	David Brin	752	2.3
Democratic	Raymond J. Bishop	685	2.1
Democratic	Jeff Bornstein	590	1.8
Democratic	C.R. Cochrane (write-in)	7	0.0
Total votes		32,534	100.0
General election
Democratic	Jesse Gabriel	46,168	65.7
Republican	Justin M. Clark	24,109	34.3
Total votes		70,277	100.0
Democratic hold			

=== 1st district special election, 2019 ===

California's 1st State Assembly district special election, 2019 Vacancy resulting from the resignation of Brian Dahle
Primary election
Party	Candidate	Votes	%
Democratic	Elizabeth Betancourt	27,786	39.1
Republican	Megan Dahle	25,669	36.2
Republican	Patrick Henry Jones	12,298	17.3
Republican	Joe Turner	3,943	5.6
Republican	Lane Rickard	1,305	1.8
Total votes		71,001	100.0
General election
Republican	Megan Dahle	59,991	57.3
Democratic	Elizabeth Betancourt	44,618	42.7
Total votes		104,609	100.0
Republican hold			

=== 79th district special election, 2021 ===

California's 79th State Assembly district special election, 2021 Vacancy resulting from the resignation of Shirley Weber
Primary election
Party	Candidate	Votes	%
Democratic	Akilah Weber	33,197	52.0
Republican	Marco Contreras	21,359	33.4
Democratic	Leticia Munguia	5,263	8.2
Democratic	Shane Suzanne Parmely	3,241	5.1
Democratic	Aeiramique Glass Blake	818	1.3
Total votes		63,878	100.0
Democratic hold			

=== 54th district special election, 2021 ===

California's 54th State Assembly district special election, 2021 Vacancy resulting from the resignation of Sydney Kamlager
Primary election
Party	Candidate	Votes	%
Democratic	Isaac Bryan	21,472	50.8
Democratic	Heather Hutt	10,538	24.9
Democratic	Cheryl C. Turner	4,072	9.6
Democratic	Dallas Fowler	3,235	7.6
No party preference	Bernard Senter	1,667	3.9
Democratic	Samuel Robert Morales	1,304	3.1
Total votes		42,288	100.0
Democratic hold			

=== 18th district special election, 2021 ===
2021 California's 10th State Assembly district special election
- August 31, 2021

California's 18th State Assembly district
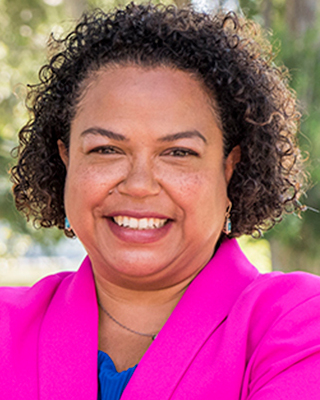

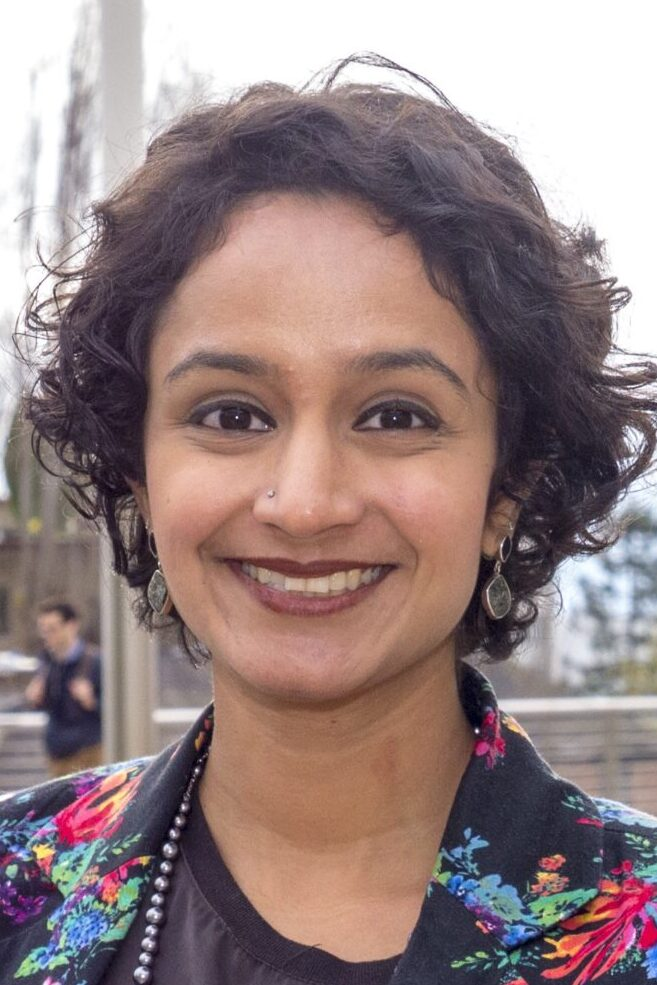
Candidate	Mia Bonta	Janani Ramachandran
Party	Democratic	Democratic
Popular vote	43,460	33,012
Percentage	56.8%	43.2%
Assemblymember before election
Rob Bonta
Democratic
Elected Assemblymember
Mia Bonta
Democratic

California's 18th State Assembly district special election, 2021 Vacancy resulting from the resignation of Rob Bonta
Primary election
Party	Candidate	Votes	%
Democratic	Mia Bonta	22,558	38.2
Democratic	Janani Ramachandran	14,036	23.7
Democratic	Malia Vella	10,053	17.0
Republican	Stephen Slauson	5,725	9.7
Democratic	Victor Aguilar	3,938	6.7
Democratic	James Aguilar	1,039	1.8
Democratic	Eugene Canson	1,029	1.7
No party preference	Joel Britton	750	1.3
Total votes		59,128	100.0
General election
Democratic	Mia Bonta	43,762	56.9
Democratic	Janani Ramachandran	33,181	43.1
Total votes		76,943	100.0
Democratic hold			

=== 49th district special election, 2022 ===

California's 49th State Assembly district special election, 2022 Vacancy resulting from the resignation of Ed Chau
Primary election
Party	Candidate	Votes	%
Democratic	Mike Fong	27,763	67.0
Republican	Burton Brink	13,703	33.0
Total votes		41,466	100.0
Democratic hold			

=== 17th district special election, 2022 ===
2022 California's 17th State Assembly district special election
- April 19, 2022

California's 17th State Assembly district
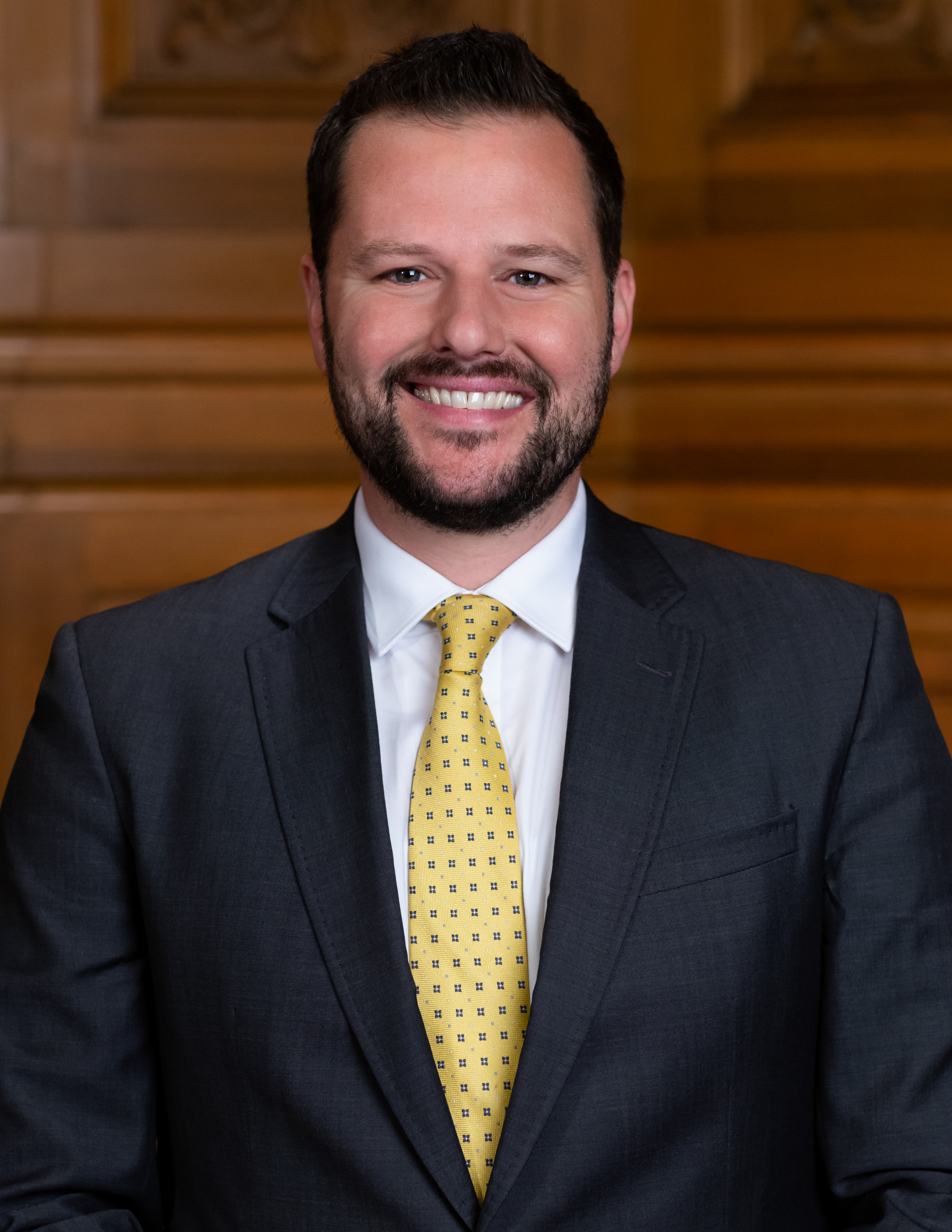

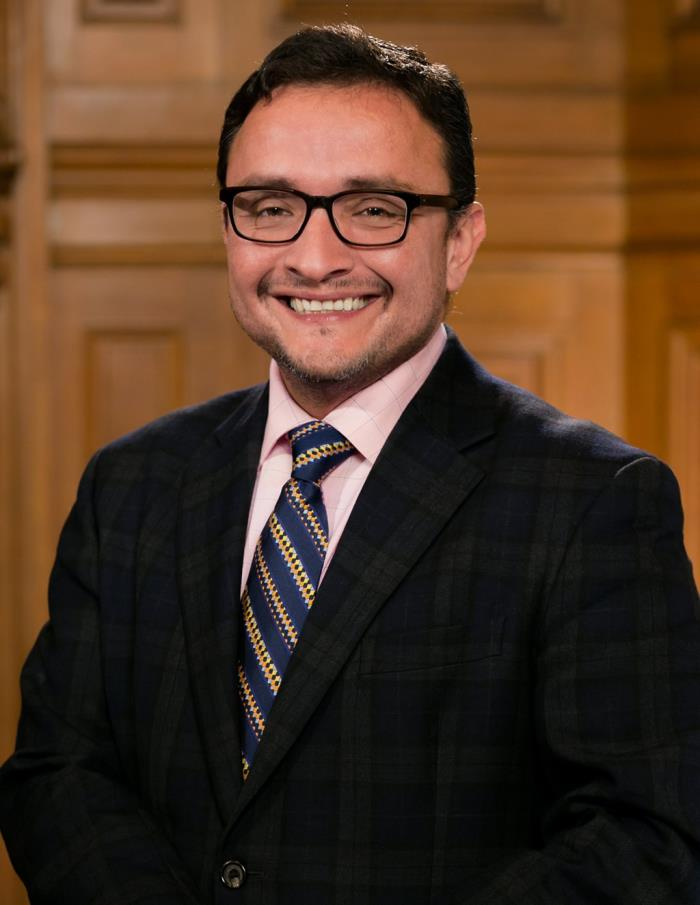
Candidate	Matt Haney	David Campos
Party	Democratic	Democratic
Popular vote	48,762	29,422
Percentage	62.4%	37.6%
Assemblymember before election
David Chiu
Democratic
Elected Assemblymember
Matt Haney
Democratic

California's 17th State Assembly district special election, 2022 Vacancy resulting from the resignation of David Chiu
Primary election
Party	Candidate	Votes	%
Democratic	Matt Haney	34,174	36.4
Democratic	David Campos	33,448	35.7
Democratic	Bilal Mahmood	20,895	22.3
Democratic	Thea Selby	5,261	5.6
Total votes		93,778	100.0
General election
Democratic	Matt Haney	48,762	62.4
Democratic	David Campos	29,422	37.6
Total votes		78,184	100.0
Democratic hold			

=== 11th district special election, 2022 ===
2022 California's 11th State Assembly district special election
- April 5, 2022

California's 11th State Assembly district
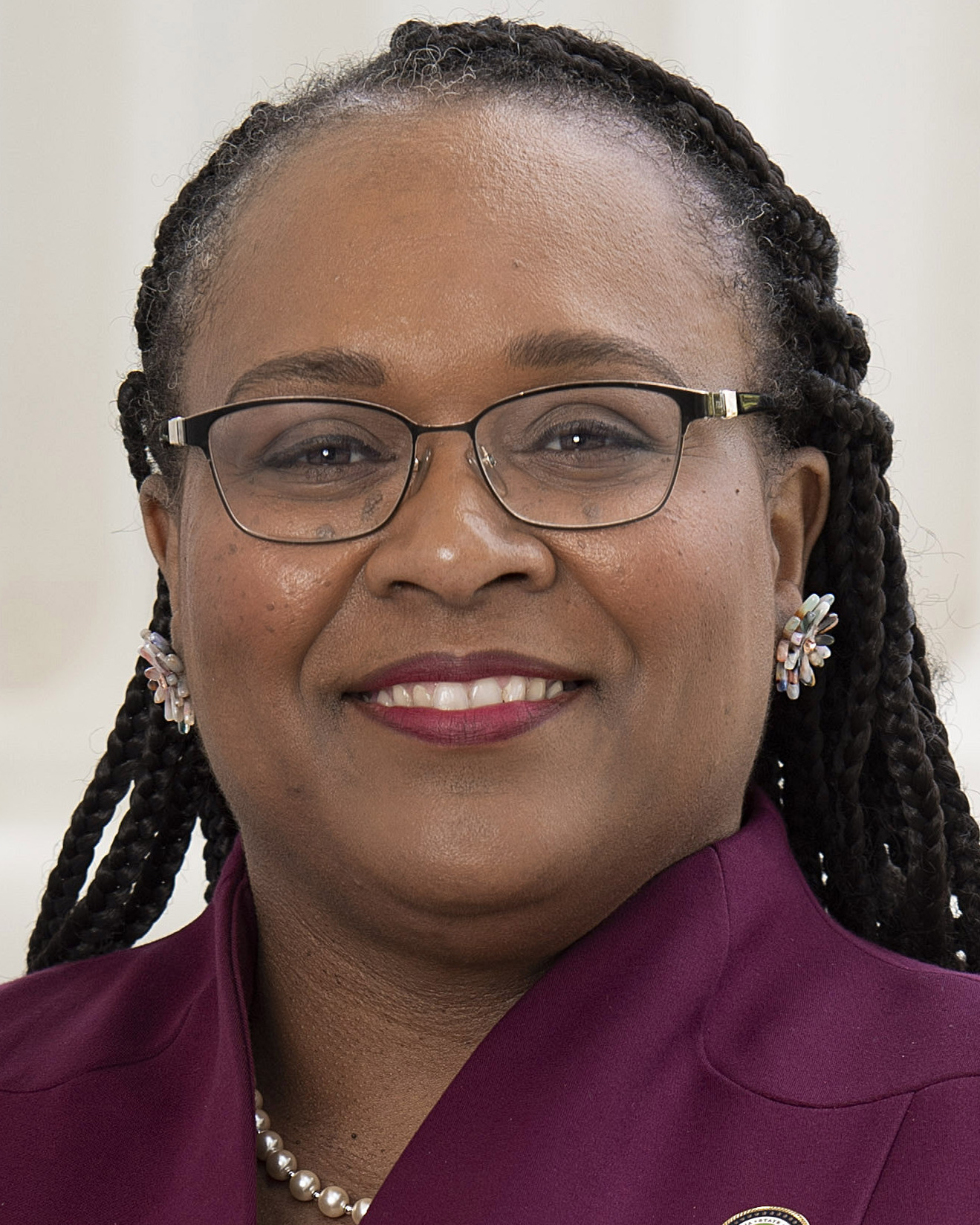

Candidate	Lori Wilson	Erik Elness (write-in)
Party	Democratic	Republican
Popular vote	30,243	1,975
Percentage	93.9%	6.1%
Assemblymember before election
Jim Frazier
Democratic
Elected Assemblymember
Lori Wilson
Democratic

California's 11th State Assembly district special election, 2022 Vacancy resulting from the resignation of Jim Frazier
Primary election
Party	Candidate	Votes	%
Democratic	Lori Wilson	30,243	93.9
Republican	Erik Elness (write-in)	1,975	6.1
Total votes		32,218	100.0
Democratic hold			

=== 62nd district special election, 2022 ===
2022 California's 62nd State Assembly district special election
- June 7, 2022
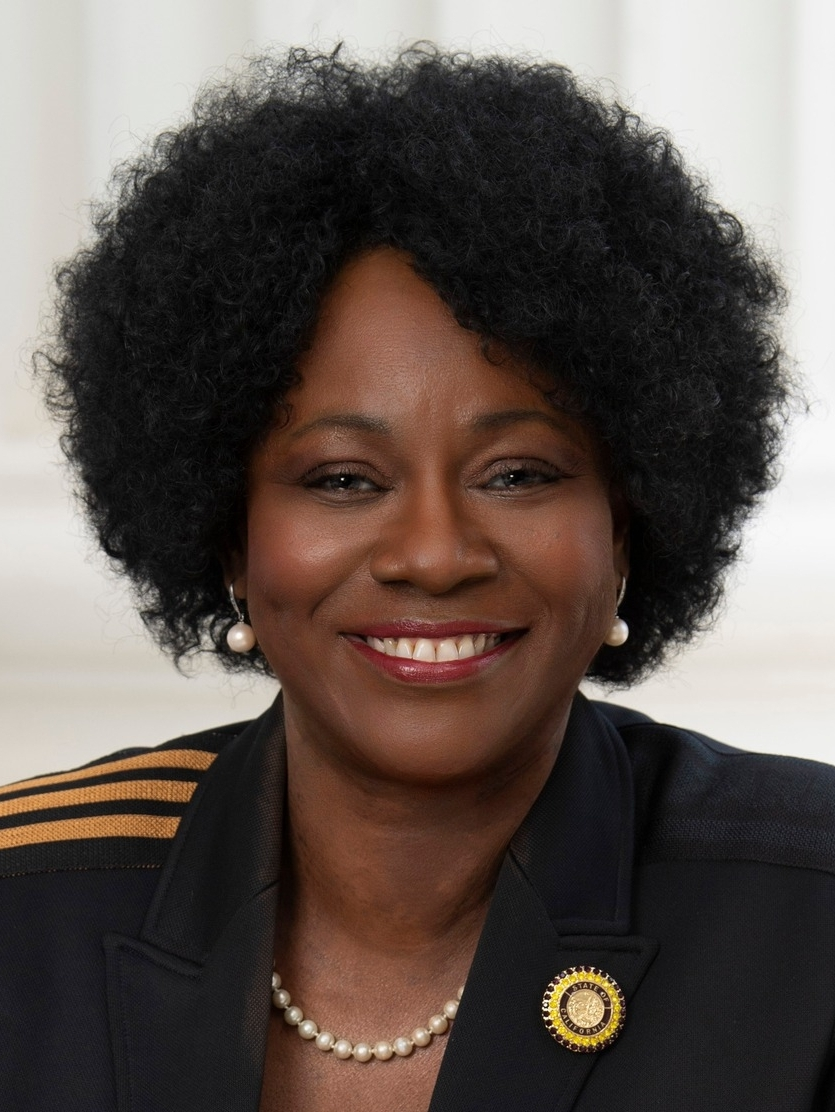

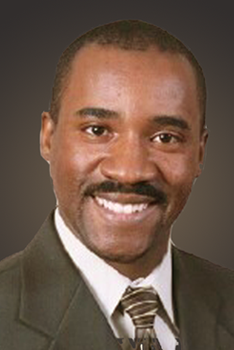
Nominee	Tina McKinnor	Robert Pullen-Miles
Party	Democratic	Democratic
Popular vote	31,222	28,246
Percentage	52.5%	47.5%
Assemblymember before election
Autumn Burke
Democratic
Elected Assemblymember
Tina McKinnor
Democratic

California's 62nd State Assembly district special election, 2022 Vacancy resulting from the resignation of Autumn Burke
Primary election
Party	Candidate	Votes	%
Democratic	Robert Pullen-Miles	11,213	39.0
Democratic	Tina McKinnor	9,945	34.6
Democratic	Angie Reyes English	3,794	13.2
Democratic	Nico Ruderman	3,777	13.1
Total votes		28,729	100.0
General election
Democratic	Tina McKinnor	31,348	52.5
Democratic	Robert Pullen-Miles	28,359	47.5
Total votes		59,707	100.0
Democratic hold			

=== 80th district special election, 2022 ===
2022 California's 80th State Assembly district special election
- June 7, 2022
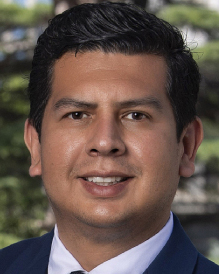

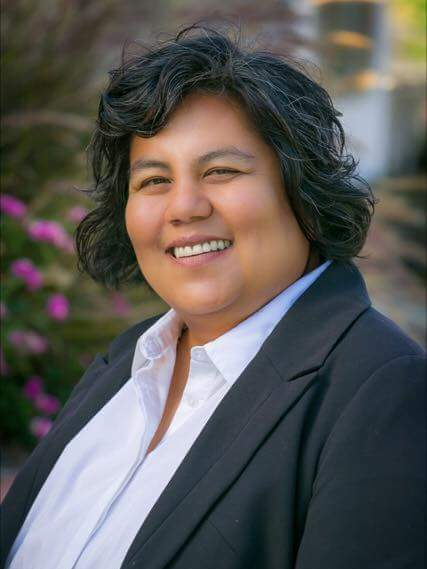
Nominee	David Alvarez	Georgette Gómez
Party	Democratic	Democratic
Popular vote	26,482	22,297
Percentage	54.3%	45.7%
Assemblymember before election
Lorena Gonzalez
Democratic
Elected Assemblymember
David Alvarez
Democratic

California's 80th State Assembly district special election, 2025 Vacancy resulting from the resignation of Lorena Gonzalez
Primary election
Party	Candidate	Votes	%
Democratic	Georgette Gómez	15,300	38.2
Democratic	David Alvarez	15,132	37.8
Republican	Lincoln Pickard	9,625	24.0
Total votes		40,353	100.0
General election
Democratic	David Alvarez	26,482	54.3
Democratic	Georgette Gómez	22,297	45.7
Total votes		48,779	100.0
Democratic hold			

=== 32nd district special election, 2025 ===
California's 32nd State Assembly district special election Vacancy resulting from Vince Fong's refusal to take the seat after winning reelection
Primary election
Party	Candidate	Votes	%
Republican	Stan Ellis	39,410	64.6
Democratic	Chris Cruz-Boone	17,474	28.7
Republican	Holli Willibey	2,665	4.4
Libertarian	William Brown Jr.	1,427	2.3
Total votes		60,976	100.0
Republican hold			

=== 63rd district special election, 2025 ===
California's 63rd State Assembly district special election, 2025 Vacancy resulting from the resignation of Bill Essayli
Primary election
Party	Candidate	Votes	%
Republican	Natasha Johnson	26,735	46.2
Democratic	Chris Shoults	25,557	44.1
Republican	Vincent Romo	4,881	8.4
Libertarian	Zachary T. Consalvo	756	1.3
American Independent	Maricar Payad (write-in)	1	0.0
Total votes		57,930	100.0
General election
Republican	Natasha Johnson	34,866	53.5
Democratic	Chris Shoults	30,332	46.5
Total votes		65,198	100.0
Republican hold			
