= California's 51st district =

California's 51st district may refer to:

- California's 51st congressional district
- California's 51st State Assembly district
