= California's 52nd district =

California's 52nd district may refer to:

- California's 52nd congressional district
- California's 52nd State Assembly district
