= William Campbell (California politician) =

American politician (1935–2015)

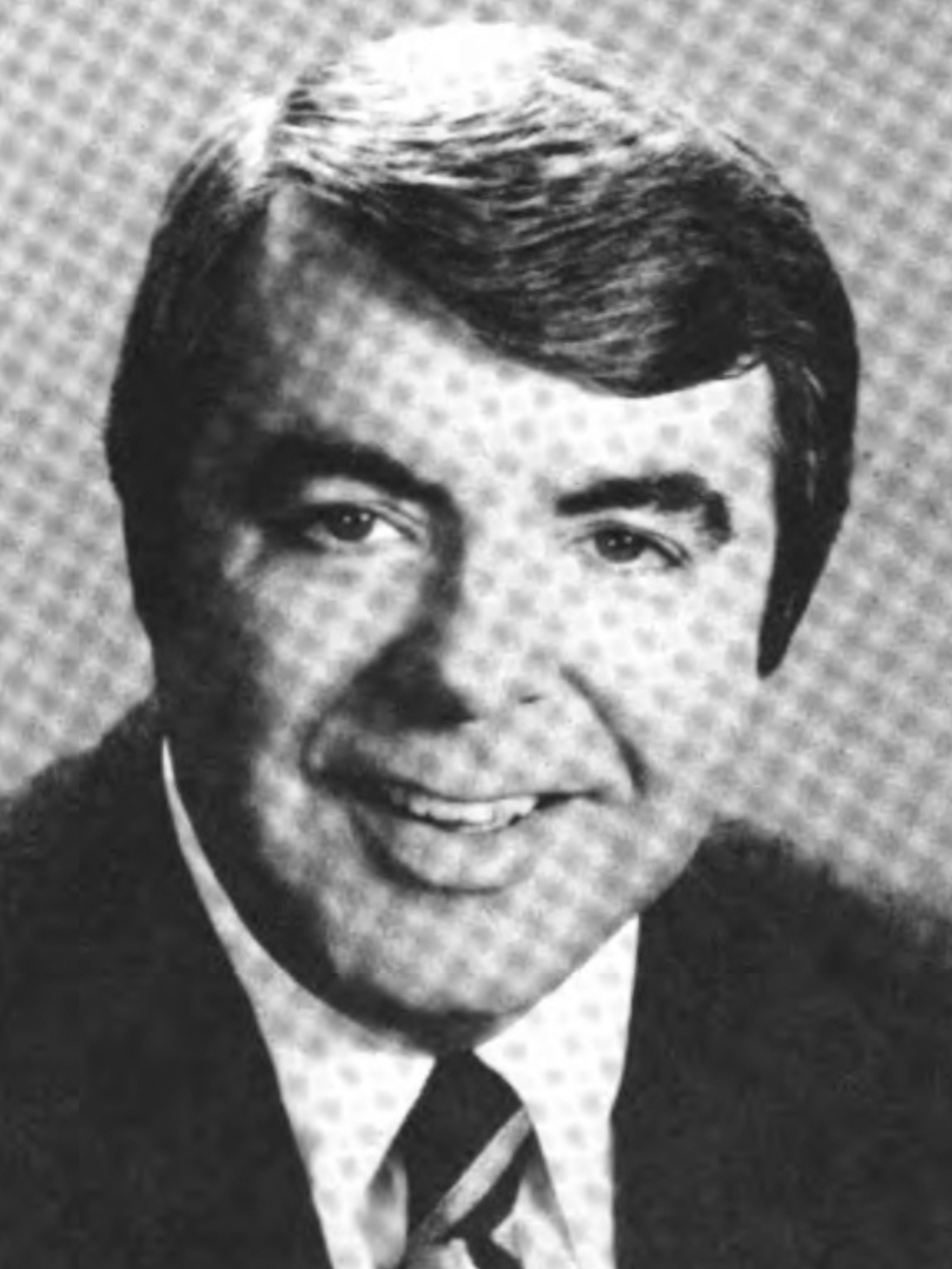
- Official portrait, 1975

Member of the California State Senate
- In office December 6, 1976 – December 15, 1989
- Preceded by: Joseph M. Kennick
- Succeeded by: Frank Hill
- Constituency: 33rd district (1976–1984); 31st district (1984–1989)

Member of the California State Assembly
- In office January 2, 1967 – November 30, 1976
- Preceded by: Philip L. Soto
- Succeeded by: David Stirling
- Constituency: 50th district (1967–1973); 64th district (1974–1976)

Personal details
- Born: July 24, 1935 Coraopolis, Pennsylvania
- Died: March 21, 2015 (aged 79) Orem, Utah
- Party: Republican
- Spouse: Margene Taylor
- Children: 3
- Education: Westminster College; Columbia University

Military service
- Branch/service: United States Army

William Paul Campbell (July 24, 1935 – March 22, 2015) was an American politician and businessman.

Born in Coraopolis, Pennsylvania, Campbell served in the United States Army. He went to Westminster College and Columbia University. In 1959, he moved to California and was an administrative aide for an elementary school district. Campbell lived in Hacienda Heights, California. He served in the California State Assembly from 1966 to 1974 and was a Republican. Campbell then served in the California State Senate from 1976 to 1989 and was Senate Republican Leader from 1979 to 1983. He then became president of the California Manufacturers & Technology Assn. Campbell later moved to Orem, Utah, where he lived for the rest of his life.

Campbell was a Latter-day Saint and got married in the Los Angeles California Temple.
