= California State Assembly districts =

American state legislative districts

California's State Assembly districts are numbered 1st through 80th, generally in north-to-south order.

The California State Assembly is the lower house of the California State Legislature. The Assembly has 80 members, each representing one district.

In accordance with the Article XXI of the California Constitution, assembly district boundaries are redrawn every ten years based on data from the United States Census. The current boundaries were drawn in 2020 by a California Citizens Redistricting Commission and finalized in 2021. The census enumerated population of each district was within 1% of 465,674 with an average absolute deviation of 0.506%.

Due to the state's large population and relatively small legislature, the Assembly has the largest population per representative ratio of any lower house legislature in the United States; only the federal U.S. House of Representatives has a larger ratio. Since Proposition 28 passed in 2012, members of the Legislature are limited to a total of 12 years of legislative service, which can be served in the Assembly, Senate, or a combination of both.

The Democratic State Central Committee, the governing body of the California Democratic Party, elects roughly 1/3 of its members from Assembly district election meetings held biennially in January in every odd-numbered year within each of the 80 Assembly districts.

== List ==
- 1st - Lassen, Modoc, Nevada, Plumas, Shasta, Sierra, and Siskiyou counties, and portions of Butte and Placer counties
- 2nd - Del Norte, Humboldt, Trinity, and Mendocino counties, and portions of Sonoma county
- 3rd - Glenn, Sutter, Tehama, and Yuba counties, and portions of Butte and Colusa counties
- 4th - Lake and Napa counties, and portions of Yolo, Colusa, Sonoma, and Solano counties
- 5th - Madera, Amador, Tuolumne, Calaveras, Mariposa, Mono, and Alpine counties, and portions of El Dorado and Placer counties
- 6th - portions of El Dorado, Placer, and Sacramento counties
- 7th - portions of western Sacramento and eastern Yolo counties
- 8th - portions of eastern Sacramento county
- 9th - portions of southern Sacramento and northern San Joaquin counties
- 10th - Marin county and portions of Sonoma county
- 11th - portions of southern Solano, eastern Contra Costa, and southwestern Sacramento counties
- 12th - portions of San Joaquin and Stanislaus counties
- 13th - portions of western San Joaquin county
- 14th - portions of Contra Costa and western Solano county
- 15th - portions of northern Alameda and western Contra Costa counties
- 16th - portions of eastern Alameda and central Contra Costa counties
- 17th - portions of San Francisco
- 18th - cities of Alameda, San Leandro, and most of Oakland in Alameda county
- 19th - portions of San Francisco and northern San Mateo county
- 20th - portions of central and southern Alameda county
- 21st - Merced county and portions of Stanislaus county
- 22nd - portions of San Mateo county
- 23rd - portions of western Santa Clara county
- 24th - portions of southern San Mateo and western Santa Clara counties
- 25th - portions of southern Alameda and northeastern Santa Clara counties
- 26th - portion of northwestern Santa Clara county
- 27th - downtown and eastern San Jose
- 28th - northern Santa Cruz county and portions of western Santa Clara county
- 29th - portions of northern Monterey, central Santa Cruz, and southwestern Santa Clara counties
- 30th - San Benito county, and portions of Monterey, southern Santa Cruz, and southern Santa Clara counties
- 31st - portions of western Fresno county
- 32nd - Kings county and portions of western Kern county
- 33rd - rural portions of San Bernardino county (Victorville, Barstow and Needles)
- 34th - portions of Kern county
- 35th - San Luis Obispo and portions of northern Santa Barbara county
- 36th - portions of eastern Kern, northern Los Angeles, and western San Bernardino counties
- 37th - portions of eastern Santa Barbara and western Ventura counties
- 38th - portions of northern Los Angeles and eastern Ventura counties
- 39th - northern Los Angeles and San Fernando
- 40th - suburban San Bernardino County (Rancho Cucamonga, Highland, and Redlands)
- 41st - San Gabriel Mountain communities in Los Angeles and San Bernardino counties (Pasadena, San Dimas, and Upland)
- 42nd - portions of rural San Bernardino and Riverside Counties (Yucaipa, San Jacinto, and Palm Desert)
- 43rd - parts of Los Angeles County (Burbank, Glendale, and parts of Los Angeles)
- 44th - coastal Ventura County with a small portion of Los Angeles County (Thousand Oaks, Camarillo and Oxnard)
- 45th - Bell Canyon and parts of Los Angeles (Encino, Northridge, and Woodland Hills)
- 46th - parts of Los Angeles (Panorama City, Sherman Oaks, and Van Nuys)
- 47th - urban San Bernardino County (San Bernardino, Rialto, and Fontana)
- 48th - eastern San Gabriel Valley (Azusa, Glendora, Covina and West Covina)
- 49th - western San Gabriel Valley (Alhambra, Arcadia, San Gabriel and Temple City)
- 50th - western Los Angeles County (Malibu, Santa Monica, and Beverly Hills)
- 51st - western Los Angeles County (Santa Monica, West Hollywood and Hollywood)
- 52nd - central Los Angeles County (Eagle Rock, El Sereno and East Los Angeles)
- 53rd - central Los Angeles County (Downtown Los Angeles, Boyle Heights, Vernon and Montebello)
- 54th - parts of Los Angeles' westside (Crenshaw, UCLA) and Culver City
- 55th - intersection of Los Angeles, Orange, and San Bernardino counties (Brea, La Habra, Yorba Linda)
- 56th - the Imperial Valley and parts of the Coachella Valley and the Colorado Desert (Blythe, Calexico, Coachella)
- 57th - parts of Los Angeles County (Hacienda Heights, Norwalk, Whittier)
- 58th - eastern parts of Riverside and San Bernardino Counties. (parts of Riverside, Corona, and Eastvale, Jurupa Valley, and Grand Terrace )
- 59th - South Los Angeles along Interstate 110 (Florence, University Park, Vermont Square)
- 60th - northwestern corner of Riverside County (Corona, Jurupa Valley, and Norco)
- 61st - central section of the Inland Empire in northwestern Riverside County (Mead Valley, Moreno Valley, Riverside)
- 62nd - part of Los Angeles County centered on Los Angeles International Airport (El Segundo, Inglewood, Venice)
- 63rd - part of the Gateway Cities region southeast of Los Angeles County (Bell, Lakewood, Paramount)
- 64th - parts of south Los Angeles and the South Bay (Carson, Compton, Rancho Dominguez)
- 65th - northern Orange County (Cypress, Fullerton, Stanton)
- 66th - southern coast of Los Angeles County (Hermosa Beach, Torrance, and Ranchos Palos Verdes)
- 67th - southern Inland Empire in western Riverside County (French Valley, Lake Elsinore, Murrieta)
- 68th - inland central Orange County (Irvine, Lake Forest, Orange)
- 69th - heart of Orange County (Anaheim, Orange, Santa Ana)
- 70th - southern coast of Los Angeles County (Long Beach, Los Angeles' San Pedro, and Catalina Island)
- 71st - rural eastern San Diego County and southwest Riverside County (El Cajon and various Kumeyaay Indian Reservations)
- 72nd - Fountain Valley, Garden Grove, Huntington Beach, Los Alamitos, Midway City, Rossmoor, Santa Ana, Seal Beach, Westminster
- 73rd - southern Orange County (Aliso Viejo, Dana Point, Mission Viejo)
- 74th - coastal central Orange County (Costa Mesa, Huntington Beach, Irvine, Laguna Beach, Laguna Woods, Newport Beach)
- 75th - southernmost reaches of the Inland Empire and the inland parts of North County (Escondido, Rainbow, San Marcos)
- 76th - coastal San Diego County (Encinitas, Carlsbad, and Oceanside)
- 77th - inland northern San Diego (Clairemont, Miramar, Poway)
- 78th - southern coastal San Diego County (Del Mar, Imperial Beach) and San Diego's La Jolla neighborhood
- 79th - southeastern San Diego and its closest eastern suburbs
- 80th - southern of San Diego County (Chula Vista and San Diego)

== See also ==
- California State Senate districts
- California Assembly
- Districts in California
