= Frank Hill (American politician) =

American politician (born 1954)

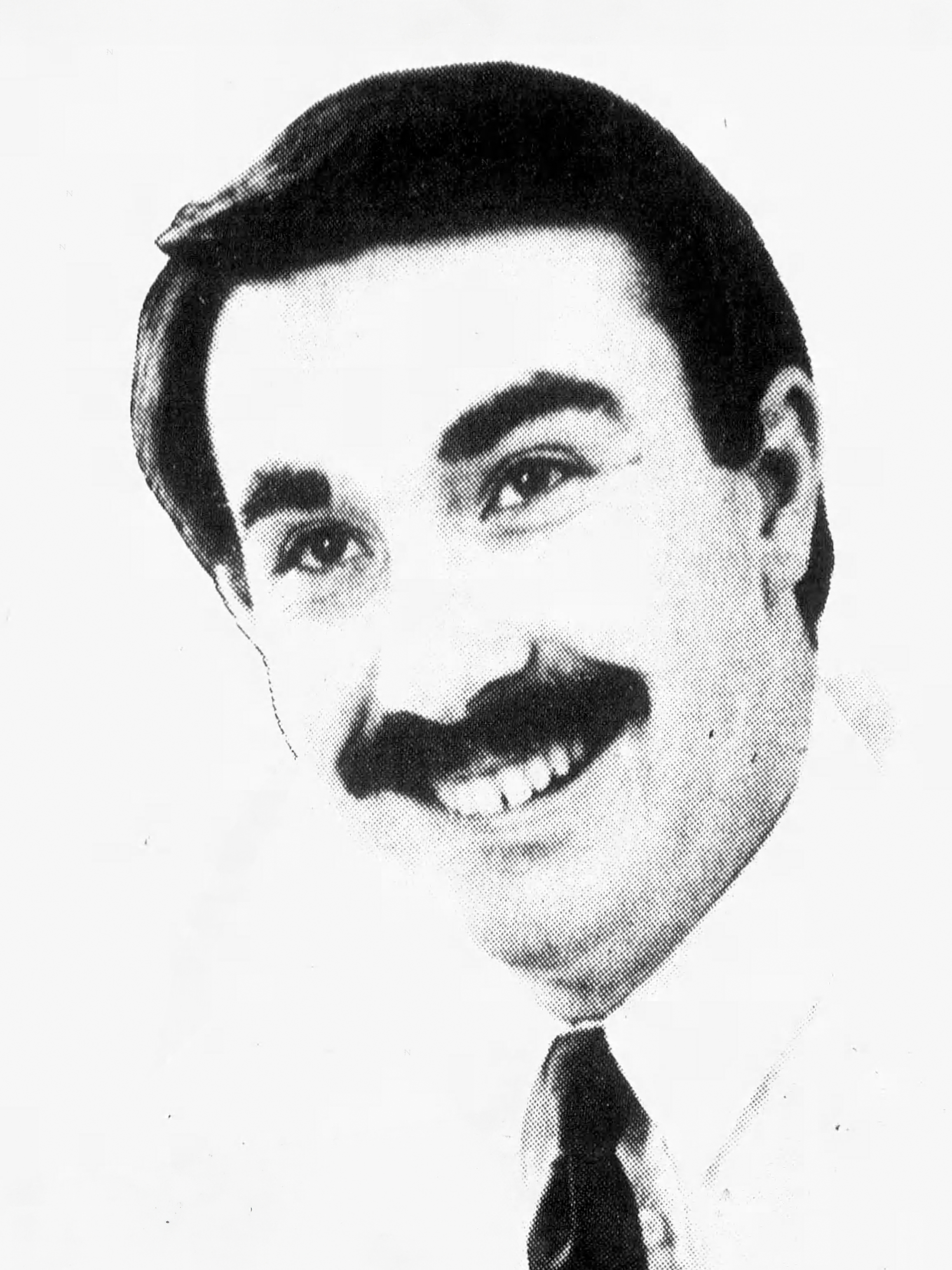
- Hill in 1982

Member of the California State Senate
- In office April 16, 1990 – July 8, 1994
- Preceded by: Bill Campbell
- Succeeded by: Dick Mountjoy
- Constituency: 31st district (1990–1992); 29th district (1992–1994)

Member of the California State Assembly from the 52nd district
- In office December 6, 1982 – April 16, 1990
- Preceded by: Gerald N. Felando
- Succeeded by: Paul Horcher

Personal details
- Born: February 19, 1954 (age 72) El Paso, Texas
- Party: Republican
- Children: 3
- Education: UCLA

Frank C. Hill III (born February 19, 1954) is a former American politician from California and a member of the Republican party. He was convicted of corruption in 1994.

== Political career ==
As a political science graduate fresh out of UCLA, Hill went directly to work as a staffer for Republican S.I. Hayakawa's successful 1976 U.S.Senate campaign. He then worked as a legislative aide to Rep. Wayne Grisham (R-La Mirada).

== State Assembly ==
In 1982 Hill won election to California's 52nd State Assembly district, which was open after reapportionment. He won easy reelection in 1984, 1986 and 1988 in the solidly Republican district based around his hometown of Whittier.

== State Senate ==
In 1990 Hill ran in a special election for the 31st State Senate district left open when Republican Bill Campbell resigned to become President of California Manufacturers Association. In a bitter, hard fought primary Hill narrowly defeated fellow assemblyman Gil Ferguson (R-Newport Beach), Brea councilman Ron Isles and Diamond Bar councilman Gary Miller, then went on to easily hold the heavily Republican seat in the runoff.

The district was redrawn after the 1991 reapportionment and renumbered the 29th. Hill had little trouble holding the seat in 1992, though by then the FBI had already searched his offices (he would be indicted the following year). That, plus the Democratic tilt to the election allowed Democratic candidate Sandy Hester to hold him to 56% of the vote.

== Corruption ==
In 1994, Hill was convicted of taking $2,500 from an undercover FBI agent for help with legislation about a bogus shrimp processing plant dubbed "shrimpgate" and "shrimpscam", in what was part of the BRISPEC sting operation. The conviction resulted in a 4 year prison sentence. The sting also brought down other elected officials: state senators Paul B. Carpenter (D-Cerritos), Alan Robbins (D-Van Nuys), Joseph B. Montoya (D-Whittier) and assemblyman Pat Nolan (R-Glendale). Carpenter had been elected to the State Board of Equalization in 1986.

In August 2020, Hill was served a search warrant and his home in Whittier was raided in connection with a corruption probe into a failed solar project that cost the City of Industry $20 million and left taxpayers with nothing to show for. Hill and three others were charged in September 2021 by Los Angeles County prosecutors as a result of the probe.

== Electoral history ==
Member, California State Assembly: 1982–1990 Member, California State Senate : 1990–1994
Year	Office	Democrat	Votes	Pct	Republican	Votes	Pct
1982	California State Assembly; District 52	Michael A. Reza	31,104	34.1%	Frank Hill	60,101	65.9%
1984	California State Assembly; District 52	Daniel Arguelo	32,189	29.8%	Frank Hill	75,946	70.2%
1986	California State Assembly; District 52	Judith Prather	26,812	30.8%	Frank Hill	60,272	69.2%
1988	California State Assembly; District 52	Terry Lee Perkins	42,468	36.6%	Frank Hill	73,665	63.4%
1990	California State Senate; District 31	Janice Lynn Graham	20,142	35.7%	Gil Ferguson 21.8% Frank Hill 22.6%	34,345	60.9%
1992	California State Senate; District 29	Sandy Hester	116,021	43.8%	Frank Hill	148,754	56.2%

California Assembly
Preceded by Gerald N. Felando	Member of the California State Assembly; 52nd district December 4, 1982 – April 16, 1990	Succeeded by Paul Horcher
California Senate
Preceded by Robert G. Beverly	Member of the California State from the 29th district December 7, 1992 – July 8, 1994	Succeeded by Dick Mountjoy
Preceded by Bill Campbell	Member of the California State from the 31st district April 16, 1990 – November 30, 1992	Succeeded by Bill Leonard
