= William H. Poole (politician) =

American politician

Member of the California State Assembly from the 52nd district
- In office January 6, 1941 – January 4, 1943
- Preceded by: Ben Rosenthal
- Succeeded by: Jonathan J. Hollibaugh

Personal details
- Born: January 2, 1897 Pittsburgh, Pennsylvania
- Died: October 1, 1974 (aged 77) Long Beach, California
- Party: Democratic

Military service
- Branch/service: United States Army
- Battles/wars: World War I

William H. Poole (January 2, 1897 – October 1, 1974) served in the California State Assembly for the 52nd district from 1941 to 1943 and during World War I he served in the United States Army.
