= California's 51st State Assembly district =

American legislative district

Current assemblymember
Rick Zbur; D–Los Angeles
- Demographics: 58.57% White; 4.13% Black; 17.57% Latino; 13.42% Asian; 0.15% Native American; 0.10% Hawaiian/Pacific Islander; 0.87% other; 0.31% remainder of multiracial
- Registered voters: 223,852
- Registration: 60.73% Democratic; 9.13% Republican; 25.88% No party preference

California's 51st State Assembly district is one of 80 California State Assembly districts. It is currently represented by Democrat Rick Zbur of Los Angeles.

== District profile ==
The district encompasses parts of western Los Angeles, as well as the cities of Beverly Hills, Santa Monica, and West Hollywood.

Los Angeles County – 4.95%
- Beverly Hills
- Santa Monica
- West Hollywood
- Los Angeles – 8.57%
  - Cheviot Hills
  - Hollywood
  - East Hollywood
  - Sawtelle
  - West Los Angeles
  - Westwood Village

== Election results from statewide races ==
Year	Office	Results
2021	Recall	No 85.4 – 14.6%
2020	President	Biden 81.4 - 14.6%
2018	Governor	Newsom 85.9 – 14.1%
2018	Senator	de Leon 50.0 – 50.0%
2016	President	Clinton 84.0 – 10.2%
2016	Senator	Harris 55.0 – 45.0%
2014	Governor	Brown 84.3 – 14.7%
2012	President	Obama 83.5 – 13.5%
2012	Senator	Feinstein 85.1 – 14.9%

== List of assembly members representing the district ==
Due to redistricting, the 51st district has been moved around different parts of the state. The current iteration resulted from the 2021 redistricting by the California Citizens Redistricting Commission.

Assembly Members	Party	Years served	Counties represented	Notes
Joseph F. Black (Livermore)	Democratic	January 3, 1885 – January 5, 1887	Alameda	Elected in 1884. [data missing]
Hiram Bailey (Livermore)	Republican	January 5, 1887 – January 7, 1889	Alameda	Elected in 1886. [data missing]
Joseph McKeown (Alameda)	Republican	January 7, 1889 – February 7, 1890	Alameda	Elected in 1888. [data missing]
Frank L. Fowler (Oakland)	Republican	January 5, 1891 – January 2, 1893	Alameda	Elected in 1890. [data missing]
C. G. Dodge (Oakland)	Republican	January 2, 1893 – January 4, 1897	Alameda	Elected in 1892. Re-elected in 1894. [data missing]
Howard E. Wright (Berkeley)	Republican	January 4, 1897 – January 1, 1901	Alameda	Elected in 1896. Re-elected in 1898. [data missing]
Newell K. Foster (Oakland)	Republican	January 1, 1901 – March 16, 1903	Alameda	Elected in 1900. Re-elected in 1902. Resigned.
Vacant		March 16, 1903 – January 2, 1905	Alameda	
R. H. E. Espey (Oakland)	Republican	January 2, 1905 – October 15, 1906	Alameda	Elected in 1904. Announced re-election campaign, then died.
Vacant		October 15, 1906 – January 7, 1907	Alameda	
George J. Hans (Oakland)	Republican	January 7, 1907 – January 2, 1911	Alameda	Elected in 1906. Re-elected in 1908. Retired to become a State Senator.
Frank M. Smith (Oakland)	Republican	January 2, 1911 – January 6, 1913	Alameda	Elected in 1910. Redistricted to the 54th district.
William A. Sutherland (Fresno)	Republican	January 6, 1913 – January 4, 1915	Fresno	Redistricted from the 36th district and re-elected in 1912. [data missing]
Henry Hawson (Fresno)	Democratic	January 4, 1915 – January 6, 1919	Fresno	Elected in 1914. Re-elected in 1916. Retired to run for U.S. House of Representatives.
S. L. Strother (Fresno)	Democratic	January 6, 1919 – January 3, 1921	Fresno	Elected in 1918. [data missing]
Herbert McDowell (Fresno)	Republican	January 3, 1921 – January 3, 1927	Fresno	Elected in 1920. Re-elected in 1922. Re-elected in 1924. [data missing]
Z. S. Leymel (Fresno)	Republican	January 3, 1927 – April 22, 1929	Fresno	Elected in 1926. Re-elected in 1928. Resigned to become Mayor of Fresno.
Vacant		April 22, 1929 – January 5, 1931	Fresno	
Sarah E. Kellogg (Los Angeles)	Republican	January 5, 1931 – January 2, 1933	Los Angeles	Elected in 1930. Lost re-election.
William M. Jones (Montebello)	Democratic	January 2, 1933 – January 2, 1939	Los Angeles	Elected in 1932. Re-elected in 1934. Re-elected in 1936. Re-elected in 1938. [data missing]
F. Ray Bennett (Los Angeles)	Democratic	January 2, 1939 – October 20, 1942	Los Angeles	Elected in 1938. Re-elected in 1940. Resigned to become a Justice of the Los Angeles County Municipal Court.
Vacant		October 20, 1942 – January 4, 1943	Los Angeles	
Elwyn S. Bennett (Los Angeles)	Democratic	January 4, 1943 – January 8, 1951	Los Angeles	Elected in 1942. Re-elected in 1944. Re-elected in 1946. Re-elected in 1948. Retired.
William A. Munnell (Norwalk)	Democratic	January 8, 1951 – November 30, 1961	Los Angeles	Elected in 1950. Re-elected in 1952. Re-elected in 1954. Re-elected in 1956. Re-elected in 1958. Re-elected in 1960. Resigned to become a Justice of the Los Angeles County Superior Court.
Vacant		November 30, 1961 – January 7, 1963	Los Angeles	
John Moreno (Santa Fe Springs)	Democratic	January 7, 1963 – January 4, 1965	Los Angeles	Elected in 1962. Lost re-election.
Jack R. Fenton (Montebello)	Democratic	January 4, 1965 – November 30, 1974	Los Angeles	Elected in 1964. Re-elected in 1966. Re-elected in 1968. Re-elected in 1970. Re-elected in 1972. Redistricted to the 59th district.
Robert G. Beverly (Manhattan Beach)	Republican	December 2, 1974 – November 30, 1976	Los Angeles	Redistricted from the 46th district and re-elected in 1974. Retired to become a State Senator.
Marilyn Ryan (Rancho Palos Verdes)	Republican	December 6, 1976 – November 30, 1982	Los Angeles	Elected in 1976. Re-elected in 1977. Re-elected in 1978. Re-elected in 1980. Lost re-election.
Gerald N. Felando (Los Angeles)	Republican	December 6, 1982 – November 30, 1992	Los Angeles	Elected in 1982. Re-elected in 1984. Re-elected in 1986. Re-elected in 1988. Re-elected in 1990. Redistricted to the 54th district and lost re-election.
Curtis R. Tucker Jr. (Inglewood)	Democratic	December 7, 1992 – November 30, 1996	Los Angeles	Redistricted from the 50th district and re-elected in 1992. Re-elected in 1994. Termed out.
Edward Vincent (Inglewood)	Democratic	December 2, 1996 – November 30, 2000	Los Angeles	Elected in 1996. Re-elected in 1998. Retired to become a State Senator.
Jerome Horton (Los Angeles)	Democratic	December 4, 2000 – November 30, 2006	Los Angeles	Elected in 2000. Re-elected in 2002. Re-elected in 2004. Termed out.
Curren Price (Los Angeles)	Democratic	December 4, 2006 – June 8, 2009	Los Angeles	Elected in 2006. Elected in 2008. Resigned to become a State Senator.
Vacant		June 8, 2009 – September 10, 2009	Los Angeles	
Steven Bradford (Gardena)	Democratic	September 10, 2009 – November 30, 2012	Los Angeles	Elected to finish Price's term. Re-elected in 2010. Redistricted to the 62nd district.
Jimmy Gomez (Los Angeles)	Democratic	December 3, 2012 – July 11, 2017	Los Angeles	Elected in 2012. Re-elected in 2014. Re-elected in 2016. Resigned to become a member of the U.S. House of Representatives.
Vacant		July 11, 2017 – December 16, 2017	Los Angeles	
Wendy Carrillo (Los Angeles)	Democratic	December 16, 2017 – November 30, 2022	Los Angeles	Elected to finish Gomez's term. Re-elected in 2018. Re-elected in 2020. Redistricted to the 52nd district.
Rick Zbur (Los Angeles)	Democratic	December 5, 2022 – present	Los Angeles	Elected in 2022. Re-elected in 2024.

== Election results (1990-present) ==
=== 2024 ===
2024 California State Assembly 51st district election
Primary election
Party	Candidate	Votes	%
Democratic	Rick Zbur (incumbent)	76,838	78.3
Republican	Stephen Hohil	10,710	10.9
Republican	Shiva Bagheri	10,610	10.8
Total votes		98,158	100.0
General election
Democratic	Rick Zbur (incumbent)	154,114	75.0
Republican	Stephan Hohil	51,365	25.0
Total votes		205,479	100.0
Democratic hold			

=== 2022 ===
2022 California State Assembly 51st district election
Primary election
Party	Candidate	Votes	%
Democratic	Rick Zbur	53,522	61.6
Democratic	Louis Abramson	33,300	38.4
Total votes		86,822	100.0
General election
Democratic	Rick Zbur	76,110	54.9
Democratic	Louis Abramson	62,647	45.1
Total votes		138,757	100.0
Democratic hold			

=== 2020 ===
2020 California State Assembly 51st district election
Primary election
Party	Candidate	Votes	%
Democratic	Wendy Carrillo (incumbent)	73,578	100.0
Total votes		73,578	100.0
General election
Democratic	Wendy Carrillo (incumbent)	127,026	100.0
Total votes		127,026	100.0
Democratic hold			

=== 2018 ===
2018 California State Assembly 51st district election
Primary election
Party	Candidate	Votes	%
Democratic	Wendy Carrillo (incumbent)	42,547	100.0
Libertarian	Christopher Stare (write-in)	4	0.0
Total votes		42,551	100.0
General election
Democratic	Wendy Carrillo (incumbent)	102,276	86.6
Libertarian	Christopher Stare	15,769	13.4
Total votes		118,045	100.0
Democratic hold			

=== 2017 (special) ===
2017 California State Assembly 51st district special election Vacancy resulting from the resignation of Jimmy Gomez
Primary election
Party	Candidate	Votes	%
Democratic	Wendy Carrillo	5,058	22.2
Democratic	Luis López	4,243	18.6
Democratic	Mike Fong	3,675	16.1
Democratic	Gabriel Sandoval	2,370	10.4
Democratic	Ron Birnbaum	2,213	9.7
Democratic	Alex De Ocampo	1,803	7.9
Democratic	David Vela	1,075	4.7
Democratic	Mark Vargas	1,022	4.5
Libertarian	Andrew S. Aguero	405	1.8
No party preference	Patrick Koppula	328	1.4
Democratic	Barbara Torres	284	1.2
Peace and Freedom	John Prysner	232	1.0
Democratic	Mario Olmos	122	0.5
Total votes		22,830	100.0
General election
Democratic	Wendy Carrillo	11,100	53.5
Democratic	Luis López	9,631	46.5
Total votes		20,731	100.0
Democratic hold			

=== 2016 ===
2016 California State Assembly 51st district election
Primary election
Party	Candidate	Votes	%
Democratic	Jimmy Gomez (incumbent)	62,366	100.0
Libertarian	Mike Everling (write-in)	7	0.0
Total votes		62,373	100.0
General election
Democratic	Jimmy Gomez (incumbent)	110,036	86.1
Libertarian	Mike Everling	17,724	13.9
Total votes		127,760	100.0
Democratic hold			

=== 2014 ===
2014 California State Assembly 51st district election
Primary election
Party	Candidate	Votes	%
Democratic	Jimmy Gomez (incumbent)	20,621	99.7
Republican	Stephen C. Smith (write-in)	54	0.3
Total votes		20,675	100.0
General election
Democratic	Jimmy Gomez (incumbent)	42,261	83.6
Republican	Stephen C. Smith	8,277	16.4
Total votes		50,538	100.0
Democratic hold			

=== 2012 ===
2012 California State Assembly 51st district election
Primary election
Party	Candidate	Votes	%
Democratic	Jimmy Gomez	10,452	37.4
Democratic	Luis Lopez	6,871	24.6
Democratic	Arturo Chavez	6,422	23.0
Democratic	Richard Friedberg	3,059	11.0
Democratic	Oscar A. Guttierez	1,128	4.0
Total votes		27,932	100.0
General election
Democratic	Jimmy Gomez	63,292	59.8
Democratic	Luis Lopez	42,618	40.2
Total votes		105,910	100.0
Democratic hold			

=== 2010 ===
2010 California State Assembly 51st district election
Party	Candidate	Votes	%
Democratic	Steven Bradford (incumbent)	69,111	81.7
Green	Cynthia Santiago	15,486	18.3
Total votes		84,597	100.0
Democratic hold			

=== 2009 (special) ===
2009 California State Assembly 51st district special election Vacancy resulting from the resignation of Curren Price
Party	Candidate	Votes	%
Democratic	Steven Bradford	7,580	52.9
Democratic	Gloria D. Gray	2,794	19.5
Republican	David Coffin	2,418	16.9
Democratic	Robert Pullen-Miles	702	4.9
Democratic	Thomas Jefferson Cares	664	4.6
Democratic	Mervin Leon Evans	173	1.2
Total votes		14,331	100.0
Democratic hold			

=== 2008 ===
2008 California State Assembly 51st district election
Party	Candidate	Votes	%
Democratic	Curren Price (incumbent)	95,589	76.7
Republican	Reece Pollack	23,515	18.9
Libertarian	Carl Swinney	5,563	4.5
Total votes		124,667	100.0
Democratic hold			

=== 2006 ===
2006 California State Assembly 51st district election
Party	Candidate	Votes	%
Democratic	Curren Price	52,671	73.9
Republican	Ross Moen	16,241	22.8
Libertarian	Carl Swinney	2,322	3.3
Total votes		71,234	100.0
Democratic hold			

=== 2004 ===
2004 California State Assembly 51st district election
Party	Candidate	Votes	%
Democratic	Jerome Horton (incumbent)	89,509	84.1
Libertarian	Daniel R. Sherman	16,941	15.9
Total votes		106,450	100.0
Democratic hold			

=== 2002 ===
2002 California State Assembly 51st district election
Party	Candidate	Votes	%
Democratic	Jerome Horton (incumbent)	50,191	100.0
Total votes		50,191	100.0
Democratic hold			

=== 2000 ===
2000 California State Assembly 51st district election
Party	Candidate	Votes	%
Democratic	Jerome Horton	70,169	77.9
Republican	Antoine Hawkins	19,910	22.1
Total votes		90,079	100.0
Democratic hold			

=== 1998 ===
1998 California State Assembly 51st district election
Party	Candidate	Votes	%
Democratic	Edward Vincent (incumbent)	52,951	77.0
Republican	Robert Acherman	13,202	19.2
Green	Rex Frankel	2,619	3.8
Total votes		68,772	100.0
Democratic hold			

=== 1996 ===
1996 California State Assembly 51st district election
Party	Candidate	Votes	%
Democratic	Edward Vincent (incumbent)	58,333	73.2
Republican	Anthony Clarke	21,334	26.8
Total votes		79,667	100.0
Democratic hold			

=== 1994 ===
1994 California State Assembly 51st district election
Party	Candidate	Votes	%
Democratic	Curtis R. Tucker, Jr. (incumbent)	46,037	69.6
Republican	Adam Michelin	20,151	30.4
Total votes		66,188	100.0
Democratic hold			

=== 1992 ===
1992 California State Assembly 51st district election
Party	Candidate	Votes	%
Democratic	Curtis R. Tucker, Jr. (incumbent)	74,904	81.9
Libertarian	Clark W. Hanley	11,236	12.3
Peace and Freedom	Xenia Geraldina Williams	5,270	5.8
Total votes		91,410	100.0
Democratic gain from Republican			

=== 1990 ===
1990 California State Assembly 51st district election
Party	Candidate	Votes	%
Republican	Gerald N. Felando (incumbent)	60,580	58.3
Democratic	Marilyn J. Landan	39,016	37.6
Libertarian	William N. Gaillard	4,292	4.1
Total votes		103,888	100.0
Republican hold			

== See also ==
- California State Assembly
- California State Assembly districts
- Districts in California
