= Rick Zbur =

American politician (born 1957)

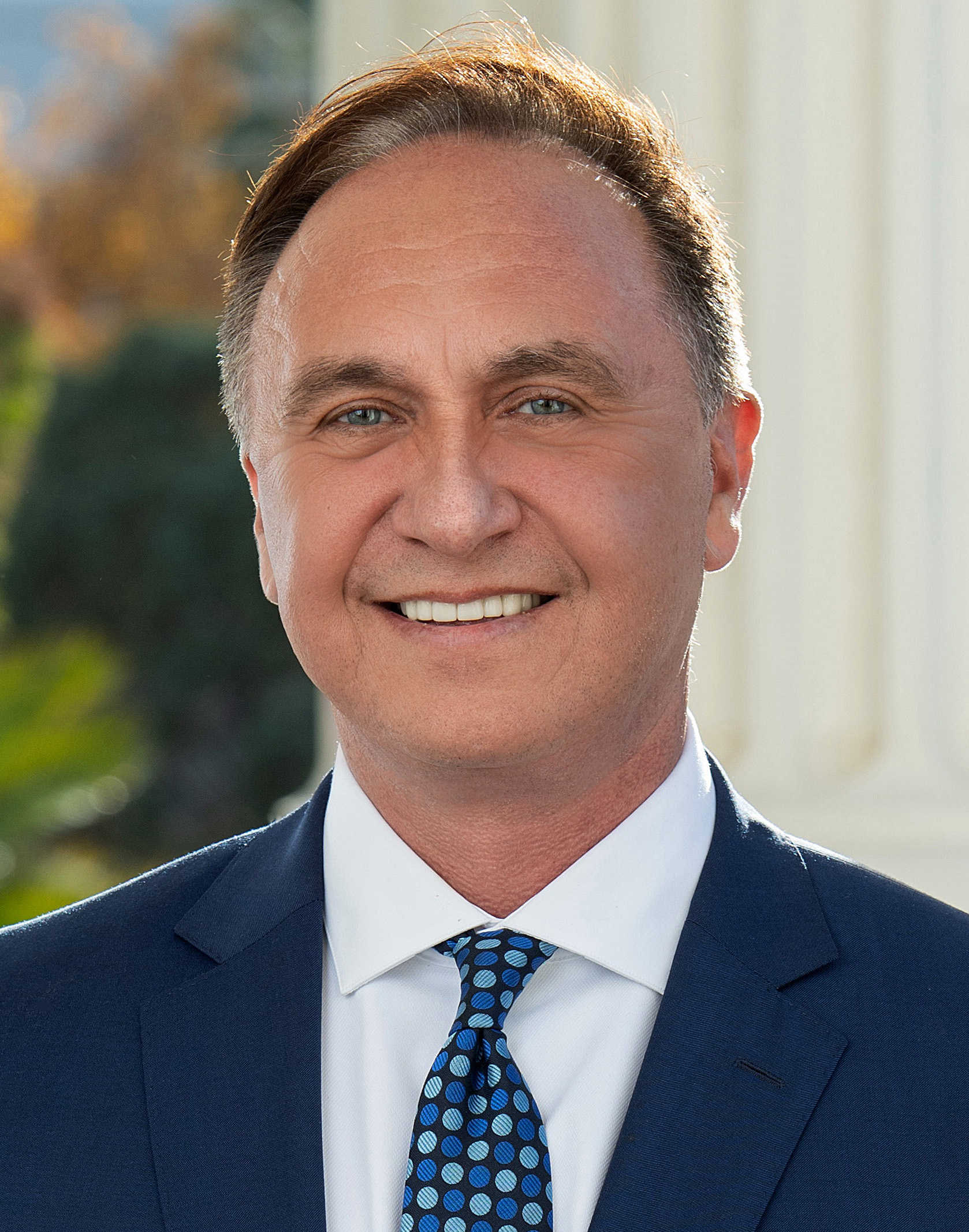
- Official portrait, 2022

Member of the California State Assembly from the 51st district
- Incumbent
- Assumed office December 5, 2022
- Preceded by: Richard Bloom

Personal details
- Born: March 2, 1957 (age 69) New Mexico, U.S.
- Party: Democratic
- Education: Yale University (BA); Harvard University (JD)
- Website: Campaign website

Rick Chavez Zbur (born March 2, 1957) is an American attorney currently serving in the California State Assembly representing the 51st district.

He is also a former United States House of Representatives candidate. He is a well-known LGBT civil rights advocate and is active in the environmental movement. Zbur is also notable as the first openly gay non-incumbent U.S. congressional primary candidate to win an election.

== Personal life ==
Zbur grew up on a farm in the Rio Grande Valley of rural New Mexico with his mother, Erlinda Chavez Zbur. He currently lives in Los Angeles. Zbur has distant Sephardi Jewish ancestry.

== Career ==
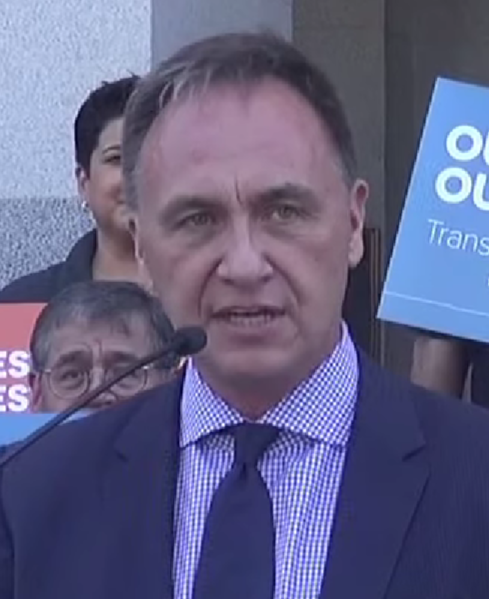
Zbur giving a speech in 2016.

Zbur practiced environmental law for about three decades before retiring from Latham & Watkins in 2014. In 1996, Zbur ran for the United States House of Representatives in California's then Long Beach-based 38th congressional district against moderate GOP incumbent Steve Horn. Zbur has also been a chair of the California League of Conservation Voters board of directors from 2011 to 2017. Zbur led Equality California, the largest LGBT civil rights organization in California. from 2014 to 2021.

== Activism ==
=== LGBT rights ===
Zbur is openly gay and has been a vocal leader in the LGBT civil rights movement for nearly four decades. In 2014, Zbur became the executive director of Equality California, the largest LGBT civil rights organization in California., a role he left in 2021.

=== HIV/AIDS ===
In the early 1980s, Zbur campaigned to fight against HIV/AIDS. He also helped found the Children Affected by AIDS Foundation. In 1992, together with the LGBT community in Los Angeles, Zbur organized fundraisers for Bill Clinton, then Governor of Arkansas, and Barbara Boxer, then a Congresswoman who was running for the U.S. Senate Both were elected.

=== Environmental movement ===
As an environmental lawyer, Zbur has been active in the environmental movement in California. He served as president of the California League of Conservation Voters from 2011 to 2017.

== Political campaigns ==
=== 1996 U.S. House of Representatives run ===
In 1996, Zbur ran for the United States House of Representatives in California's 38th congressional district against Republican incumbent Steve Horn, a two-term moderate. He became the first openly gay non-incumbent congressional primary candidate to win an election when he won the Democratic primary election on March 26, 1996. He then went on to lose the general election to Horn.

During his congressional campaign, Zbur's key legislative priorities included environmental protection, Social Security, and Medicare.

=== 2022 Los Angeles City Attorney election announcement ===
In April 2020, Zbur announced that he would be running in the 2022 Los Angeles City Attorney election. He later decided not to compete in the election, instead running for the State Assembly.

== California State Assembly (2022–present) ==
=== Election ===
In 2021, Zbur announced a run for the California State in Assembly District 51, a newly re-drawn district which includes Hollywood, Beverly Hills, Westwood Village, and Santa Monica. He won the primary and then the general election in 2022.

Zbur is a member of the California Legislative Progressive Caucus.

=== Tenure ===
In 2025, Zbur led opposition in the California State Assembly against SB 79, bipartisan legislation to increase housing supply in California amid a housing shortage. The legislation, which passed, permitted dense housing near major public transit stations. Zbur gave a speech defending single-family exclusive zoning.

== Electoral history ==
=== U.S. House of Representatives ===
1996 California's 38th congressional district election
Primary election
Party	Candidate	Votes	%
Democratic	Rick Zbur	21,190	51.39
Democratic	Peter Mathews	20,041	48.61
Total votes		41,231	100.00
General election
Republican	Steve Horn (incumbent)	88,136	52.57
Democratic	Rick Zbur	71,627	42.73
Green	William Yeager	4,610	2.75
Libertarian	Paul Gautreau	3,272	1.95
Total votes		167,645	100.00
Republican hold			

=== California State Assembly ===
2022 California State Assembly 51st district election
Primary election
Party	Candidate	Votes	%
Democratic	Rick Zbur	53,522	61.6
Democratic	Louis Abramson	33,300	38.4
Total votes		86,822	100.0
General election
Democratic	Rick Zbur	76,110	54.9
Democratic	Louis Abramson	62,647	45.1
Total votes		138,757	100.0
Democratic hold			

2024 California State Assembly 51st district election
Primary election
Party	Candidate	Votes	%
Democratic	Rick Zbur (incumbent)	76,838	78.3
Republican	Stephen Hohil	10,710	10.9
Republican	Shiva Bagheri	10,610	10.8
Total votes		98,158	100.0
General election
Democratic	Rick Zbur (incumbent)	154,114	75.0
Republican	Stephan Hohil	51,365	25.0
Total votes		205,479	100.0
Democratic hold			
