= Jonathan J. Hollibaugh =

American politician

Member of the California State Assembly from the 52nd district
- In office January 4, 1943 - June 11, 1953
- Preceded by: William H. Poole
- Succeeded by: Frank G. Bonelli

Personal details
- Born: July 13, 1891 Knowlton, Iowa
- Died: June 11, 1953 (aged 61) Sacramento, California
- Party: Republican
- Spouse: Mary Ann Shields (m. 1920)

Military service
- Branch/service: United States Army
- Battles/wars: World War I

Jonathan Josiah Hollibaugh (July 13, 1891 - June 11, 1953) served in the California State Assembly for the 52nd district from 1943 to his death in 1953 and during World War I he served in the United States Army.
