= Gerald N. Felando =

American politician (1934–2023)

Member of the California State Assembly from the 51st district
- In office December 6, 1982 – November 30, 1992
- Preceded by: Marilyn Ryan
- Succeeded by: Curtis R. Tucker, Jr.

Member of the California State Assembly from the 52nd district
- In office December 4, 1978 – November 30, 1982
- Preceded by: Vincent Thomas
- Succeeded by: Frank Hill

Personal details
- Born: December 29, 1934 San Pedro, California, U.S.
- Died: August 23, 2023 (aged 88) San Pedro, California, U.S.
- Party: Republican
- Children: 2
- Education: University of Southern California, College of Dentistry.
- Occupation: Dentist

Military service
- Branch/service: United States Coast Guard

Gerald N. Felando (December 29, 1934 – August 23, 2023) was an American politician from California and a member of the Republican party. He was a practicing dentist with an office in Torrance when he began his political career.

== State Assembly ==
In 1978 Felando ran for the 51st district in the California State Assembly and defeated veteran 19-term incumbent Vincent Thomas (D-San Pedro), the dean of the Democratic delegation, in what turned out to be a great year for Republicans across the state. In 1980 Felando won reelection over Democrat Louis L. Dominguez, a onetime district staffer for Thomas, by more than 7 points. This would be Felando's last close general election race until 1992.

In 1981 reapportionment merged Felando's 52nd assembly district with the neighboring 51st, then represented by Republican Marilyn Ryan. He faced off against Ryan in the 1982 Republican primary and attacked her past opposition to 1978's Proposition 13, which was very popular in her district, as well as labeling her as "one of the most liberal Republicans in the legislature". Despite the fact that she represented 85% of the redrawn district, Felando narrowly defeated her in an upset. He went on to easily beat Democratic attorney Peter S. Helfer (who would be appointed to the Sacramento Superior Court in 2011) in the general election.

In 1984 Felando had another easy reelection, this time against Democrat Doris G. Tate, mother of murdered actress Sharon Tate. In 1986 he routed Democratic attorney Jon Mercant.

In 1988, however, he faced a stiff and expensive primary challenge from Dean Dana III, son of then Los Angeles County Supervisor Dean Dana. Felando had declared a run for the congressional seat of Rep. Dan Lungren (R-Long Beach) but decided to seek reelection to the assembly instead when it looked like Lundgren was going to run for reelection. The younger Dana had already declared for the seat and refused to back off once Felando reentered the race, spending more than $700,000 against the incumbent in an ultimately unsuccessful effort. In the general election Felando easily defeated Democratic Torrance city councilman Mark Wirth.

After an easy reelection in 1990 (against Marilyn Landau, an administrative assistance at RAND corporation), Felando himself was defeated in an upset in 1992 by Democrat Betty Karnette, a teacher at South Gate Middle School, in the redrawn 54th assembly district.

In 2000 he made one last unsuccessful run for state assembly, this time for the Torrance-based 53rd district represented by Democrat George Nakano.

== Death ==
On August 23, 2023 Felando died in his home in San Pedro, at the age of 88.

== Electoral history ==
Member, California State Assembly: 1978–1992
Year	Office	Democrat	Votes	Pct	Republican	Votes	Pct
1978	California State Assembly; District 52	Vincent Thomas	27,462	44.9%	Gerald Felando	33,737	55.1%
1980	California State Assembly; District 52	Louis L. Dominguez	33,684	43.2%	Gerald Felando	40,476	51.%
1982	California State Assembly; District 51	Peter Helfer	34,775	29.9%	Gerald Felando 51.6% Marilyn Ryan 48.4%	77,833	66.8%
1984	California State Assembly; District 51	Doris G. Tate	38,406	28.4%	Gerald Felando	93,014	68.7%
1986	California State Assembly; District 51	Jon Mercant	30,056	27.5%	Gerald Felando	75,879	69.3%
1988	California State Assembly; District 51	Mark Wirth	47,780	34.3%	Dean Dana III 44% Gerald Felando 56%	87,394	62.7%
1990	California State Assembly; District 51	Marilyn Landau	39,016	37.6%	Gerald Felando	60,580	58.3%
1992	California State Assembly; District 54	Betty Karnette	78,400	51.9%	Gerald Felando	66,282	43.9%
2000	California State Assembly; District 53	George Nakano	53,849	64.3%	Gerald Felando	53,017	32.7%

California Assembly
Preceded by Vincent Thomas	Member of the California State Assembly from the 52nd district December 4, 1978 – November 30, 1982	Succeeded by Frank Hill
Preceded by Marilyn Ryan	Member of the California State Assembly from the 51st district November 30, 1982 – November 30, 1992	Succeeded by Curtis R. Tucker, Jr.
