= Floyd L. Wakefield =

American politician (1919–2007)

Member of the California State Assembly from the 52nd district
- In office January 2, 1967 - November 30, 1974
- Preceded by: George A. Willson
- Succeeded by: Vincent Thomas

Personal details
- Born: December 4, 1919 Denver, Colorado, US
- Died: April 5, 2007 (aged 87) Laguna Hills, California, US
- Party: Republican
- Spouse: Ruth Wakefield
- Children: 3

Military service
- Branch/service: United States Army
- Battles/wars: World War II

Floyd Lee Wakefield (December 4, 1919 – April 5, 2007) served in the California State Assembly for the 52nd district from 1967 to 1974 and during World War II he served in the United States Army.
