= Wendy Carrillo =

Salvadoran-American politician (born 1980)

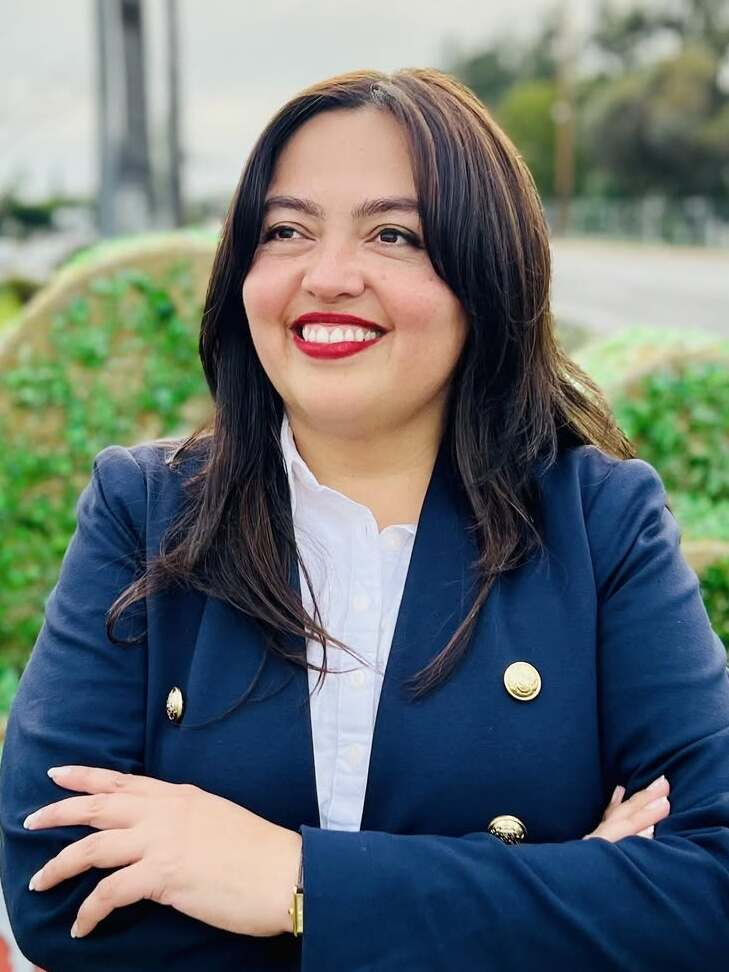
- Carrillo in 2024

Member of the California State Assembly
- In office December 16, 2017 – November 30, 2024
- Preceded by: Jimmy Gomez
- Succeeded by: Jessica Caloza
- Constituency: 51st district (2017–2022); 52nd district (2022–2024)

Personal details
- Born: August 10, 1980 (age 45) El Salvador
- Party: Democratic
- Education: California State University, Los Angeles (BA); University of Southern California (MA)

Wendy Maria Carrillo Dono (born August 10, 1980) is a Salvadoran-born American politician who served in the California State Assembly from 2017 to 2024. A member of the Democratic Party, she represented the 52nd State Assembly district, encompassing parts of northeastern Los Angeles and East Los Angeles. She was sworn into office by Assembly Speaker Anthony Rendon on December 16, 2017, after winning the special election to succeed Congressman Jimmy Gomez. Carrillo is the first Salvadoran immigrant and the first formerly illegal immigrant to be elected to the State Assembly.

== Early life and education ==
Wendy Carrillo was born in El Salvador on August 10, 1980, the oldest of five daughters. Her mother immigrated to the United States when Carrillo was a child, as she felt it was unsafe to remain in El Salvador due to civil war. Carrillo's mother worked as a babysitter. From this, she was able to save enough money to bring Carrillo, along with Carrillo's grandmother and aunt, to the United States. She moved to Los Angeles at age 5, and grew up in Boyle Heights and City Terrace. She received residency at age 13 after her father petitioned for her. At age 21, she applied to become a naturalized citizen and was granted citizenship.

Carrillo attended Harrison Elementary, El Sereno Middle School and Roosevelt High. She is a graduate of both East Los Angeles College and Cal State Los Angeles. Carrillo earned a master's degree, with an emphasis in demography and politics, from the University of Southern California.

== Earlier career ==
For ten years, she was the host and executive producer of a community-based radio program called "Knowledge is Power" on KPWR 106 FM. Carillo also worked as a writer and producer for Nuvo TV. She was also a regular contributor to Pivot's Take Part Live, Huff Post Live, The Young Turks' The Point and Al Jazeera America. In 2014, she was the co-founder of now-defunct Reported.ly, which was a social media startup that aimed at covering issues of conflict, human rights and political movements. She was also a communications manager for labor union called Local 271, the Los Angeles affiliate of Service Employees International Union.

In 2017, Carrillo announced her intention to run to replace then Congressman Xavier Becerra following his appointment to Attorney General of California. Carrillo ultimately received 5% and lost to then State Assemblyman Jimmy Gomez and attorney Robert Lee Ahn.

== California State Assembly ==
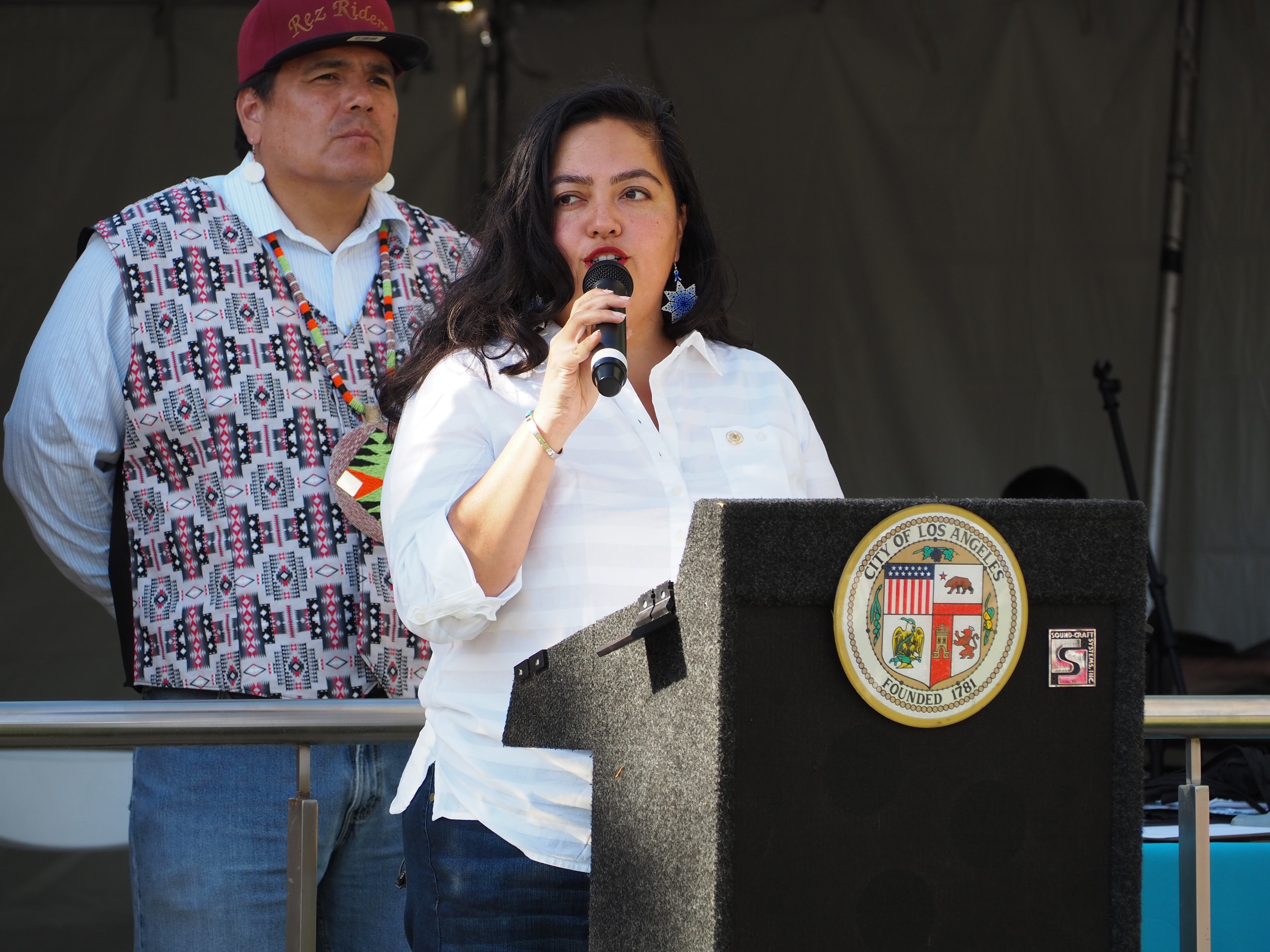
Carrillo speaking during L.A.'s first Indigenous Peoples' Day in 2018.

Following Gomez's resignation to be formally seated in the United States House of Representatives, Carrillo announced that she would run to replace Gomez in the California State Assembly. On October 3, 2017, Carrillo received 22.2% of the vote and secured a spot in the general election. Carrillo faced Planned Parenthood – Los Angeles board member Luis Lopez. On December 5, 2017, Carrillo defeated Lopez, receiving 53.5% of the vote.

In 2018, Carrillo faced libertarian adjunct professor Christopher Stare. Carrillo easily defeated Stare as expected, receiving 86.6% of the vote. In 2020, Carrillo ran unopposed in both the primary and general election.

On October 22, 2022, Los Angeles City Councilmember-elect Eunisses Hernandez alleged that a female canvasser for Congressman Jimmy Gomez and Carrillo made anti-Asian comments about their challengers, David Kim, who is Korean-American, and Mia Livas Porter, who is Filipina-American, respectively, while visiting Hernandez's home. In late October 2022, a Highland Park voter made similar allegations except this time it involved two female canvassers. In response, both Gomez's and Carrillo's campaigns offered an apology to their challengers and reached out to Hernandez via Twitter and separate phone conversations assuring that they had taken action to ensure the canvasser(s)-in-question were no longer part of the campaign.

In June 2023, during a protest led by UNITE HERE Local 11, the Los Angeles Police Department arrested Carrillo after she refused to disperse.

In April 2023, she announced her decision to run for the Los Angeles City Council district 14 against the incumbent Kevin de León, instead of running for reelection to the State Assembly. Carillo lost the election held on March 5, 2024, garnering only 15% of the vote.

During her tenure, Carrillo was a member of the California Legislative Progressive Caucus.

== Personal life ==
In November 2023, Carrillo was arrested on suspicion of driving while intoxicated after crashing into two parked cars and testing over double the state's legal alcohol limit.

== Electoral history ==
Electoral history of Wendy Carrillo
Year	Office	Party	Primary			General			Result	Swing
Year	Office	Party	Total	%	P.	Total	%	P.	Result	Swing
2017 sp	State Assembly	Democratic	5,058	22.2%	1st	11,110	53.5%	1st	Won	Hold
2018	State Assembly	Democratic	42,547	100.00%	1st	102,276	86.6%	1st	Won	Hold
2020	State Assembly	Democratic	73,578	100.00%	1st	127,026	100.00%	1st	Won	Hold
2022	State Assembly	Democratic	43,040	49.2%	1st	65,039	56.9%	1st	Won	Hold
2024	City Council	Nonpartisan	5,321	15.14%	4th				Lost	N/A
