= Marilyn Ryan (California politician) =

American politician

Marilyn G. Ryan

Member of the California State Assembly from the 51st district
- In office December 6, 1976 – November 30, 1982
- Preceded by: Robert G. Beverly
- Succeeded by: Gerald N. Felando

Personal details
- Born: December 10, 1932 Milbank, South Dakota, U.S.
- Died: June 22, 2008 (aged 75) Laguna Woods, California, U.S.
- Party: Republican
- Children: 2

Marilyn G. Ryan (December 10, 1932 – June 22, 2008) was an American civic leader and politician from California and a member of the Republican party.

== Civic Leadership ==
Ryan was a co-founder of Save Our Coastlines, which battled Los Angeles County over development on the Rancho Palos Verdes peninsula. She was instrumental in the incorporation of Rancho Palos Verdes as a city and served as its first mayor.

== State Assembly ==
In 1976 she was elected to the coastal 51st district in California State Assembly being vacated by Republican Robert G. Beverly who was running for state senate. She had little trouble winning reelection in 1978 and 1980 in the heavily Republican district.

While in office, she founded the California Elected Women's Association and worked to secure state funding to preserve Torrance's Madrona Marsh.

In 1981 a Democratic-led reapportionment dismantled GOP assemblyman Gerald Felando's neighboring San Pedro-Torrance based 52nd district, and parts of it (including his home) were drawn into Ryan's 51st district, a coastal area based in the Palos Verdes Peninsula and surrounding beach cities. A moderate Republican, Ryan represented 85% of the redrawn district, and the more conservative Felando chose to challenge her in the primary. She actually was well ahead for most of the race, but within the last few weeks, Felando's campaign began to attack her past opposition to 1978's anti-tax Proposition 13, which was overwhelmingly popular in this district with many wealthy homeowners. The attacks proved effective, and Felando upset Ryan by just over 2 percentage points.

After her time in the legislature came to an end, she was appointed as director of the California Arts Council by GOP Governor George Deukmejian. She served what turned out to be a tumultuous term from 1983 to 1985.

== Death ==
Ryan died of congestive heart failure at the age of 75 at her home in Laguna Woods, California.

== Electoral history ==
Member, California State Assembly: 1976–1982
Year	Office	Democrat	Votes	Pct	Republican	Votes	Pct
1976	California State Assembly; District 51	Charles Post III	42,047	38.8%	Marilyn Ryan	66,335	61.2%
1978	California State Assembly; District 51	Dave Helgevold	27,235	31.9%	Marilyn Ryan	58,101	68.1%
1980	California State Assembly; District 51	Mark Wirth	20,139	18.4%	Marilyn Ryan	82,876	75.8%
1982	California State Assembly; District 51	Peter S. Helfer	146,511	29.9%	Gerald Felando 51.6% Marilyn Ryan 48.4%	77,833	66.8%

California Assembly
Preceded by Robert G. Beverly	Member of the California State Assembly; 51st District; December 4, 1976 – November 30, 1982	Succeeded by Gerald Felando
