= Vincent Thomas =

American politician

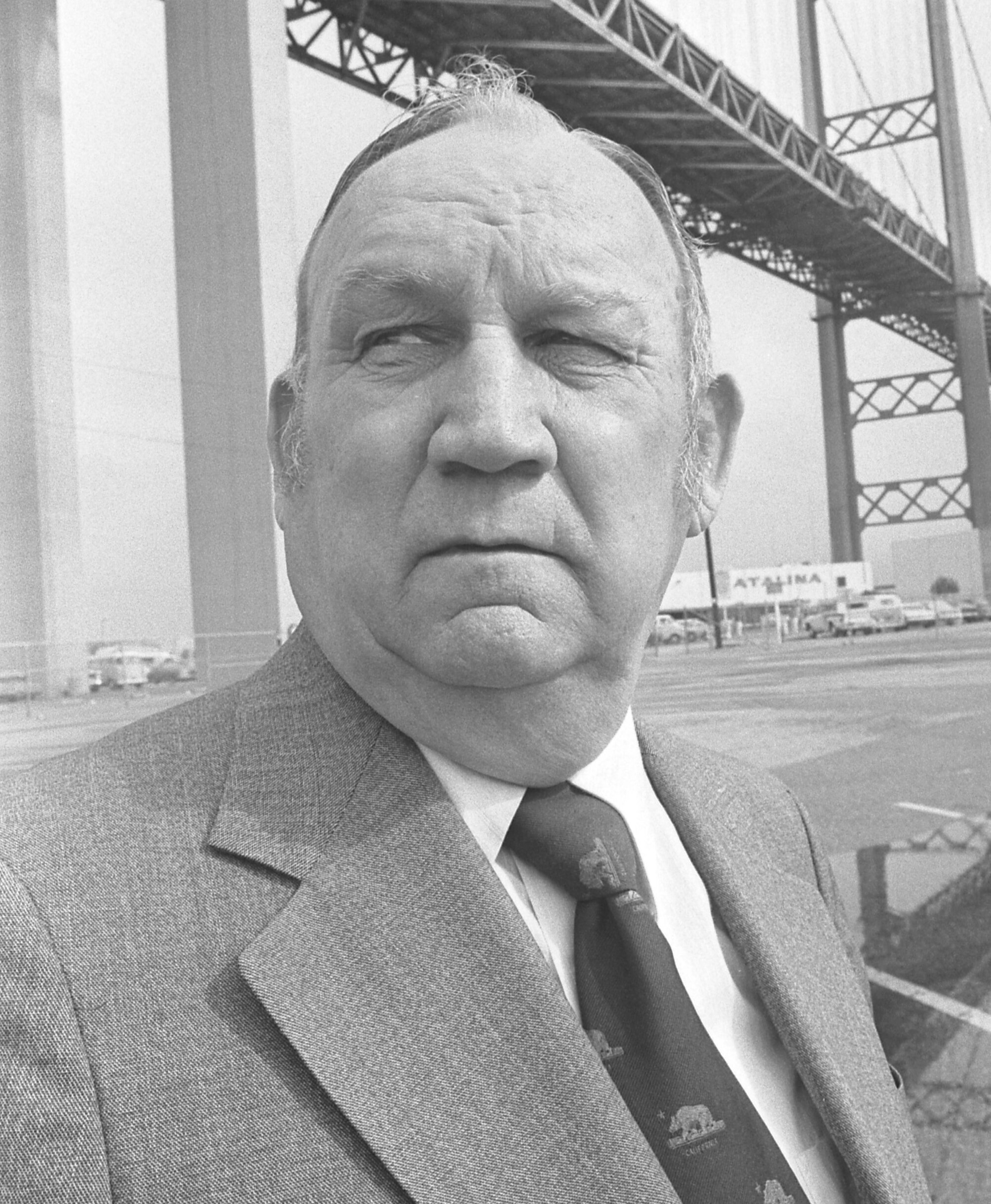
- Thomas in 1978

Minority Leader of the California Assembly
- In office 1955–1957
- Preceded by: Julian Beck
- Succeeded by: William A. Munnell

Member of the California State Assembly
- In office January 6, 1941 – November 30, 1978
- Preceded by: Fred Reaves
- Succeeded by: Gerald N. Felando
- Constituency: 68th district (1941–1974); 52nd district (1974–1978)

Personal details
- Born: April 16, 1907 Biloxi, Mississippi, U.S.
- Died: January 31, 1980 (aged 72) San Pedro, California, U.S.
- Party: Democratic
- Spouse: Mary Di Carlo (m. 1947)
- Children: 2
- Profession: Politician

Vincent Thomas (April 16, 1907 – January 31, 1980) was a Democratic Party politician from California who represented San Pedro's 68th and 52nd Districts in the California Assembly from 1941 to 1978.

== Childhood and education ==
Born in Biloxi, Mississippi, Thomas was the third of eight children of Croatian immigrants who came to America in 1903. His family moved from Mississippi to Oakland, California in 1917, and then to San Pedro in 1919. In 1928, he graduated from San Pedro High School.

He received a bachelor's degree from the University of Santa Clara in 1932 and attended the University of Santa Clara and Loyola Law Schools from 1932 to 1936. He worked as a minor sports coach and physical education instructor while in college. He also played football for Santa Clara.

After graduating law school, Thomas did not open his own practice, but found a job in a fish processing factory that was owned by Martin J. Bogdanovich, a fellow Croatian from the Island of Vis. While with the factory, Thomas was encouraged to engage himself in politics.

== Political career ==
Thomas entered politics and was successful in his first run for office in 1940, resoundingly defeating Charles M. Smith to become the State Assemblyman for the 68th District representing San Pedro.

He also served as Chairman of the Committee on Intergovernmental Relations. Thomas had the longest record of service in the Assembly and was known affectionately as "Dean of the Assembly". In 1974, his district was redrawn as the 52nd Assembly District. Ultimately, he served in the Assembly for 19 consecutive terms, until his first defeat in a re-election bid by Republican candidate Gerald N. Felando in 1978. Thomas also served as the Assembly's minority leader in 1955.

=== Vincent Thomas Bridge ===
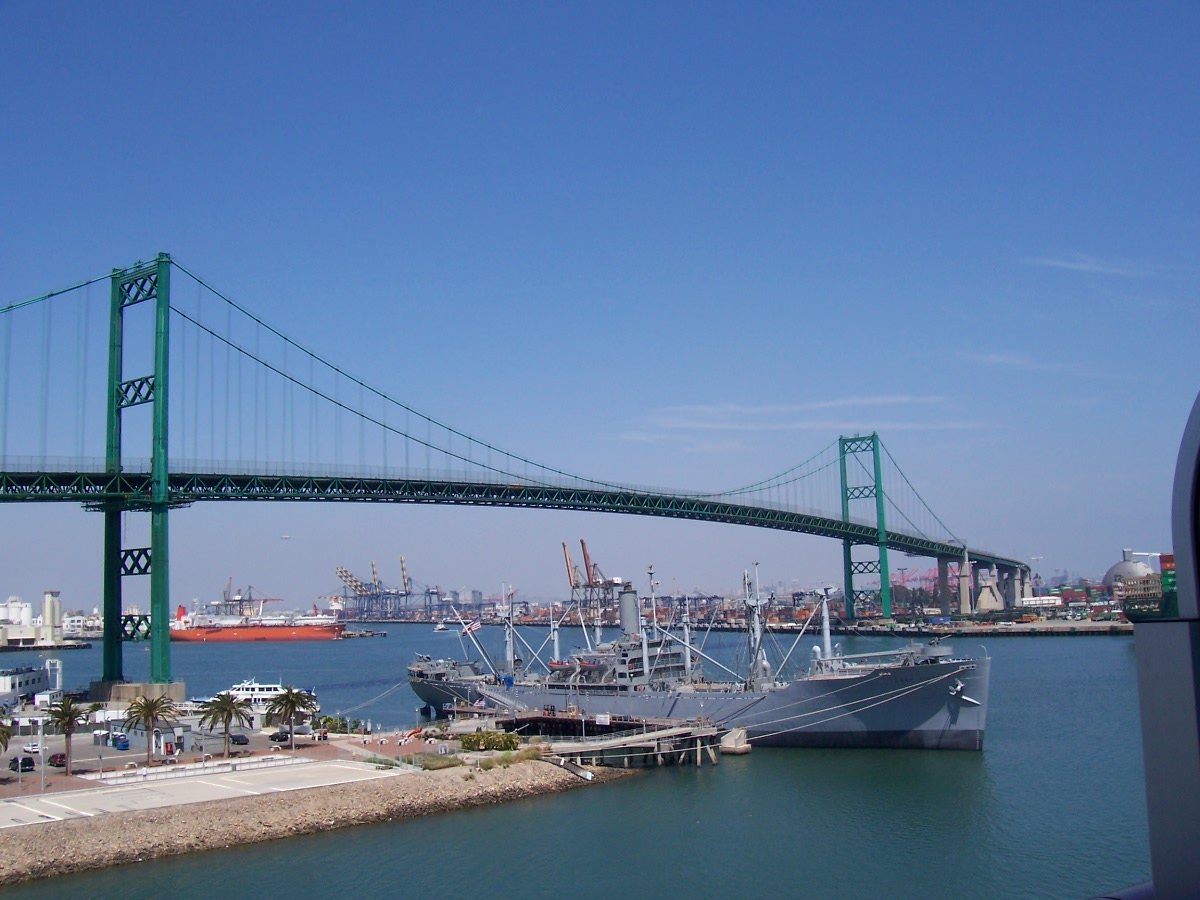
Vincent Thomas Bridge

Originally slated to be called the "San Pedro-Terminal Island Bridge" when construction began in 1960, in 1961 the California Legislature passed Concurrent Resolution 131 naming the suspension bridge planned between San Pedro and Terminal Island for Thomas in honor of his foresight and untiring work that culminated in its construction. The bridge was dedicated as the Vincent Thomas Bridge and opened to traffic on November 15, 1963. Thomas paid the very first toll, which was then 25 cents.

== Death ==
Thomas died in San Pedro, California in 1980, aged 72.

Preceded by Fred Reaves	California State Assemblyman, 68th District; January 6, 1941 - November 30, 1974	Succeeded by Walter M. Ingalls
Preceded by Floyd L. Wakefield	California State Assemblyman, 52nd District; December 2, 1974 - November 30, 1978	Succeeded by Gerald N. Felando
