= Robert G. Beverly =

American politician

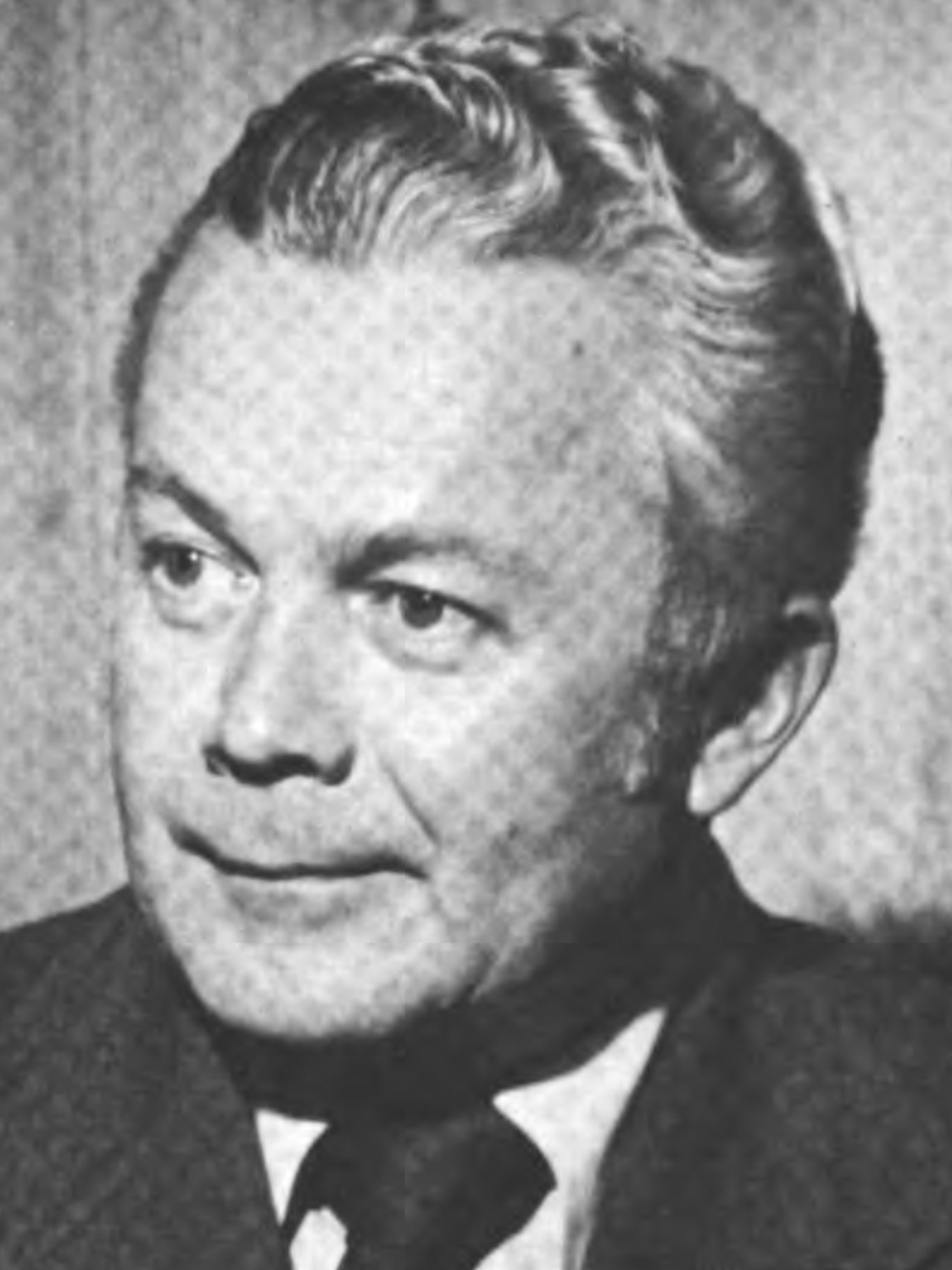

Member of the California State Senate
- In office December 7, 1992 – November 30, 1996
- Preceded by: Bill Greene
- Succeeded by: Betty Karnette
- Constituency: 27th district
- In office December 3, 1984 – November 30, 1992
- Preceded by: Bill Greene
- Succeeded by: Frank Hill
- Constituency: 29th district
- In office December 6, 1976 – November 30, 1984
- Preceded by: David Roberti
- Succeeded by: Bill Greene
- Constituency: 27th district

Minority Leader of the California Assembly
- In office 1973–1975
- Preceded by: Robert T. Monagan
- Succeeded by: Paul V. Priolo

Member of the California State Assembly
- In office May 16, 1967 – November 30, 1976
- Preceded by: Charles Edward Chapel
- Succeeded by: Marilyn Ryan
- Constituency: 46th district (1967–1974); 51st district (1974–1976)

Member of the Manhattan Beach City Council
- In office 1958–1967

Personal details
- Born: July 1, 1925 Belmont, Massachusetts
- Died: October 14, 2009 (aged 84) Manhattan Beach, California
- Party: Republican
- Spouse: Elizabeth L. Weisel
- Children: 4

Military service
- Branch/service: United States Marine Corps
- Battles/wars: World War II

Robert Graham "Bob" Beverly (July 1, 1925 – October 14, 2009) was an American attorney and politician from California and a member of the Republican Party.

== Early life ==
Robert Graham Beverly was born July 1, 1925, in Belmont, Massachusetts, as an only child to William Beverly and the former Helen Graham. His father, who was in the insurance business, died when Beverly was a teenager.

Beverly met his future wife in high school. He followed her to Los Angeles, and they were married in 1946. After serving in the Marine Corps, mainly on the East Coast, Beverly attended UCLA, then earned a law degree at Loyola Marymount University in the early 1950s. He then moved to Manhattan Beach and started practicing law.

== Political career ==
In 1958, Beverly launched his political career, winning a seat on the Manhattan Beach City Council. He served for nine years, including three terms as mayor.

In 1967, Beverly won a special election to the California State Assembly. The 46th district was vacant due to the death of veteran incumbent Charles Edward Chapel. He was reelected four more times with relative ease (1967-76), serving as minority leader from 1973 until 1976.

He left the assembly in 1976 to challenge state senator James Wedworth (D-Hawthorne) in a district that had been redrawn due to reapportionment. Beverly won easily, defeating the incumbent by more than 23 points. He then had little trouble holding the seat (numbered both the 27th and the 29th during his tenure) until 1992, when he won a surprisingly close race against an unknown, underfunded Democrat in a district that had been redrawn after the 1991 reapportionment.

He retired from elective office in 1996, though he did serve briefly on the state Lottery Commission from 1997 to 1998.

== Death ==
On October 14, 2009, Beverly died of complications from Parkinson's disease in Manhattan Beach, California.

== Electoral history ==
Member, California State Assembly: 1967–1976 Member, California State Senate : 1976–1996
Year	Office	Democrat	Votes	Pct	Republican	Votes	Pct
1967	California State Assembly; District 46	J. O. "Lee" Solomon	7,545	24.4%	Robert Beverly	23,334	75.6%
1968	California State Assembly; District 46	James Roberts	26,729	23.9%	Robert Beverly	82,382	73.8%
1970	California State Assembly; District 46	Steve Nordeck	29,842	29.1%	Robert Beverly	70,404	68.7%
1972	California State Assembly; District 46	Jack Halloway	34,549	25.8%	Robert Beverly	93,246	69.7%
1974	California State Assembly; District 51	Betty Brennan	28,142	34.6%	Robert Beverly	53,185	64.5%
1976	California State Senate; District 27	James Wedworth	70,457	38.7%	Robert Beverly	111,588	61.3%
1980	California State Senate; District 27	Dave Buckland	38,879	21.1%	Robert Beverly	132,253	71.7%
1984	California State Senate; District 29	Suzanne Distaso	67,729	26.6%	Robert Beverly	177,272	69.7%
1988	California State Senate; District 29	Jack Hachmeister	75,345	29.3%	Robert Beverly	178,131	67.4%
1992	California State Senate; District 27	Brian Finander	123,956	45.4%	Robert Beverly	129,010	47.3%

California Senate
Preceded by Bill Greene	Member of the California State from the 27th district November 30, 1992 – November 30, 1996	Succeeded by Betty Karnette
California Senate
Preceded by Bill Greene	Member of the California State from the 29th district November 30, 1984 – November 30, 1992	Succeeded by Frank Hill
California Senate
Preceded by David Roberti	Member of the California State from the 27th district December 4, 1976 – November 30, 1984	Succeeded by Bill Greene
California Assembly
Preceded by Robert T. Monagan	Member of the California State Assembly; 51st District; December 4, 1974 – December 4, 1976	Succeeded by Marilyn Ryan
California Assembly
Preceded by Charles Edward Chapel	Member of the California State Assembly; 46th District; May 9, 1967 – December 4, 1974	Succeeded by Paul V. Priolo
