= Bill Greene =

American politician

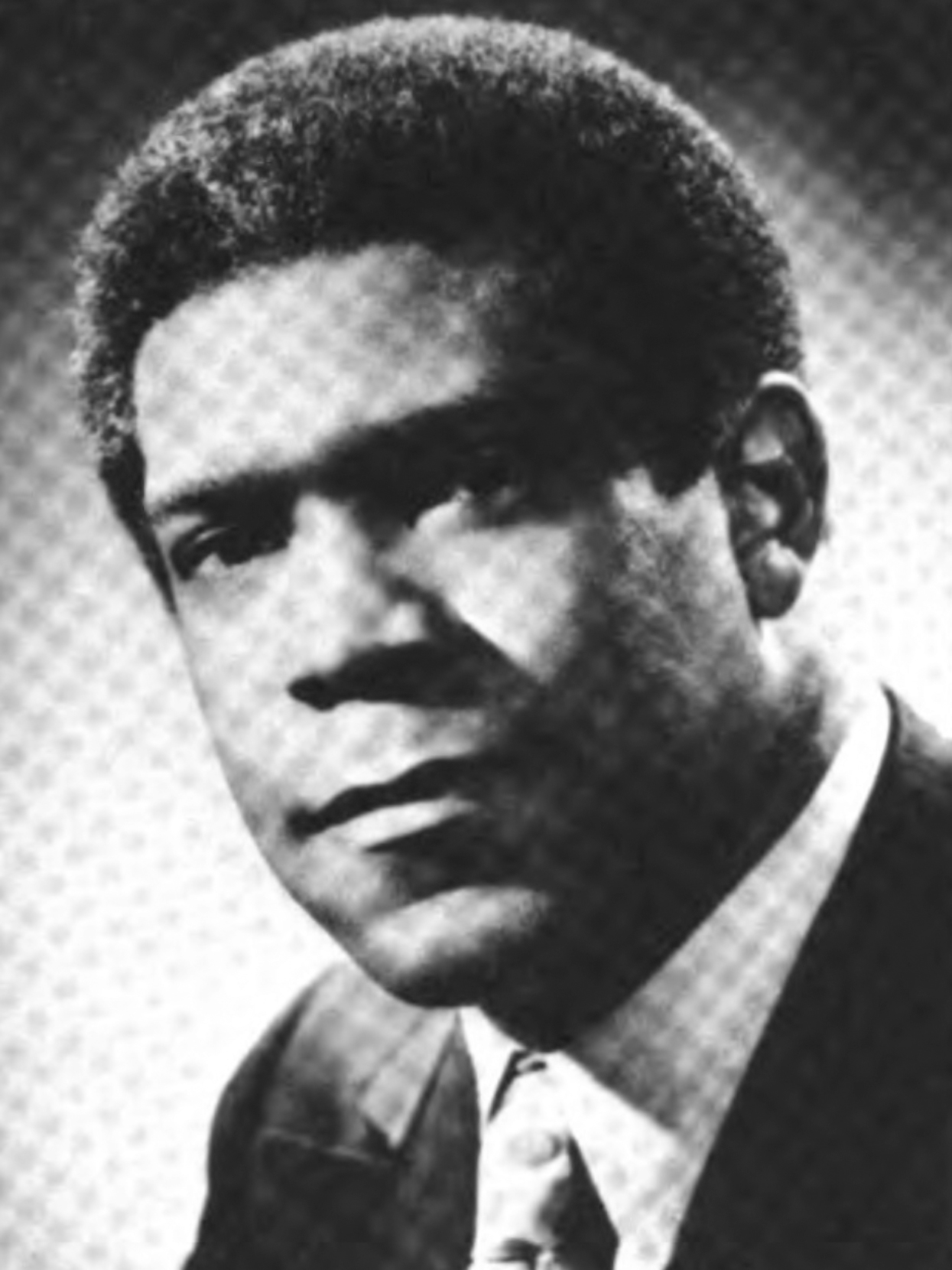
- Official portrait, 1975

Member of the California Senate
- In office December 3, 1984 – November 30, 1992
- Preceded by: Robert G. Beverly
- Succeeded by: Robert G. Beverly
- Constituency: 27th district
- In office April 7, 1975 – November 30, 1984
- Preceded by: Mervyn Dymally
- Succeeded by: Robert G. Beverly
- Constituency: 29th district

Member of the California State Assembly
- In office December 2, 1974 – April 7, 1975
- Preceded by: Frank D. Lanterman
- Succeeded by: Teresa Patterson Hughes
- Constituency: 47th district
- In office January 2, 1967 – November 30, 1974
- Preceded by: Mervyn Dymally
- Succeeded by: Paul Bannai
- Constituency: 53rd district

Personal details
- Born: William Bradshaw Greene Jr. November 15, 1930 Kansas City, Missouri, U.S.
- Died: December 2, 2002 (aged 72) Sacramento, California, U.S.
- Party: Democratic
- Spouse: Yvonne LaFargue
- Children: 2 daughters
- Education: University of Michigan
- Occupation: Politician

Military service
- Branch/service: United States Air Force

William Bradshaw Greene Jr. (November 15, 1930 – December 2, 2002) was an American politician. He served as a Democratic member of the California State Assembly and the California State Senate, representing South Central Los Angeles, Watts, Bell, Compton, Cudahy, Huntington Park and South Gate for twenty-five years.

== Early life ==
Greene was born on November 15, 1930, in Kansas City, Missouri.

Greene attended the University of Michigan. During the Civil Rights Movement, he demonstrated alongside Julian Bond, Stokely Carmichael and James Farmer, and he was jailed in Mississippi and Louisiana for his activism.

== Career ==
Greene started his career as an assistant to Jesse M. Unruh. He was the first African American to work as an assistant in the California State Assembly. He was also a lobbyist for the Service Employees International Union.

Greene served as a Democratic member of the California State Assembly from 1967 to 1975. He served as a member of the California State Senate from 1975 to 1992. He succeeded Mervyn M. Dymally, another African-American politician, in both houses. In the Senate, he represented "South-Central Los Angeles, Watts, Bell, Compton, Cudahy, Huntington Park and South Gate". He served as the chairman of the Senate Industrial Relations Committee. However, in 1989-1991, he "missed more than 50% of Senate votes" due to poor health, which led to his retirement.

The Bill Greene Sports Complex in Cudahy was named in his honor in 1991.

== Personal life ==
Greene married Yvonne LaFargue. They had two daughters, Alisa Rochelle and Jan Andrea.

== Death ==
Greene died on December 2, 2002, at the Kaiser South Sacramento Medical Center in Sacramento, California.
