= California's 52nd State Assembly district =

American legislative district

Current assemblymember
Jessica Caloza; D–Los Angeles
- Population (2010) • Voting age • Citizen voting age: 465,678; 329,263; 247,395
- Demographics: 17.22% White; 5.99% Black; 68.08% Latino; 7.42% Asian; 0.38% Native American; 0.25% Hawaiian/Pacific Islander; 0.26% other; 0.40% remainder of multiracial
- Registered voters: 188,280
- Registration: 48.10% Democratic; 21.99% Republican; 24.71% No party preference

California's 52nd State Assembly district is one of 80 California State Assembly districts. It is currently represented by Democrat Jessica Caloza.

== District profile ==
After being redrawn in 2020, the district encompasses the Los Angeles County communities of Angelino Heights, Atwater Village, City Terrace, Cypress Park, Eagle Rock, East Hollywood, East Los Angeles, Echo Park, El Sereno, Elysian Heights, Glassell Park, Garvanza, Highland Park, Hillside Village, Lincoln Heights, Montecito Heights, Monterey Hills, Mount Washington, Silver Lake, South Glendale, and University Hills.

== Election results from statewide races ==
Year	Office	Results
2021	Recall	No 62.7 – 37.3%
2020	President	Biden 63.9 – 33.8%
2018	Governor	Newsom 64.1 – 35.9%
2018	Senator	Feinstein 51.1 – 48.9%
2016	President	Clinton 65.8 – 28.7%
2016	Senator	Harris 51.8 – 48.2%
2014	Governor	Brown 58.6 – 41.4%
2012	President	Obama 65.0 – 32.9%
2012	Senator	Feinstein 65.7 – 34.3%

== List of assembly members representing the district ==
Due to redistricting, the 52nd district has been moved around different parts of the state. The current iteration resulted from the 2021 redistricting by the California Citizens Redistricting Commission.

Assembly members	Party	Years served	Counties represented	Notes
Thomas Coke Morris	Democratic	January 5, 1885 – January 3, 1887	Alameda	
John Ellsworth	Republican	January 3, 1887 – January 7, 1889	Alameda	
William Simpson	Republican	January 7, 1889 – January 5, 1891	Alameda	
Frederick Bryant	Republican	January 5, 1891 – January 2, 1893	Alameda	
James Thomas O'Keefe	Republican	January 2, 1893 – January 7, 1895	San Mateo	
Timothy Guy Phelps	Republican	January 7, 1895 – January 4, 1897	San Mateo	
S. G. Goodhue	Republican	January 4, 1897 – January 2, 1899	San Mateo	
Henry Ward Brown	Republican	January 2, 1899 – January 5, 1903	San Mateo	
William H. Waste	Republican	January 5, 1903 – April 13, 1905	Alameda	Resigned to become a Judge for the Alameda County Superior Court.
Vacant		April 13, 1905 – January 7, 1907	Alameda	
John M. Eshleman	Republican	January 7, 1907 – January 4, 1909	Alameda	
C. C. Young	Republican	January 4, 1909 – January 6, 1913	Alameda	
Leonard B. Cary	Republican	January 6, 1913 – January 8, 1917	Fresno	Ran as a Progressive during his 2nd term and won.
Leonard B. Cary	Progressive	January 6, 1913 – January 8, 1917	Fresno	Ran as a Progressive during his 2nd term and won.
Melvin Pettit	Progressive	January 8, 1917 – January 3, 1921	Fresno	Changed his party to Democratic when he ran for his 2nd term.
Melvin Pettit	Democratic	January 8, 1917 – January 3, 1921	Fresno	Changed his party to Democratic when he ran for his 2nd term.
S. L. Heisinger	Democratic	January 3, 1921 – January 5, 1931	Fresno	
Eleanor Miller	Republican	January 5, 1931 – January 2, 1933	Los Angeles	
Charles W. Grubbs	Democratic	January 2, 1933 – January 7, 1935	Los Angeles	
Ben Rosenthal	Democratic	January 7, 1935 – May 29, 1940	Los Angeles	Resigns to become a judge for the Los Angeles Municipal Court.
Vacant		May 29, 1940 – January 6, 1941	Los Angeles	
William H. Poole	Democratic	January 6, 1941 – January 4, 1943	Los Angeles	
Jonathan J. Hollibaugh	Republican	January 4, 1943 – June 11, 1953	Los Angeles	Died in office. Dies from a heart attack.
Vacant		June 11, 1953 – December 2, 1953	Los Angeles	
Frank G. Bonelli	Democratic	December 2, 1953 – June 4, 1958	Los Angeles	Sworn in after winning special death to fill vacant seat after Hollibaugh's death. Resigns from the Assembly to become a member of the Los Angeles County Board of Supervisors.
Vacant		June 4, 1958 – January 5, 1959	Los Angeles	
George A. Willson	Democratic	January 5, 1959 – January 2, 1967	Los Angeles	
Floyd L. Wakefield	Republican	January 2, 1967 – November 30, 1974	Los Angeles	
Vincent Thomas	Democratic	December 2, 1974 – November 30, 1978	Los Angeles	
Gerald N. Felando	Republican	December 4, 1978 – November 30, 1982	Los Angeles	
Frank Hill	Republican	December 6, 1982 – April 16, 1990	Los Angeles	Resigned from office after winning special election to be sworn in the 31st State Senate district.
Vacant		April 16, 1990 – December 3, 1990	Los Angeles	
Paul Horcher	Republican	December 3, 1990 – November 30, 1992	Los Angeles	
Willard H. Murray Jr.	Democratic	December 7, 1992 – November 30, 1996	Los Angeles	
Carl Washington	Democratic	December 2, 1996 – November 30, 2002	Los Angeles	
Mervyn Dymally	Democratic	December 2, 2002 – November 30, 2008	Los Angeles	
Isadore Hall III	Democratic	December 1, 2008 – November 30, 2012	Los Angeles	
Norma J. Torres	Democratic	December 3, 2012 – May 20, 2013	Los Angeles, San Bernardino	Resigned from office to be sworn in to the 32nd State Senate district.
Vacant		May 20, 2013 – October 11, 2013	Los Angeles, San Bernardino	
Freddie Rodriguez	Democratic	October 11, 2013 – November 30, 2022	Los Angeles, San Bernardino	Sworn in after winning special election.
Wendy Carrillo	Democratic	December 5, 2022 – November 30, 2024	Los Angeles	
Jessica Caloza	Democratic	December 2, 2024 – present	Los Angeles	

== Election results (1990–present) ==
=== 2024 ===
2024 California State Assembly 52nd district election
Primary election
Party	Candidate	Votes	%
Democratic	Jessica Caloza	23,391	29.8
Democratic	Franky Carrillo	20,569	26.2
Republican	Stephen Sills	10,082	12.8
Democratic	David Girón	9,184	11.7
Democratic	Ari Ruiz	5,832	7.4
Democratic	Carlos J. León	2,628	3.3
Democratic	Genesis Coronado	2,583	3.3
Democratic	Sofia Quinones	2,080	2.6
Green	Shannel Pittman	1,160	1.5
Democratic	Anthony Libertino Fanara	992	1.3
Total votes		78,501	100.0
General election
Democratic	Jessica Caloza	108,882	66.9
Democratic	Franky Carrillo	53,820	33.1
Total votes		162,702	100.0
Democratic hold			

=== 2022 ===
2022 California State Assembly 52nd district election
Primary election
Party	Candidate	Votes	%
Democratic	Wendy Carrillo (incumbent)	43,040	49.2
Democratic	Mia Livas Porter	33,889	38.7
Republican	Gia D'Amato	10,541	12.1
Total votes		87,470	100.0
General election
Democratic	Wendy Carrillo (incumbent)	65,039	56.9
Democratic	Mia Livas Porter	49,211	43.1
Total votes		114,250	100.0
Democratic hold			

=== 2020 ===
2020 California State Assembly 52nd district election
Primary election
Party	Candidate	Votes	%
Democratic	Freddie Rodriguez (incumbent)	47,539	68.8
Republican	Toni Holle	21,499	31.1
Democratic	Jesus Gonzales (write-in)	18	0.0
Total votes		69,038	100.0
General election
Democratic	Freddie Rodriguez (incumbent)	112,165	68.3
Republican	Toni Holle	52,022	31.7
Total votes		164,187	100.0
Democratic hold			

=== 2018 ===
2018 California State Assembly 52nd district election
Primary election
Party	Candidate	Votes	%
Democratic	Freddie Rodriguez (incumbent)	21,736	48.0
Republican	Toni Holle	16,087	35.5
Democratic	Frank C. Guzman	6,297	13.9
Libertarian	Ben W. Gibbons	1,205	2.7
Total votes		45,325	100.0
General election
Democratic	Freddie Rodriguez (incumbent)	70,507	68.6
Republican	Toni Holle	32,273	31.4
Total votes		102,780	100.0
Democratic hold			

=== 2016 ===
2016 California State Assembly 52nd district election
Primary election
Party	Candidate	Votes	%
Democratic	Freddie Rodriguez (incumbent)	33,830	63.9
Democratic	Paul Vincent Avila	18,943	35.8
Republican	Toni Holle (write-in)	196	0.4
Total votes		52,969	100.0
General election
Democratic	Freddie Rodriguez (incumbent)	64,836	59.1
Democratic	Paul Vincent Avila	44,865	40.9
Total votes		109,701	100.0
Democratic hold			

=== 2014 ===
2014 California State Assembly 52nd district election
Primary election
Party	Candidate	Votes	%
Democratic	Freddie Rodriguez (incumbent)	11,543	55.2
Republican	Dorothy F. Pineda	9,368	44.8
Total votes		20,911	100.0
General election
Democratic	Freddie Rodriguez (incumbent)	27,877	58.9
Republican	Dorothy F. Pineda	19,470	41.1
Total votes		47,347	100.0
Democratic hold			

=== 2013 (special) ===
2013 California State Assembly 52nd district special election Vacancy resulting from the resignation of Norma Torres
Primary election
Party	Candidate	Votes	%
No party preference	Paul S. Leon	4,219	24.9
Democratic	Freddie Rodriguez	3,758	22.2
Republican	Dorothy F. Pineda	2,453	14.5
Democratic	Jason A. Rothman	1,545	9.1
Democratic	Tom Haughey	1,482	8.7
Democratic	Danielle Soto	1,259	7.4
Democratic	Doris Louise Wallace	887	5.2
Democratic	Paul Vincent Avila	752	4.4
Democratic	Manuel Saucedo	597	3.5
Total votes		16,952	100.0
General election
Democratic	Freddie Rodriguez	7,630	51.3
No party preference	Paul S. Leon	7,230	48.7
Total votes		14,860	100.0
Democratic hold			

=== 2012 ===
2012 California State Assembly 52nd district election
Primary election
Party	Candidate	Votes	%
Democratic	Norma Torres (incumbent)	10,851	41.8
Republican	Kenny Coble	9,729	37.5
Democratic	Paul Vincent Avila	3,417	13.2
Democratic	Ray Moors	1,969	7.6
Total votes		25,966	100.0
General election
Democratic	Norma Torres (incumbent)	66,565	66.0
Republican	Kenny Coble	34,267	34.0
Total votes		100,832	100.0
Democratic hold			

=== 2010 ===
2010 California State Assembly 52nd district election
Party	Candidate	Votes	%
Democratic	Isadore Hall, III (incumbent)	48,323	88.3
Republican	Gwen Patrick	6,399	11.7
Total votes		54,722	100.0
Democratic hold			

=== 2008 ===
2008 California State Assembly 52nd district election
Party	Candidate	Votes	%
Democratic	Isadore Hall, III	72,895	86.2
Republican	Gwen Patrick	11,700	13.8
Total votes		84,595	100.0
Democratic hold			

=== 2006 ===
2006 California State Assembly 52nd district election
Party	Candidate	Votes	%
Democratic	Mervyn Dymally (incumbent)	37,959	100.0
Total votes		37,959	100.0
Democratic hold			

=== 2004 ===
2004 California State Assembly 52nd district election
Party	Candidate	Votes	%
Democratic	Mervyn M. Dymally (incumbent)	59,923	100.0
Total votes		59,923	100.0
Democratic hold			

=== 2002 ===
2002 California State Assembly 52nd district election
Party	Candidate	Votes	%
Democratic	Mervyn M. Dymally	36,282	89.6
Republican	Mark Anthony Iles	4,244	10.4
Total votes		40,506	100.0
Democratic hold			

=== 2000 ===
2000 California State Assembly 52nd district election
Party	Candidate	Votes	%
Democratic	Carl Washington (incumbent)	61,382	87.2
Republican	Mark Anthony Iles	9,047	12.8
Total votes		70,429	100.0
Democratic hold			

=== 1998 ===
1998 California State Assembly 52nd district election
Party	Candidate	Votes	%
Democratic	Carl Washington (incumbent)	45,742	100.0
Total votes		45,742	100.0
Democratic hold			

=== 1996 ===
1996 California State Assembly 52nd district election
Party	Candidate	Votes	%
Democratic	Carl Washington	52,081	84.6
Republican	Robert Pullen-Miles	9,503	15.4
Total votes		61,584	100.0
Democratic hold			

=== 1994 ===
1994 California State Assembly 52nd district election
Party	Candidate	Votes	%
Democratic	Willard H. Murray, Jr. (incumbent)	40,702	80.8
Republican	Richard A. Rorex	9,662	19.2
Total votes		50,364	100.0
Democratic hold			

=== 1992 ===
1992 California State Assembly 52nd district election
Party	Candidate	Votes	%
Democratic	Willard H. Murray, Jr.	57,588	100.0
Total votes		57,588	100.0
Democratic gain from Republican			

=== 1990 ===
1990 California State Assembly 52nd district election
Party	Candidate	Votes	%
Republican	Paul Horcher	45,264	58.9
Democratic	Gary L. Neely	31,583	41.1
Total votes		76,847	100.0
Republican hold			

== See also ==
- California State Assembly
- California State Assembly districts
- Districts in California
