= 2004 California State Assembly election =

- November 2, 2004

All 80 seats in the California State Assembly 41 seats needed for a majority
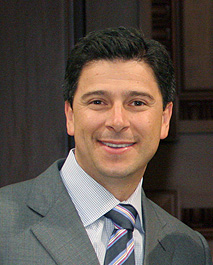

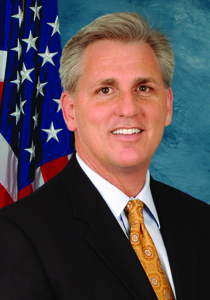
| | Majority party | Minority party |
|---|---|---|
| Leader | Fabian Núñez | Kevin McCarthy |
| Party | Democratic | Republican |
| Leader's seat | 46th–Los Angeles | 32nd–Bakersfield |
| Last election | 48 seats | 32 seats |
| Seats won | 48 | 32 |
| Seat change | Steady | Steady |
| Popular vote | 5,995,046 | 5,044,449 |
| Percentage | 52.61% | 44.26% |
- Democratic hold Republican hold Vote share: 50–60% 60–70% 70–80% 80–90% >90% 40–50% 50–60% 60–70% 70–80%
Speaker before election
Fabian Núñez
Democratic
Elected Speaker
Fabian Núñez
Democratic

The 2004 California State Assembly elections were held on November 2, 2004. California's State Assembly in its entirety comes up for election in even-numbered years. Each seat has a two-year term, and members are limited to three two-year terms (six years). All 80 biennially elected seats in the Assembly were up for election this year.

While some seats were close races, no opposing party challenges to incumbents were successful on either side, and thus, there were no changes to the party balance.

== Overview ==
California State Assembly elections, 2004
| Party | Votes | Percentage | Incumbents | Open | Before | After |
|---|---|---|---|---|---|---|
| Democratic | 5,995,046 | 52.61% | 33 | 15 | 48 | 48 |
| Republican | 5,044,449 | 44.26% | 24 | 8 | 32 | 32 |
| Libertarian | 324,414 | 2.85% | 0 | 0 | 0 | 0 |
| Green | 27,182 | 0.24% | 0 | 0 | 0 | 0 |
| Peace and Freedom | 5,028 | 0.04% | 0 | 0 | 0 | 0 |
| Write-in | 94 | 0.00% | 0 | 0 | 0 | 0 |
| Invalid or blank votes | 486,319 | 6.58% | — | — | — | — |
| Totals | 11,396,213 | 100.00% | 57 | 23 | 80 | 80 |

↓
| 48 | 32 |
| Democratic | Republican |

== Predictions ==
| Source | Ranking | As of |
|---|---|---|
| Rothenberg | Safe D | October 1, 2004 |

== Results ==
Final results from the California Secretary of State:

=== District 1 ===
California's 1st State Assembly district election, 2004
| Party | Candidate | Votes | % |
|---|---|---|---|
| Democratic | Patty Berg (incumbent) | 120,157 | 61.44 |
| Republican | Ray Tyrone | 64,587 | 33.03 |
| Libertarian | Ken Anton | 10,817 | 5.53 |
| Total votes | | 195,561 | 100.00 |
| Democratic hold | | | |

=== District 2 ===
California's 2nd State Assembly district election, 2004
| Party | Candidate | Votes | % |
|---|---|---|---|
| Republican | Doug LaMalfa (incumbent) | 115,651 | 64.87 |
| Democratic | Barbara McIver | 62,643 | 35.13 |
| Total votes | | 178,294 | 100.00 |
| Republican hold | | | |

=== District 3 ===
California's 3rd State Assembly district election, 2004
| Party | Candidate | Votes | % |
|---|---|---|---|
| Republican | Rick Keene (incumbent) | 111,747 | 59.35 |
| Democratic | Robert A. Woods | 70,126 | 37.24 |
| Libertarian | Robert Burk | 6,421 | 3.41 |
| Total votes | | 188,294 | 100.00 |
| Republican hold | | | |

=== District 4 ===
California's 4th State Assembly district election, 2004
| Party | Candidate | Votes | % |
|---|---|---|---|
| Republican | Tim Leslie (incumbent) | 140,105 | 66.68 |
| Democratic | Todd W. Schwenk | 70,008 | 33.32 |
| Total votes | | 210,113 | 100.00 |
| Republican hold | | | |

=== District 5 ===
California's 5th State Assembly district election, 2004
| Party | Candidate | Votes | % |
|---|---|---|---|
| Republican | Roger Niello | 104,895 | 60.24 |
| Democratic | Sandra A. Carey | 62,710 | 36.01 |
| Libertarian | Melissa Manfre | 6,524 | 3.75 |
| Total votes | | 174,129 | 100.00 |
| Republican hold | | | |

=== District 6 ===
California's 6th State Assembly district election, 2004
| Party | Candidate | Votes | % |
|---|---|---|---|
| Democratic | Joe Nation (incumbent) | 148,556 | 72.51 |
| Republican | Carolyn F. Patrick | 56,311 | 27.49 |
| Total votes | | 204,867 | 100.00 |
| Democratic hold | | | |

=== District 7 ===
California's 7th State Assembly district election, 2004
| Party | Candidate | Votes | % |
|---|---|---|---|
| Democratic | Noreen M. Evans | 101,130 | 60.12 |
| Republican | Pat Krueger | 62,035 | 36.88 |
| Republican | F. Aaron Smith | 5,051 | 3.00 |
| Total votes | | 168,216 | 100.00 |
| Democratic hold | | | |

=== District 8 ===
California's 8th State Assembly district election, 2004
| Party | Candidate | Votes | % |
|---|---|---|---|
| Democratic | Lois Wolk (incumbent) | 101,171 | 62.83 |
| Republican | John R. Munn | 59,842 | 37.17 |
| Total votes | | 161,013 | 100.00 |
| Democratic hold | | | |

=== District 9 ===
California's 9th State Assembly district election, 2004
| Party | Candidate | Votes | % |
|---|---|---|---|
| Democratic | Dave Jones | 77,880 | 66.73 |
| Republican | Gaspar Garcia | 32,734 | 28.05 |
| Libertarian | Gale Morgan | 6,098 | 5.22 |
| Total votes | | 116,712 | 100.00 |
| Democratic hold | | | |

=== District 10 ===
California's 10th State Assembly district election, 2004
| Party | Candidate | Votes | % |
|---|---|---|---|
| Republican | Alan Nakanishi (incumbent) | 121,741 | 75.64 |
| Libertarian | Cullene Lang | 39,208 | 24.36 |
| Total votes | | 160,949 | 100.00 |
| Republican hold | | | |

=== District 11 ===
California's 11th State Assembly district election, 2004
| Party | Candidate | Votes | % |
|---|---|---|---|
| Democratic | Joe Canciamilla (incumbent) | 95,912 | 66.83 |
| Republican | Paul Santiago | 40,438 | 28.18 |
| Libertarian | Frank Manske | 7,162 | 4.99 |
| Total votes | | 143,512 | 100.00 |
| Democratic hold | | | |

=== District 12 ===
California's 12th State Assembly district election, 2004
| Party | Candidate | Votes | % |
|---|---|---|---|
| Democratic | Leland Yee (incumbent) | 112,000 | 77.58 |
| Republican | Howard Epstein | 23,803 | 16.49 |
| Libertarian | Chris Maden | 8,560 | 5.93 |
| Total votes | | 144,363 | 100.00 |
| Democratic hold | | | |

=== District 13 ===
California's 13th State Assembly district election, 2004
| Party | Candidate | Votes | % |
|---|---|---|---|
| Democratic | Mark Leno (incumbent) | 148,863 | 81.91 |
| Republican | Gail E. Neira | 23,900 | 13.15 |
| Libertarian | Jonathan Scott Marvin | 8,980 | 4.94 |
| Total votes | | 181,743 | 100.00 |
| Democratic hold | | | |

=== District 14 ===
California's 14th State Assembly district election, 2004
| Party | Candidate | Votes | % |
|---|---|---|---|
| Democratic | Loni Hancock (incumbent) | 141,184 | 77.43 |
| Republican | Lance Montauk | 32,531 | 17.84 |
| Libertarian | Kevin O'Neal | 8,632 | 4.73 |
| Total votes | | 182,347 | 100.00 |
| Democratic hold | | | |

=== District 15 ===
California's 15th State Assembly district election, 2004
| Party | Candidate | Votes | % |
|---|---|---|---|
| Republican | Guy Houston (incumbent) | 113,079 | 55.22 |
| Democratic | Elaine D. Shaw | 91,709 | 44.78 |
| Total votes | | 204,788 | 100.00 |
| Republican hold | | | |

=== District 16 ===
California's 16th State Assembly district election, 2004
| Party | Candidate | Votes | % |
|---|---|---|---|
| Democratic | Wilma Chan (incumbent) | 126,292 | 88.20 |
| Republican | Jerald Udinsky | 16,903 | 11.80 |
| Total votes | | 143,195 | 100.00 |
| Democratic hold | | | |

=== District 17 ===
California's 17th State Assembly district election, 2004
| Party | Candidate | Votes | % |
|---|---|---|---|
| Democratic | Barbara S. Matthews (inc.) | 66,926 | 60.52 |
| Republican | Nellie McGarry | 43,664 | 39.48 |
| No party | Jennet C. Stebbins (write-in) | 2 | 0.00 |
| Total votes | | 110,592 | 100.00 |
| Democratic hold | | | |

=== District 18 ===
California's 18th State Assembly district election, 2004
| Party | Candidate | Votes | % |
|---|---|---|---|
| Democratic | Johan Klehs (incumbent) | 106,635 | 83.61 |
| Libertarian | Ronald J. Colfer | 20,888 | 16.38 |
| No party | Lou Filipovich (write-in) | 17 | 0.00 |
| Total votes | | 127,540 | 100.00 |
| Democratic hold | | | |

=== District 19 ===
California's 19th State Assembly district election, 2004
| Party | Candidate | Votes | % |
|---|---|---|---|
| Democratic | Gene Mullin (incumbent) | 114,277 | 71.31 |
| Republican | Catherine Brinkman | 41,513 | 25.90 |
| Libertarian | Miles C. Gilster | 4,465 | 2.79 |
| Total votes | | 160,255 | 100.00 |
| Democratic hold | | | |

=== District 20 ===
California's 20th State Assembly district election, 2004
| Party | Candidate | Votes | % |
|---|---|---|---|
| Democratic | Alberto Torrico | 87,724 | 68.62 |
| Republican | Cliff Williams | 40,114 | 31.38 |
| Total votes | | 127,838 | 100.00 |
| Democratic hold | | | |

=== District 21 ===
California's 21st State Assembly district election, 2004
| Party | Candidate | Votes | % |
|---|---|---|---|
| Democratic | Ira Ruskin | 98,002 | 51.55 |
| Republican | Steve Poizner | 92,118 | 48.45 |
| Total votes | | 190,120 | 100.00 |
| Democratic hold | | | |

=== District 22 ===
California's 22nd State Assembly district election, 2004
| Party | Candidate | Votes | % |
|---|---|---|---|
| Democratic | Sally Lieber (incumbent) | 91,561 | 70.27 |
| Republican | Marie Dominguez-Gasson | 38,746 | 29.73 |
| Total votes | | 130,307 | 100.00 |
| Democratic hold | | | |

=== District 23 ===
California's 23rd State Assembly district election, 2004
| Party | Candidate | Votes | % |
|---|---|---|---|
| Democratic | Joe Coto | 62,569 | 67.12 |
| Republican | Mark Patrosso | 26,051 | 27.95 |
| Green | Warner S. Bloomberg IIi | 4,597 | 4.93 |
| Total votes | | 93,217 | 100.00 |
| Democratic hold | | | |

=== District 24 ===
California's 24th State Assembly district election, 2004
| Party | Candidate | Votes | % |
|---|---|---|---|
| Democratic | Rebecca Cohn | 94,152 | 59.40 |
| Republican | Ernie Konnyu | 55,956 | 35.31 |
| Libertarian | Zander Y. Collier, IIi | 8,337 | 5.26 |
| No party | Michael Roy (write-in) | 41 | 0.03 |
| No party | Lawrence R. Hileman (write-in) | 7 | 0.00 |
| Total votes | | 158,493 | 100.00 |
| Democratic hold | | | |

=== District 25 ===
California's 25th State Assembly district election, 2004
| Party | Candidate | Votes | % |
|---|---|---|---|
| Republican | Dave Cogdill (incumbent) | 111,336 | 68.16 |
| Democratic | Bryan Justin Marks | 52,006 | 31.84 |
| Total votes | | 163,342 | 100.00 |
| Republican hold | | | |

=== District 26 ===
California's 26th State Assembly district election, 2004
| Party | Candidate | Votes | % |
|---|---|---|---|
| Republican | Greg Aghazarian (incumbent) | 78,381 | 62.55 |
| Democratic | Tim Weintz, Sr. | 46,924 | 37.45 |
| Total votes | | 125,305 | 100.00 |
| Republican hold | | | |

=== District 27 ===
California's 27th State Assembly district election, 2004
| Party | Candidate | Votes | % |
|---|---|---|---|
| Democratic | John Laird (incumbent) | 129,410 | 68.66 |
| Republican | Jack D. Barlich | 59,076 | 31.34 |
| Total votes | | 188,486 | 100.00 |
| Democratic hold | | | |

=== District 28 ===
California's 28th State Assembly district election, 2004
| Party | Candidate | Votes | % |
|---|---|---|---|
| Democratic | Simon Salinas (incumbent) | 67,586 | 63.26 |
| Republican | Bob Perkins | 39,257 | 36.74 |
| Total votes | | 106,843 | 100.00 |
| Democratic hold | | | |

=== District 29 ===
California's 29th State Assembly district election, 2004
| Party | Candidate | Votes | % |
|---|---|---|---|
| Republican | Mike Villines (incumbent) | 95,209 | 62.35 |
| Democratic | Michael R. Macias | 52,334 | 34.27 |
| Green | John Crockford | 5,150 | 3.37 |
| Total votes | | 152,693 | 100.00 |
| Republican hold | | | |

=== District 30 ===
California's 30th State Assembly district election, 2004
| Party | Candidate | Votes | % |
|---|---|---|---|
| Democratic | Nicole Parra (incumbent) | 42,953 | 55.04 |
| Republican | Dean Gardner | 35,084 | 44.96 |
| Total votes | | 78,037 | 100.00 |
| Democratic hold | | | |

=== District 31 ===
California's 31st State Assembly district election, 2004
| Party | Candidate | Votes | % |
|---|---|---|---|
| Democratic | Juan Arambula (incumbent) | 49,738 | 57.68 |
| Republican | Paul Betancourt | 36,496 | 42.32 |
| Total votes | | 86,234 | 100.00 |
| Democratic hold | | | |

=== District 32 ===
California's 32nd State Assembly district election, 2004
| Party | Candidate | Votes | % |
|---|---|---|---|
| Republican | Kevin McCarthy | 129,510 | 78.66 |
| Democratic | Marvin Armas | 35,130 | 21.34 |
| Total votes | | 164,640 | 100.00 |
| Republican hold | | | |

=== District 33 ===
California's 33rd State Assembly district election, 2004
| Party | Candidate | Votes | % |
|---|---|---|---|
| Republican | Sam Blakeslee (incumbent) | 99,864 | 56.27 |
| Democratic | Stew Jenkins | 57,673 | 32.50 |
| Green | Tom Hutchings | 10,422 | 5.87 |
| Libertarian | Gary L. Kirkland | 9,502 | 5.35 |
| Total votes | | 177,461 | 100.00 |
| Republican hold | | | |

=== District 34 ===
California's 34th State Assembly district election, 2004
| Party | Candidate | Votes | % |
|---|---|---|---|
| Republican | Bill Maze (incumbent) | 80,149 | 68.52 |
| Democratic | Maggie Florez | 36,819 | 31.48 |
| Total votes | | 116,968 | 100.00 |
| Republican hold | | | |

=== District 35 ===
California's 35th State Assembly district election, 2004
| Party | Candidate | Votes | % |
|---|---|---|---|
| Democratic | Pedro Nava (incumbent) | 91,503 | 52.73 |
| Republican | Bob Pohl | 82,025 | 47.27 |
| Total votes | | 173,528 | 100.00 |
| Democratic hold | | | |

=== District 36 ===
California's 36th State Assembly district election, 2004
| Party | Candidate | Votes | % |
|---|---|---|---|
| Republican | Sharon Runner (incumbent) | 89,365 | 66.22 |
| Democratic | Hotron Scioneaux | 45,595 | 33.78 |
| Total votes | | 134,960 | 100.00 |
| Republican hold | | | |

=== District 37 ===
California's 37th State Assembly district election, 2004
| Party | Candidate | Votes | % |
|---|---|---|---|
| Republican | Audra Strickland | 100,309 | 55.09 |
| Democratic | Ferial Masry | 74,774 | 41.06 |
| Green | Adrienne M. Prince | 7,013 | 3.85 |
| Total votes | | 182,096 | 100.00 |
| Republican hold | | | |

=== District 38 ===
California's 38th State Assembly district election, 2004
| Party | Candidate | Votes | % |
|---|---|---|---|
| Republican | Keith Richman (incumbent) | 106,834 | 61.19 |
| Democratic | Brian Joseph Davis | 67,747 | 38.81 |
| Total votes | | 174,581 | 100.00 |
| Republican hold | | | |

=== District 39 ===
California's 39th State Assembly district election, 2004
| Party | Candidate | Votes | % |
|---|---|---|---|
| Democratic | Cindy Montañez (incumbent) | 56,017 | 76.79 |
| Republican | Ely De La Cruz Ayao | 16,936 | 23.21 |
| Total votes | | 72,953 | 100.00 |
| Democratic hold | | | |

=== District 40 ===
California's 40th State Assembly district election, 2004
| Party | Candidate | Votes | % |
|---|---|---|---|
| Democratic | Lloyd E. Levine (incumbent) | 69,421 | 57.97 |
| Republican | Mark Isler | 50,323 | 42.03 |
| Total votes | | 119,744 | 100.00 |
| Democratic hold | | | |

=== District 41 ===
California's 41st State Assembly district election, 2004
| Party | Candidate | Votes | % |
|---|---|---|---|
| Democratic | Fran Pavley (incumbent) | 106,761 | 59.70 |
| Republican | Heather Peters | 64,029 | 35.81 |
| Libertarian | Richard P. Koffler | 8,033 | 4.49 |
| Total votes | | 178,823 | 100.00 |
| Democratic hold | | | |

=== District 42 ===
California's 42nd State Assembly district election, 2004
| Party | Candidate | Votes | % |
|---|---|---|---|
| Democratic | Paul Koretz (incumbent) | 143,376 | 75.42 |
| Republican | Paul Morgan Fredrix | 46,715 | 24.58 |
| Total votes | | 190,091 | 100.00 |
| Democratic hold | | | |

=== District 43 ===
California's 43rd State Assembly district election, 2004
| Party | Candidate | Votes | % |
|---|---|---|---|
| Democratic | Dario Frommer (incumbent) | 94,149 | 76.57 |
| Libertarian | Sandor J. Woren | 28,805 | 23.43 |
| Total votes | | 122,954 | 100.00 |
| Democratic hold | | | |

=== District 44 ===
California's 44th State Assembly district election, 2004
| Party | Candidate | Votes | % |
|---|---|---|---|
| Democratic | Carol Liu (incumbent) | 106,179 | 65.61 |
| Republican | Lynn Gabriel | 55,655 | 34.39 |
| Total votes | | 161,834 | 100.00 |
| Democratic hold | | | |

=== District 45 ===
California's 45th State Assembly district election, 2004
| Party | Candidate | Votes | % |
|---|---|---|---|
| Democratic | Jackie Goldberg (incumbent) | 62,091 | 75.95 |
| Republican | Oscar A. Gutierrez | 19,660 | 24.05 |
| Total votes | | 81,751 | 100.00 |
| Democratic hold | | | |

=== District 46 ===
California's 46th State Assembly district election, 2004
| Party | Candidate | Votes | % |
|---|---|---|---|
| Democratic | Fabian Núñez (incumbent) | 44,570 | 85.05 |
| Republican | Manuel "Manny" Aldana, Jr. | 7,837 | 14.95 |
| Total votes | | 52,407 | 100.00 |
| Democratic hold | | | |

=== District 47 ===
California's 47th State Assembly district election, 2004
| Party | Candidate | Votes | % |
|---|---|---|---|
| Democratic | Karen Bass (incumbent) | 118,495 | 80.77 |
| Republican | Dale V. Everett | 21,485 | 14.64 |
| Libertarian | Peter "Pedro" De Baets | 6,730 | 4.59 |
| Total votes | | 146,710 | 100.00 |
| Democratic hold | | | |

=== District 48 ===
California's 48th State Assembly district election, 2004
| Party | Candidate | Votes | % |
|---|---|---|---|
| Democratic | Mark Ridley-Thomas (incumbent) | 68,289 | 89.12 |
| Republican | Sebastian Alexander | 8,333 | 10.88 |
| Total votes | | 76,622 | 100.00 |
| Democratic hold | | | |

=== District 49 ===
California's 49th State Assembly district election, 2004
| Party | Candidate | Votes | % |
|---|---|---|---|
| Democratic | Judy Chu (incumbent) | 62,075 | 65.78 |
| Republican | Sandra L. Needs | 23,927 | 25.36 |
| Libertarian | Laura Brown | 8,363 | 8.86 |
| Total votes | | 94,365 | 100.00 |
| Democratic hold | | | |

=== District 50 ===
California's 50th State Assembly district election, 2004
| Party | Candidate | Votes | % |
|---|---|---|---|
| Democratic | Hector De La Torre | 56,827 | 74.85 |
| Republican | Gladys O. Miller | 19,091 | 25.15 |
| Total votes | | 75,918 | 100.00 |
| Democratic hold | | | |

=== District 51 ===
California's 51st State Assembly district election, 2004
| Party | Candidate | Votes | % |
|---|---|---|---|
| Democratic | Jerome Horton (incumbent) | 89,509 | 84.09 |
| Libertarian | Daniel R. Sherman | 16,941 | 15.91 |
| Total votes | | 106,450 | 100.00 |
| Democratic hold | | | |

=== District 52 ===
California's 52nd State Assembly district election, 2004
| Party | Candidate | Votes | % |
|---|---|---|---|
| Democratic | Mervyn M. Dymally (incumbent) | 59,923 | 100.00 |
| Democratic hold | | | |

=== District 53 ===
California's 53rd State Assembly district election, 2004
| Party | Candidate | Votes | % |
|---|---|---|---|
| Democratic | Mike Gordon | 95,156 | 50.45 |
| Republican | Greg Hill | 79,505 | 42.15 |
| Libertarian | Ethan M. Boivie | 8,942 | 4.74 |
| Peace and Freedom | James R. Smith | 5,028 | 2.67 |
| Total votes | | 188,631 | 100.00 |
| Democratic hold | | | |

=== District 54 ===
California's 54th State Assembly district election, 2004
| Party | Candidate | Votes | % |
|---|---|---|---|
| Democratic | Betty Karnette | 89,987 | 53.49 |
| Republican | Steven T. Kuykendall | 73,701 | 43.81 |
| Libertarian | John Howard Sterne | 4,544 | 2.70 |
| Total votes | | 168,232 | 100.00 |
| Democratic hold | | | |

=== District 55 ===
California's 55th State Assembly district election, 2004
| Party | Candidate | Votes | % |
|---|---|---|---|
| Democratic | Jenny Oropeza (incumbent) | 73,594 | 66.66 |
| Republican | Margherita Palumbo Underhill | 36,800 | 33.34 |
| Total votes | | 110,394 | 100.00 |
| Democratic hold | | | |

=== District 56 ===
California's 56th State Assembly district election, 2004
| Party | Candidate | Votes | % |
|---|---|---|---|
| Democratic | Rudy Bermudez (incumbent) | 67,294 | 60.16 |
| Republican | John Brantuk | 44,559 | 39.84 |
| Total votes | | 111,853 | 100.00 |
| Democratic hold | | | |

=== District 57 ===
California's 57th State Assembly district election, 2004
| Party | Candidate | Votes | % |
|---|---|---|---|
| Democratic | Ed Chavez (incumbent) | 72,860 | 68.51 |
| Republican | Victor M. Valenzuela, Jr. | 33,494 | 31.49 |
| Total votes | | 106,354 | 100.00 |
| Democratic hold | | | |

=== District 58 ===
California's 58th State Assembly district election, 2004
| Party | Candidate | Votes | % |
|---|---|---|---|
| Democratic | Ronald S. Calderon (incumbent) | 71,233 | 61.90 |
| Republican | Rita Topalian | 43,839 | 38.10 |
| Total votes | | 115,072 | 100.00 |
| Democratic hold | | | |

=== District 59 ===
California's 59th State Assembly district election, 2004
| Party | Candidate | Votes | % |
|---|---|---|---|
| Republican | Dennis L. Mountjoy (incumbent) | 99,381 | 58.22 |
| Democratic | Dan Harden | 64,375 | 37.71 |
| Libertarian | Fritz R. Ward | 6,937 | 4.06 |
| Total votes | | 170,693 | 100.00 |
| Republican hold | | | |

=== District 60 ===
California's 60th State Assembly district election, 2004
| Party | Candidate | Votes | % |
|---|---|---|---|
| Republican | Robert "Bob" Huff (incumbent) | 105,334 | 66.54 |
| Democratic | Patrick John Martinez | 52,969 | 33.46 |
| Total votes | | 158,303 | 100.00 |
| Republican hold | | | |

=== District 61 ===
California's 61st State Assembly district election, 2004
| Party | Candidate | Votes | % |
|---|---|---|---|
| Democratic | Gloria Negrete McLeod (incumbent) | 58,120 | 63.59 |
| Republican | Alan Wapner | 33,281 | 36.41 |
| Total votes | | 91,401 | 100.00 |
| Democratic hold | | | |

=== District 62 ===
California's 62nd State Assembly district election, 2004
| Party | Candidate | Votes | % |
|---|---|---|---|
| Democratic | Joe Baca, Jr. (incumbent) | 51,407 | 64.57 |
| Republican | Marge Mendoza-Ware | 28,210 | 35.43 |
| Total votes | | 79,617 | 100.00 |
| Democratic hold | | | |

=== District 63 ===
California's 63rd State Assembly district election, 2004
| Party | Candidate | Votes | % |
|---|---|---|---|
| Republican | Bill Emmerson | 83,719 | 58.26 |
| Democratic | D'Andre McNamee | 49,646 | 34.55 |
| Libertarian | Maureen K. Keedy | 10,334 | 7.19 |
| Total votes | | 143,699 | 100.00 |
| Republican hold | | | |

=== District 64 ===
California's 64th State Assembly district election, 2004
| Party | Candidate | Votes | % |
|---|---|---|---|
| Republican | John J. Benoit (incumbent) | 96,606 | 61.25 |
| Democratic | Robert Melsh | 61,120 | 38.75 |
| Total votes | | 157,726 | 100.00 |
| Republican hold | | | |

=== District 65 ===
California's 65th State Assembly district election, 2004
| Party | Candidate | Votes | % |
|---|---|---|---|
| Republican | Russ Bogh (incumbent) | 93,676 | 61.58 |
| Democratic | Rita Ramirez-Dean | 58,454 | 38.42 |
| Total votes | | 152,130 | 100.00 |
| Republican hold | | | |

=== District 66 ===
California's 66th State Assembly district election, 2004
| Party | Candidate | Votes | % |
|---|---|---|---|
| Republican | Ray Haynes (incumbent) | 91,606 | 61.58 |
| Democratic | Laurel Nicholson | 53,481 | 35.95 |
| Libertarian | Jack N. Lee | 3,671 | 2.47 |
| Total votes | | 148,758 | 100.00 |
| Republican hold | | | |

=== District 67 ===
California's 67th State Assembly district election, 2004
| Party | Candidate | Votes | % |
|---|---|---|---|
| Republican | Tom Harman (incumbent) | 107,847 | 63.90 |
| Democratic | David Silva | 50,430 | 29.88 |
| Libertarian | Norm "Firecracker" Westwell | 10,496 | 6.22 |
| Total votes | | 168,773 | 100.00 |
| Republican hold | | | |

=== District 68 ===
California's 68th State Assembly district election, 2004
| Party | Candidate | Votes | % |
|---|---|---|---|
| Republican | Van Tran | 78,606 | 60.91 |
| Democratic | Al Snook | 50,453 | 39.09 |
| Total votes | | 129,059 | 100.00 |
| Republican hold | | | |

=== District 69 ===
California's 69th State Assembly district election, 2004
| Party | Candidate | Votes | % |
|---|---|---|---|
| Democratic | Tom Umberg | 38,516 | 61.33 |
| Republican | Otto Bade | 19,811 | 31.55 |
| Libertarian | George Reis | 4,470 | 7.12 |
| Total votes | | 62,797 | 100.00 |
| Democratic hold | | | |

=== District 70 ===
California's 70th State Assembly district election, 2004
| Party | Candidate | Votes | % |
|---|---|---|---|
| Republican | Chuck DeVore | 112,844 | 61.10 |
| Democratic | Carl Mariz | 65,351 | 35.38 |
| Libertarian | Mark Baldwin | 6,506 | 3.52 |
| Total votes | | 184,701 | 100.00 |
| Republican hold | | | |

=== District 71 ===
California's 71st State Assembly district election, 2004
| Party | Candidate | Votes | % |
|---|---|---|---|
| Republican | Todd Spitzer (incumbent) | 120,657 | 69.07 |
| Democratic | Bea Foster | 54,041 | 30.93 |
| Total votes | | 174,698 | 100.00 |
| Republican hold | | | |

=== District 72 ===
California's 72nd State Assembly district election, 2004
| Party | Candidate | Votes | % |
|---|---|---|---|
| Republican | Lynn Daucher (incumbent) | 90,255 | 65.97 |
| Democratic | Ross W. Johnson | 41,528 | 30.35 |
| Libertarian | Brian Lee Cross | 5,031 | 3.68 |
| Total votes | | 136,814 | 100.00 |
| Republican hold | | | |

=== District 73 ===
California's 73rd State Assembly district election, 2004
| Party | Candidate | Votes | % |
|---|---|---|---|
| Republican | Mimi Walters | 100,328 | 63.06 |
| Democratic | Kathleen Calzada | 50,474 | 31.72 |
| Libertarian | Andrew H. Favor | 8,299 | 5.22 |
| Total votes | | 159,101 | 100.00 |
| Republican hold | | | |

=== District 74 ===
California's 74th State Assembly district election, 2004
| Party | Candidate | Votes | % |
|---|---|---|---|
| Republican | Mark Wyland (incumbent) | 99,348 | 57.46 |
| Democratic | Karen R. Underwood | 68,180 | 39.43 |
| Libertarian | Paul King | 5,372 | 3.11 |
| Total votes | | 172,900 | 100.00 |
| Republican hold | | | |

=== District 75 ===
California's 75th State Assembly district election, 2004
| Party | Candidate | Votes | % |
|---|---|---|---|
| Republican | George A. Plescia (incumbent) | 108,728 | 59.82 |
| Democratic | Karen Heumann | 69,017 | 37.97 |
| Libertarian | Richard J. Senecal | 4,005 | 2.20 |
| Total votes | | 181,750 | 100.00 |
| Republican hold | | | |

=== District 76 ===
California's 76th State Assembly district election, 2004
| Party | Candidate | Votes | % |
|---|---|---|---|
| Democratic | Lori R. Saldana | 93,601 | 54.16 |
| Republican | Tricia Hunter | 71,320 | 41.26 |
| Libertarian | Jennifer Osborne | 7,918 | 4.58 |
| Total votes | | 172,839 | 100.00 |
| Democratic hold | | | |

=== District 77 ===
California's 77th State Assembly district election, 2004
| Party | Candidate | Votes | % |
|---|---|---|---|
| Republican | Jay La Suer (incumbent) | 106,827 | 64.84 |
| Democratic | Christopher R. Larkin | 53,051 | 32.20 |
| Libertarian | Virgil (Randy) Hall Ii | 4,870 | 2.96 |
| Total votes | | 164,748 | 100.00 |
| Republican hold | | | |

=== District 78 ===
California's 78th State Assembly district election, 2004
| Party | Candidate | Votes | % |
|---|---|---|---|
| Republican | Shirley Horton (incumbent) | 76,886 | 49.05 |
| Democratic | Patty Davis | 74,888 | 47.78 |
| Libertarian | Josh Hale | 4,969 | 3.17 |
| Total votes | | 156,743 | 100.00 |
| Republican hold | | | |

=== District 79 ===
California's 79th State Assembly district election, 2004
| Party | Candidate | Votes | % |
|---|---|---|---|
| Democratic | Juan Vargas (incumbent) | 78,565 | 85.23 |
| Libertarian | Eli Wallace Conroe | 13,584 | 14.74 |
| No party | Petra E. Barajas (write-in) | 27 | 0.03 |
| Total votes | | 92,176 | 100.00 |
| Democratic hold | | | |

=== District 80 ===
California's 80th State Assembly district election, 2004
| Party | Candidate | Votes | % |
|---|---|---|---|
| Republican | Bonnie Garcia (incumbent) | 66,880 | 58.63 |
| Democratic | Mary Ann Andreas | 47,194 | 41.37 |
| Total votes | | 114,074 | 100.00 |
| Republican hold | | | |

== See also ==
- California State Senate
- California State Senate elections, 2004
- California State Assembly Districts
- California state elections, 2004
- Districts in California
- Political party strength in California
- Political party strength in U.S. states
