= James Quigley =

James Quigley may refer to:

- James Edward Quigley (1854–1915), Archbishop of Chicago
- James M. Quigley (1918–2011), United States Representative from Pennsylvania
- James L. Quigley, member of the California legislature
- James F. Quigley (1859–1935), American lawyer and politician from New York
- James Quigley (hurler), Irish hurler
