= Nora Campos =

American politician from California

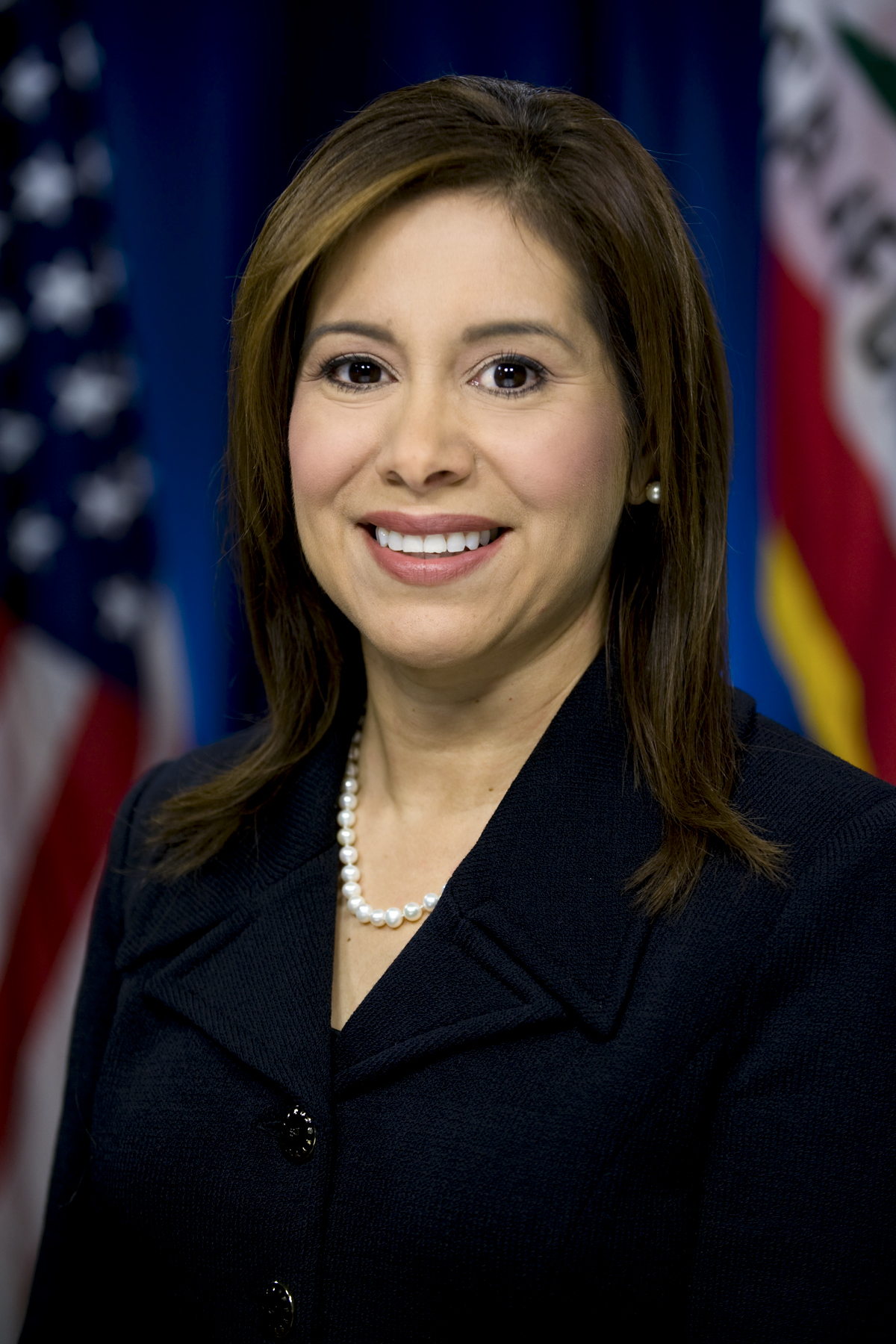

Speaker pro tempore of the California State Assembly
- In office 2013–2014
- Preceded by: Fiona Ma
- Succeeded by: Kevin Mullin

Member of the California State Assembly from the 27th district
- In office December 3, 2012 – November 30, 2016
- Preceded by: Bill Monning
- Succeeded by: Ash Kalra

Member of the California State Assembly from the 23rd district
- In office December 6, 2010 – November 30, 2012
- Preceded by: Joe Coto
- Succeeded by: Jim Patterson

Member of the San Jose City Council from the 5th District
- In office March 13, 2001 – December 6, 2010
- Preceded by: Manny Diaz
- Succeeded by: Xavier Campos

Personal details
- Born: June 15, 1965 (age 61) San Jose, California, U.S.
- Party: Democratic
- Spouse: Neil Struthers
- Children: One
- Education: San Francisco State University
- Occupation: Politician
- Website: noracamposforsenate.com/

Nora Campos (born June 15, 1965) is an American politician from California. Campos formerly served as a California State Assemblymember and was the Speaker pro tempore during her tenure. In 2020, she was unsuccessful in her campaign for the California's 15th State Senate district. She served on the San Jose City Council representing District 5 (2001-2010). She was unsuccessful in her campaign for the same seat in 2022. Prior to taking elected office, she worked for a San Jose City Councilmember.

== Early life and education ==
Nora Campos was raised in the Cassell neighborhood in East San Jose. She marched with and cites her early experience with the Farm Worker Movement as an influence on her decision to enter public service as an adult.

Campos graduated from William C. Overfelt High School in 1983 and earned a Bachelor of Arts degree from San Francisco State University.

== San Jose City Council ==
Campos was elected to represent District 5, representing East San Jose on the San Jose City Council in a special election in March 2001 and served for ten years, winning re-election twice. Campos was elected following the election of Ron Gonzales, the first Latino mayor of San Jose. As a Councilmember, Campos focused on improving opportunities for youth as a counter to gang activities and looked to improve the wages of the working class in San Jose through enforcement of labor laws. She formerly served on the California Commission on the Status of Women and Girls and was a member of the Latino Caucus of the League of California Cities.

== California State Assembly ==
In June 2009, Campos announced her candidacy for the 23rd district of the California State Assembly. She was elected on November 2, 2010, with 75.1% of the vote, succeeding term-limited Democrat Joe Coto. In August 2012, she was appointed speaker pro tempore in the Assembly.

As an assemblywoman, Campos prioritized policies surrounding civil rights. She sponsored a bill that resolved for the federal government to "immediately halt cases it is pursuing against unrepresented immigrant children until lawyers are made available to represent them." In a disappointing turn during the 2015 session, Democratic Governor Brown vetoed Campos' AB 1017, a bill that would have barred employers from using previous salary information to justify paying women less than their male co-workers. The bill was one of two vetoed by Governor Brown that day that targeted gender equity, the other was by fellow Assemblywoman Lorena Gonzalez and addressed gender parity in workers' compensation. In 2016, Campos authored AB 2393 which improved parental leave for all California K-14 employees. It was enrolled into law when Governor Brown signed.

While a State Assemblymember, Campos was chair of the Arts, Entertainment, Sports, Tourism, and Internet Media Committee, and of the Status of Girls and Women of Color Committee. Her committee assignments included Budget Committee, the Business and Professions Committee, the Campus Climate Committee, the Governmental Organization Committee, the Health Committee, the Legislative Budget Committee, the Women in the Workplace Committee, the Environmental Safety and Toxic Materials Committee, the Local Government Committee, and the Water, Parks and Wildlife Committee.

== California State Senate Candidacy ==
In 2016, termed out as an Assemblymember and after advancing in the primary with the endorsement of then-presidential candidate Hillary Clinton, Campos failed to unseat Jim Beall in the election for the 15th State Senate District by a wide margin.

In 2020, Jim Beall termed out of California's 15th State Senate district. Campos was one of seven candidates competing for the open seat; the others were fellow Democrats: former San Jose city council member and termed-out Santa Clara County Supervisor Dave Cortese and UC Berkeley Law School adjunct lecturer Ann Ravel along with Republicans Robert Howell and U.S. Army staff sergeant Ken Del Valle and independents Tim Gildersleeve and termed-out San Jose City Councilman Johnny Khamis. During the campaign, Campos received criticism for receiving aid from oil company including Chevron and a political organizations with ties to similar energy companies that also produce oil and gas.

Campos was defeated in the March 3rd jungle primary by Cortese and Ravel, finishing in third place. Had Campos been successful, she would have been the first Latina/o to hold the 15th State Senate seat (including prior to rezoning the 13th Senate District).

== Election results ==
=== 2010 California State Assembly ===
California's 23rd State Assembly district election, 2010
Party	Candidate	Votes	%
Democratic	Nora Campos	58,629	75.1
Republican	Atul Saini	19,494	24.9
Total votes		78,123	100.0
Democratic hold			

=== 2012 California State Assembly ===
California's 27th State Assembly district election, 2012
Primary election
Party	Candidate	Votes	%
Democratic	Nora Campos (incumbent)	34,217	70.6
Republican	Roger F. Lasson	14,238	29.4
Total votes		48,455	100.0
General election
Democratic	Nora Campos (incumbent)	91,816	77.6
Republican	Roger F. Lasson	26,461	22.4
Total votes		118,277	100.0
Democratic hold			

=== 2014 California State Assembly ===
California's 27th State Assembly district election, 2014
Primary election
Party	Candidate	Votes	%
Democratic	Nora Campos (incumbent)	34,799	69.5
Republican	G. "Burt" Lancaster	15,272	30.5
Total votes		50,071	100.0
General election
Democratic	Nora Campos (incumbent)	49,416	69.4
Republican	G. "Burt" Lancaster	21,779	30.6
Total votes		71,195	100.0
Democratic hold			

=== 2016 California State Senate ===
California's 15th State Senate district election, 2016
Primary election
Party	Candidate	Votes	%
Democratic	Jim Beall (incumbent)	97,948	49.4
Democratic	Nora Campos	53,250	26.9
Republican	Chuck Page	40,783	20.6
Republican	Anthony Macias	6,147	3.1
Total votes		198,128	100.0
General election
Democratic	Jim Beall (incumbent)	196,089	62.5
Democratic	Nora Campos	117,442	37.5
Total votes		313,531	100.0
Democratic hold			

=== 2020 California State Senate ===
2020 California's 15th State Senate district election
Primary election
Party	Candidate	Votes	%
Democratic	Dave Cortese	79,507	33.9
Democratic	Ann Ravel	51,752	22.1
Democratic	Nora Campos	39,683	16.9
Republican	Robert Howell	23,840	10.2
No party preference	Johnny Khamis	23,747	10.1
Republican	Ken Del Valle	14,280	6.1
No party preference	Tim Gildersleeve	1,635	0.7
Total votes		234,444	100.0
General election
Democratic	Dave Cortese	212,207	54.8
Democratic	Ann M. Ravel	175,203	45.2
Total votes		387,410	100.0
Democratic hold			

=== 2022 San Jose City Council District 5 ===
2022 San Jose City Council District 5 election
Party	Candidate	Votes	%
Nonpartisan	Peter Ortiz	8,733	54.83%
Nonpartisan	Nora Campos	7,194	45.17%
Total votes		15,927	100.00

California Assembly
Preceded by Fiona Ma	Speaker pro tempore of the California Assembly; 2013–2014	Succeeded by Kevin Mullin
Preceded by Joe Coto	California State Assemblywoman, 27th District (23rd district 2010–2012); December 6, 2010 - November 30, 2016	Succeeded by Ash Kalra
Political offices
Preceded by Manny Diaz	San Jose City Council Councilwoman, 5th District; March 13, 2001 – December 6, 2010	Succeeded by Xavier Campos
