= California's 24th district =

California's 24th district may refer to:

- California's 24th congressional district
- California's 24th State Assembly district
- California's 24th State Senate district
