= Jim Cunneen =

American politician

Member of the California State Assembly from the 24th district
- In office December 5, 1994 – November 30, 2000
- Preceded by: Chuck Quackenbush
- Succeeded by: Rebecca Cohn

Personal details
- Born: May 24, 1961 (age 65) Stanford, California, U.S.
- Party: Republican
- Education: University of California, Los Angeles (BA)
- Occupation: Politician, Corporate strategist

James Cunneen is an American politician from the state of California.

Cunneen served as an aide to Republican Party politicians Becky Morgan, Ed Zschau, and Tom Campbell, before going to work in the semiconductor industry. He served in the California State Assembly Representing the 24th District from 1994 through 2000. He ran in the 2000 election for the United States House of Representatives in California's 15th congressional district, but lost to Mike Honda. Cunneen was president of the San Jose Silicon Valley Chamber of Commerce from 2001 to 2005, and then worked for Cisco Systems for two years.
