= John A. O'Connell =

American politician

John O'Connell

Member of the California State Assembly from the 23rd district
- In office January 3, 1955 - January 7, 1963
- Preceded by: William Clifton Berry
- Succeeded by: John Francis Foran

Personal details
- Born: June 13, 1919 Oakland, California
- Died: March 4, 2000 (aged 80) San Francisco, California
- Party: Democratic
- Spouse(s): Barbara Kelley; Patricia Moore
- Children: 3

Military service
- Branch/service: United States Army
- Battles/wars: World War II

John A. O’Connell (June 13, 1919 - March 4, 2000) served in the California State Assembly for the 23rd district from 1955 to 1963. During World War II he served in the United States Army.
