= California's 23rd State Assembly district =

American legislative district

Current assemblymember
Marc Berman; D–Menlo Park
- Population (2020) • Voting age • Citizen voting age: 474,000; 378,104; 305,410
- Demographics: 47.27% White; 1.61% Black; 13.36% Latino; 31.02% Asian; 0.12% Native American; 0.32% Hawaiian/Pacific Islander; 0.64% other; 5.65% remainder of multiracial
- Registered voters: 282,794
- Registration: 54.27% Democratic; 14.46% Republican; 26.94% No party preference

California's 23rd State Assembly district is one of 80 California State Assembly districts. It is currently represented by Democrat Marc Berman of Menlo Park.

== District profile ==
As of the 2020 redistricting (which took effect as of the 2022 elections), the district includes Silicon Valley communities, containing multiple notable high-tech companies and parts of the Caltrain corridor, as well as smaller, rural districts along the coast.

San Mateo County – 16.2%

- Atherton – 97.2%
- Half Moon Bay
- Menlo Park – 80.6%
- Pacifica
- Portola Valley
- Woodside

Santa Clara County – 18.0%

- Campbell
- Los Altos
- Los Altos Hills
- Mountain View
- Palo Alto
- San Jose – 5.5%
- Saratoga

== Election results from statewide races ==
Due to redistricting, the 23rd district has been moved around different parts of the state.

Year	Office	Results
2022	Governor	Newsom 74.7 – 25.3%
2022	Senator	Padilla 76.2 – 23.8%
2021	Recall	Yes 56.5 – 43.5%
2020	President	Trump 50.2 – 47.8%
2018	Governor	Cox 55.8 – 44.2%
2018	Senator	De Leon 53.3 – 46.7%
2016	President	Trump 50.8 – 44.0%
2016	Senator	Harris 53.6 – 46.4%
2014	Governor	Kashkari 58.3 – 41.7%
2012	President	Romney 54.7 – 43.5%
2012	Senator	Emken 55.9 – 44.1%

== List of assembly members representing the district ==
Due to redistricting, the 23rd district has been moved around different parts of the state. The current iteration resulted from the 2021 redistricting by the California Citizens Redistricting Commission.

Assembly members	Party	Years served	Counties represented	Notes
William T. Mears	Republican	January 5, 1885 – January 3, 1887	Sonoma	
George W. Morgan	Democratic	January 3, 1887 – January 7, 1889	Sonoma	
Felix B. Mulgrew	Democratic	January 7, 1889 – January 5, 1891	Sonoma	
Frank J. Murphy	Democratic	January 5, 1891 – January 2, 1893	Sonoma	
James I. Taylor	Republican	January 2, 1893 – January 7, 1895	Marin	
James H. Wilkins	Democratic	January 7, 1895 – January 4, 1897	Marin	
M. Canavan	Republican	January 4, 1897 – January 2, 1899	Marin	
John W. Atherton	Republican	January 2, 1899 – January 5, 1903	Marin	
Frank E. Dunlap	Republican	January 5, 1903 – January 2, 1905	San Joaquin	
Robert Beardslee	Republican	January 2, 1905 – January 2, 1911	San Joaquin	
Elmer H. McGowen	Republican	January 2, 1911 – January 6, 1913	San Joaquin	
James J. Ryan	Republican	January 6, 1913 – January 6, 1919	San Francisco	
Charles J. McColgan	Republican	January 6, 1919 – January 3, 1921	San Francisco	
Joseph F. Burns	Democratic	January 3, 1921 – January 7, 1929	San Francisco	
Joseph P. Gilmore	Republican	January 7, 1929 – January 2, 1933	San Francisco	
William B. Hornblower	Republican	January 2, 1933 – January 2, 1939	San Francisco	
Daniel Gallagher	Democratic	January 2, 1939 – January 7, 1942	San Francisco	Resigned to become a member of the San Francisco Board of Supervisors.
William Clifton Berry	Democratic	January 4, 1943 – May 5, 1954	San Francisco	Died in office.
Vacant		May 5, 1954 – January 3, 1955	San Francisco	
John A. O'Connell	Democratic	January 3, 1955 – January 7, 1963	San Francisco	
John Francis Foran	Democratic	January 7, 1963 – November 30, 1974	San Francisco	
John Vasconcellos	Democratic	December 2, 1974 – November 30, 1992	Santa Clara	
Dominic L. Cortese	Democratic	December 7, 1992 – December 8, 1995	Santa Clara	Changed his party affiliation from Democrat to Reform during his term.
Dominic L. Cortese	Reform	December 8, 1995 – November 30, 1996	Santa Clara	Changed his party affiliation from Democrat to Reform during his term.
Mike Honda	Democratic	December 2, 1996 – November 30, 2000	Santa Clara	
Manny Diaz	Democratic	December 4, 2000 – November 30, 2004	Santa Clara	
Joe Coto	Democratic	December 6, 2004 – November 30, 2010	Santa Clara	
Nora Campos	Democratic	December 6, 2010 – November 30, 2012	Santa Clara	
Jim Patterson	Republican	December 3, 2012 – November 30, 2022	Fresno, Tulare	
Marc Berman	Democratic	December 5, 2022 – present	San Mateo, Santa Clara	

== Election results (1990–present) ==
=== 2024 ===
2024 California State Assembly 23rd district election
Primary election
Party	Candidate	Votes	%
Democratic	Marc Berman (incumbent)	67,177	57.4
Democratic	Lydia Kou	23,723	20.3
Republican	Gus Mattamal	13,290	11.4
Republican	Allan Marson	12,900	11.0
Total votes		117,090	100.0
General election
Democratic	Marc Berman (incumbent)	115,833	59.8
Democratic	Lydia Kou	77,949	40.2
Total votes		193,782	100.0
Democratic hold			

=== 2022 ===
2022 California State Assembly 23rd district election
Primary election
Party	Candidate	Votes	%
Democratic	Marc Berman (incumbent)	83,533	76.3
Republican	Tim Dec	26,002	23.7
Total votes		109,535	100.0
General election
Democratic	Marc Berman (incumbent)	124,602	73.4
Republican	Tim Dec	45,149	26.6
Total votes		169,751	100.0
Democratic gain from Republican			

=== 2020 ===
2020 California State Assembly 23rd district election
Primary election
Party	Candidate	Votes	%
Republican	Jim Patterson (incumbent)	101,217	100.0
Total votes		101,217	100.0
General election
Republican	Jim Patterson (incumbent)	177,600	100.0
Total votes		177,600	100.0
Republican hold			

=== 2018 ===
2018 California State Assembly 23rd district election
Primary election
Party	Candidate	Votes	%
Republican	Jim Patterson (incumbent)	58,927	64.9
Democratic	Aileen Rizo	31,902	35.1
Total votes		90,829	100.0
General election
Republican	Jim Patterson (incumbent)	98,789	59.4
Democratic	Aileen Rizo	67,443	40.6
Total votes		166,232	100.0
Republican hold			

=== 2016 ===
2016 California State Assembly 23rd district election
Primary election
Party	Candidate	Votes	%
Republican	Jim Patterson (incumbent)	73,686	77.4
Republican	Gwen L. Morris	21,522	22.6
Total votes		95,208	100.0
General election
Republican	Jim Patterson (incumbent)	125,123	75.9
Republican	Gwen L. Morris	39,656	24.1
Total votes		164,809	100.0
Republican hold			

=== 2014 ===
2014 California State Assembly 23rd district election
Primary election
Party	Candidate	Votes	%
Republican	Jim Patterson (incumbent)	55,914	100.0
Total votes		55,914	100.0
General election
Republican	Jim Patterson (incumbent)	82,417	100.0
Total votes		82,417	100.0
Republican hold			

=== 2012 ===
2012 California State Assembly 23rd district election
Primary election
Party	Candidate	Votes	%
Republican	Jim Patterson	30,827	39.4
Republican	Bob Whalen	19,992	25.5
Democratic	Richard Rojas	17,690	22.6
Republican	Vong Mouanoutoua	5,487	7.0
Republican	David DeFrank	4,278	5.5
Total votes		78,274	100.0
General election
Republican	Jim Patterson	83,817	54.7
Republican	Bob Whalen	69,457	45.3
Total votes		153,274	100.0
Republican gain from Democratic			

=== 2010 ===
2010 California State Assembly 23rd district election
Party	Candidate	Votes	%
Democratic	Nora Campos	58,629	75.1
Republican	Atul Saini	19,494	24.9
Total votes		78,123	100.0
Democratic hold			

=== 2008 ===
2008 California State Assembly 23rd district election
Party	Candidate	Votes	%
Democratic	Joe Coto (incumbent)	81,523	76.6
Republican	Mark Patrosso	24,876	23.4
Total votes		106,399	100.0
Democratic hold			

=== 2006 ===
2006 California State Assembly 23rd district election
Party	Candidate	Votes	%
Democratic	Joe Coto (incumbent)	49,977	73.9
Republican	Mark Patrosso	17,671	26.1
Total votes		67,648	100.0
Democratic hold			

=== 2004 ===
2004 California State Assembly 23rd district election
Party	Candidate	Votes	%
Democratic	Joe Coto	62,569	67.1
Republican	Mark Patrosso	26,051	27.9
Green	Warner S. Bloomberg IIi	4,597	4.9
Total votes		93,217	100.0
Democratic hold			

=== 2002 ===
2002 California State Assembly 23rd district election
Party	Candidate	Votes	%
Democratic	Manny Diaz (incumbent)	42,461	81.6
Green	Warner S. Bloomberg III	9,610	18.4
Total votes		52,071	100.0
Democratic hold			

=== 2000 ===
2000 California State Assembly 23rd district election
Party	Candidate	Votes	%
Democratic	Manny Diaz	58,020	71.6
Republican	Tom Askeland	17,531	21.6
Libertarian	Dana W. Albrecht	5,478	6.8
Total votes		81,029	100.0
Democratic hold			

=== 1998 ===
1998 California State Assembly 23rd district election
Party	Candidate	Votes	%
Democratic	Mike Honda (incumbent)	45,340	75.8
Republican	Patrick Du Long	14,498	24.2
Total votes		59,838	100.0
Democratic hold			

=== 1996 ===
1996 California State Assembly 23rd district election
Party	Candidate	Votes	%
Democratic	Mike Honda	54,370	73.4
Republican	Lisa M. Sutton	19,712	26.6
Total votes		74,082	100.0
Democratic gain from Reform			

=== 1994 ===
1994 California State Assembly 23rd district election
Party	Candidate	Votes	%
Democratic	Dominic L. Cortese (incumbent)	36,575	64.3
Republican	Frank Jewett	15,647	27.5
Green	Tim K. Fitzgerald	4,630	8.1
Total votes		56,852	100.0
Democratic hold			

=== 1992 ===
1992 California State Assembly 23rd district election
Party	Candidate	Votes	%
Democratic	Dominic L. Cortese (incumbent)	54,539	65.9
Republican	Monica A. Valladares	28,212	34.1
Total votes		82,751	100.0
Democratic hold			

=== 1990 ===
1990 California State Assembly 23rd district election
Party	Candidate	Votes	%
Democratic	John Vasconcellos (incumbent)	43,553	62.7
Republican	Monica A. Valladares	25,895	37.3
Total votes		69,448	100.0
Democratic hold			

== See also ==
- California State Assembly
- California State Assembly districts
- Districts in California
