= Marc Berman =

American politician from California

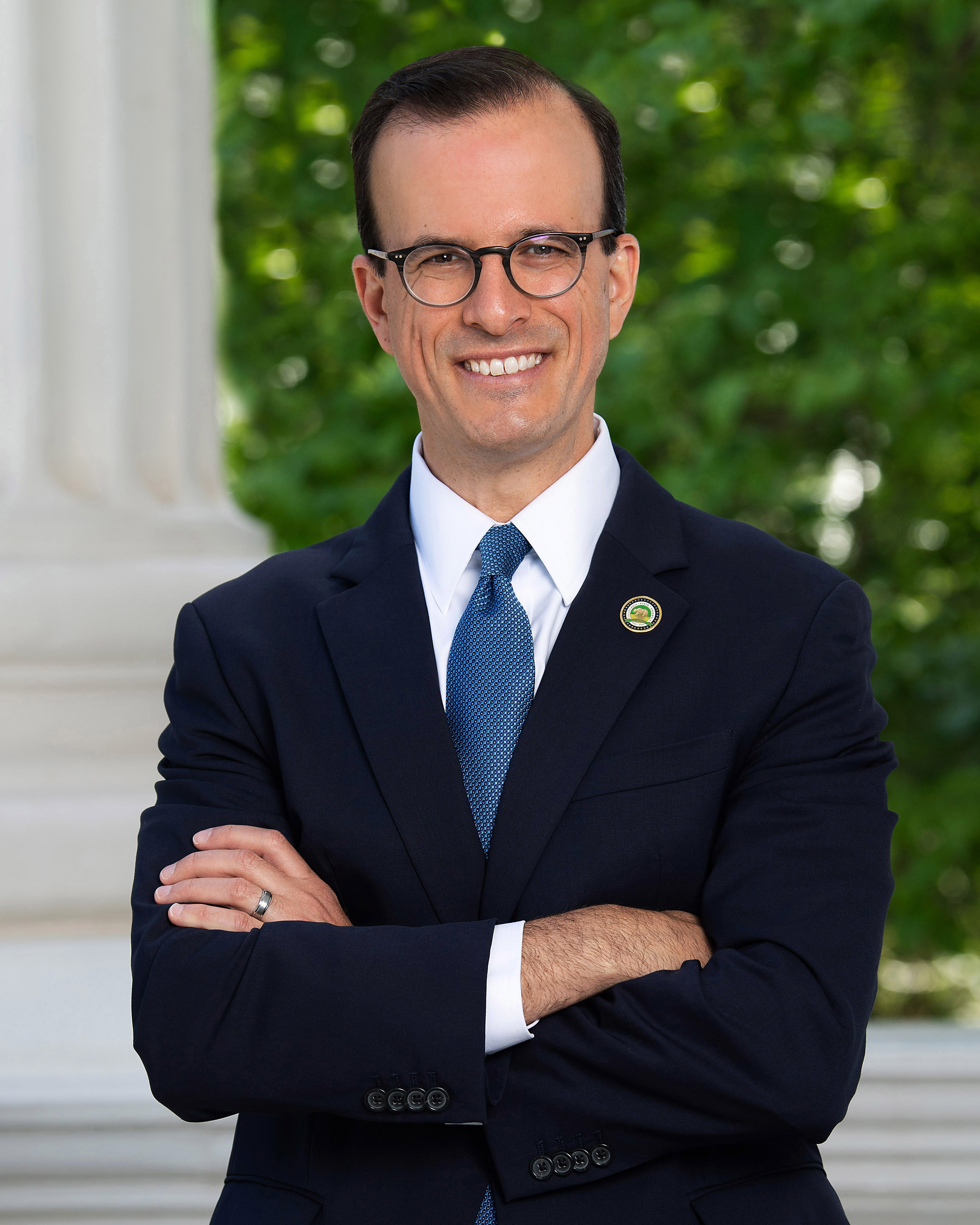

Member of the California State Assembly
- Incumbent
- Assumed office December 5, 2016
- Preceded by: Rich Gordon
- Constituency: 24th district (2016–2022); 23rd district (2022–present)

Personal details
- Born: October 31, 1980 (age 45) Dallas, Texas, U.S.
- Party: Democratic
- Spouse: Aimee Gildea (m. 2019)
- Education: Georgetown University (BA); University of Southern California (JD)
- Occupation: Politician
- Profession: Lawyer

Marc Berman (born October 31, 1980) is an American lawyer and politician who has served as a member of the California State Assembly since 2016. He is a Democrat representing the 23rd Assembly District, encompassing parts of the San Francisco Peninsula and Silicon Valley, including Campbell, Mountain View, and Saratoga. Before being elected to the State Assembly, Berman was a member of the Palo Alto City Council.

== Early life and education ==
Berman was born in Dallas, Texas and raised in Palo Alto, California. He graduated from Palo Alto High School, where he served as student body president. In 2002, Berman earned a Bachelor of Arts degree in Political Science from Georgetown University. He then earned a Juris Doctor from the USC Gould School of Law. In college, Berman worked in Congresswoman Anna Eshoo's office and as an analyst in the United States Department of Justice Civil Rights Division.

== Career ==
After graduating from law school, Berman worked as an attorney at Latham & Watkins and Merino Yebri, LLP. He also worked provided pro bono representation to clients seeking protection under the Violence Against Women Act and individuals seeking asylum from the Democratic Republic of the Congo. Before being elected to the California State Assembly, Berman served as a member of the Palo Alto City Council.

Berman has taken a pro-housing stance, favoring policies to encourage the production of housing to address the California housing shortage. His stance contrasted with the stance of other politicians from Palo Alto, who favor policies that slow down housing production.

In 2019, Berman introduced legislation to ban the knowing and malicious distribution of manipulated videos and pictures ("deepfakes") that falsely depicts the acts or words of a political candidate within 60 days of an election, unless the material is accompanied by a disclaimer that discloses that it contains manipulated content; the bill passed the California Legislature and was signed into law by Governor Gavin Newsom.

During the redistricting cycle following the 2020 census, Berman and fellow Democratic Assemblyman Evan Low were drawn into the same district; Low moved to a neighboring district, averting a primary election between two incumbents.

In 2022, Berman introduced AB 2584, which made changes to the state's recall law. The bill raised the number of signatures required on a notice of intention to recall. AB 2584 also requires recall petitions to be made available for public inspection during the 10-day time period in which the election office is determining whether the petition can be approved for circulation and allows recall elections to be consolidated with regular elections scheduled within 180 days of the petition qualifying for the ballot. The bill was signed by the governor in September 2022.

In May, 2023, the Yucaipa city clerk filed a lawsuit to remove "false" statements made in a citizen-initiated recall petition seeking the removal of the mayor and two city council members. The clerk cited state law, including AB 2584, for allowing the clerk to remove false or misleading statements. The city offered a settlement to the recall proponents to dismiss the lawsuit, but the proposal was rejected in September.

Berman is a member of the California Legislative Progressive Caucus.

== Personal life ==
Berman is Jewish.

== Electoral history ==
2016 California State Assembly 24th district election
Primary election
Party	Candidate	Votes	%
Democratic	Marc Berman	30,649	28.2
Democratic	Vicki Veenker	24,201	22.2
Republican	Peter Ohtaki	21,525	19.8
Democratic	Barry Chang	11,890	10.9
Democratic	Mike Kasperzak	11,343	10.4
Libertarian	John M. Inks	4,546	4.2
No party preference	Jay Blas Jacob Cabrera	2,603	2.4
Democratic	Sea Reddy	2,102	1.9
Total votes		108,859	100.0
General election
Democratic	Marc Berman	92,419	54.4
Democratic	Vicki Veenker	77,362	45.6
Total votes		164,809	100.0
Democratic hold			

2018 California State Assembly 24th district election
Primary election
Party	Candidate	Votes	%
Democratic	Marc Berman (incumbent)	78,140	75.4
Republican	Alex Glew	21,818	21.0
Libertarian	Bob Goodwyn	3,694	3.6
Total votes		103,652	100.0
General election
Democratic	Marc Berman (incumbent)	135,305	76.6
Republican	Alex Glew	41,313	23.4
Total votes		176,618	100.0
Democratic hold			

2020 California State Assembly 24th district election
Primary election
Party	Candidate	Votes	%
Democratic	Marc Berman (incumbent)	99,642	74.2
Republican	Peter Ohtaki	28,408	21.2
Libertarian	Kennita Watson	6,212	4.6
Total votes		134,262	100.0
General election
Democratic	Marc Berman (incumbent)	158,250	73.4
Republican	Alex Glew	57,216	26.6
Total votes		215,466	100.0
Democratic hold			

2022 California State Assembly 23rd district election
Primary election
Party	Candidate	Votes	%
Democratic	Marc Berman (incumbent)	83,533	76.3
Republican	Tim Dec	26,002	23.7
Total votes		109,535	100.0
General election
Democratic	Marc Berman (incumbent)	124,602	73.4
Republican	Tim Dec	45,149	26.6
Total votes		169,751	100.0
Democratic gain from Republican			

2024 California State Assembly 23rd district election
Primary election
Party	Candidate	Votes	%
Democratic	Marc Berman (incumbent)	67,177	57.4
Democratic	Lydia Kou	23,723	20.3
Republican	Gus Mattamal	13,290	11.4
Republican	Allan Marson	12,900	11.0
Total votes		117,090	100.0
General election
Democratic	Marc Berman (incumbent)	115,833	59.8
Democratic	Lydia Kou	77,949	40.2
Total votes		193,782	100.0
Democratic hold			
