= Jim Beall (California politician) =

American politician

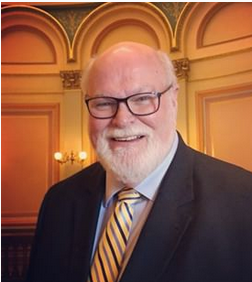

Member of the California State Senate from the 15th district
- In office December 3, 2012 – November 30, 2020
- Preceded by: Sam Blakeslee (redistricted)
- Succeeded by: Dave Cortese

Member of the California State Assembly from the 24th district
- In office December 4, 2006 – November 30, 2012
- Preceded by: Rebecca Cohn
- Succeeded by: Rich Gordon

Member of the Santa Clara County Board of Supervisors from the 4th District
- In office December 5, 1994 – December 4, 2006
- Preceded by: Rod Diridon
- Succeeded by: Ken Yeager

Personal details
- Born: James Thomas Beall Jr. December 7, 1952 (age 73) San Jose, California, U.S.
- Party: Democratic
- Spouse: Patricia Lafkas (m. 1983)
- Children: 2
- Education: San Jose State University

James Thomas Beall Jr. (born December 7, 1951) is an American politician who served in the California State Senate from 2012 to 2020. A Democrat, he represented the 15th Senate District, which encompasses the South Bay and Silicon Valley.

Prior to being elected to the State Senate in 2012, Beall served as a member of the California State Assembly representing the 24th Assembly District. Before his time in the Legislature, he served as a member of the Santa Clara County Board of Supervisors, as well as a member of the San Jose City Council.

== Early life and education ==
James Thomas Beall Jr. was born on December 7, 1952, in San Jose, California. He graduated from Bellarmine College Preparatory and San Jose State University.

== Political career ==
=== Santa Clara County roles ===
Beall served on the Santa Clara County Board of Supervisors from 1994 until 2006, prior to which he served 14 years on the San Jose City Council. As a councilman and county supervisor, Beall served two decades on the California Metropolitan Transportation Commission, where he lobbied commissioners to select the extension of the Bay Area Rapid Transit system to San Jose as a top priority project, enabling it to eventually receive $900 million in federal funding. In the spring of 2012, Valley Transportation Authority and BART officials broke ground on the extension.

In 2022, Beall ran for the Santa Clara Valley Water District board. Seeing no other candidates filed for District 4, he won unopposed. He also is a commissioner on the Santa Clara County Local Agency Formation Commission (LAFCO).

=== District 15 of California Senate ===
In 2011, Beall announced his candidacy for the new District 15 seat of the California State Senate. He won the June 2012 primary election, finishing more than 11 percent ahead of his opponent, fellow Democrat and former Assemblyman Joe Coto, and again in the general election in November 2012, defeating Coto 57% to 42%. He officially took the position on December 3, 2012, taking the role from his predecessor Elaine Alquist (after rezoning).

In 2016, Beall was challenged by Democratic state Assemblywoman Nora Campos, who was prevented from seeking reelection by term limits. Beall won the election by a wide margin.

He served in the California State Senate as a Democrat representing the 15th Senate District, which encompasses the South Bay and Silicon Valley. He was not eligible to seek reelection in 2020 due to term limits.

== Notes ==
Political offices
Preceded by Rod Diridon	Santa Clara County Supervisor, 4th District; December 5, 1994 – December 4, 2006	Succeeded by Ken Yeager
Preceded by Rebecca Cohn	California State Assemblyman, 24th District; December 4, 2006 – November 30, 2012	Succeeded by Rich Gordon
Preceded by Sam Blakeslee	California State Senator, 15th District; December 3, 2012 – November 30, 2020	Succeeded by Dave Cortese
