= Rebecca Cohn =

American politician

Member of the California State Assembly from the 24th district
- In office December 5, 2000 – November 30, 2006
- Preceded by: Jim Cunneen
- Succeeded by: Jim Beall

Personal details
- Born: March 30, 1954 (age 72) Vallejo, California, U.S.
- Party: Democratic
- Spouse: Ronald S. Cohn (div.)
- Children: 1
- Education: University of Texas (BA)
- Occupation: Politician

Rebecca Cohn (born March 30, 1954, in Vallejo, California) is an American politician who served as the California State Assembly member for the 24th District from 2000 to 2006. A resident of Saratoga, her district also included the Buena Vista, Burbank, Cambrian Park, and Fruitdale neighbourhoods of San Jose, the city of Campbell, parts of both unincorporated Santa Clara County, and the city of Santa Clara, as well as a section of the town of Los Gatos. Cohn is a Democrat. She left office in 2007 because of term limits, and was succeeded by Jim Beall. In August 2008, she enrolled at the University of California, Davis School of Law (King Hall).

== Background ==
Born Rebecca Wilson, Cohn grew up in Fredericksburg, Texas. She has four brothers and while living in the Texas Hillcountry her brothers and she were frequent guests at the Lyndon Johnson Ranch. She graduated from Fredericksburg High School and earned a bachelor's degree from the University of Texas in 1976. She converted to Judaism in anticipation of marriage to her first husband, a doctor. Cohn, divorced from entrepreneur Ron Cohn, lives in Campbell and has one son.

== Before politics ==
As a management consultant, Cohn guided various companies in Silicon Valley and throughout the world through the adoption of new technologies and practices. She gained skills in negotiating labor and management disputes during her time in the private sector.

== California Assembly ==
Cohn served as Assistant Majority Leader during her time in the Assembly. Cohn was a member of the committees on Arts, Entertainment, Sports, Tourism and Internet Media, Health, Public Safety, and the Utilities and Commerce. Cohn was instrumental in the development of the state's Medical Examiner competency exam and the establishment of treatment guidelines. She has been active on other boards including: the American Physical Therapy Association's Advisory Panel on Women, the Diversity Task, Force of Joint Venture Silicon Valley, the Santa Clara Board of Supervisor's Domestic Violence Council, and the Board of Directors for the Support of Battered Women.

== Controversy ==
In 2004, she faced a lawsuit from former employees alleging they had been made to do campaign work on state time. In the same year, another employee claimed he was unjustly fired for writing a critical letter about her during a controversial software contract investigation. In 2005, Cohn came under heat for her spicy San Jose Magazine photo shoot that prompted two aides to sue her for allegedly creating a sexually charged work environment (they alleged that Cohn had required them to handle and hold Cohn's bras and panties during outfit changes for the photo shoot). The California Legislature later settled the lawsuit on her behalf, without her consent. She admitted no fault and took no part in the settlement.

== Electoral history ==
2004 California State Assembly 24th district election
Primary election
Party	Candidate	Votes	%
Democratic	Rebecca Cohn (incumbent)	38,599	100.0
Total votes		38,599	100.0
General election
Democratic	Rebecca Cohn (incumbent)	94,152	59.5
Republican	Ernie Konnyu	55,956	35.3
Libertarian	Zander Y. Collier III	8,337	5.2
No party	Michael Roy (write-in)	41	0.0
No party	Lawrence R. Hileman (write-in)	7	0.0
Total votes		158,493	100.0
Democratic hold			

2002 California State Assembly 24th district election
Primary election
Party	Candidate	Votes	%
Democratic	Rebecca Cohn (incumbent)	29,550	100.0
Total votes		29,550	100.0
General election
Democratic	Rebecca Cohn (incumbent)	69,992	100.0
Total votes		69,992	100.0
Democratic hold			

2000 California State Assembly 24th district election
Primary election
Party	Candidate	Votes	%
Democratic	Rebecca Cohn	37,171	77.2
Democratic	Steve Glickman	11,003	22.8
Total votes		48,174	100.0
General election
Democratic	Rebecca Cohn	78,173	50.5
Republican	Sue Jackson	69,825	45.0
Libertarian	Ray Strong	7,000	4.5
Independent	George Swenson (write-in)	96	0.0
Total votes		155,094	100.0
Democratic gain from Republican			

California Assembly
Preceded by Jim Cunneen	California State Assemblywoman, 24th District; 2000-2006	Succeeded by Jim Beall
