= Charlie Meyers =

American politician

Member of the California State Assembly from the 19th district
- In office January 5, 1953 - January 6, 1969
- Preceded by: Bernard R. Brady
- Succeeded by: Leo T. McCarthy

Member of the California State Assembly from the 24th district
- In office January 3, 1949 - January 5, 1953
- Preceded by: Edward F. O'Day
- Succeeded by: George D. Collins Jr.

Personal details
- Born: July 15, 1921 San Francisco, California
- Died: September 12, 2010 (aged 89) San Francisco, California
- Party: Democratic
- Spouse: Alene J. Aviani (m. 1951)
- Children: 3

Military service
- Branch/service: United States Army
- Battles/wars: World War II

Charles W. Meyers (August 15, 1921 – September 12, 2010) served in the California Assembly for the 19th and 24th district from 1949 - 1969. During World War II he also served in the United States Army.
