= 2014 California lieutenant gubernatorial election =

- November 4, 2014
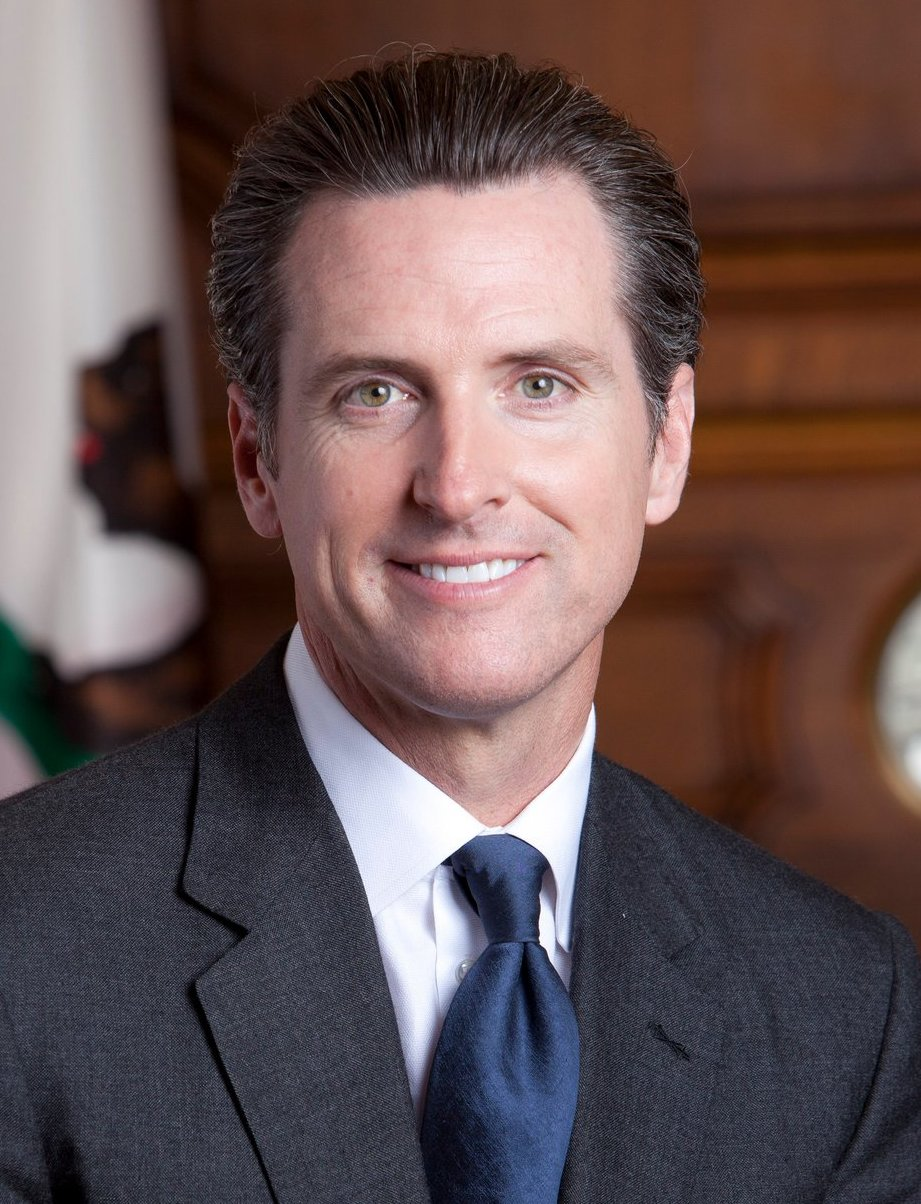

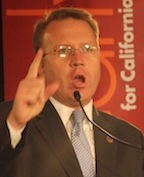
Nominee	Gavin Newsom	Ron Nehring
Party	Democratic	Republican
Popular vote	4,107,051	3,078,039
Percentage	57.16%	42.84%
- County results Newsom: 50–60% 60–70% 70–80% 80–90% Nehring: 50–60% 60–70% 70–80%
Lieutenant Governor before election
Gavin Newsom
Democratic
Elected Lieutenant Governor
Gavin Newsom
Democratic

The 2014 California lieutenant gubernatorial election was held on November 4, 2014, to elect the lieutenant governor of California. Incumbent Democratic lieutenant governor Gavin Newsom ran for re-election to a second term in office.

A primary election was held on June 3, 2014. Under California's nonpartisan blanket primary law, all candidates appear on the same ballot, regardless of party. In the primary, voters may vote for any candidate, regardless of their party affiliation. The top two finishers — regardless of party — advance to the general election in November, even if a candidate manages to receive a majority of the votes cast in the primary election. Washington is the only other state with this system, a so-called "top two primary" (Louisiana has a similar "jungle primary"). Newsom and Republican Ron Nehring finished first and second, respectively, and contested the general election, which Newsom won. As of 2026, this election, alongside other concurrent statewide races, marks the last time where San Diego voted for the Republican in a statewide race.

== Primary election ==
=== Candidates ===
==== Democratic Party ====
===== Declared =====
- Eric Korevaar, mechanical/aerospace engineer, candidate for governor in 2003 and candidate for lieutenant governor in 2010
- Gavin Newsom, incumbent lieutenant governor

===== Withdrew =====
- Michael Crosby
- Larry K. Reed

==== Republican Party ====
===== Declared =====
- Zachary Collins, business owner
- David Fennell, entrepreneur
- Ron Nehring, strategist, commentator and former chairman of the California Republican Party
- George Yang, software developer

===== Withdrew =====
- Ernie Konnyu, former U.S. Representative

==== Green Party ====
===== Declared =====
- Jena F. Goodman, student

==== Peace and Freedom Party ====
===== Declared =====
- Amos Johnson, security guard

==== Americans Elect ====
===== Declared =====
- Alan Reynolds, businessman

=== Results ===
California lieutenant gubernatorial primary election, 2014
Party	Candidate	Votes	%
Democratic	Gavin Newsom (incumbent)	2,082,902	49.87%
Republican	Ron Nehring	976,128	23.37%
Republican	David Fennell	357,242	8.55%
Republican	George Yang	333,857	7.99%
Democratic	Eric Korevaar	232,596	5.57%
Green	Jena F. Goodman	98,338	2.35%
Americans Elect	Alan Reynolds	56,027	1.34%
Peace and Freedom	Amos Johnson	39,675	0.95%
Total votes		4,176,765	100.00%

== General election ==
=== Polling ===
Poll source	Date(s) administered	Sample size	Margin of error	Gavin Newsom (D)	Ron Nehring (R)	Undecided
GQR/American Viewpoint	October 22–29, 2014	1,162	± 3.3%	52%	35%	14%
Field Poll	October 15–28, 2014	941	± 3.4%	47%	37%	16%
Field Poll	August 14–28, 2014	467	± 4.8%	49%	29%	22%

=== Results ===
2014 California lieutenant gubernatorial election
Party	Candidate	Votes	%
Democratic	Gavin Newsom (incumbent)	4,107,051	57.16%
Republican	Ron Nehring	3,078,039	42.84%
Total votes		7,185,090	100.00%
Democratic hold			

==== By county ====
County	Gavin Newsom Democratic		Ron Nehring Republican		Margin		Total votes cast
County	#	%	#	%	#	%	Total votes cast
Alameda	280,933	79.80%	71,135	20.20%	209,798	59.59%	352,068
Alpine	267	58.68%	188	41.32%	79	17.36%	455
Amador	5,076	40.13%	7,573	59.87%	-2,497	-19.74%	12,649
Butte	27,617	45.23%	33,436	54.77%	-5,819	-9.53%	61,053
Calaveras	6,247	40.33%	9,241	59.67%	-2,994	-19.33%	15,488
Colusa	1,457	35.83%	2,609	64.17%	-1,152	-28.33%	4,066
Contra Costa	166,626	65.99%	85,874	34.01%	80,752	31.98%	252,500
Del Norte	3,040	45.26%	3,677	54.74%	-637	-9.48%	6,717
El Dorado	24,745	40.75%	35,983	59.25%	-11,238	-18.51%	60,728
Fresno	72,421	45.86%	85,499	54.14%	-13,078	-8.28%	157,920
Glenn	1,796	30.52%	4,088	69.48%	-2,292	-38.95%	5,884
Humboldt	22,836	62.48%	13,711	37.52%	9,125	24.97%	36,547
Imperial	12,157	59.06%	8,427	40.94%	3,730	18.12%	20,584
Inyo	2,130	40.59%	3,118	59.41%	-988	-18.83%	5,248
Kern	49,007	37.18%	82,817	62.82%	-33,810	-25.65%	131,824
Kings	8,478	38.49%	13,549	61.51%	-5,071	-23.02%	22,027
Lake	10,310	59.27%	7,085	40.73%	3,225	18.54%	17,395
Lassen	1,964	28.90%	4,833	71.10%	-2,869	-42.21%	6,797
Los Angeles	929,107	65.21%	495,577	34.79%	433,530	30.43%	1,424,684
Madera	9,708	36.58%	16,833	63.42%	-7,125	-26.85%	26,541
Marin	66,936	77.12%	19,853	22.88%	47,083	54.25%	86,789
Mariposa	2,518	38.71%	3,987	61.29%	-1,469	-22.58%	6,505
Mendocino	16,698	69.46%	7,343	30.54%	9,355	38.91%	24,041
Merced	17,688	47.63%	19,445	52.37%	-1,757	-4.73%	37,133
Modoc	762	26.94%	2,067	73.06%	-1,305	-46.13%	2,829
Mono	1,526	50.18%	1,515	49.82%	11	0.36%	3,041
Monterey	46,897	64.80%	25,471	35.20%	21,426	29.61%	72,368
Napa	24,174	64.91%	13,070	35.09%	11,104	29.81%	37,244
Nevada	19,203	50.75%	18,638	49.25%	565	1.49%	37,841
Orange	251,920	41.29%	358,227	58.71%	-106,307	-17.42%	610,147
Placer	44,913	40.16%	66,930	59.84%	-22,017	-19.69%	111,843
Plumas	2,767	39.29%	4,276	60.71%	-1,509	-21.43%	7,043
Riverside	156,137	45.07%	190,286	54.93%	-34,149	-9.86%	346,423
Sacramento	183,060	57.47%	135,451	42.53%	47,609	14.95%	318,511
San Benito	8,021	59.93%	5,363	40.07%	2,658	19.86%	13,384
San Bernardino	128,517	45.46%	154,192	54.54%	-25,675	-9.08%	282,709
San Diego	321,791	48.55%	341,030	51.45%	-19,239	-2.90%	662,821
San Francisco	181,717	84.40%	33,589	15.60%	148,128	68.80%	215,306
San Joaquin	57,949	50.31%	57,233	49.69%	716	0.62%	115,182
San Luis Obispo	42,050	49.72%	42,523	50.28%	-473	-0.56%	84,573
San Mateo	113,927	72.07%	44,156	27.93%	69,771	44.14%	158,083
Santa Barbara	59,207	54.40%	49,623	45.60%	9,584	8.81%	108,830
Santa Clara	270,786	69.41%	119,338	30.59%	151,448	38.82%	390,124
Santa Cruz	53,786	75.28%	17,666	24.72%	36,120	50.55%	71,452
Shasta	19,398	34.62%	36,629	65.38%	-17,231	-30.75%	56,027
Sierra	565	37.74%	932	62.26%	-367	-24.52%	1,497
Siskiyou	5,706	41.84%	7,933	58.16%	-2,227	-16.33%	13,639
Solano	54,497	61.18%	34,578	38.82%	19,919	22.36%	89,075
Sonoma	102,242	72.02%	39,723	27.98%	62,519	44.04%	141,965
Stanislaus	40,949	46.10%	47,876	53.90%	-6,927	-7.80%	88,825
Sutter	7,326	36.70%	12,638	63.30%	-5,312	-26.61%	19,964
Tehama	4,908	32.30%	10,287	67.70%	-5,379	-35.40%	15,195
Trinity	1,778	46.34%	2,059	53.66%	-281	-7.32%	3,837
Tulare	22,349	36.49%	38,899	63.51%	-16,550	-27.02%	61,248
Tuolumne	6,955	41.27%	9,899	58.73%	-2,944	-17.47%	16,854
Ventura	97,722	50.24%	96,773	49.76%	949	0.49%	194,495
Yolo	29,108	65.11%	15,596	34.89%	13,512	30.23%	44,704
Yuba	4,676	37.81%	7,692	62.19%	-3,016	-24.39%	12,368
Total	4,107,051	57.16%	3,078,039	42.84%	1,029,012	14.32%	7,185,090
