= Rich Gordon =

American politician

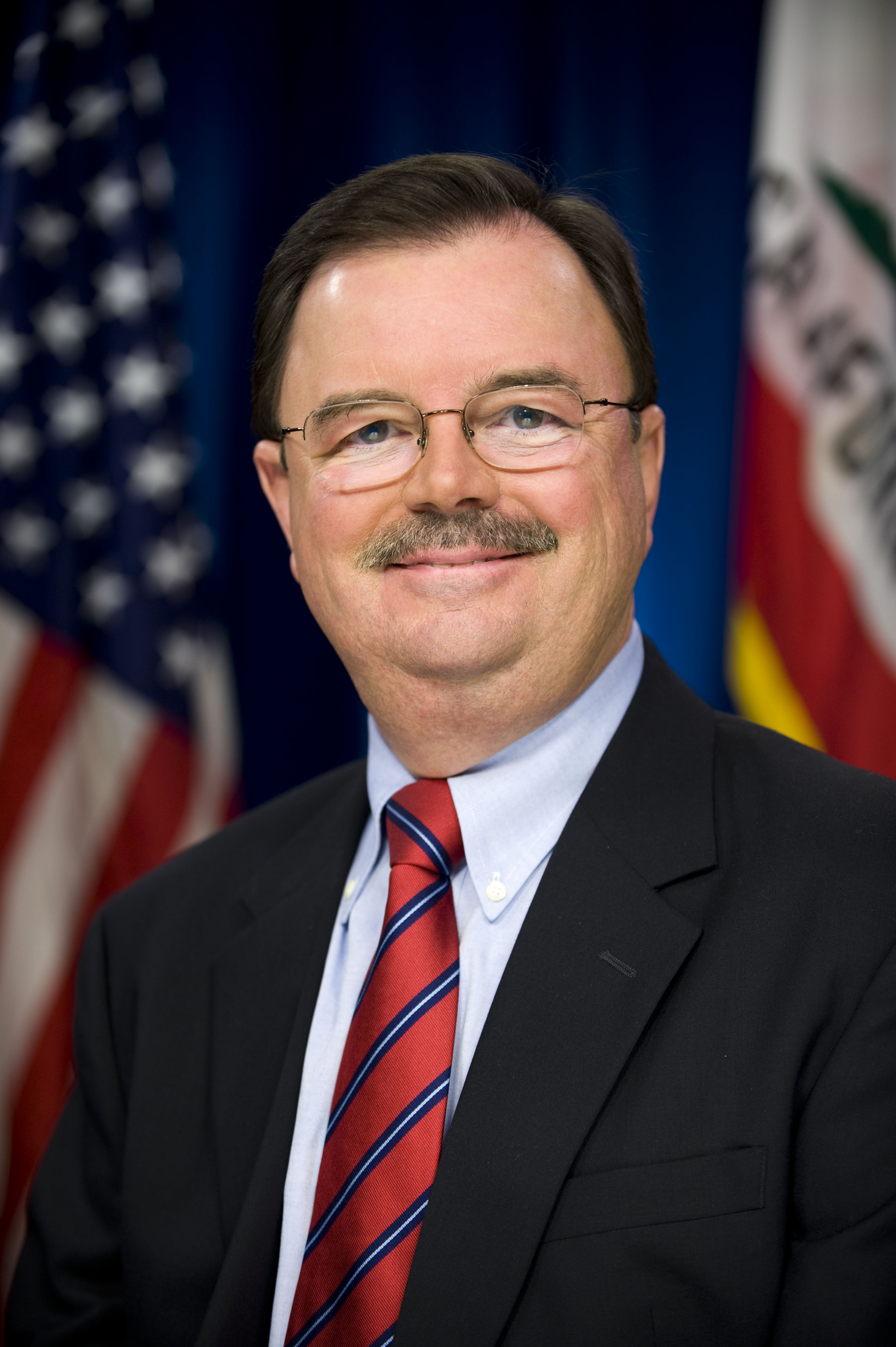

Member of the California State Assembly from the 24th district 21st district (2010–2012)
- In office December 6, 2010 – November 30, 2016
- Preceded by: Ira Ruskin; Jim Beall (24th district, redistricting)
- Succeeded by: Marc Berman; Adam Gray (21st district, redistricting)

Member of the San Mateo County Board of Supervisors from the 3rd district
- In office April 1997 – December 6, 2010
- Preceded by: Ted Lempert
- Succeeded by: Don Horsley

Personal details
- Born: July 3, 1948 (age 78) San Mateo County, California, U.S.
- Party: Democratic
- Spouse: Dennis McShane
- Education: University of Southern California

Richard S. Gordon (born July 3, 1948) is an American Democratic politician from Menlo Park, California. He served in the California State Assembly as a representative for the 24th district. Gordon previously served as Assembly representative for the 21st district, President of the California State Association of Counties, and a member of the San Mateo County Board of Supervisors. Gordon has been openly gay for the entirety of his political career. In 1992 he was the first openly gay candidate in San Mateo County history.

== Early life and career ==
Assemblyman Gordon is a fourth generation Californian, born and raised in San Mateo County. He completed high school in Orange County, and graduated from the University of Southern California in 1970 with a Bachelor of Arts degree in Sociology. He also holds a Masters of Divinity from Garrett Theological Seminary at Northwestern University. His ministry for poverty-stricken children in Chicago developed in him a strong sense of social justice. He married his then girlfriend Terri Tedford in 1974, and moved back to California. Gordon found a job with the YMCA in Fullerton, California as a youth and family counselor. Two years later, he moved to the Redwood City YMCA, heading a program that provided aid for troubled youth. He oversaw a federally-funded project that reached out to youth arrested by police and provided them with immediate counseling. The goal was to keep young men and women out of jail. Under Gordon's eye, the intervention efforts made such a difference that the federal government decided to underwrite a second program- a shelter for runaway kids called Your House. Gordon formed his own non-profit, Youth and Family Assistance, partnered with San Mateo County. Over time, it grew from 4 employees and a $100,000 budget to 60 employees and a $5 million budget. By the early 1980s, Gordon was running a teen health clinic and centers that counseled families beset by drugs, alcohol, and domestic violence. With the help of the designer of the Johnny Rockets chain and the CEO of See's Candies, Gordon opened MiMe's Cafe in Redwood City, a joint project of Youth and Family Assistance and Opportunities Industrialization Center West.

== Political career ==
Gordon first ran for public office in 1992, seeking a seat on the San Mateo County Board of Education. He defeated an incumbent to take the seat and was re-elected in 1996.

=== San Mateo County Board of Supervisors ===
When Ted Lempert was elected to the Assembly in 1996, a vacancy opened up on Board of Supervisors and Gordon ran for the seat. In the special election held on April 8, 1997, Gordon took 41% of the vote in a seven-candidate field and was elected. He was re-elected in 1998, 2002 and 2006. Gordon served a total of 13 years on the San Mateo County Board of Supervisors, from 1997-2010. As a County Supervisor, he worked to achieve government accountability by leading the development of the County's outcome-based budgeting system. Gordon was also instrumental in the formation of regional partnerships including the Housing Endowment and Regional Trust. Gordon was actively involved in the creation of the Children's Health Initiative, which guarantees health care coverage for children. He served as President of the California State Association of Counties in 2008.

=== State Assembly ===
When Assemblyman Ira Ruskin (D-Redwood City) was termed out of the California State Assembly in 2010, Gordon declared his candidacy for the seat. He was one of three Democrats to file for the seat and, in the primary election held on June 8, 2010, he took 39% of the vote. His nearest challenger was almost 2,000 votes behind on 31.5%.He took 60% of the vote in the general election, beating Republican and Libertarian opponents who took 35% and 5% respectively.

After taking office, Gordon served as Chairman of the Assembly's Business & Professions Committee. In June 2012, the Speaker named Gordon Chairman of the Committee on Rules, a position he currently holds (for the 2015 legislative session). Gordon is a member of the following committees: Budget, Budget Subcommittee on Resources and Transportation, Elections and Redistricting, Local Government and Privacy and Consumer Protection. He also chairs the Select Committee on Water Consumption and Alternative Sources, as well as the Select Committee on Waste Reduction and Recycling in 21st Century California.

In his first term, Gordon was one of the most productive legislators; 26 of his 35 bills were signed into law by the Governor. His success continued into his second term, in which 24 of his 39 bills were signed by the Governor. In 2014, Assemblyman Gordon saw 17 bills signed by the Governor, the highest number among the legislators. In 2015, he authored 9 bills that were signed by the Governor.

Gordon was chair of the California Legislative LGBT Caucus from January 2012 to January 2015.

==== 2014 California State Assembly ====
California's 24th State Assembly district election, 2014
Primary election
Party	Candidate	Votes	%
Democratic	Rich Gordon (incumbent)	38,758	60.1
Republican	Diane Gabl	18,021	27.9
Democratic	Greg Coladonato	7,738	12.0
Total votes		64,517	100.0
General election
Democratic	Rich Gordon (incumbent)	77,986	70.0
Republican	Diane Gabl	33,419	30.0
Total votes		111,405	100.0
Democratic hold			

== Personal ==
Rich Gordon is now married to Stanford physician Dennis McShane, his partner since 1982. McShane is one of the founders of a national organization for gay doctors called the American Association of Physicians for Human Rights, now known as the Gay and Lesbian Medical Association. The couple was married in the state of California in August 2008, just before the passage of Proposition 8 in November 2008, which prohibited gay marriage. The law was ultimately ruled unconstitutional in 2010, and the court decision took effect in 2013.
