= Joseph F. Burns =

American politician

Member of the California State Assembly from the 23rd district
- In office January 3, 1921 - January 7, 1929
- Preceded by: Charles J. McColgan
- Succeeded by: Joseph P. Gilmore

Personal details
- Born: January 29, 1892 San Francisco, California
- Died: 1975 (aged 82–83)
- Party: Democratic
- Spouse: Inez L.

Military service
- Branch/service: United States Army
- Battles/wars: World War I

Joseph F. Burns served in the California State Assembly for the 23rd district. During World War I he served in the United States Army.
