= J. D. Barnett (politician) =

American politician

Member of the California State Assembly from the 24th district
- In office January 5, 1891 - January 2, 1893
- Preceded by: James W. Ragsdale
- Succeeded by: Henry F. Emeric

Personal details
- Born: January 2, 1845 Buffalo, New York
- Died: December 9, 1897 (aged 52) Santa Rosa, California
- Party: Republican
- Spouse: Mary Cox
- Children: 4

Military service
- Branch/service: United States Army
- Battles/wars: American Civil War

Joel Dwight Barnett (January 2, 1845 - December 9, 1897) served in the California State Assembly for the 24th district. In 1864, during the American Civil War, he served in Company A, 44th Wisconsin Volunteer Infantry Regiment of the Union Army.
