= Ernie Konnyu =

American politician

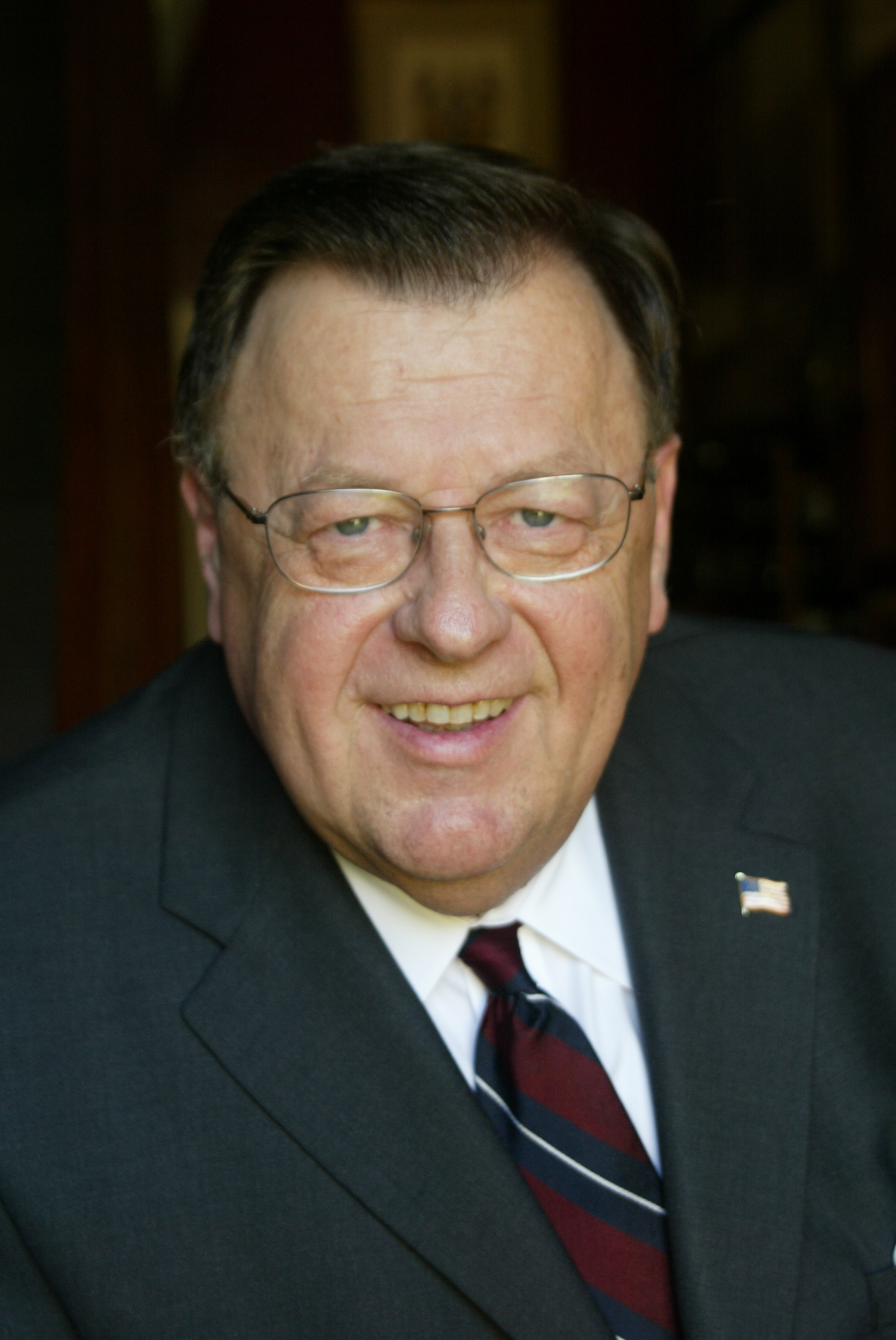

Member of the U.S. House of Representatives from California's 12th district
- In office January 3, 1987 – January 3, 1989
- Preceded by: Ed Zschau
- Succeeded by: Tom Campbell

Member of the California State Assembly from the 22nd district
- In office December 1, 1980 – November 30, 1986
- Preceded by: Richard D. Hayden
- Succeeded by: Chuck Quackenbush

Personal details
- Born: Ernest Leslie Konnyu; May 17, 1937 (age 89) Tamási, Hungary
- Party: Republican
- Education: University of Maryland, College Park; Ohio State University (BS)

Ernest Leslie Konnyu (born May 17, 1937) is an American businessman and former Republican U.S. Representative from Silicon Valley, California, 12th congressional district, serving one term from 1987 to 1989. He had previously been a California State Assembly Member from the 22nd district, serving from 1980 to 1986.

== Early life ==
Ernő "Ernie" Könnyű was born May 17, 1937, in Tamási, Kingdom of Hungary (present-day Tamási, Hungary) to poet, professor and cartographer Leslie Konnyu and Leslie's wife, Elizabeth, a bookkeeper and owner of a home secretarial school, and is the eldest of his two late siblings Gabriela (Helen) and Zoltan (Joseph). In 1949 the 12-year-old Konnyu, together with his family, immigrated to the United States from a post-World War II refugee camp in Ampflwang, Austria. He attended parochial and public schools in Jefferson City and St. Louis, Missouri. He attended University of Maryland, College Park and received his Bachelor of Science degree from Ohio State University in 1965. Konnyu served in the United States Air Force as a captain from 1959 to 1969 and as a major in the Air Force Reserve from 1970 to 1981. In 1959, he married Lillian Muenks of Loose Creek, Missouri.

== Military service ==
Konnyu joined the U.S. Air Force in 1959 as an enlisted medic, served at the U.S. Air Force Hospital in Wiesbaden, Germany, with a final rank of Staff Sergeant, and attended night school at the University of Maryland's Wiesbaden campus, then got an Air Force scholarship to attend Ohio State University, where he majored in accounting. He received his BS in Business Administration in 1965. He was admitted to the Air Force Officer Training School at Lackland AFB, Texas, where he was commissioned a 2nd Lieutenant. From 1965 to 1969 he served at Nellis AFB, Nevada, as a senior auditor with a final rank of captain. He spent 11 years in the U.S. Air Force Reserve ending with a rank of major until he received an honorable discharge retiring from the Air Force in 1997.

== Business career ==
Konnyu's business career began in 1969 as Controller at Valley View Investments in North Las Vegas, Nevada. In 1970 he moved to Arcadia, California, where he was internal audit supervisor at Avon Products, Pasadena. Konnyu, a Certified Internal Auditor, served as corporate director of internal audit at National Semiconductor Corp. in Santa Clara, California, from 1974 to 1980. Konnyu continued his community service work with the Junior Chamber of Commerce first in Arcadia, then in San Jose, California. As a result of his extensive service to the community the Arcadia Jaycees recommended Ernie Konnyu for a lifetime Senatorship in Junior Chamber International which he received in 1973.

== Political career ==
=== California State Assembly ===
Konny was elected as an Assemblyman from 1980 through 1986. He represented California's 22nd Assembly District (western and southern Santa Clara County). He served as Chairman for Policy of the Assembly Republican Caucus and vice-chair of the Assembly Human Services Committee on welfare. His most notable achievement was the California workfare law, A.B. 2580, that required able bodied welfare recipients without small children to work or train in exchange for their welfare check and benefits.

=== Congressional career ===
Konnyu was elected in 1986 to the U.S. House of Representatives, gaining 55% of the vote in the district previously served by Republican Congressman Ed Zschau (who tried unsuccessfully to gain a Senate seat) and Republican Congressman Pete McCloskey. Konnyu's principal legislative success was H.R. 1720, The Family Support Act of 1988, reforming the Nation's welfare system by creating, among other things, work incentives for welfare recipients.

Konnyu voted against the Abandoned Shipwrecks Act of 1987. The Act asserts United States title to certain abandoned shipwrecks located on or embedded in submerged lands under state jurisdiction, and transfers title to the respective state, thereby empowering states to manage these cultural and historical resources more efficiently, with the goal of preventing treasure hunters and salvagers from damaging them. Despite his vote against it, President Ronald Reagan signed it into law on April 28, 1988.

=== Sexual harassment accusations ===
In the first year of his term, Congressman Konnyu caused waves when three separate accusations of sexual harassment were raised, and responding to it in terminology that made it even worse. In one instance, he told a staffer in a private meeting to wear "high heels and frilly" blouses, and then "asked her to stand up and turn around so he could 'see what you look like'". Another time, he commented on where a staffer chose to wear her name tag, stating that it called attention to her breasts. The staffer was then fired after refusing to attend any more private meetings with the Congressman. In addition, he alienated fellow Republicans, including higher-ranked ones. His predecessor, Republican Ed Zschau, started looking to recruit opponents to take on Konnyu in the next primary, and even Zschau's predecessor, Republican Pete McCloskey, called Konnyu an embarrassment.

=== Defeat ===
Konnyu lost the next Republican primary to Republican Tom Campbell, who went on to serve for two terms.

== Business and later campaigns ==
Konnyu resumed his business career in 1989 investing in a printing business then in 1998 in a tax consulting service. After 22 years he sold his business and retired in 2011. He and his wife of 57 years reside in San Jose, California, and stay active with local, state and national professional, charity and political groups.

=== Later campaigns ===
He ran unsuccessfully for Santa Clara County Assessor in 1994, losing the nonpartisan race to Democrat Larry Stone, who received 181,406 votes (52.51%) to Konnyu's 164,045 (47.49%). In 2004, he won the Republican primary for California's 24th State Assembly district but lost the general election to Democratic incumbent Rebecca Cohn by 94,152 votes (59.42%) to 55,956 (35.32%). He ran brief and abortive campaigns to challenge Democratic Lieutenant Governor Gavin Newsom in 2014, to succeed retiring Democratic U.S. Senator Barbara Boxer in 2016, against Democratic U.S. Senator Dianne Feinstein in 2018 and against Democratic Congresswoman Katie Porter in 2020.

== Electoral history ==
1986 United States House of Representatives elections
Party	Candidate	Votes	%
Republican	Ernie Konnyu	111,252	59.5%
Democratic	Lance T. Weil	69,564	37.2%
Libertarian	William C. "Bill" White	6,227	3.3%
Total votes		187,043	100.0%
Turnout			
Republican hold			

== See also ==
- List of federal political sex scandals in the United States

U.S. House of Representatives
Preceded by Ed Zschau	Member of the U.S. House of Representatives from California's 12th congressional district 1987–1989	Succeeded by Tom Campbell
U.S. order of precedence (ceremonial)
Preceded by Peter Barca as Former U.S. Representative	Order of precedence of the United States as Former U.S. Representative	Succeeded by Daniel Hamburg as Former U.S. Representative
