= James L. Quigley =

American politician (1896-1964)

Member of the California State Assembly from the 24th district
- In office January 7, 1929 - January 2, 1933
- Preceded by: Thomas J. Lenehan
- Succeeded by: Patrick J. McMurray

Personal details
- Born: January 27, 1896 San Francisco, California
- Died: November 26, 1964 (aged 68) San Francisco, California
- Party: Republican; Independent
- Spouse: Lorraine Rodney (m.1922)
- Children: 5

Military service
- Branch/service: United States Army
- Battles/wars: World War I

James Laurence Quigley (January 27, 1896 - November 26, 1964) served in the California State Assembly for the 24th district. During World War I he served in the United States Army.
