= Joe Coto =

American politician

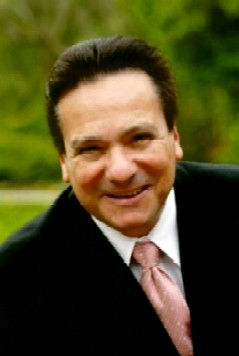

Member of the California State Assembly from the 23rd district
- In office December 6, 2004 – November 30, 2010
- Preceded by: Manny Diaz
- Succeeded by: Nora Campos

Personal details
- Born: September 4, 1939 (age 87) Miami, Arizona, U.S.
- Party: Democratic
- Spouse: Camille
- Children: 2
- Education: San Diego State University (BA); University of Phoenix (MBA)

Joe Coto (September 4, 1939) is an American educator and politician. Coto served three terms as a member of the California State Assembly from 2004 to 2010, representing the 23rd district.

== Early life and education ==
Coto was born in Miami, Arizona, one of four children, to Mexican-American parents. His father worked in copper mines for over 30 years, and encouraged Coto and his three sisters to attend college. Coto earned a bachelor's degree from San Diego State University. He received his administrative credential from California State University, East Bay, as well as a Masters in Business Administration from the University of Phoenix. He has also studied at Columbia University.

== Career ==
Coto began his career as a Social Studies teacher in the Oakland Unified School District. He worked in a variety of administrative positions and left the school district to serve as a City Councilmember for the City of Oakland. After his four-year term on the city council, he ran for Mayor of Oakland and almost beat a longtime incumbent. He returned to the school district and ultimately became Superintendent of the Oakland Public Schools in 1984. In 1988, he was recruited to serve as Superintendent of the East Side Union High School District in San Jose, and served in that position for the next 14 years. In recognition of his contributions as superintendent of East Side Union High School District, the Association of California School Administrators named him the 2003 Superintendent of the Year.

As Superintendent in San Jose, Coto supported Senate Bill 1051, an $80 million increase in funding promoting diversity in San Jose's school system. The legislation has since brought close to a billion dollars to school districts in East San Jose over the years. Coto was also able to bring nearly half a billion dollars in grant monies and improvement bonds to the East Side Union High School District.

=== Politics ===
Coto was elected to the California State Assembly to represent California's 23rd Assembly district in 2004.

New laws sponsored by Coto cover a variety of fields including educational bills providing support to underachieving schools, standards for math instruction for blind students, and over $30 million to support English learners and flexibility in spending to support the educational program. He authored a bill to protect students from vendors trying to entice them with gifts to get them to apply for credit cards. Coto was also responsible for establishing an eminence credential for Native American languages to be taught in California's schools (cosponsored by Assembly member Tom Ammiano).

In the area of health, one of his bills provides cultural and linguistic training for physicians so that they can serve their patients more effectively and another extends the Healthy Families' program so that children throughout the state can be eligible for health insurance. Working in collaboration with the California Chamber of Commerce, as well as other employer groups, such as the California Federation of Labor, he authored legislation to fix part of the workers compensation system in a way that benefits both business and labor.

Coto recently completed a two-year term serving as Chair of the 26 member Latino Legislative Caucus. Prior to becoming Chair, he served for two years as the Vice Chair.

Due to term limits, Coto retired from the Assembly in 2010.

==== Campaign for California State Senate ====
In December 2011, Coto announced that he would run for California State Senate to represent District 15, which includes the cities of Campbell, Cupertino, Los Gatos, Monte Sereno, Saratoga, and San Jose. Coto's campaign focused on improving education to create a competitive workforce, balancing the budget, and solving the issue of income inequality. He was defeated by Jim Beall by a 13% margin in the November 2012 election. The California Fair Political Practices Commission issued a $6,000 fine for exceeding contribution limits and failing to disclose more than $117,000 in expenditures during his State Senate run.

== Personal life ==
Coto and wife, Camille Coto, have been married for 35 years and have two daughters. Both daughters graduated from the University of California, Berkeley.
