= California's 24th State Assembly district =

American legislative district

Current assemblymember
Alex Lee; D–San Jose
- Population (2020) • Voting age • Citizen voting age: 478,426; 374,736; 287,565
- Demographics: 14.44% White; 2.22% Black; 16.17% Latino; 62.57% Asian; 0.18% Native American; 0.50% Hawaiian/Pacific Islander; 0.51% other; 3.42% remainder of multiracial
- Registered voters: 243,992
- Registration: 49.68% Democratic; 15.89% Republican; 30.08% No party preference

California's 24th State Assembly district is one of 80 California State Assembly districts. It is currently represented by Democrat Alex Lee of San Jose.

== District profile ==
The district consists of portions of Santa Clara and Alameda Counties, including the whole Cities of Milpitas, Fremont, and Newark, and portions of the City of San Jose, which was split to balance population while considering communities of interest. This district includes a large immigrant Asian American Pacific Islander community that shares deep cultural and linguistic ties. Many people in this district are employed in the tech industry and rely on Highway 680 and Highway 880 to get to work.

Alameda County – 16.58%

- Fremont
- Newark

Santa Clara County – 10.27%

- Milpitas
- San Jose

== Election results from statewide races ==
Year	Office	Results
2022	Governor	Newsom 68.2 – 31.8%
2022	Senator	Padilla 68.7 – 31.3%
2021	President	Clinton 78.2 – 15.9%
2021	Senator	Harris 74.4 – 25.6%
2021	Recall	No 81.4 – 18.6%
2020	President	Biden 80.3 – 17.4%
2018	Governor	Newsom 76.7 – 23.3%
2018	Senator	Feinstein 62.6 – 37.4%
2016	President	Clinton 78.2 – 15.9%
2016	Senator	Harris 74.4 – 25.6%
2014	Governor	Brown 75.2 – 24.8%
2012	President	Obama 72.2 – 25.0%
2012	Senator	Feinstein 76.1 – 23.9%

== List of assembly members representing the district ==
Due to redistricting, the 24th district has been moved around different parts of the state. The current iteration resulted from the 2021 redistricting by the California Citizens Redistricting Commission.

Assembly members	Party	Years served	Counties represented	Notes
Samuel I. Allen	Republican	January 5, 1885 – January 3, 1887	Sonoma	
William J. Hotchkiss	Democratic	January 3, 1887 – January 7, 1889	Sonoma	
James W. Ragsdale	Republican	January 7, 1889 – January 5, 1891	Sonoma	
J. D. Barnett	Republican	January 5, 1891 – January 2, 1893	Sonoma	
Henry F. Emeric	Democratic	January 2, 1893 – January 7, 1895	Contra Costa	
Charles M. Belshaw	Republican	January 7, 1895 – January 1, 1901	Contra Costa	
Arthur Williams	Democratic	January 1, 1901 – January 5, 1903	Contra Costa	
John W. Moore	Republican	January 5, 1903 – January 7, 1907	San Joaquin	
Arthur Elwood Percival	Republican	January 7, 1907 – January 4, 1909	San Joaquin	
J. W. Stuckenbruck	Democratic	January 4, 1909 – January 6, 1913	San Joaquin	
William M. Collins	Republican	January 6, 1913 – January 4, 1915	San Francisco	Ran as Progressive in the 1914 election. He also died in office.
William M. Collins	Progressive	January 4, 1915 – January 8, 1917	San Francisco	Ran as Progressive in the 1914 election. He also died in office.
William M. Collins	Republican	January 8, 1917 – December 11, 1920	San Francisco	Ran as Progressive in the 1914 election. He also died in office.
Vacant		December 11, 1920 – February 23, 1921	San Francisco	
Walter J. Schmidt	Republican	February 23, 1921 – January 3, 1927	San Francisco	Won special election and was sworn in after his predecessor died in office.
Thomas J. Lenehan	Republican	January 3, 1927 – January 7, 1929	San Francisco	
James L. Quigley	Independent	January 7, 1929 – January 5, 1931	San Francisco	Ran as a Republican in his 2nd term.
James L. Quigley	Republican	January 5, 1931 – January 2, 1933	San Francisco	Ran as a Republican in his 2nd term.
Patrick J. McMurray	Democratic	January 2, 1933 – January 2, 1939	San Francisco	
Edward F. O'Day	Democratic	January 2, 1939 – November 4, 1947	San Francisco	Resigned from the California State Assembly to become a Judge for the San Francisco County Municipal Court.
Vacant		November 4, 1947 – January 3, 1949	San Francisco	
Charlie Meyers	Democratic	January 3, 1949 – January 5, 1953	San Francisco	
George D. Collins Jr.	Democratic	January 5, 1953 – January 3, 1955	San Francisco	
Edward M. Gaffney	Democratic	January 3, 1955 – January 7, 1963	San Francisco	
Al Alquist	Democratic	January 7, 1963 – January 2, 1967	Santa Clara	
John Vasconcellos	Democratic	January 2, 1967 – November 30, 1974	Santa Clara	
Leona H. Egeland	Democratic	December 2, 1974 – November 30, 1980	San Benito, Santa Clara	
Dom Cortese	Democratic	December 1, 1980 – November 30, 1992	San Benito, Santa Clara	
Dom Cortese	Democratic	December 1, 1980 – November 30, 1992	Santa Clara	
Chuck Quackenbush	Republican	December 7, 1992 – November 30, 1994	Santa Clara	
Jim Cunneen	Republican	December 5, 1994 – November 30, 2000	Santa Clara	
Rebecca Cohn	Democratic	December 5, 2000 – November 30, 2006	Santa Clara	
Jim Beall	Democratic	December 4, 2006 – November 30, 2012	Santa Clara	
Rich Gordon	Democratic	December 3, 2012 – November 30, 2016	San Mateo, Santa Clara	
Marc Berman	Democratic	December 5, 2016 – November 30, 2022	San Mateo, Santa Clara	
Alex Lee	Democratic	December 5, 2022 – present	Alameda, Santa Clara	

== Election results (1990–present) ==
=== 2024 ===
2024 California State Assembly 24th district election
Primary election
Party	Candidate	Votes	%
Democratic	Alex Lee (incumbent)	45,605	68.3
Republican	Bob Brunton	14,975	22.4
Republican	Marti Souza	6,156	9.2
Total votes		66,736	100.0
General election
Democratic	Alex Lee (incumbent)	105,150	66.1
Republican	Bob Brunton	53,936	33.9
Total votes		159,086	100.0
Democratic hold			

=== 2022 ===
2022 California State Assembly 24th district election
Primary election
Party	Candidate	Votes	%
Democratic	Alex Lee (incumbent)	26,531	38.5
Republican	Bob Brunton	14,730	21.4
Democratic	Kansen Chu	12,683	18.4
Democratic	Teresa Keng	9,721	14.1
Democratic	Lan Diep	5,308	7.7
Total votes		68,973	100.0
General election
Democratic	Alex Lee (incumbent)	75,232	69.1
Republican	Bob Brunton	33,662	30.9
Total votes		108,894	100.0
Democratic hold			

=== 2020 ===
2020 California State Assembly 24th district election
Primary election
Party	Candidate	Votes	%
Democratic	Marc Berman (incumbent)	99,642	74.2
Republican	Peter Ohtaki	28,408	21.2
Libertarian	Kennita Watson	6,212	4.6
Total votes		134,262	100.0
General election
Democratic	Marc Berman (incumbent)	158,250	73.4
Republican	Peter Ohtaki	57,216	26.6
Total votes		215,466	100.0
Democratic hold			

=== 2018 ===
2018 California State Assembly 24th district election
Primary election
Party	Candidate	Votes	%
Democratic	Marc Berman (incumbent)	78,140	75.4
Republican	Alex Glew	21,818	21.0
Libertarian	Bob Goodwyn	3,694	3.6
Total votes		103,625	100.0
General election
Democratic	Marc Berman (incumbent)	135,305	76.6
Republican	Alex Glew	41,313	23.4
Total votes		176,618	100.0
Democratic hold			

=== 2016 ===
2016 California State Assembly 24th district election
Primary election
Party	Candidate	Votes	%
Democratic	Marc Berman	30,649	28.2
Democratic	Vicki Veenker	24,201	22.2
Republican	Peter Ohtaki	21,525	19.8
Democratic	Barry Chang	11,890	10.9
Democratic	Mike Kasperzak	11,343	10.4
Libertarian	John M. Inks	4,546	4.2
No party preference	Jay Blas Jacob Cabrera	2,603	2.4
Democratic	Sea Reddy	2,102	1.9
Total votes		108,859	100.0
General election
Democratic	Marc Berman	92,419	54.4
Democratic	Vicki Veenker	77,362	45.6
Total votes		164,809	100.0
Democratic hold			

=== 2014 ===
2014 California State Assembly 24th district election
Primary election
Party	Candidate	Votes	%
Democratic	Rich Gordon (incumbent)	38,758	60.1
Republican	Diane Gabl	18,021	27.9
Democratic	Greg Coladonato	7,738	12.0
Total votes		64,517	100.0
General election
Democratic	Rich Gordon (incumbent)	77,986	70.0
Republican	Diane Gabl	33,419	30.0
Total votes		111,405	100.0
Democratic hold			

=== 2012 ===
2012 California State Assembly 24th district election
Primary election
Party	Candidate	Votes	%
Democratic	Rich Gordon (incumbent)	42,018	57.0
Republican	Chengzhi "George" Yang	20,949	28.4
Democratic	Geby E. Espinosa	7,654	10.4
No party preference	Joseph Antonelli Rosas	3,129	4.2
Total votes		73,750	100.0
General election
Democratic	Rich Gordon (incumbent)	118,120	70.4
Republican	Chengzhi "George" Yang	49,700	29.6
Total votes		167,820	100.0
Democratic hold			

=== 2010 ===
2010 California State Assembly 24th district election
Party	Candidate	Votes	%
Democratic	Jim Beall (incumbent)	81,526	62.0
Republican	Robert Chandler	50,087	38.0
Total votes		131,613	100.0
Democratic hold			

=== 2008 ===
2008 California State Assembly 24th district election
Party	Candidate	Votes	%
Democratic	Jim Beall (incumbent)	110,793	66.1
Republican	Doug McNea	56,835	33.9
Total votes		167,628	100.0
Democratic hold			

=== 2006 ===
2006 California State Assembly 24th district election
Party	Candidate	Votes	%
Democratic	Jim Beall	75,769	65.2
Republican	Lawrence Hileman	36,425	31.4
Libertarian	Lionel Silva	3,934	3.9
Total votes		116,128	100.0
Democratic hold			

=== 2004 ===
2004 California State Assembly 24th district election
Party	Candidate	Votes	%
Democratic	Rebecca Cohn (incumbent)	94,152	59.4
Republican	Ernie Konnyu	55,956	35.3
Libertarian	Zander Y. Collier, III	8,337	5.3
No party	Michael Roy (write-in)	41	0.0
No party	Lawrence R. Hileman (write-in)	7	0.0
Total votes		158,493	100.0
Democratic hold			

=== 2002 ===
2002 California State Assembly 24th district election
Party	Candidate	Votes	%
Democratic	Rebecca Cohn (incumbent)	69,992	100.0
Total votes		69,992	100.0
Democratic hold			

=== 2000 ===
2000 California State Assembly 24th district election
Party	Candidate	Votes	%
Democratic	Rebecca Cohn	78,173	50.4
Republican	Suzanne E. Jackson	69,825	45.0
Libertarian	H. Raymond Strong	7,000	4.5
Independent	George Swenson (write-in)	96	0.1
Total votes		155,094	100.0
Democratic gain from Republican			

=== 1998 ===
1998 California State Assembly 24th district election
Party	Candidate	Votes	%
Republican	Jim Cunneen (incumbent)	69,371	57.3
Democratic	Phil Stokes	47,140	38.9
Libertarian	H. Raymond Strong	4,635	3.8
Total votes		121,146	100.0
Republican hold			

=== 1996 ===
1996 California State Assembly 24th district election
Party	Candidate	Votes	%
Republican	Jim Cunneen (incumbent)	83,684	55.7
Democratic	Ed Foglia	59,504	39.6
Libertarian	Jon Petersen	7,059	4.7
Total votes		150,247	100.0
Republican hold			

=== 1994 ===
1994 California State Assembly 24th district election
Party	Candidate	Votes	%
Republican	Jim Cunneen	63,113	51.2
Democratic	Ed Foglia	60,271	48.8
Total votes		123,384	100.0
Republican hold			

=== 1992 ===
1992 California State Assembly 24th district election
Party	Candidate	Votes	%
Republican	Chuck Quackenbush (incumbent)	86,165	49.7
Democratic	Jim Beall	75,776	43.7
Libertarian	James J. Ludemann	11,344	6.5
Total votes		173,285	100.0
Republican gain from Democratic			

=== 1990 ===
1990 California State Assembly 24th district election
Party	Candidate	Votes	%
Democratic	Dominic L. Cortese (incumbent)	48,549	56.2
Republican	Ron Granada	32,887	38.1
Libertarian	Bruce E. Sommer	4,966	5.7
Total votes		86,402	100.0
Democratic hold			

== See also ==
- California State Assembly
- California State Assembly districts
- Districts in California
