= Ira Ruskin =

American politician

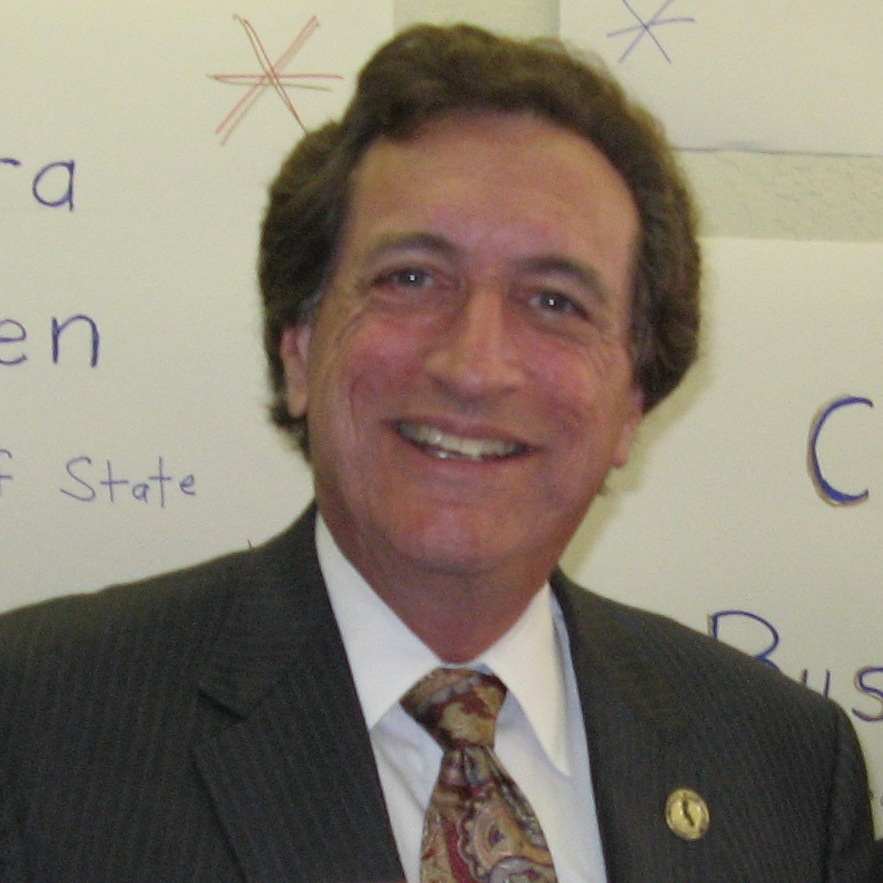

Member of the California State Assembly from the 21st district
- In office December 6, 2004 – November 30, 2010
- Preceded by: Joe Simitian
- Succeeded by: Rich Gordon

Personal details
- Born: November 12, 1943 New York City, New York, U.S.
- Died: July 3, 2014 (aged 70) Redwood City, California, U.S.
- Party: Democratic
- Spouse: Cheryl Ruskin
- Education: University of California, Berkeley; Stanford University
- Occupation: Politician

Ira Ruskin (November 12, 1943 – July 3, 2014) was an American politician from Redwood City, California. A Democrat, he is a former member of the California State Assembly and of Redwood City Council. He and his wife Cheryl (a licensed landscape designer) resided in Redwood City, California; the couple had no children.

== Education ==
He received a B.A. in history from the University of California, Berkeley in 1968 and an M.A. in communications (with an emphasis on filmmaking) from Stanford University in 1983.

== Political career ==
From 1995 to 2004, Ruskin was a member of the Redwood City Council. From 1999 to 2001, he also served as Mayor of Redwood City. In 2004, Ruskin was elected to the California Assembly. He defeated Republican Steve Poizner in the general election. Ruskin had local government experience but initially lacked major campaign funding. The Assembly race heated up when Poizner donated $6 million to his own campaign. Ruskin began fundraising from California's public employee unions and ultimately won the race.

In November 2006 Ruskin was re-elected to the California State Assembly by a wide margin, 67.4% to his challenger Virginia Chang Kiraly's 32.6%. He was re-elected to his third Assembly term in 2008. Term limits in California prevented Ruskin from running for re-election in 2010. Ruskin planned to run for a State Senate seat in 2012.

== Awards ==
Ruskin was the recipient of the first-ever award from DAWN (a Democratic feminist organization) to a man for "excellent work performed on behalf of freedom and equality for women." He helped bring attention to the plight of the Bosnian Muslim women in a public forum which included the live transatlantic interview of rape camp survivors. Ruskin became involved in public policy and politics after working on rape as a genocidal weapon in Bosnia.

== Death ==
In May 2011 Ruskin told friends he had been diagnosed with an incurable brain tumor and was withdrawing from the political arena to concentrate on his health. On July 3, 2014, he died at age 70.
