= Manny Diaz (California politician) =

American politician

Member of the California State Assembly from the 23rd district
- In office December 4, 2000 - November 30, 2004
- Preceded by: Mike Honda
- Succeeded by: Joe Coto

Member of the San Jose City Council
- In office 1995–2000

Personal details
- Born: Manolo Diaz; July 4, 1953 (age 73) San Francisco, California, U.S.
- Party: Democratic
- Children: 3
- Education: San Francisco State University (BS)

Manolo J. Diaz (born July 4, 1953, in San Francisco, California) is an American engineer and politician who served as a member of the California State Assembly from 2000 to 2004, representing the 23rd District. He left his seat in 2004 to make an unsuccessful run for the California State Senate. Diaz served as a member of the a San Jose City Council from 1995 to 2000 prior to joining the Assembly.

== Early life and education ==
Diaz was one of four children, raised in San Francisco's Mission District. His first job, at age nine, was delivering newspapers. Diaz graduated from San Francisco State University, where he earned a Bachelor of Science degree in engineering.

== Career ==
Diaz worked as an engineer for 17 years prior to entering politics, including at the Pacific Gas and Electric Company. He served on the San Jose Planning Commission from 1986 to 1993 before joining the San Jose City Council in the 1994 elections.

Diaz ran for the 13th Senate District seat in 2004, as incumbent John Vasconcellos was unable to seek re-election due to term limits. Diaz ran against Elaine Alquist, the wife of Vasconcellos' predecessor in the Senate, Al Alquist. He lost by a margin of 50% to 46%.

Diaz attempted to regain his seat on the City Council in 2006. He was defeated by Sam Liccardo by a margin of 61% to 39%.

Since leaving the Assembly, Diaz has operated Diaz & Associates, a government relations firm based in San Jose, California.

== Personal life ==
Diaz is married and has three children.

== Election history ==
2006, San Jose City Council District 3

- Sam T. Liccardo 7,883 61.3%
- Manny Diaz 4,977 38.7%

2004, California State Senate District 13 (Democratic Primary)

- Elaine Alquist 34,982 50.1%
- Manny Diaz 32,094 45.9%
- Jose Medeiros 2,864 4.0%

California Assembly
Preceded by Mike Honda	California State Assemblymember, 23rd District; 2000-2004	Succeeded by Joe Coto
