= Disappearance of Amanda Campbell =

1991 disappearance in California, U.S.

Coordinates: 38°16′0.5″N 122°4′42.2″W

- Campbell c. 1991
- Born: Amanda Nicole Eileen Campbell; May 7, 1987
- Disappeared: December 27, 1991 (aged 4); Fairfield, California, US
- Status: Missing for 34 years, 10 months and 22 days
- Other names: Nikki, Nikky
- Height: 3 ft 5 in (104 cm)

On December 27, 1991, four-year-old Amanda Nicole Eileen Campbell disappeared under suspicious circumstances while riding her bike in Fairfield, California, United States. Her bicycle was found near a gate around a block from her home; Campbell herself has never been located. Intensive search efforts took place across Fairfield, aided by the Federal Bureau of Investigation (FBI) and other organizations. Several suspects and persons-of-interest were named in connection to the disappearance, although no arrests have been made. It is believed that she was likely abducted by a stranger.

== Background ==
Amanda Nicole Eileen Campbell was born on May 7, 1987, to mother Mary Ann Campbell and father Jim Campbell.

== Disappearance and search efforts ==
On the afternoon of December 27, 1991, Campbell was riding her bike to a nearby friend's house. Earlier in the day she had been at another friend's house with her older brother. She had left him and had taken off alone, going back to her house to ask her father if she could play at the house of another friend named Beth Ann. He said yes and she left; he had watched her cross Larchmont Drive through his living room window, before going back to what he had been doing. She never arrived at Beth Ann's house, and it was later determined by the police that Beth Ann was not at home at the time Campbell would have tried to visit her. Campbell has not been seen or heard from since. Later the same night, Campbell's bike was found by her grandmother abandoned in front of a gate within blocks of her home. During initial searches, authorities believed that the bike was not in its original position and that Campbell's brother may have moved it. Authorities also found a child-sized blue sock in the area where she disappeared; it is unknown whether she was wearing it at the time of her disappearance.

On December 29, the Federal Bureau of Investigation became involved in search efforts. Two days after the abduction, a motorist reportedly saw a girl matching Campbell's description inside of a Datsun B-210 sedan in East Fairfield, around six miles from where she was last seen. The motorist also noted that it appeared like the girl was "tied up and screaming", although the car was never located after authorities rushed to the location. The Amber Swartz Foundation, formed after the kidnapping of Amber Swartz-Garcia, assisted in search efforts on December 30. On January 1, bloodhounds used by the Centra Costa County Search and Rescue Team that were following Campbell's scent had tracked through a trail near her home but lost scent after around one mile.

In 1992, a billboard went up on the corner of 19th and J Street in Sacramento, picturing Campbell and asking the public for information regarding her disappearance.

== Suspects ==
Locations
1 Larchmont Drive

In July 1992, authorities declared that the abduction and rape of a nine-year-old girl in the Napa, California, area that month may have been connected to Campbell's disappearance; both incidents were traced back to the western side of Fairfield. The victim was lured into a van, brought to a home and raped, and dropped off at the Solano Community College in Fairfield. In 2010, a suspect was arrested in connection to the incident.

The attorneys of a man who was arrested in connection with the 1983 murder of Angela Bugay concluded that the abductions of Swartz-Garcia, Garecht and Campbell were possibly related, although in 2007 Curtis Dean Anderson confessed to Swartz-Garcia's killing, and in 2020 David Misch was charged with Garecht's murder.

In 2001, authorities received a tip that Campbell had been murdered and that her body was hidden in the crawlspace of a home located around one block away from where she had disappeared on Salisbury Drive; a search of the property yielded no evidence.

=== Timothy Bindner ===
In December 1992, authorities conducted a search of 44-year-old Timothy Bindner's home in relation to Campbell's disappearance; Bindner was first named as the "prime suspect" by Fairfield police detective Harold Sagan when he was seen walking out of a ditch in the Fairfield area in January 1992, shortly after Campbell's disappearance. Following the search, Bindner was not arrested or questioned, and Bindner maintained his innocence in the case. Bindner's vehicle was also searched; posters of other kidnapped children including Amber Swartz-Garcia and Michaela Garecht were plastered on the walls of the van, and a small shirt was found in the van's rear portions. When Bindner was searched, authorities found a large chunk of stone believed to be taken from a child's gravestone. Following the discovery, Bindner was placed under arrest for the "disruption of children", but was cleared of involvement in the case. According to Bindner, it was "God's will" that he try to help find missing children, saying they are the "lost sheep" described in the Bible.

In February 1993, Bindner went on The Jane Whitney Show and conversed with Campbell, Swartz-Garcia and Garecht's mothers. In response to Swartz-Garcia alleging that Campbell's scent had been picked up by bloodhounds in his van, Bindner replied "I have a conscience. If I was guilty I would have broken down". He also stated during the segment that "I wonder if [the mothers] will ever understand that I also feel the pain; that my tears are real; that I could never hurt a child; that I have tried to do my best for them and that I love them all", saying that he had gone on the show because he wanted "the mothers to hear directly from him that he did not kidnap their daughters". For the segment he had sat in front of a wall in his home plastered with missing children posters.

Bindner successfully sued the city in 1997 for defamation and invasion of privacy, being awarded $90,000 (equivalent to about $181,000 in 2025) as a result of the suit. The same year, a book titled Stalemate: A Shocking True Story of Child Abduction and Murder by forensic psychologist John Philpin was published, detailing Bindner's involvement in the investigations surrounding the numerous disappearances.

=== David Zandstra ===
In 2023, authorities named 83-year-old David Zandstra as a person of interest in the case. Zandstra was charged that year with the murder of 8-year-old Gretchen Harrington in 1975, which took place in the Broomall, Pennsylvania, area. From 1990 to 2005, he worked as a pastor at the Fairfield Christian Reformed Church, and Campbell disappeared in that timeframe; an address listed where Zandstra resided was only a short distance from where Campbell lived in 1991. In December 2023, Zandstra was cleared of any involvement in Campbell's case, and in January 2025 was acquitted of Harrington's murder.

As of September 2025, Campbell remains missing, although foul play is likely due to the circumstances involved in her disappearance.

Campbell's disappearance was logged in the National Missing and Unidentified Persons System as case number #MP5917, and in The Doe Network as case number 4434DFCO. The Doe Network classifies her disappearance as "Endangered Missing".

== See also ==
- List of murdered American children
- List of people who disappeared mysteriously (1990s)
