= Joel Anderson =

American politician (born 1960)

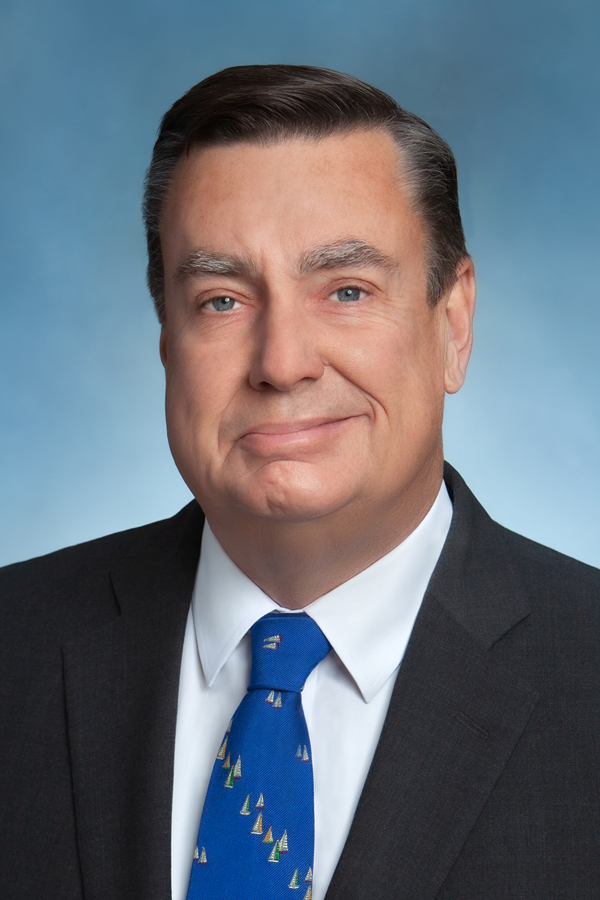
- Official portrait, 2023

Member of the San Diego County Board of Supervisors for the 2nd district
- Incumbent
- Assumed office January 4, 2021
- Preceded by: Dianne Jacob

Member of the California State Senate
- In office December 6, 2010 – November 30, 2018
- Preceded by: Dennis Hollingsworth
- Succeeded by: Brian Jones
- Constituency: 36th district (2010–2014); 38th district (2014–2018)

Member of the California State Assembly from the 77th district
- In office December 4, 2006 – November 30, 2010
- Preceded by: Jay La Suer
- Succeeded by: Brian Jones

Personal details
- Born: February 11, 1960 (age 66) Detroit, Michigan, U.S.
- Party: Republican
- Spouse: Kate Anderson
- Children: 3
- Education: Grossmont College (AS); California State Polytechnic University, Pomona (BS)

Joel Anderson (born February 11, 1960) is an American politician serving as a member of the San Diego County Board of Supervisors. A Republican, he is a former California state Senator, Assemblyperson, and board member of a municipal water district. During his time in the Legislature, Anderson served on the board of the American Legislative Exchange Council (ALEC) as California state chair.

== Early life and education ==
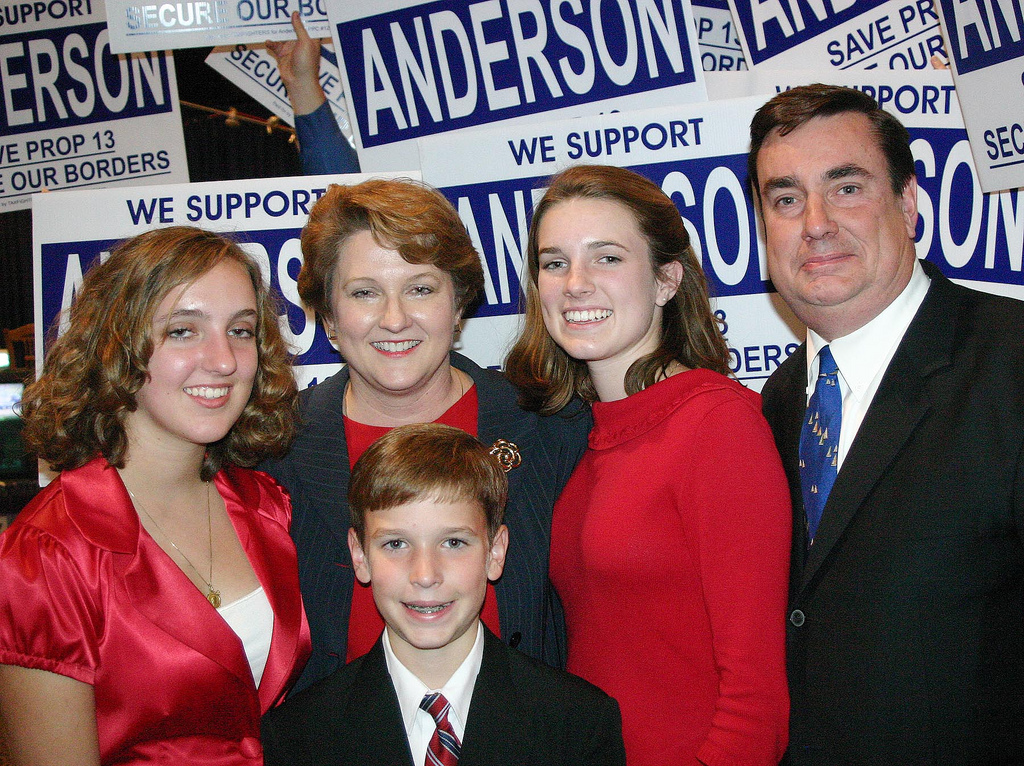
Joel Anderson and his family in 2006

Born and raised in Detroit, Anderson moved to San Diego County, California, with his family when he was in high school. He earned an associate's degree in business administration from Grossmont College and a bachelor's degree in finance and business administration from California State Polytechnic University, Pomona. He served as treasurer on the board of the Resource Conservation District of Greater San Diego County, a member of the board of the Water Conservation Garden, director of proceedings of the Alpine Chamber of Commerce, and as a volunteer at River Valley Charter High School.

== Political career ==
=== Padre Dam Board ===
In 1998, Anderson ran for a seat in the California Assembly, but was defeated in the primary by Charlene Zettel. In November 2002, he was elected to the Division 5 seat on the Padre Dam Board—representing Blossom Valley, Flinn Springs, Alpine, Crest and Harbison Canyon—with 44 percent of the vote while campaigning on the issues of fiscal responsibility and decreasing spending. Anderson criticized incumbent members of the board for excessive travel and for excessive spending on a customer service center. After he was elected, the Padre Dam Board voted unanimously to postpone the building project. In August 2003, the Padre Dam Board voted to build a new office building at the Santee Lakes Recreation Preserve; Anderson voted against the spending measure, and it passed 3–2 with a cost limit of $6 million. In 2006, Anderson was the board president of the Padre Dam Water Board.

=== California State Assembly (2006–2010) ===
In 2006, Anderson was elected to the California Assembly to represent the 77th District in East San Diego County, California. His campaign issues included border security, combating illegal immigration, decreasing taxes and fighting government waste, and promoting Jessica's Law in order to prevent sex offenders residing nearby educational facilities and local parks. He received endorsements from San Diego County Republicans including Ray Haynes, State Senator Bill Morrow, and Assemblyman Mark Wyland. Anderson narrowly won a five-candidate primary over Santee City Councilman Jack Dale by 858 votes, which was tantamount to victory in the general election.

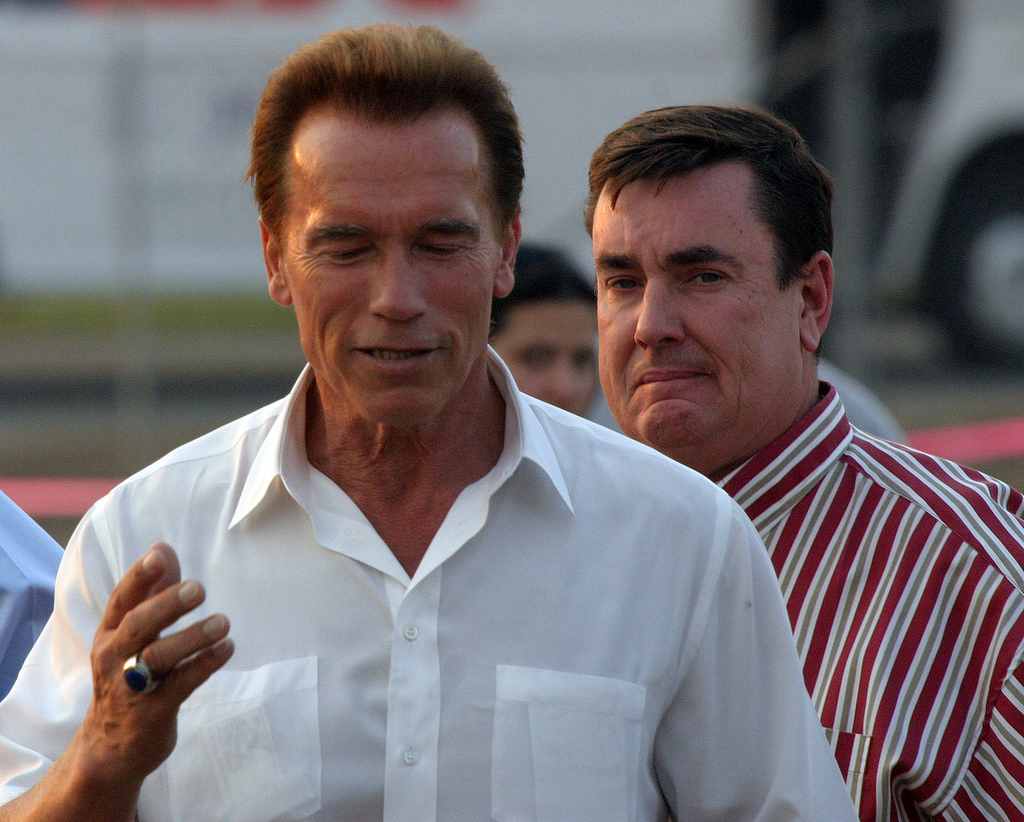
Joel Anderson with Governor of California Arnold Schwarzenegger in 2007

Anderson proposed legislation in 2007 to give disabled veterans a free pass to attend state parks, which passed the Assembly with a 73–0 vote. Democratic State Senator Christine Kehoe said it was "the public's way of saying thank you." Anderson put forth an amendment intended to give the same parks benefit to those that had received the Medal of Honor. Democratic State Senator Darrell Steinberg said it "makes complete sense." On July 27, 2007, Governor Schwarzenegger signed the legislation into law as Senate Bill 60. He stated, "We owe our veterans a tremendous debt of gratitude for the contributions they have made to our state and for their dedicated service to our country. This bill is an important step forward in ensuring that these homes become a reality for our many veterans who need them."

In March 2008, Anderson endorsed Duncan D. Hunter in his campaign for the United States House of Representatives. Anderson also served as the chairman of the junior Hunter's congressional campaign. Anderson and his daughter Mary spoke in support of home schooling in March 2008 after a state appellate court in California issued a ruling that children who are the product of home schooling need to be credentialed. Anderson introduced ACR 115, which requested of the California Supreme Court to overturn the precedent of the lower court.

In 2009, Schwarzenegger signed two bills proposed by Anderson into state law: one that assisted home-schooled children in getting work permits, and another that protected some of an individual's equity in their home from liability. In February 2009, Anderson proposed AB 255, which would mandate blurring detail on Google Earth images of areas deemed sensitive locations including schools, places of worship, government buildings and medical facilities. When asked how he had determined the list of locations proposed to be blurred, Anderson commented, "Well, I looked at where we've had security issues in the past and potentially, might have issues in the future. Churches and synagogues have been bombed. So have federal buildings and then, of course, 9/11. So, the threats are out there and as a state legislator, public safety is my No. 1 job. To ignore that fact would be irresponsible."

In 2009, Anderson introduced AB 1506, which proposed to allow individuals to use California state-issued IOUs to fund payments towards university education, car payments, and payroll taxes. He said he hoped it would "allow California businesses to stay alive while the state is unable to pay them." The bill would mandate that the state must accept its own registered warrants as payment. It received unanimous support from the Assembly Business and Professions Committee, as well as bipartisan support from both Republicans and from Democrats in the majority. Democratic leadership member in the Assembly, John Pérez, commented favorably on the proposal, "It is the recipients of these IOUs who are being punished for the actions of the governor and others who have gotten us into this situation." After the July 7, 2009 vote by the Assembly Business and Professions Committee, the bill was sent to the Appropriations Committee.

In an August 2009 interview with The San Diego Union-Tribune, Anderson identified private sector growth as a solution to decreasing unemployment and fixing the budget in California, and noted, "The long-term answer to the budget is to grow private-sector jobs as quickly as possible while stopping all new spending. My colleagues and I are committed to rolling back high taxes and oppressive regulation on businesses, thus encouraging new private-sector jobs." He characterized "a clean spending cap [as] the single most important reform for California that could be passed in a ballot initiative".

In December 2009, Anderson was fined US$20,000 by the Fair Political Practices Commission (FPPC), relating to solicitations of contributions towards a campaign higher than the legally allowed amount. He stated, "I made the mistakes, and I corrected them as quickly as possible. We didn't spend the money. Once I realized there was a mistake, we went straight to the FPPC and tried to reconcile it."

=== California State Senate (2010–2018) ===
On March 3, 2010, Anderson announced his intention to run for the California State Senate seat, noting "We have solutions to California's problems, but they aren't all politically correct. I want to be part of that solution." Other candidates in the Republican primary included U.S. Air Force veteran and Murrieta School Board member Kenneth Dickson, and Riverside County Supervisor Jeff Stone. Anderson was endorsed by San Diego Assemblyman Nathan Fletcher, the California Republican Assembly, Congressman Duncan D. Hunter, the San Diego Deputy Sheriff's Association, Assembly member Martin Garrick, and San Diego City Attorney Jan Goldsmith.

On June 8, 2010, Anderson won the Republican primary. In an error compared to "Dewey Defeats Truman", the publication Valley News of Riverside County, California, erroneously reported that Anderson had lost the primary. The paper had only obtained the results from Riverside, and not the entire district. The Valley News later posted a new article with the correct results, and deleted the prior incorrect reporting without posting a correction. Running in a "Republican stronghold" district, his opponent in the general election was Democrat Paul Clay, who ran uncontested in the primary. Anderson won the general election by a wide margin.

In 2010, Anderson was the only California State Senator to vote against a $20 million settlement for Jacyee Duggard in response to the State of California having mishandled the parole of Phillip Garrido, a key factor in enabling the continued captivity and abuse of Duggard by Garrido and his wife.

During his Senate term, he opposed any legislation controlling the sale of guns or ammunition. He opposed increased aid to pregnant teens, voted to prevent registered nurses from dispensing contraceptives, and wanted to prevent the inclusion of maternity services in health insurance plans sold in the state. He voted against the minimum wage increase more than once, he opposed requiring overtime pay for agricultural workers, opposes health warning labels on sugary drinks, opposed the sale of medical marijuana, opposed notifying property owners prior to the start of hydraulic fracking on their leased lands, voted not to ban the carcinogen BPA in baby products, voted against requiring mental health coverage by health insurers doing business in the state, voted against the solar power energy credit, voted to keep gender-based health insurance pricing so that women would have to pay more, and voted to allow the resale of recalled products. He also voted against changing school start times, a statewide sanctuary policy, and recognizing non-binary as a legal gender. On June 1, 2017, he voted against a bill to create a single-payer health plan for the state of California.

=== 2018 California State Board of Equalization election ===
On February 1, 2018, Anderson announced that he will be a candidate for the California Board of Equalization, district 4. In a major upset, he was narrowly defeated by former San Diego City Councilman Mike Schaefer.

=== San Diego County Board of Supervisors (2021–present) ===
On February 26, 2020, Anderson announced his candidacy for the San Diego County Board of Supervisors and campaigned as a Trump Republican. In the March 3 primary, Anderson finished first place with 35.5% of the vote. Anderson received an endorsement from the San Diego Gun Owners PAC.

In the November general election, he defeated Republican Poway Mayor Steve Vaus by a margin of 282 votes, or less than 0.1 percent of votes cast.

=== San Diego Treasurer-Tax Collector ===
In March 2026, Anderson announced his candidacy for San Diego Treasurer-Tax Collector. He is seeking to unseat Larry Cohen, who was appointed to the position after the retirement of Dan McAllister in August 2025.

== Political positions ==
=== Foreign policy ===
In 2007, Anderson wrote legislation which mandated that the two main pension funds in the state must divest from businesses that conduct defense or energy affairs in Iran, calling for the divestment of more than $24 billion of public pensions from Iran. This proposal garnered Anderson national attention. AB 221, the California Divest Iran Act, was a bipartisan proposal. The bill ordered the California Public Employees' Retirement System (CalPERS) and the California State Teachers' Retirement System (CalSTRS) to divest from businesses in Iran. Governor Arnold Schwarzenegger spoke favorably of Anderson's legislation, and acknowledged that the state should take a "powerful stand against terrorism". He added: "California has a long history of leadership and doing what's right with our investment portfolio." Schwarzenegger said he would sign AB 221 on the floor of the United Nations during his speech to the General Assembly. CalSTRS spokeswoman Sherry Reser said that the pension fund "will never tolerate support of terrorism". Anderson's bill received support from both Jewish and Iranian groups in California. Associated Dean of the Simon Wiesenthal Center Rabbi Abraham Cooper commented, "The Iranian regime is up to no good. The only thing that is going to derail them is to hit them in the pocketbook." Upon news that the Governor would sign the bill, Anderson stated, "This is a common sense bill. Money is the mother's milk of terrorism."

In 2008, Anderson introduced ACR 79, which called upon the University of California to divest its funding and investments from any corporations that conduct business operations with Iran. In May 2008, it passed through the Assembly Appropriations Committee.

On September 12, 2009, Anderson was given the "Watchman on the Wall" Award by the organization Christians United for Israel at the "Night To Honor Israel" gala. He was recognized for "spearhead[ing] California's Iran Divestment initiative".

On July 20, 2017, Anderson introduced Resolution SJR-10, a resolution condemning the persecution of Falun Gong taking place in China to the Committee of Rules. It unanimously passed a vote of the Judiciary Committee on August 29. On August 30, members of the senate received a letter on the stationery of the Chinese Consulate of San Francisco urging the California senators not to support SJR-10, "so as not to sabotage the friendship and sustainable development between California and China." The letter pointed out the strong economic ties between China and California, such as the high volume of tourism, trade, and overseas students studying in California. The following day, the resolution was voted on and sent back to the rules committee, blocking it from being voted on in the Senate.

=== LGBTQ rights ===
In March 2009, Anderson opposed a non-binding resolution that declared the process flawed by which Proposition 8, which had made same-sex marriage unconstitutional in California, was adopted, and described same-sex marriage as discriminatory towards heterosexual marriage. Anderson received a zero percent scorecard rating from gay rights group Equality California for the years 2007 through 2012.

Anderson was the only Assembly member to vote against AB2199, which would remove "the causes and cures of homosexuality" from the list of mental illnesses and sexual deviancies to be researched by the State Department of Mental Health.

== Personal life ==
Anderson and his wife, Kate, have three children. In 2010, they resided in Alpine, California.

In August 2018, Anderson was accused of sexual harassment by a lobbyist at a fund raising event for the California Nurses Association (CNA). Stephanie Roberson, the association's Government Relations Director, reported to the Senate Rules Committee that an intoxicated Anderson had physically and verbally harassed her before he repeatedly threatened to "bitch slap" her when she objected to his behavior. The threats were witnessed by several people and he was escorted off the premises by restaurant staff. The following month, Anderson was officially reprimanded by the CNA for sexual harassment. He argued that he did not mean "bitch slap" in a threatening way and instead used it to mean something shocking.

California Assembly
| Preceded by Jay La Suer | Member of the California State Assembly, 77th district 2006–2010 | Succeeded by Brian Jones |
California Senate
| Preceded by Dennis Hollingsworth | Member of the California State Senate, 36th district 2010–2014 | Succeeded by Patricia Bates |
| Preceded by Mark Wyland | Member of the California State Senate, 38th district 2014–2018 | Succeeded by Brian Jones |
