= A Stolen Life =

A Stolen Life or Stolen Life may refer to:

- Stolen Life (1939 film), a British drama
- A Stolen Life (film), a 1946 American drama
- Stolen Life (1998 film), a French drama
- Stolen Life (2005 film), a Chinese drama
- Stolen Life (Bulgarian TV series)
- Stolen Life (Philippine TV series)
- Stolen Life (EP), 2015, by Arch Enemy
- A Stolen Life (book), a 2011 memoir by Jaycee Dugard

== See also ==
- Stolen Lives: Twenty Years in a Desert Jail, a 1999 autobiography by Malika Oufkir
- Stolen (2009 American film), prerelease title Stolen Lives
