= Carol Bentley Ellis =

American legislator (1945–2021)

- Carol Bentley (later Ellis), from a 1988 newspaper
- Born: Carol Curtis; February 26, 1945; Riverside, California
- Died: December 13, 2021 (aged 76); California
- Occupation: Politician

Carol Bentley Ellis (born Carol Curtis; February 26, 1945 – December 13, 2021) was an American politician from California and a member of the Republican Party.

== Early life and education ==
She was born Carol Curtis in Riverside, California, the daughter of Francis Curtis and Irene Ingberg Curtis. She had a twin sister, Joy. She studied marketing at San Diego State University, and graduated from SDSU in 1968.

== Career ==
Bentley started her career as an aide to Republican state senator Jack Schrade. From 1978 to 1988 she served as chief of staff for state senator Jim Ellis (R-San Diego).

In 1988 she was elected to the California State Assembly, succeeding Larry Sterling (R-El Cajon) who had been elected to succeed Ellis in the State Senate.

In 1989 she entered the special election for the State Senate that Sterling had just won. He had been appointed to a municipal judgeship earlier that year. Her opponent in that race was Democratic assemblywoman Lucy Killea, who drew national attention when she was denied communion by the Roman Catholic bishop of San Diego, for her pro-choice position on abortion; the story drew national attention, and increased donations for Killea's winning campaign.

Reelected in 1990, Bentley opted to leave the assembly two years later and instead make another run for the State Senate.

She faced veteran assemblyman David G. Kelley in the 1992 Republican primary for the open (and redrawn) 37th district. The race became unexpectedly heated, with Kelley hitting her on ethics (In 1991, she proposed a bill that would directly benefit one of her contributors, Coleman College, by exempting them from state financial oversight), and accused her of taking inappropriate expense reimbursements from the state. But it was his attacks over her "ghost voting" (leaving her voting card behind while she was away from the Capitol and allowing other members to vote for her) that threw her campaign off balance. Kelley prevailed with 52% of the vote.

During her time in the legislature, she advocated for crime victims and, after her final term in the assembly ended, she served as a member of the California Board of Prison Terms from 1993 to 2005.

In later years, she sold real estate in Mission Beach.

== Personal life ==
Curtis married David Bentley in 1967; they divorced in 1990. She remarried in 1997, to former state senator Jim Ellis, whose chief of staff she had served as at the start of her political career. He died in 2017. She died in 2021, at the age of 76.

== Electoral history ==
Member, California State Assembly: 1989-1993
Year	Office	Democrat	Votes	Pct	Republican	Votes	Pct
1988	California State Assembly; District 75	Sam Hornreich	41,552	32.3%	Carol Bentley	82,428	64.1%
1989	California State Senate; District 39 (special election)	Lucy Killea	62,283	51%	Carol Bentley	59,721	48.9%
1990	California State Assembly; District 75	Tom Connolly	35,514	35%	Carol Bentley	54,438	53.7%
1992	California State Senate; District 37	James Rickard	101,872	37.7%	Carol Bentley 48% David G. Kelley 52%	141,970	52.5%

California Assembly
Preceded by Larry Stirling	Member of the California State Assembly from the 75th district December 4, 1988 - November 30, 1992	Succeeded by Tom Connolly
