= Clarence R. Walker =

American politician (1892–1959)

Member of the California State Assembly from the 77th district
- In office January 7, 1935 – January 6, 1941
- Preceded by: Samuel E. Robinson
- Succeeded by: Harvey E. Hastain

Personal details
- Born: April 13, 1892 Wahoo, Nebraska, U.S.
- Died: July 22, 1959 (aged 67) California, U.S.
- Party: Republican
- Spouse: Emma Virginia
- Children: 2

Military service
- Branch/service: United States Army
- Battles/wars: World War I

Clarence R. Walker (April 13, 1892 – July 22, 1959) was an American politician. He served in the California State Assembly for the 77th district from 1935 to 1941. During World War I, he served in the United States Army.
