= Disappearance of Michaela Garecht =

1988 kidnapping in Hayward, California

Michaela Garecht
- Born: Michaela Joy Garecht; January 24, 1979; Oakland, California, U.S.
- Disappeared: November 19, 1988 (aged 9); Hayward, California, U.S. 37.6106°N 122.0260°W
- Status: Missing for 38 years and 3 days
- Height: 4 ft 8 in (1.42 m)
- Parents: Rod Garecht (father); Sharon Murch (mother)

External image
- Age progression of Garecht (2012), produced by the National Center for Missing and Exploited Children

On November 19, 1988, nine-year-old Michaela Joy Garecht (born January 24, 1979) was abducted in broad daylight at the corner of Mission Boulevard and Lafayette Avenue in Hayward, California, United States. Sketches of Garecht's abductor were distributed along with missing person flyers throughout the San Francisco Bay Area within 24 hours of her disappearance, but search efforts proved fruitless. Her case was featured in national media, including profiles on the documentary series Unsolved Mysteries.

After the 2009 release of Jaycee Dugard, who had been kidnapped in Meyers, California, and held captive by Phillip and Nancy Garrido for nearly two decades, renewed interest was brought on Garecht's case, and Garrido was interviewed regarding Garecht's abduction. In 2012, Wesley Shermantine, a convicted serial killer who committed various murders with his accomplice, Loren Herzog—known collectively as the Speed Freak Killers—brought to the attention of law enforcement that the original sketches of Garecht's abductor bore a striking similarity to Herzog, who had committed suicide while on parole from prison in January 2012. While bone fragments discovered in one of Herzog and Shermantine's disposal sites was thought to belong to Garecht, DNA profiling completed in late 2012 proved they were not hers. On December 21, 2020, thirty-two years after the abduction of Garecht, David Misch was charged with her abduction and murder.

== Timeline ==
=== Abduction ===
Garecht was abducted at approximately 10:15 a.m. on Saturday, November 19, 1988. She and her friend, Katrina "Trina" Rodriguez, left home at 10:00 a.m. and rode their scooters to the Rainbow Market, two blocks away, to purchase food and sodas.

The girls left their scooters by the front door (now the side door) as they went inside the store. Upon leaving the store, the two girls started walking home, forgetting about the scooters. When they realized they had forgotten them, they turned back to where they left them; however, they saw that one scooter was missing. Garecht then spotted the scooter farther down in the market parking lot, where it had been placed near a parked car. When Garecht bent down to pick the scooter up by the handle bars, an unidentified white male came out of the parked car, picked her up with his right arm around her waist, and put her into his car as she screamed. Rodriguez recalled the scene: "I looked up when I heard a scream, and I saw a man putting her into his car. She was still screaming. I just stood and watched, frozen in shock." The only witness to the abduction, Rodriguez ran back into the store to get help. The abductor escaped with Garecht, while Rodriguez notified a female clerk who phoned police at 10:23 a.m. to report the kidnapping. At the time of her abduction, Garecht was wearing a t-shirt with the word "Metro" on the front, rolled-up denim jeans, black Mary Jane shoes, and pearl-colored feather-shaped earrings.

=== Witness' description ===
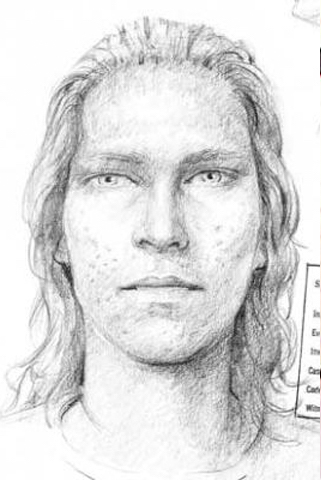
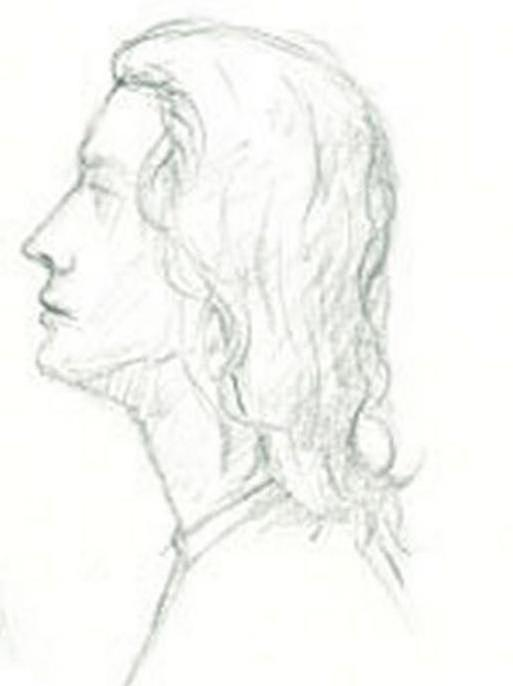
Original sketches of the man seen kidnapping Garecht

In the 911 transcript, the female store clerk who phoned police on behalf of Rodriguez described the man who allegedly abducted her as "hippy-like" in appearance. However, it was subsequently revealed that the clerk had offered an incorrect description of the man, and had inadvertently mistaken him for someone else she had seen driving in the parking lot. The clerk described a man in his thirties with a mustache, driving a burgundy-colored car, a false description which was erroneously distributed in the media for nearly two days following Garecht's abduction. Journalist Dennis Oliver commented:

"For two days the Hayward Police Department allowed media to publish false descriptions of the suspect. The first opportunity and best opportunity to rescue this girl was immediately after it happened, and for two days they were looking for the wrong person. The dispatcher took information from the wrong person — and from there on out communication was just not handled correctly in the crucial first 24 to 48 hours."

Rodriguez, the sole witness to the abduction, described Garecht's captor as a white male in his twenties. The most distinguishing characteristic was that he seemed to have severe acne or pockmarks on his face. He had shoulder length, dirty blond hair. He was around 6 feet 0 inches (1.83 meters) in height and had a slender build. The witness described him as having fox-like, blue eyes and wearing a white T-shirt.

According to Rodriguez, the abductor drove a large, older model, American-made sedan. It was possibly a four-door vehicle and was either cream or tannish gold in color. The car may have had cement splatters on the sides and lights set into the rear bumper. The front bumper was battered; the vehicle appeared run-down, it may have previously been in an accident. The car was last seen speeding south on Mission Boulevard toward nearby Union City, California, with Garecht inside.

=== Initial search efforts ===
Garecht's kidnapping led to one of the most extensive police investigations by the Hayward Police department and they received 5,000 tips in the first year alone. In the days following Garecht's abduction, police and the Federal Bureau of Investigation (FBI) searched hillsides, parks, and unpopulated areas in southern Alameda County by helicopter and airplane. Forensic inspection of Garecht's scooter yielded fingerprints from an unknown source, which law enforcement believed may have belonged to Garecht's abductor.

On November 30, 1988, San Francisco 49ers quarterback Joe Montana made a public plea for the safe return of Garecht. The majority of the tips submitted occurred within the first month of Garecht's abduction, as it was reported by The San Francisco Examiner that approximately 4,000 tips had been received by late December 1988. In this December report, an officer from the Hayward Police Department commented: "The only way we are closer to finding out what happened is that we have eliminated so many leads in this case. But as far as knowing who did it, or why, or what happened to her... we're no closer." A reward fund of over $70,000 (about $191,000 in 2025) was posted at this time for anyone who could provide information of Garecht's whereabouts. At the time of the kidnapping, Garecht's photo was featured as a missing child on milk cartons and billboards nationally and thousands of fliers and posters were spread throughout the community; within a day of her disappearance, family and volunteers had distributed 42,000 missing person fliers.

In December 1992, a false lead was produced in Garecht's case when a prison inmate in Indiana named Roger Haggard claimed to have buried Garecht's body in the Hunters Point area of San Francisco. Upon further inquiry, Haggard alternately claimed he buried Garecht in a gladiolus field in Union City. Haggard was flown to San Francisco to recover Garecht's body, but after eight hours of inspecting the alleged field, he admitted he had invented the story, resulting in an additional six-and-a-half years being added to his preexisting sentence.

In 1994, The Daily Review reported that police had followed up on more than 15,000 leads. More than three decades later, the investigation at the Hayward Police Station continues. Chief investigator Inspector Robert Lampkin declared, "We'll go anywhere, any corner of the earth to try to bring Michaela home".

=== Later developments and suspects ===
==== Tim Bindner ====
Law enforcement considered the kidnapping of Amber Swartz in Pinole in June 1988 as potentially connected, given its proximity to Hayward. Tim Bindner, a man who injected himself into the search for Swartz, became a suspect in her disappearance, as well as that of Garecht. He was also considered a suspect in the disappearance of Ilene Misheloff, a 13-year-old who vanished from Dublin, California in 1989, and Amanda Campbell, who went missing in Fairfield in 1991. However, Bindner has repeatedly denied involvement in any of the disappearances. In 1997, a book titled Stalemate: A Shocking True Story of Child Abduction and Murder by forensic psychologist John Philpin was published, detailing Bindner's involvement in the investigations surrounding these various disappearances.

==== Phillip Garrido ====
The 2009 release of kidnapped schoolgirl Jaycee Lee Dugard, after 18 years in captivity, led police to be initially hopeful that Dugard's abductor, Phillip Garrido, might have also been involved in Garecht's disappearance. Hayward is within an hour's drive from Garrido's Antioch home in Contra Costa County, and Garecht's abduction took place three months after Garrido was freed from prison for rape and kidnapping. Like Garecht, Dugard was also thrown into the back of a car in broad daylight and in the presence of witnesses. The general description of the kidnapper and the car used in both kidnappings is also similar. The Hayward Police Department conducted an extensive investigation into the Garridos, and no evidence linking them to Garecht's abduction was found. The connection did, however, propel Garecht back into national and international attention and brought forth new leads.

==== Loren Herzog ====
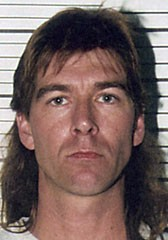
Loren Herzog, one of the Speed Freak Killers, bore a strong resemblance to the police sketch

In August 2012, Wesley Shermantine, one of the so-called Speed Freak Killers duo, wrote a letter to The Stockton Record after his partner in crime, Loren Herzog, committed suicide in January 2012, in which he pointed out that Herzog bore a resemblance to the composite of the person who kidnapped "that Hayward girl." Shermantine and Herzog, who were apprehended in 1999, are suspected of having committed up to 19 murders in Northern California. Commenting on the likeness Herzog bore to Garecht's kidnapper, witness Katrina Rodriguez commented: "I thought then and I think now he could be the kidnapper... I think there are features that look very much like the man...It seems like a strong lead."

At Shermantine's direction, law enforcement began excavating an abandoned well in rural Linden, California, in February 2012, where Herzog and Shermantine disposed of their victims. Thousands of bone fragments belonging to five different individuals were recovered from the well, some of which were believed to potentially belong to Garecht. However, DNA profiling completed later that year excluded Garecht as a possibility; the bones believed to have been hers were determined to be those of 19-year-old Kimberly Billy, who had disappeared in 1984. In January 2013, further excavations of abandoned wells in the area were completed, but yielded no further remains.

In 2015, a legal motion was filed by attorney Mark Geragos on behalf of a detective who was informed by a San Joaquin sheriff's deputy that a pair of Mary Jane shoes discovered in one of the Linden wells bore similarity to the shoes Garecht was last seen wearing. According to the detective, San Joaquin police refused to show him the shoes either physically or in photographs and, as of March 2015, the shoes had not been examined by the Hayward Police Department.

==== David Misch ====
On December 21, 2020, the Hayward Police Department, along with the FBI, announced the arrest of David Misch for the kidnapping and murder after he was linked to the crimes via fingerprint left on Garecht's scooter at the abduction site. Misch is currently in prison for the murder of 36-year-old Margaret Ball in 1989 in Hayward, CA. He has also been charged with the 1986 murders of best friends Michelle Xavier, 18, and Jennifer Duey, 20, in Fremont, CA.

== Cultural significance ==
Garecht's kidnapping was a high-profile missing-child case, and received national media attention; hers was the first missing-child case to be featured on America's Most Wanted in 1988. The case was featured once again on the show in 2009. The case has also featured on numerous other television shows: It was profiled on Unsolved Mysteries, which aired a segment on the case in January 1989. In 1999, Katrina Rodriguez, Garecht's friend who witnessed her kidnapping, appeared on the Maury show.

In 2009, Garecht's kidnapping was profiled on Dateline NBC and Larry King Live. The case has also caught the attention of the international media. The anniversary of Garecht's kidnapping has been marked every year at the location where the kidnapping took place. Numerous ribbons, new and old, are tied to the tree next to where the kidnapper's car was parked. Her mother, Sharon, maintains a blog dedicated to her daughter. In May 2019, the FBI posted a $10,000 reward for information regarding Garecht's disappearance.

== See also ==
- List of people who disappeared mysteriously: 1910–1990

== Sources ==
- Philpin, John (2009) [1997]. Stalemate: A Shocking True Story of Child Abduction and Murder. New York: Random House. ISBN 978-0-307-57400-8.
- Scott, Robert (2001). Rope Burns. New York: Kensington Books. ISBN 978-0-786-01195-7.
