= Thomas Maximus Connolly III =

American aatorney and politician

Tom Connolly

Member of the California State Assembly from the 77th district
- In office December 2, 1992 – November 30, 1994
- Preceded by: Carol Bentley
- Succeeded by: Steven C. Baldwin

Personal details
- Born: May 12, 1946 Toledo, Ohio
- Died: {} []
- Party: Democratic
- Spouse: Janet (m. 1988)

Military service
- Branch/service: United States Marine Corps

Thomas Maximus Connolly III (born May 12, 1946) is an American politician from California and a member of the Democratic Party.

An attorney from Lemon Grove, Connelly initially ran for the California State Assembly in 1990, losing to incumbent Carol Bentley in a Republican-tilting, San Diego area district. In 1992, when Bentley left the seat open to run for the California State Senate, Connolly narrowly defeated Republican Steven C. Baldwin, despite the continued Republican lean to the redrawn district. In a 1994 rematch, however, Baldwin trounced Connolly by more than 11 points during an election year that saw the GOP wave also hand Republicans control of the California State Assembly for the first time in more than 20 years.

== Electoral history ==
Member, California State Assembly: 1992-1994
Year	Office	Democrat	Votes	Pct	Republican	Votes	Pct
1990	California State Assembly; District 77	Tom Connolly	35,514	35%	Carol Bentley	54,438	53.7%
1992	California State Assembly; District 77	Tom Connelly	64,143	47.8%	Steven C. Baldwin	59,884	44.6%
1994	California State Assembly; District 77	Tom Connolly	42,389	44.2%	Steven C. Baldwin	53,442	55.8%

Political offices
Preceded by Carol Bentley	California State Assembly 77th District; 1992 – 1994	Succeeded by Steven C. Baldwin
