= Clyde Bishop (politician) =

American politician

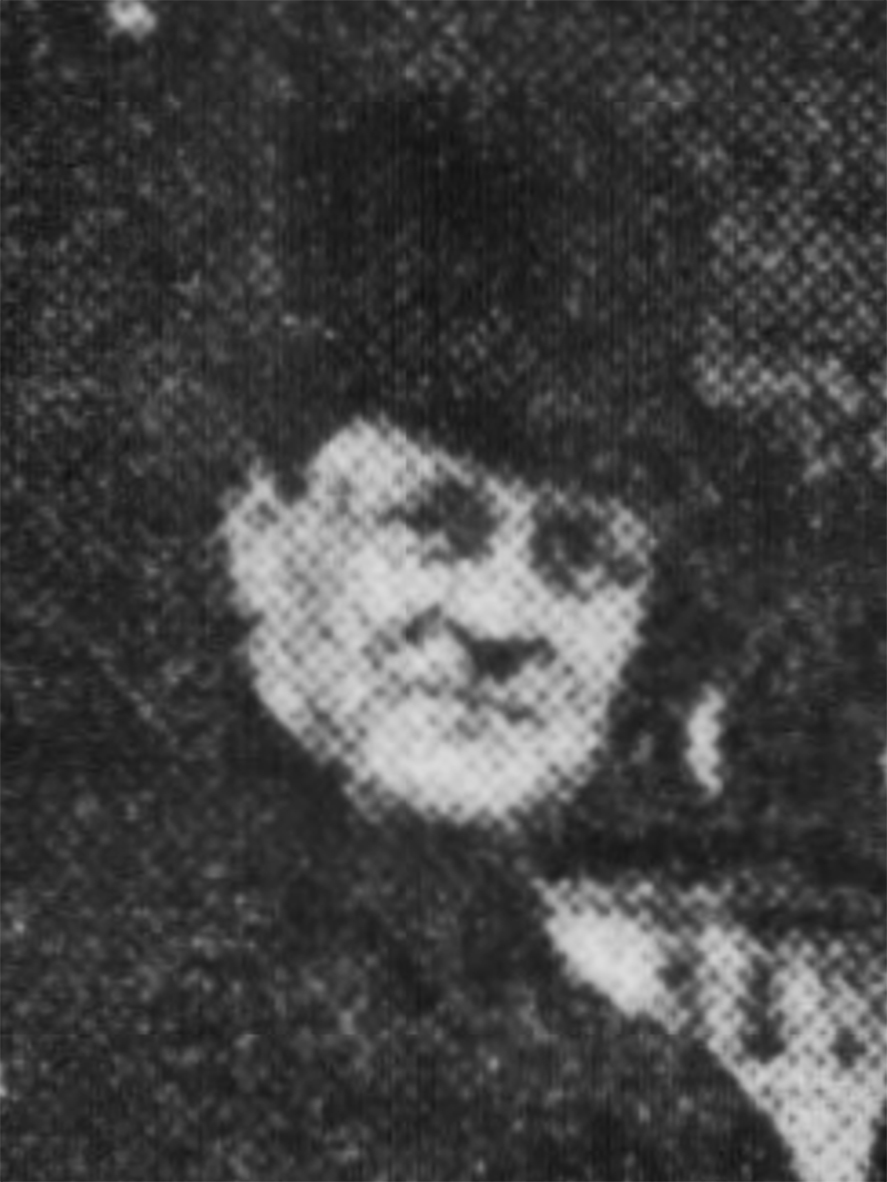
- Bishop in 1911

Member of the California State Assembly from the 77th district
- In office January 2, 1911 – January 6, 1913
- Preceded by: Richard Melrose
- Succeeded by: William H. Ellis
- In office January 7, 1907 – January 4, 1909
- Preceded by: Edward Russell Amerige
- Succeeded by: Richard Melrose

Personal details
- Born: May 23, 1874 Chicago, Illinois, U.S.
- Died: October 31, 1927 (aged 53) Santa Ana, California, U.S.
- Party: Republican

Military service
- Branch/service: United States Army
- Battles/wars: Spanish–American War

Clyde Bishop (May 23, 1874 – October 31, 1927) was an American politician who served in the California State Assembly for the 77th district from 1907 to 1907, got re-elected again serving from 1911 to 1913 and during the Spanish–American War he served in the United States Army.
