= Brian Jones (politician) =

American politician

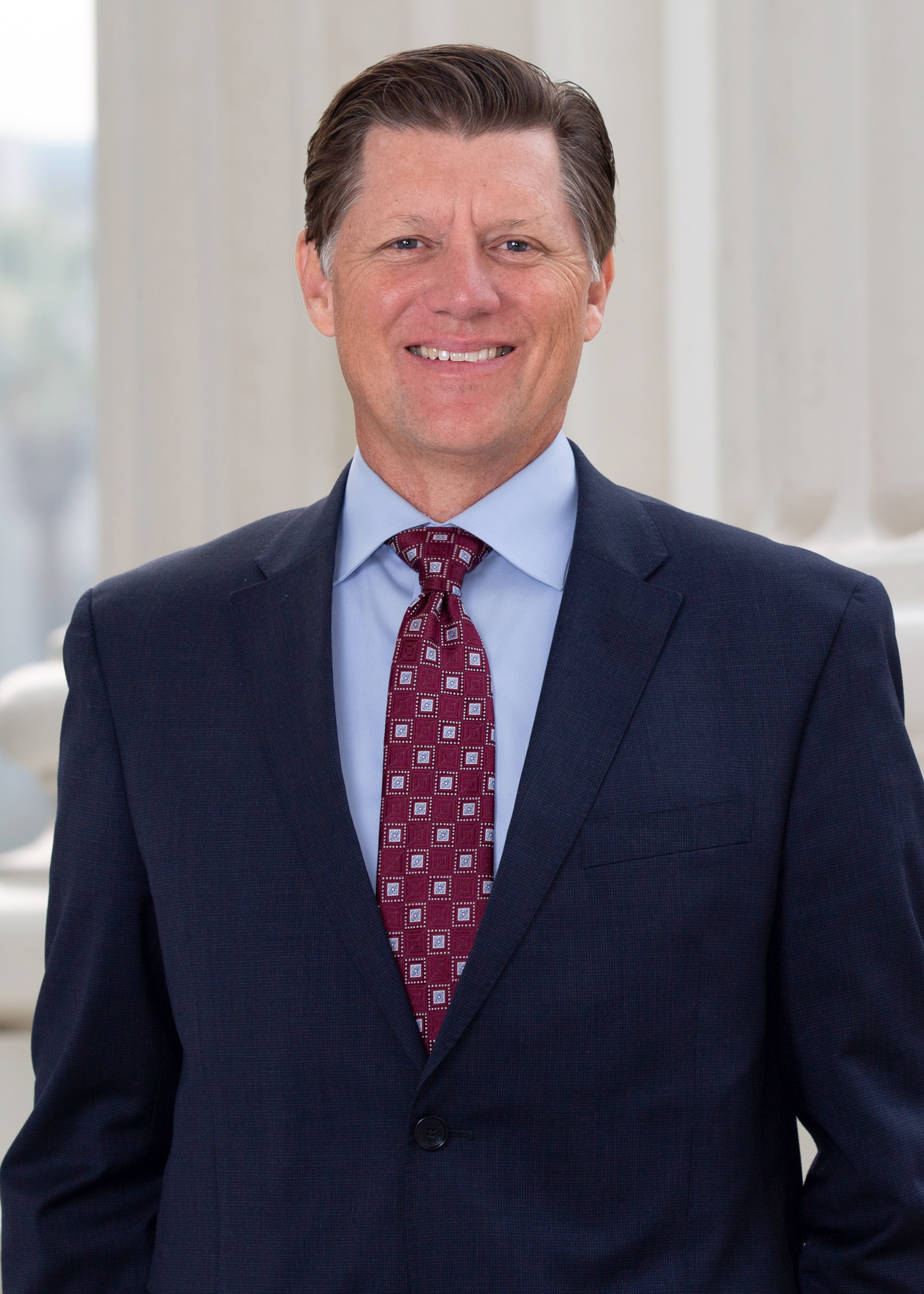
- Official portrait, 2018

Minority Leader of the California Senate
- In office December 5, 2022 – November 4, 2026
- Preceded by: Scott Wilk
- Succeeded by: Roger Niello

Member of the California State Senate
- Incumbent
- Assumed office December 3, 2018
- Preceded by: Joel Anderson
- Constituency: 38th district (2018–2022); 40th district (2022–present)

Member of the California State Assembly
- In office December 6, 2010 – December 5, 2016
- Preceded by: Joel Anderson
- Succeeded by: Randy Voepel
- Constituency: 77th district (2010–2012); 71st district (2012–2016)

Personal details
- Born: August 9, 1968 (age 58) Austin, Texas, U.S.
- Party: Republican
- Spouse: Heather
- Children: 3
- Education: Grossmont College (attended); San Diego State University (BBA)

Brian W. Jones (born August 9, 1968) is an American politician serving in the California State Senate. A Republican, he represents the 40th district, encompassing most of inland San Diego County. He previously served in the California State Assembly, representing the 71st district, also encompassing most of inland San Diego County. Prior to being elected to the state assembly, he was a member of the Santee City Council.

== Early life and education ==
Born in Austin, Texas, Jones moved to California in 1978. Jones attended Santee Elementary, Cajon Park Middle School graduated from Santana High School where he was involved in Student Government and continued his education at Grossmont College before earning a bachelor's degree in business administration from San Diego State University in 1991.

== Career ==
Prior to entering politics, he served as Commissioner of the Mobile Home Fair Practices Commission, President of the Kiwanis Key Club, and Secretary of San Diego 4-Wheelers, and a member of the Santee Parks and Recreation Committee. Professionally, Jones was a manager at Domino's Pizza and a licensed real estate salesperson.

=== Santee City Council ===
Jones was elected to the Santee City Council in November 2002. While on the City Council, he served as a representative on the Mission Trails Regional Park Task Force, Heartland Fire Training Authority Commission, the Santee Elementary School District Conference Committee, the Santee Library Committee, the Goodan Ranch Policy Committee, and as an alternate representative on the Metropolitan Transit Services Board. In addition, he also served on the board of directors for the East County Boys & Girls Club.

As a member of the Santee City Council, Jones oversaw the planning and approval of the Santee Town Center Park and YMCA Aquatic Center.

=== California State Assembly ===
Jones was elected to the California State Assembly in 2010, as a representative of the 77th Assembly District, located in East San Diego County, California. He campaigned on a number of conservative issues, including private sector job creation, which he stated includes "getting government out of the way of the free enterprise market—lower taxes on individuals and corporations, and two, reducing the regulatory burden that the state government is placing on businesses that is chasing them out of the state."

As a member of the Assembly, Jones has expressed support for the Second Amendment, opposition to illegal immigration, and a desire to see reforms aimed at curtailing the influence of public-sector labor unions. His signature piece of legislation, AB 860, would "prohibit direct political contributions by corporations and unions to political candidates" and "prohibit government employers to deduct from government worker paychecks money that is then used to engage in political activity."

He testified before the State Board of Equalization in opposition to the proposed State Responsibility Fire Fee, and has been a supporter of the Stop Special Interest Money initiative and an effort to repeal the California DREAM Act.

In 2011, Governor Jerry Brown signed Jones' bill, AB 959, into law. The new law will "streamline the CalWORKs process for recipients and counties throughout California."

=== Committee assignments ===
- Vice Chair, Business, Professions, & Consumer Protection
- Governmental Organization
- Utilities & Commerce
- Assembly Legislative Ethics

=== California State Senate ===
In 2025, Jones announced a "Safety Before Criminal Sanctuary" bill to weaken the California's Values Act (SB54) of 2017 that limits local law enforcement's cooperation with the U.S. Immigration and Customs Enforcement and strengthen the trust of immigrant communities when reporting crimes. Attending the press conference were Republican County Supervisor Joel Anderson, El Cajon Mayor Bill Wells, Senator Rosilicie Ochoa Bogh, Vista Mayor John Franklin, San Diego County Sheriff Kelly Martinez, Riverside County Sheriff Chad Bianco who had just announced he was running for governor and at least three dozen protesters including a speaker from the American Friends Service Committee.

== Personal life ==
Jones lives in Santee, California, with his wife Heather and their three children.

== Electoral history ==
=== California State Assembly ===
2010 California State Assembly 77th district election
Primary election
| Party | Candidate | Votes | % |
|---|---|---|---|
| Republican | Brian Jones | 20,156 | 43.1 |
| Republican | Bill Wells | 13,411 | 28.6 |
| Republican | Christine Rubin | 13,265 | 28.3 |
| Total votes | | 46,832 | 100.0 |
General election
| Republican | Brian Jones | 82,909 | 62.4 |
| Democratic | Mark Hanson | 43,674 | 32.9 |
| Libertarian | Richard Belitz | 6,228 | 4.7 |
| Total votes | | 132,811 | 100.0 |
| Republican hold | | | |

2012 California State Assembly 71st district election
Primary election
| Party | Candidate | Votes | % |
|---|---|---|---|
| Republican | Brian Jones (incumbent) | 36,424 | 46.7 |
| Democratic | Patrick J. Hurley | 23,510 | 30.2 |
| Republican | John McLaughlin | 17,987 | 23.1 |
| Total votes | | 77,921 | 100.0 |
General election
| Republican | Brian Jones (incumbent) | 106,663 | 63.1 |
| Democratic | Patrick J. Hurley | 62,330 | 36.9 |
| Total votes | | 168,993 | 100.0 |
| Republican hold | | | |

2014 California State Assembly 71st district election
Primary election
| Party | Candidate | Votes | % |
|---|---|---|---|
| Republican | Brian Jones (incumbent) | 40,326 | 76.1 |
| Republican | Tony Teora | 12,573 | 23.7 |
| Democratic | Howard L. Katz (write-in) | 109 | 0.2 |
| Total votes | | 53,008 | 100.0 |
General election
| Republican | Brian Jones (incumbent) | 64,613 | 70.6 |
| Republican | Tony Teora | 26,935 | 29.4 |
| Total votes | | 91,548 | 100.0 |
| Republican hold | | | |

=== California State Senate ===
2018 California State Senate 38th district election
Primary election
| Party | Candidate | Votes | % |
|---|---|---|---|
| Republican | Brian Jones | 114,270 | 57.2 |
| Democratic | Jeff Griffith | 79,862 | 40.0 |
| Libertarian | Antonio Salguero | 5,576 | 2.8 |
| Total votes | | 199,708 | 100.0 |
General election
| Republican | Brian Jones | 187,345 | 53.0 |
| Democratic | Jeff Griffith | 166,092 | 47.0 |
| Total votes | | 353,437 | 100.0 |
| Republican hold | | | |

2022 California State Senate 40th district election
Primary election
| Party | Candidate | Votes | % |
|---|---|---|---|
| Republican | Brian Jones (incumbent) | 113,400 | 54.4 |
| Democratic | Joseph C. Rocha | 94,960 | 45.6 |
| Total votes | | 208,360 | 100.0 |
General election
| Republican | Brian Jones (incumbent) | 170,109 | 53.1 |
| Democratic | Joseph C. Rocha | 149,948 | 46.9 |
| Total votes | | 320,057 | 100.0 |
| Republican gain from Democratic | | | |

California Senate
| Preceded by Scott Wilk | Minority Leader of the California Senate; 2022–present | Incumbent |
