= Jay La Suer =

American politician

Member of the California State Assembly from the 77th district
- In office December 4, 2000 - November 30, 2006
- Preceded by: Steven C. Baldwin
- Succeeded by: Joel Anderson

Personal details
- Born: January 24, 1940 (age 86) Hutchinson, Kansas, U.S.
- Party: Republican
- Spouse: Lynn (m. 1963)
- Children: 2
- Education: San Diego State University

Military service
- Branch/service: United States Army
- Years of service: 1958-1961

Jay La Suer (born January 24, 1940, in Hutchinson, Kansas, US) is a Republican politician from the state of California, US.

== Education ==
La Super is a graduate of FBI National Academy. La Suer earned a BA in Public Administration from San Diego State University.

== Career ==
La Suer was in the United States Army from 1958 to 1961 and the San Diego Police Department from 1961 to 1967.

In 1970, La Suer became an undersheriff with the San Diego County Sheriff's Department until his retirement 1994.

La Suer was consultant for the Association of Builders and Contractors as senior director of education. Prior to serving in the California State Legislature, LaSuer was elected councilman and mayor in La Mesa, serving during 1990–2000.

La Suer was first elected to the California State Assembly in 2000 and served until term limited out of office in 2006. He represented District 77, which includes the eastern San Diego County cities of El Cajon, La Mesa, Santee, and eastern San Diego.

== Personal life ==
La Suer's wife is Lynn. They have two daughters. La Suer and his family live in LA Mesa, California.

Political offices
Preceded by Steve Baldwin	California State Assemblyman, 77th District; 2000-2006	Succeeded by Joel Anderson
