= California's 77th State Assembly district =

American legislative district

Current assemblymember
Tasha Boerner; D–Encinitas
- Population (2020): 490,196
- Registered voters: 325,240
- Registration: 42.64% Democratic; 26.00% Republican; 24.77% No party preference

California's 77th State Assembly district is one of 80 California State Assembly districts. It is currently represented by Democrat Tasha Boerner of Encinitas. The district encompasses much of the San Diego County coastline, stretching from Carlsbad in the north to Coronado and Downtown San Diego in the south.

== District profile ==
The district runs along the San Diego County coast from Carlsbad south through Encinitas, Solana Beach, and Del Mar, and continues through the coastal neighborhoods of the city of San Diego, including La Jolla, University City, Pacific Beach, Mission Beach, Ocean Beach, Point Loma, and Downtown San Diego, as well as the city of Coronado.

The current district boundaries were drawn by the California Citizens Redistricting Commission in 2021, following the 2020 Census, and first took effect for the 2022 elections. The redistricting substantially redrew the 77th district, shifting it from an inland district centered on Marine Corps Air Station Miramar and Poway to a coastal district running from Carlsbad to Downtown San Diego. The previous inland territory was largely redistricted into the new 76th district.

San Diego County

- Carlsbad
- Coronado
- Del Mar
- Encinitas
- San Diego (portions, including La Jolla, University City, Pacific Beach, Mission Beach, Ocean Beach, Point Loma, and Downtown San Diego)
- Solana Beach

== Election results from statewide races ==
Year	Office	Results
2021	Recall	No 56.8 – 43.2%
2020	President	Biden 60.4 – 37.3%
2018	Governor	Newsom 54.3 – 45.7%
2018	Senator	Feinstein 56.2 – 43.8%
2016	President	Clinton 55.2 – 38.9%
2016	Senator	Harris 61.2 – 38.8%
2014	Governor	Kashkari 51.0 – 49.0%
2012	President	Romney 49.8 – 48.2%
2012	Senator	Feinstein 50.8 – 49.2%

== List of assembly members representing the district ==
Due to redistricting, the 77th district has been moved around different parts of the state. The current iteration resulted from the 2021 redistricting by the California Citizens Redistricting Commission. Tasha Boerner was first elected to the 76th district in 2018 and moved to the redrawn 77th district for the 2022 election following redistricting.

Assembly members	Party	Years served	Counties represented	Notes
Henry T. Hazard	Republican	January 5, 1885 – January 3, 1887	Los Angeles	
George Washington Knox	Republican	January 3, 1887 – January 7, 1889	Los Angeles	
James M. Damron	Republican	January 7, 1889 – January 5, 1891	Los Angeles	
John R. Mathews	Democratic	January 5, 1891 – January 2, 1893	Los Angeles	
Charles Omar Barker	Republican	January 2, 1893 – January 7, 1895	San Bernardino	
Edwin W. Freeman	Republican	January 7, 1895 – January 4, 1897	Riverside	
F. T. Lindenberger	Republican	January 4, 1897 – January 2, 1899	Riverside	
Andrew Staley Milice	Republican	January 2, 1899 – January 5, 1903	Riverside	
Edward Russell Amerige	Republican	January 5, 1903 – January 7, 1907	Orange	
Clyde Bishop	Republican	January 7, 1907 – January 4, 1909	Orange	
Richard Melrose	Republican	January 4, 1909 – January 2, 1911	Orange	
Clyde Bishop	Republican	January 2, 1911 – January 6, 1913	Orange	
William H. Ellis	Republican	January 6, 1913 – January 4, 1915	Riverside	
William A. Avey	Progressive	January 4, 1915 – January 8, 1917	Riverside	
Chester M. Kline	Republican	January 8, 1917 – January 5, 1925	Riverside	
Alfred C. Murray	Republican	January 5, 1925 – December 21, 1926	Riverside	Died in office after winning his 2nd term. Died in car crash.
Vacant		December 21, 1926 – March 3, 1927	Riverside	
John E. Wherrell	Nonpartisan	March 3, 1927 – January 7, 1929	Riverside	Sworn in after winning special election.
Chester M. Kline	Republican	January 7, 1929 – January 5, 1931	Riverside	
Myron D. Witter	Republican	January 5, 1931 – February 19, 1931	Imperial	Died in office. Died while after getting an operation for cancer.
Vacant		February 19, 1931 – March 25, 1931	Imperial	
Samuel E. Robinson	Democratic	March 25, 1931 – January 7, 1935	Imperial	Sworn in after winning special election. Ran as a Republican for his 2nd term.
Samuel E. Robinson	Republican	March 25, 1931 – January 7, 1935	Imperial	
Clarence R. Walker	Republican	January 7, 1935 – January 6, 1941	Imperial	
Harvey E. Hastain	Republican	January 6, 1941 – January 8, 1945	Imperial	
George Roy Butters	Republican	January 8, 1945 – April 24, 1951	Imperial	Died in office. Died from his injuries 3 months after his car accident.
Vacant		April 24, 1951 – January 5, 1953	Imperial	
Edwin S. Bulen	Republican	January 5, 1953 – January 3, 1955	San Diego	
Sheridan N. Hegland	Democratic	January 3, 1955 – January 7, 1963	San Diego	
Richard J. Donovan	Republican	January 7, 1963 – July 15, 1966	San Diego	Resigned to become a Judge for the San Diego County Municipal Court.
Vacant		July 15, 1966 – January 2, 1967	San Diego	
Wadie P. Deddeh	Democratic	January 2, 1967 – November 30, 1974	San Diego	
Bob Wilson	Democratic	December 2, 1974 – November 30, 1976	San Diego	
James L. Ellis	Republican	December 6, 1976 – November 30, 1980	San Diego	
Larry Stirling	Republican	December 1, 1980 – November 30, 1988	San Diego	
Carol Bentley	Republican	December 5, 1988 – November 30, 1992	San Diego	
Thomas Maximus Connolly III	Democratic	December 7, 1992 – November 30, 1994	San Diego	
Steven C. Baldwin	Republican	December 5, 1994 – November 30, 2000	San Diego	
Jay La Suer	Republican	December 4, 2000 – November 30, 2006	San Diego	
Joel Anderson	Republican	December 4, 2006 – November 30, 2010	San Diego	
Brian Jones	Republican	December 6, 2010 – November 30, 2012	San Diego	
Brian Maienschein	Republican	December 3, 2012 – November 30, 2022	San Diego	Changed his party to Democrat in 2019. Redistricted into the 76th district in 2022.
Brian Maienschein	Democratic	December 3, 2012 – November 30, 2022	San Diego	Changed his party to Democrat in 2019. Redistricted into the 76th district in 2022.
Tasha Boerner	Democratic	December 5, 2022 – present	San Diego	Previously represented the 76th district (2018–2022). Moved to the redrawn 77th following 2021 redistricting.

== Election results (1990–present) ==
=== 2024 ===
2024 California State Assembly 77th district election
Primary election
Party	Candidate	Votes	%
Democratic	Tasha Boerner (incumbent)	72,606	56.9
Republican	James Browne	49,017	38.4
Democratic	Henny Kupferstein	5,977	4.7
Total votes		127,600	100.0
General election
Democratic	Tasha Boerner (incumbent)	154,202	60.4
Republican	James Browne	100,954	39.6
Total votes		255,156	100.0
Democratic hold			

=== 2022 ===
2022 California State Assembly 77th district election
Primary election
Party	Candidate	Votes	%
Democratic	Tasha Boerner (incumbent)	78,673	60.9
Republican	Dan Downey	50,530	39.1
Total votes		129,203	100.0
General election
Democratic	Tasha Boerner (incumbent)	121,447	60.4
Republican	Dan Downey	79,637	39.6
Total votes		201,084	100.0
Democratic hold			

=== 2020 ===
2020 California State Assembly 77th district election
Primary election
Party	Candidate	Votes	%
Democratic	Brian Maienschein (incumbent)	86,998	57.5
Republican	June Yang Cutter	64,384	42.5
Total votes		151,382	100.0
General election
Democratic	Brian Maienschein (incumbent)	149,367	55.8
Republican	June Yang Cutter	118,396	44.2
Total votes		267,763	100.0
Democratic hold			

=== 2018 ===
2018 California State Assembly 77th district election
Primary election
Party	Candidate	Votes	%
Republican	Brian Maienschein (incumbent)	63,269	56.1
Democratic	Sunday Gover	49,554	43.9
Total votes		112,823	100.0
General election
Republican	Brian Maienschein (incumbent)	99,880	50.2
Democratic	Sunday Gover	99,273	49.8
Total votes		199,153	100.0
Republican hold			

=== 2016 ===
2016 California State Assembly 77th district election
Primary election
Party	Candidate	Votes	%
Republican	Brian Maienschein (incumbent)	68,812	57.7
Democratic	Melinda K. Vásquez	50,345	42.3
Total votes		119,157	100.0
General election
Republican	Brian Maienschein (incumbent)	121,140	57.8
Democratic	Melinda K. Vásquez	88,344	42.2
Total votes		209,484	100.0
Republican hold			

=== 2014 ===
2014 California State Assembly 77th district election
Primary election
Party	Candidate	Votes	%
Republican	Brian Maienschein (incumbent)	57,147	70.6
Democratic	Ruben "RJ" Hernandez	23,821	29.4
Total votes		80,968	100.0
General election
Republican	Brian Maienschein (incumbent)	82,987	65.8
Democratic	Ruben "RJ" Hernandez	43,038	34.2
Total votes		126,025	100.0
Republican hold			

=== 2012 ===
2012 California State Assembly 77th district election
Primary election
Party	Candidate	Votes	%
Republican	Brian Maienschein	45,071	47.3
Democratic	Ruben "RJ" Hernandez	23,075	24.2
Republican	Dustin Steiner	14,406	15.1
No party preference	Greg Laskaris	12,639	13.3
Total votes		95,191	100.0
General election
Republican	Brian Maienschein	114,314	60.1
Democratic	Ruben "RJ" Hernandez	75,824	39.9
Total votes		190,138	100.0
Republican hold			

=== 2010 ===
2010 California State Assembly 77th district election
Party	Candidate	Votes	%
Republican	Brian Jones	82,909	62.5
Democratic	Mark Hanson	43,674	32.9
Libertarian	Richard Belitz	6,228	4.6
Total votes		132,811	100.0
Republican hold			

=== 2008 ===
2008 California State Assembly 77th district election
Party	Candidate	Votes	%
Republican	Joel Anderson (incumbent)	92,621	55.4
Democratic	Raymond Lutz	64,949	38.9
Libertarian	Rich Belitz	9,503	5.7
Total votes		167,073	100.0
Republican hold			

=== 2006 ===
2006 California State Assembly 77th district election
Party	Candidate	Votes	%
Republican	Joel Anderson	69,436	60.6
Democratic	Christopher Larkin	41,292	36.0
Libertarian	Rich Belitz	3,921	3.4
Total votes		114,649	100.0
Republican hold			

=== 2004 ===
2004 California State Assembly 77th district election
Party	Candidate	Votes	%
Republican	Jay La Suer (incumbent)	106,827	64.8
Democratic	Christopher R. Larkin	53,051	32.2
Libertarian	Virgil (Randy) Hall Ii	4,870	3.0
Total votes		164,748	100.0
Republican hold			

=== 2002 ===
2002 California State Assembly 77th district election
Party	Candidate	Votes	%
Republican	Jay La Suer (incumbent)	70,315	66.5
Democratic	Sarah Lowery	30,270	28.6
Libertarian	Virgil (Randy) Hall II	5,247	4.9
Total votes		105,832	100.0
Republican hold			

=== 2000 ===
2000 California State Assembly 77th district election
Party	Candidate	Votes	%
Republican	Jay La Suer	66,645	52.3
Democratic	Todd Keegan	52,554	41.2
Libertarian	Michael S. Metti	8,351	6.5
Total votes		127,550	100.0
Republican hold			

=== 1998 ===
1998 California State Assembly 77th district election
Party	Candidate	Votes	%
Republican	Steve Baldwin (incumbent)	56,622	57.8
Democratic	Margaret "Marge" Carlson	37,962	38.8
Libertarian	Elizabeth Myers	3,378	3.4
Total votes		97,962	100.0
Republican hold			

=== 1996 ===
1996 California State Assembly 77th district election
Party	Candidate	Votes	%
Republican	Steve Baldwin (incumbent)	68,475	56.0
Democratic	Janet Gastil	48,714	39.8
Libertarian	Elizabeth Meyers	5,178	4.2
Total votes		122,367	100.0
Republican hold			

=== 1994 ===
1994 California State Assembly 77th district election
Party	Candidate	Votes	%
Republican	Steve Baldwin	53,442	55.8
Democratic	Tom Connolly (incumbent)	42,389	44.2
Total votes		95,831	100.0
Republican gain from Democratic			

=== 1992 ===
1992 California State Assembly 77th district election
Party	Candidate	Votes	%
Democratic	Tom Connolly	64,143	47.8
Republican	Steve Baldwin	59,884	44.6
Libertarian	Jeff Bishop	8,122	6.1
Peace and Freedom	Reed Kroopkin	2,047	1.5
Total votes		134,196	100.0
Democratic gain from Republican			

=== 1990 ===
1990 California State Assembly 77th district election
Party	Candidate	Votes	%
Republican	Carol Bentley Ellis (incumbent)	54,438	53.7
Democratic	Thomas M. Connolly	35,514	35.0
Libertarian	Joel Denis	6,343	6.3
Peace and Freedom	Arthur Edelman	5,068	5.0
Total votes		101,363	100.0
Republican hold			

== See also ==
- California State Assembly
- California State Assembly districts
- Districts in California
- California's 76th State Assembly district (contains much of the pre-2022 77th district territory)
