= A Stolen Life: A Memoir =

2011 true crime book

- First edition cover
- Author: Jaycee Dugard
- Audio read by: Jaycee Dugard
- Language: English
- Subject: Story of the kidnapping of Jaycee Dugard in 1991
- Genre: Nonfiction; memoir; true crime
- Publisher: Simon & Schuster
- Publication date: July 12, 2011
- Publication place: United States
- Media type: Trade paperback; unabridged audio book
- Pages: 314
- ISBN: 978-1-4516-2918-7
- OCLC: 880324583
- Followed by: Freedom: My Book of Firsts

A Stolen Life: A Memoir is a true crime book by American kidnapping victim Jaycee Lee Dugard about the 18 years she spent while sequestered and enslaved with her captors in Antioch, California. The memoir dissects what she did to survive and cope mentally with extreme abuse. The book reached No. 1 on Amazon's sales rankings a day before release and topped The New York Times Best Seller list hardcover nonfiction for six weeks after release.

A Stolen Life was published on July 12, 2011, by Simon & Schuster. In 2016, Dugard followed up A Stolen Life by publishing Freedom: My Book of Firsts, dealing with her life after captivity.

== Narrative ==
In 1991, eleven-year-old Jaycee Dugard was kidnapped by Phillip and Nancy Garrido, who tased her with a stun gun before dragging her into their car as Dugard walked to her school bus stop near her home in Meyers, which is south of South Lake Tahoe, California. While in captivity, Garrido raped her for years, which resulted in her giving birth to two daughters. Despite a sustained investigation, Dugard was not found until 2009, eighteen years after her abduction.

A Stolen Life is the story of Dugard's 18-year ordeal and was written as part of her therapy with Rebecca Bailey, who specializes in post-trauma family reunification. Dugard further says that she wrote the memoir to provide an in-depth look at what captives like her have endured, and to reach other survivors.

Before her abduction, Dugard states that she had dealt with an abusive stepfather, and her biological father was absent. After she was rescued, Dugard and her family were awarded a settlement of US$20 million (equivalent to $28.8 million in 2025) for the failure of the California Department of Corrections and Rehabilitation parole officers assigned to Garrido, a convicted felon, to recognize the situation Dugard was involved in, specifically her enslavement.

== Critical reception ==
The publisher Simon & Schuster initially printed 200,000 copies, and later printed another 15,000 to meet demand. A day before its official release the book reached the top of Amazon's sales rankings.

Maria L. La Ganga, writing for the Los Angeles Times wrote that "A Stolen Life chronicles her growth from victim to survivor, from terror to strength. While it is also an indictment of the parole system and a meditation on loneliness."

Janet Maslin, reviewing the memoir for The New York Times described Dugard as courageous and dignified in recounting such a traumatic life experience.
