= Kidnapping of Jaycee Dugard =

1991 American kidnapping case

- Childhood photo of Dugard
- Location: 38°0′31″N 121°46′16″W: Kidnapping: Meyers, California; Confinement: 1554 Walnut Avenue, Antioch, California; Reappearance: University of California, Berkeley
- Date: June 10, 1991 – August 26, 2009
- Attack type: Child abduction; false imprisonment; child rape
- Victim: Jaycee Lee Dugard
- Perpetrators: Phillip Craig Garrido; Nancy Garrido
- Motive: Sexual gratification
- Verdict: Pleaded guilty
- Convictions: Kidnapping; rape by force
- Sentence: Phillip: 431 years to life imprisonment; Nancy: 36 years to life in prison

On June 10, 1991, Jaycee Lee Dugard, an eleven-year-old girl, was abducted from a street while walking to a school bus stop in Meyers, California, United States. Searches began immediately after Dugard's disappearance, but no reliable leads were generated, even though several people witnessed the kidnapping. Dugard remained missing for over 18 years until 2009, when a convicted sex offender, Phillip Garrido, visited the campus of the University of California, Berkeley, accompanied by two adolescent girls, who were later discovered to be the biological daughters of Garrido and Dugard, on August 24 and 25 of that year. The unusual behavior of the trio sparked an investigation that led Garrido's parole officer, Edward Santos Jr, to order Garrido to take the two girls to a parole office in Concord, California, on August 26. Garrido was accompanied by a woman who was eventually identified as Dugard.

Garrido and his wife, Nancy, were arrested after Dugard's reappearance. On April 28, 2011, they pleaded guilty to kidnapping and raping Dugard. Investigators revealed that Dugard had been kept in concealed tents, sheds, and lean-tos in an area behind the Garridos' house at 1554 Walnut Avenue in Antioch, California, where Phillip repeatedly raped Dugard during the first six years of her captivity. During her confinement, Dugard gave birth to two daughters, who were aged eleven and fifteen at the time of Dugard's reappearance. On June 2, 2011, Phillip Garrido was sentenced to 431 years to life imprisonment; Nancy Garrido was sentenced to 36 years to life. Garrido is a person of interest in at least one other missing persons case in the San Francisco Bay Area.

As Phillip Garrido had been on parole for a 1976 rape at the time of her kidnapping, Dugard sued the state of California, which had taken over his parole supervision from the federal government in 1999, on account of the numerous lapses by law enforcement that contributed to her continued captivity and sexual assault. In 2010, the state of California awarded the Dugard family US$20 million (equivalent to $28.8 million in 2025). Dugard also sued the federal government on similar grounds pertaining to Garrido's time as a federal parolee, but in a 2–1 ruling, the 9th U.S. Circuit Court of Appeals dismissed that suit because Garrido had not victimized her at the time he was placed under the supervision of the federal parole system and that as a result of this, "there was no way to anticipate she would become his victim." In 2011, Dugard wrote an autobiography titled A Stolen Life: A Memoir. Her second book, Freedom: My Book of Firsts, was published in 2016.

== Background ==
=== Dugard family ===
Jaycee Dugard was born May 3, 1980, in South Lake Tahoe, California. Her mother, Terry Dugard, and her biological father, Ken Slayton, had met while both were on camping vacations in Arizona and had a brief relationship while there. Slayton was not involved in her life, nor in the investigation that followed her kidnapping. When Dugard was seven, her mother married a carpet contractor named Carl Probyn and gave birth to Dugard's half-sister, Shayna, in 1990. Although Dugard was close to her mother and sister, she was never close to Probyn. In September 1990, Dugard's family moved from Arcadia, California, in Los Angeles County, to Meyers, a rural town south of South Lake Tahoe, because they thought it was a safer community. At the time of the abduction, Dugard was in the fifth grade, and anticipated an upcoming field trip.

=== Kidnappers ===
Phillip Garrido
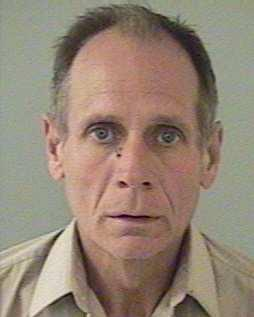
- Mug shot
- Born: April 5, 1951 (age 75); Pittsburg, California, U.S.
- Occupations: Printer; Self-styled evangelist
- Height: 6 ft 4 in (193 cm)
- Status: Incarcerated
- Criminal charges: Kidnapping, rape, false imprisonment
- Penalty: Serving 431 years to life

Details
- Imprisoned at: California State Prison, Corcoran

Nancy Garrido
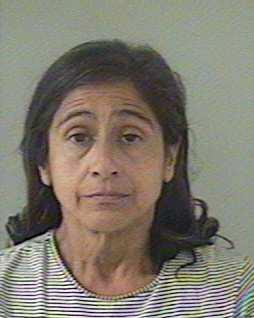
- Mug shot
- Born: Nancy Bocanegra; July 18, 1955 (age 71); Seguin, Texas, U.S.
- Occupations: Nursing aide; Physical therapy aide
- Status: Incarcerated
- Criminal charges: Kidnapping, rape, false imprisonment
- Penalty: Serving 36 years to life

Details
- Imprisoned at: California Institution for Women

The primary offender, Phillip Craig Garrido, was born in Pittsburg, California, on April 5, 1951. He grew up in Brentwood, where he graduated from Liberty High School in 1969. Garrido's father Manuel later stated that his son had been a "good boy" as a child, but changed radically after a serious motorcycle accident as a teenager. He turned to drug use – primarily methamphetamine and LSD.

In later court testimony, Garrido admitted that he habitually masturbated in his car by the side of elementary and high schools while watching girls. In 1972 he was arrested and charged with repeatedly raping a 14-year-old girl after giving her barbiturates, but the case did not go to trial after the girl declined to testify. The following year, he married his high school classmate, Christine Murphy, who accused him of domestic violence and alleged that he kidnapped her when she tried to leave him.

In 1976, Garrido kidnapped 25-year-old Katherine Callaway in South Lake Tahoe, California. He took her to a Reno, Nevada, warehouse, where he raped her for five and a half hours. When a police officer noticed a car parked outside the warehouse and then a broken lock on its door, he knocked on the door and was greeted by Garrido. Callaway then emerged and asked for help. Garrido was promptly arrested.

In a 1976 court-ordered psychiatric evaluation, Garrido was diagnosed as a "sexual deviant and chronic drug abuser". The psychiatrist recommended that a neurological examination be conducted as Garrido's chronic drug use could be "responsible in part" for his "mixed" or "multiple" sexual deviations. He was evaluated by neurologist Albert F. Peterman, whose diagnostic impression was that Garrido showed "considerable evidence of anxiety and depression and personality disorder." He was convicted on March 9, 1977, and began serving a fifty-year federal sentence on June 30 of that year at Leavenworth Penitentiary in Kansas.

At Leavenworth, Garrido met Nancy Bocanegra, his future accomplice/secondary offender in Dugard's kidnapping, who was visiting her uncle, another prisoner. On October 5, 1981, he and Bocanegra were married at the prison. On January 22, 1988, Garrido was released from Leavenworth to Nevada State Prison, where he served seven months of a five-years-to-life Nevada sentence. Having been granted parole, he was then transferred to federal parole authorities in Contra Costa County, California, on August 26, 1988. Garrido and his wife moved to the city of Antioch and lived in the home of his elderly mother, who suffered from dementia. As a parolee, Garrido wore a GPS-enabled ankle bracelet and was regularly visited by parole officers, local sheriff's deputies, and federal agents.

== Abduction ==
On June 10, 1991, Dugard's mother, who worked as a typesetter at a print house, left for work early in the day. Dugard, who was 11 years old at the time, wore her favorite all-pink outfit as she walked up the hill from her house, against traffic, to catch the school bus. When she was halfway up the hill, a gray car approached her. She thought that the man driving the car was stopping to ask for directions.

The driver, Phillip Garrido, rolled down the window and tased Dugard unconscious with a stun gun before abducting her. His wife, Nancy, dragged Dugard into the car and removed her clothing, leaving only a butterfly-shaped ring that Dugard would hide from them for the next 18 years. Nancy covered Dugard with a blanket and held her down as Dugard drifted in and out of consciousness during the three-hour drive to the Garridos' property, 120 miles (190 km) away in Antioch. The only time Dugard spoke was when she pleaded that her parents could not afford a ransom. The district attorney in the Dugard case believed that Nancy had scouted Dugard as a prize for Garrido.

Probyn witnessed the abduction of his stepdaughter from within sight of their home. He saw two people in a mid-sized gray car – possibly a Mercury Monarch – make a U-turn at the school bus stop where Dugard was waiting, and a woman forcing Dugard into the car. He chased after them on a bicycle but was unable to overtake the vehicle. Some of Dugard's classmates were also witnesses to the abduction. Initial suspects included Probyn and Ken Slayton, Dugard's biological father, though they did not know each other and Slayton had only had a brief relationship with Dugard's mother in 1979, not knowing he had a child. Probyn took and passed several polygraph tests, and Slayton was also quickly cleared of suspicion. The kidnapping led to the breakup of Terry and Carl Probyn's marriage.

== Search effort ==
Within hours of Dugard's disappearance, local and national media in South Lake Tahoe covered the story. In the following days, dozens of local volunteers assisted in the search effort, which involved nearly every resource within the community. Over the next weeks, tens of thousands of fliers and posters were mailed to businesses throughout the United States. Since Dugard's favorite color was pink, the town was blanketed in pink ribbons as a reminder of her disappearance, and as a demonstration of support for her family by the community.

Terry Probyn founded a group called Jaycee's Hope, which directed the volunteer and fundraising efforts. Cassette tapes of the song "Jaycee Lee", along with T-shirts, sweatshirts, and buttons, were sold to raise money for poster materials, postage, printing, and related expenses. Child Quest International and the National Center for Missing & Exploited Children were involved in the effort. A reward was offered, which was noted on the posters and fliers. The kidnapping case attracted nationwide attention and was featured on the June 14, 1991, episode of the Fox television show America's Most Wanted. The ensuing years were a continuous effort of child safety awareness, fundraising events, and candlelight vigils marking Dugard's disappearance, keeping her story in the public awareness.

== Captivity ==
Upon arriving at the Garridos' home in an unincorporated area of Antioch, the Garridos took Dugard, her head still covered with a blanket, behind their house, where they had constructed a series of dilapidated tents and sheds. Garrido placed Dugard inside a tiny shed that had been soundproofed. Dugard later stated in her memoir and an interview with ABC News that upon arrival, Garrido handcuffed her and left her naked in the shed, which he bolted shut, warning her that trained Doberman Pinschers outside the shed would attack her if she tried to escape. Right after the abduction, Garrido forced Dugard into a shower with him, which was the first time she had been exposed to an unclothed man. During her first week in captivity, Dugard remained in handcuffs, her only human contact being Garrido, who sometimes brought her fast food and talked to her. He provided a bucket for her to use to relieve herself. A week after the kidnapping, Garrido raped the still-handcuffed Dugard for the first time. He continued to rape her frequently, doing so at least once a week for the first three years of her captivity.

At one point, Garrido provided Dugard with a television, but she could not watch the news, and remained unaware of the search for her. Almost a month and a half after her kidnapping, by Dugard's recollection, Garrido moved her to a larger room next door, where she was handcuffed to a bed. He explained that the "demon angels" let him take her and that she would help him with his sexual problems because society had ignored him. Garrido would occasionally go on days-long methamphetamine binges he called "runs", during which he would force Dugard to keep him company by performing sexual favors and engaging in various other activities with him. Garrido made her listen out for the voices he said he could hear from the walls, and often professed a belief that he was a chosen servant of God. These binges would end with Garrido sobbing and apologizing to Dugard, alternating with threats to sell her to people who would put her in a cage.

Seven months into her captivity, Garrido introduced Dugard to his wife, Nancy, who brought the child a stuffed animal and chocolate milk and engaged in the same tearful apologies to her. Though Dugard craved the woman's approval at the time, in a 2011 ABC News interview she stated that Nancy was just as manipulative as Garrido. Dugard related that Nancy alternated between motherly concern and coldness and cruelty, expressing her jealousy of Dugard, whom she regarded as the one to blame for her predicament. She characterized Nancy, who worked as a nursing home aide, as "evil" and "twisted". When Garrido was returned to prison for failing a drug test, Nancy replaced her husband as Dugard's jailer.

The Garridos' neighbor, Patrick McQuaid, told the San Jose Mercury News that as a child he recalled meeting Dugard through a fence in the Garridos' yard soon after the kidnapping. He said that she had identified herself by the name "Jaycee" and that when asked if she lived there or was just visiting, she answered that she lived there. At that point, Garrido came out and took her back indoors. He eventually built an 8-foot-tall (2.4-meter) fence around the backyard and set up a tent for Dugard, the first time that she was allowed to walk outside since her kidnapping.

The Garridos manipulated Dugard further by presenting her, on two occasions, with kittens that would later "mysteriously vanish". When Garrido discovered that she was signing her real name in a journal that she kept about the kittens, she was forced to tear out the page with her name on it, the last time she would be permitted to say or write her name until her captivity ended eighteen years later. She was never allowed to see a doctor or dentist.

=== Pregnancy and children ===
Almost three years into her captivity, the Garridos began to allow Dugard freedom from her handcuffs for periods, though they kept her locked in the bolted room. On Easter Sunday of 1994, they gave her cooked food for the first time. The couple informed Dugard that they believed that she was pregnant. Dugard, aged 13 at the time, had learned of the link between sex and pregnancy from television. Dugard watched television programs on childbirth in preparation for the birth of her first daughter, which occurred when Dugard was aged 14, on August 18, 1994. After the birth of her first daughter, Garrido raped Dugard less frequently, though he would do so when he had taken drugs.

The last time Garrido raped Dugard was the day her second daughter was conceived. Her second daughter was born when Dugard was 17, on November 13, 1997. Dugard took care of her daughters using information learned from television and worked to protect them from Garrido, who continued his enraged rants and lectures.

Dugard coped with her continued captivity by planting flowers in a garden and homeschooling her daughters. At one point, Garrido informed Dugard that to pacify his wife, Dugard and her daughters were to address Nancy as their mother and that she was to teach her daughters that Dugard was their older sister. When Dugard and her daughters were eventually allowed to come into contact with other people, this fiction was continued.

Garrido operated a print shop where Dugard acted as the graphic artist. Ben Daughdrill, a customer of Garrido's printing business, claimed that he met and spoke by telephone with Dugard and that she did excellent work. During this time, Dugard had access to the business phone and an email account. Another customer indicated that she never hinted to him about her childhood abduction or her true identity. Witnesses stated Dugard was seen in the Garrido household, and sometimes answered the front door to talk to people, but never stated there was a problem or attempted to leave. While the family kept to themselves, the girls were sometimes seen playing in the secondary backyard behind the house, where Dugard's living quarters are thought to have been located.

The private area of the backyard included sheds, one of which was used as a recording studio in which Garrido recorded himself singing religious-themed and romantic country songs, two homemade tents, and what has been described as a camping-style shower and toilet. The area was surrounded by tall trees and a 6-foot (1.8-meter)-high fence. An entrance to the secondary backyard was covered by trees and a tarpaulin. Privacy was enhanced by tents and outbuildings. Electricity was supplied by extension cords. The enclosure also housed a car that matched the description of the one used in the abduction.

=== Missed rescue opportunities ===
Law enforcement officers visited the residence at least twice but did not ask to inspect the backyard and did not detect the presence of Dugard or her children in the areas of the property that they did inspect. These were among several missed opportunities for rescue which later led to criticism of authorities:

- Police failed to realize that Dugard had been kidnapped south of South Lake Tahoe, the same location as Phillip Garrido's 1976 kidnapping and rape of Katherine Callaway Hall.
- On April 22, 1992, less than a year after her kidnapping, a man called the Contra Costa County Sheriff's Department from a gas station less than two miles from the Garridos' home, reporting that he saw Dugard inside the gas station staring intently at a missing child poster of herself. The caller then reported seeing her leave in a large yellow van, possibly a Dodge; an old yellow Dodge van was later recovered from the Garrido property that matched the description of the van given in the call. The license plate was not reported in the 1992 call. The caller, the girl, and the van were gone by the time police arrived. The caller never identified himself and the police did not pursue the matter. Contradicting this story, Dugard reported that she never left the Garrido property from the day she was kidnapped until shortly before her first child was born in August 1994.
- In June 2002, the Antioch fire department responded to a report of a juvenile with a shoulder injury that occurred in a swimming pool at the Garridos' home. This information was not relayed to the parole office, which had no record of either a juvenile or a swimming pool at the Garridos' address.
- In 2006, one of Garrido's neighbors called 9-1-1 to inform them that there were tents in the backyard with children living there and that Garrido was "psychotic" with sexual addictions. A deputy sheriff spoke with Garrido at the front of the house for about 30 minutes and left, after telling Garrido that there would be a code violation if people were living outside on the property. After Dugard was found in August 2009, the local Contra Costa County Sheriff, Warren E. Rupf, issued an apology to the victims in a news conference.
- On November 4, 2009, the California Office of the Inspector General issued a report that enumerated lapses by the California Department of Corrections and Rehabilitation that had contributed to Dugard's continued captivity. The central finding was that Garrido was incorrectly classified as needing only low-level supervision; all other lapses derived from that mistake. In his report, the inspector general detailed an instance in which a parole agent encountered a twelve-year-old girl at the home but accepted Garrido's explanation that "she was his brother's daughter and [the agent] did nothing to verify it," even though a call to Garrido's brother verified that he did not have children.

== Reappearance ==
On August 24, 2009, Garrido visited the San Francisco office of the Federal Bureau of Investigation (FBI) and left a four-page essay containing his ideas about religion and sexuality, suggesting that he had discovered a solution to problem behaviors like his past crimes. The essay described how he had cured his deviant behavior and how that information could be used to assist in curing other sexual predators by "controlling human impulses that drive humans to commit dysfunctional acts".

On the same day, Garrido traveled to the University of California, Berkeley (UC Berkeley), with Dugard's two daughters and visited its campus police office, seeking permission to hold a special event as a part of his "God's Desire" program. He spoke with special-events manager Lisa Campbell who perceived his behavior as "erratic" and felt that the girls were "sullen and submissive." She asked Garrido to make an appointment for the next day, which he did, leaving his name in the process. Officer Ally Jacobs ran a background check and discovered that Garrido was a registered sex offender on federal parole for kidnapping and rape. Garrido and the girls returned for their appointment at 2 p.m. the following day, and Jacobs attended the meeting. The girls appeared to Jacobs to be pale as if they had not been exposed to sunlight, and she felt that their behavior was unusual. Garrido's several parole violations were a basis for an arrest, so Jacobs phoned the parole office to relay her concerns, leaving a report on voicemail.

After hearing Jacobs' recorded message, two parole agents drove to the Garridos' house later that day. Upon arrival, they handcuffed Garrido and searched the house, finding only his wife Nancy and his elderly mother at home. The parole agents then drove him to the parole office. En route, Garrido said that the girls who had accompanied him to UC Berkeley "were the daughters of a relative" and that he had had permission from their parents to take them there. Although the parole office had previously barred Garrido from associating with minors, and Berkeley was 40 miles (64 kilometers) from the Garridos' Contra Costa residence (15 miles or 24 kilometers over the 25-mile (40 km) limit he was allowed to travel from his home without his parole agent's permission), nothing was done about these violations. After reviewing his file with a supervisor, they drove Garrido home and ordered him to report to the office again the next day to discuss his visit to UC Berkeley and to follow up on the office's concerns about the two girls.

Garrido arrived at the parole office in Concord, California, on August 26 with Nancy, the two girls, and Dugard, who was introduced as "Allissa". The parole officer decided to separate Garrido from the women and girls to obtain their identification.

Maintaining her false identity as "Allissa", Dugard told investigators that the girls were her daughters. Although she indicated that she was aware that Garrido was a convicted sex offender, she stated that he was a "changed man", a "great person", and was "good with her kids", comments that were echoed by the two girls. When pressed for details that would confirm her identity, Dugard became "extremely defensive" and "agitated", demanding to know why she was being "interrogated", and subsequently stated that she was a battered wife from Minnesota in hiding from her abusive husband. The parole officer eventually called the Concord police. Upon the arrival of a Concord police sergeant, Garrido admitted he had kidnapped and raped Dugard. Only after this did she properly identify herself as Jaycee Dugard. Dugard later said she resisted initial questioning out of fear that her children would be taken from her. It was later suggested that Dugard showed signs of Stockholm syndrome.

In a 2016 ABC News interview, Dugard stated that her compassion and willingness to interact with her captor were her only means of surviving, saying, "The phrase Stockholm Syndrome implies that hostages cracked by terror and abuse become affectionate towards their captors ... Well, it's, really, it's degrading, you know, having my family believe that I was in love with this captor and wanted to stay with him. I mean, that is so far from the truth that it makes me want to throw up ... I adapted to survive my circumstance." She repeatedly stated that, as a survival mechanism, many victims are forced to sympathize with their captors.

Garrido and his wife were placed under arrest. An FBI special agent put Dugard on the telephone with her mother, Terry Probyn. Dugard retained custody of her children and reunited with her mother on August 27, 2009.

== Aftermath ==
=== Reunion and afterward ===
Dugard's aunt, Tina Dugard, and a former business associate of the Garridos, Cheyvonne Molino, have commented that Dugard's children looked healthy. Tina said that upon meeting them after their escape, they "always appeared and behaved like normal kids". Molino said of the times that she met them while they were captive "that in her presence the girls never acted robotically" and did not wear unusual clothing.

In the days following Dugard's return, her stepfather confirmed that Dugard and her daughters were in good health and intelligent, their reunion was going well, and they were proceeding slowly. He said Dugard had developed a significant emotional bond with Garrido, and the two daughters cried when they learned of their father's arrest. Tina Dugard reported that the daughters were clever, articulate, and curious girls.

Ernie Allen, president of the National Center for Missing and Exploited Children, said Dugard's reappearance is an important event for families of other long-term missing children because it shows that hope remains even in long-term cases. Abduction survivor Elizabeth Smart has stressed the importance of focusing on the future with a positive attitude as an effective approach to accepting what has happened. Shawn Hornbeck, another abduction survivor, also commented on the case, noting: "Coming out of what she's had to endure is like entering a new world. It's like a door has opened for her and she's emerged from a world that's black and white into one that's full of color." He opined that the reason Dugard never escaped of her own accord was that she was brainwashed. He further offered insight into post-abduction life, saying that feelings of anger are normal for survivors and that therapy can enable them to move on with their lives.

Three weeks after her release, Dugard asked for the pets that were raised in the home. On October 14, 2009, People magazine published the first verified photo of Jaycee Dugard as an adult on its cover. Dugard's memoir, A Stolen Life: A Memoir, was published on July 12, 2011, by Simon & Schuster, to positive reviews.

Dugard began animal-assisted therapy with horses, an activity she shared with her mother Terry and her sister Shayna.

=== Police investigations ===
Following the arrest, police searched the Garrido house extensively for evidence of other crimes. Because Garrido had access to his neighbor's house, it was also searched for evidence. Police also searched the homes and business of one of Garrido's printing business clients. Police agencies from Hayward and Dublin, California, conducted searches of the Garridos' property for evidence pertaining to missing girls from those communities but did not find any. In July 2011, Hayward police announced that Garrido had not been eliminated as a suspect and was still a person of interest in the abduction case of Michaela Garecht. Garecht was kidnapped in 1988 and Hayward is 55 miles (89 kilometers) from the Garridos' Antioch home. In December 2020, serial killer David Misch was charged with the kidnapping and murder of Garecht.

=== Garrido's statements ===
On August 27, 2009, KCRA-TV in Sacramento, California, interviewed Garrido in his jail cell by telephone. During the interview, Garrido said, "In the end, this is going to be a powerful, heartwarming story" because in his version of events:

My life has been straightened out. ... Wait till you hear the story of what took place at this house. You're going to be absolutely impressed. It's a disgusting thing that took place with me at the beginning, but I turned my life completely around.

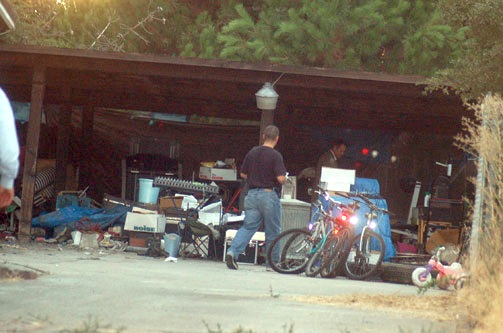
Investigators at the Garridos' Contra Costa home

Garrido repeatedly told the reporter how he "filed documents" with the FBI on August 24, 2009, which, when they were published, would cause people to "fall over backwards", and that he could not reveal more because he "had to protect law enforcement", and "what happened" ... was "something that humans have not understood well". In the interview, Garrido denied he had ever harmed Dugard's two daughters. He said their births changed his life, saying, "they slept in my arms every single night since birth. I never touched them." On August 28, 2009, FBI spokesman Joseph Schadler confirmed that Garrido had indeed left the documents with the agency, as he had claimed, but declined to discuss further details. The document, titled Origin of Schizophrenia Revealed, was eventually released by the FBI. It is about stopping schizophrenics from turning violent and controlling sounds with the human mind.

=== Legal proceedings ===
On August 28, 2009, Phillip and Nancy Garrido pleaded guilty to charges including kidnapping, rape, and false imprisonment. The case was prosecuted in El Dorado County, by elected District Attorney Vern R. Pierson and Assistant District Attorney James A. Clinchard. A bail review/pre-preliminary hearing was held September 14, 2009, at the El Dorado County Superior Court in Placerville, California. At the hearing, Superior Court Judge Douglas Phimister set bail for Nancy at US$30 million. There was a no-bail parole hold on Phillip. The judge initially kept Nancy in custody on a no-bail hold, but she was granted bail at a later date. At the September 14 hearing, Phimister also granted a request from Phillip Garrido's attorney to have a psychologist or psychiatrist appointed to conduct a confidential evaluation. Such examinations can be used by the defense to assist in case preparation, and additional mental health examinations can be ordered at subsequent phases in the proceedings. On October 29, 2009, a short hearing was held to set a date for the next pre-preliminary hearing when issues such as discovery were to be discussed. This hearing occurred on December 11, 2009. Katie Callaway Hall, whom Phillip Garrido kidnapped and raped in 1976, appeared in the courtroom at the October and December hearings. She did not speak during either proceeding.

On November 5, 2009, Phimister ordered Nancy Garrido's defense attorney, Gilbert Maines, to be removed from the case. According to a posting on the court's website, the decision occurred in a review of "confidential evidence" that has not been disclosed to the public, and details of the proceedings were kept sealed. The decision was stayed until November 30, 2009. On November 12, 2009, Phimister appointed Stephen A. Tapson as interim counsel for Nancy. Gilbert Maines appealed the decision and received a favorable ruling by the California Third District Court of Appeal on December 15, 2009. On December 22, 2009, the same court gave the El Dorado Superior Court until January 2010 to respond to the ruling. Both Gilbert Maines and Stephen Tapson appeared at the discovery hearing on December 11, 2009. A hearing was held on January 21, 2010. At that hearing, Maines was removed from the case and Tapson was appointed defense counsel for Nancy Garrido. In addition, bail, in the amount of US$20 million, was set for Nancy.

At a press conference on February 28, 2011, Tapson said that Nancy and Phillip Garrido had both made a "full confession" in the case. The development came as lawyers for both sides reopened discussions on a possible plea deal that had the potential to obviate the need for a trial. Nancy's attorney acknowledged that she was facing "241 years, eight months to life" and that he was working for a reduced sentence in the 30-year range. He stated that the prosecutor had acknowledged that Phillip was a master manipulator and that Nancy was under both his influence and that of substances during the period of Dugard's kidnapping, so should receive some consideration while alluding to parallels with kidnap victim Patty Hearst and Stockholm syndrome.

On April 7, 2011, instead of pleading guilty, as had been expected based on the previous statements, the Garridos pleaded not guilty to charges of kidnapping and raping Dugard, as well as other charges, in an amended grand jury indictment. Phillip's attorney, public defender Susan Gellman, alleged that the grand jury might have been selected improperly and might have acted improperly. Gellman did not elaborate on her claim in the courtroom but said outside that she had questions about the racial and geographic makeup of the grand jury that originally indicted the Garridos in September 2010. Judge Phimister noted that there were issues about the process itself before the grand jury, and also stated that the court would consider whether the grand jury acted appropriately. These developments were largely unforeseen by attorney Stephen Tapson, who represented Nancy; Tapson had said earlier that week that Phillip had made a deal with prosecutors to plead guilty and spend the rest of his life in prison. Gellman was upset with Tapson for telling reporters that her client had planned to plead guilty, saying that he should only speak about his own client, Nancy. Tapson said he found out about Gellman's plans only late on April 6. Neither attorney would elaborate further on the specific concerns about the grand jury. El Dorado District Attorney Vern Pierson said he did not think the complaints about the grand jury would ultimately derail the case against the Garridos.

On April 28, 2011, the Garridos pled guilty to kidnapping and rape by force. On June 2, 2011, Phillip was sentenced to 431 years to life imprisonment. Nancy was sentenced to 36 years to life imprisonment. The sentences would allow Nancy to be eligible for parole in August 2029.

Phillip was imprisoned in California State Prison, Corcoran, while Nancy was incarcerated at Central California Women's Facility in Chowchilla. Dugard did not attend the sentencing, instead sending a written message with her mother to read aloud in court.

=== Settlement with the State of California ===
As Garrido had been on parole for a 1976 rape at the time of her kidnapping, Dugard sued the state of California, which had taken over his parole supervision from the federal government in 1999, on account of the numerous lapses by law enforcement during instances in which her captivity should have been discovered by them. In July 2010, the State of California approved a settlement of US$20 million (equivalent to $28.8 million in 2025) with Dugard to compensate her for: "various lapses by the Corrections Department [that contributed to] Dugard's continued captivity, ongoing sexual assault, and mental and/or physical abuse". The settlement, part of AB1714, was approved by the California State Assembly by a 70 to 2 vote, and by the California State Senate by a 30 to 1 vote. San Francisco County Superior Court Judge Daniel Weinstein, who mediated the settlement, stated that the settlement was reached to avoid a lawsuit, which would be a: "greater invasion of privacy and greater publicity for the state". The bill was signed by California Governor Arnold Schwarzenegger on July 9.

=== Lawsuit against the United States ===
On September 22, 2011, Dugard filed a lawsuit in United States District Court for the Northern District of California, accusing the United States of failing to monitor Garrido when he was a federal parolee. Dugard stated in her lawsuit against the federal government that parole officials should have revoked Garrido's parole and returned him to prison for any number of parole violations that preceded her abduction, including testing positive for drugs and alcohol.

On March 15, 2016, the U.S. Court of Appeals for the Ninth Circuit dismissed Dugard's civil claims under the Federal Tort Claims Act (FTCA). In a 2–1 decision authored by Judge John B. Owens, the court ruled that the federal government's sovereign immunity was not waived because the U.S. is only liable "in the same manner and to the same extent as a private individual under like circumstances" under state law. In this case, because the U.S. would not be liable under California law, Dugard could not prevail on her FTCA claim. The majority's rationale was that Dugard had not been victimized by Garrido at the time he was placed under federal parole supervision, and "there was no way to anticipate she would become his victim," and thus, federal authorities in California had no duty to protect her or other members of the general public from him. Chief District Court Judge William Smith again dissented, stating that he believed that the majority misinterpreted California law, as the cases cited by the majority only involved FTCA liability in rehabilitation centers, and there were good legitimate grounds to hold the government liable.

=== Parole officer breaks his silence ===
In November 2022, Phillip Garrido's former parole officer, Edward Santos Jr., who had retired in December 2021, broke his silence by speaking to Sacramento's KCRA-TV. Santos stated that he was not permitted to relate his version of the events that led to the arrest of the Garridos and Dugard's rescue, saying, "I wish the state of California would've allowed me to speak. I was told not to speak to anybody at all ... Just keep quiet. Don't say anything and hopefully you'll keep your job. That's the way I always felt." Santos stated he had thoroughly searched the Garridos' house and backyard, and found no trace of Dugard. He also said that his actions on the day of Garrido's arrest were key to Dugard's rescue, as he visited the Garrido home after hearing about the two young girls who were seen with Garrido on the UC Berkeley campus, and demanded to know their whereabouts. When Garrido said that they had been picked up by their father, Santos ordered Garrido to appear at Santos's office with them the following morning with their parents, and when they showed up with Nancy that morning and gave conflicting stories about the girls' identities, Santos persistently questioned them and Dugard. Santos said that if he had not done this, Dugard's identity would not have been discovered. Santos insisted that he did his job, but regretted not having found Dugard when he first visited the Garrido home and also publicly apologized to Dugard for not having spoken to her after his initial interview of her, during which he had treated her as if she were a suspect rather than a victim. The California Department of Corrections confirmed to KCRA-TV that Santos had been a parole officer with that agency, but would not confirm that he had been Garrido's parole officer, "due to safety and security issues and the multiple investigations and reviews after the arrest of the Garridos."

== In media ==
- Jaycee Dugard documented her life in captivity in a book, A Stolen Life: A Memoir, which was released in July 2011. Dugard wrote it as part of her therapy with Rebecca Bailey, who specializes in post-trauma family reunification. Dugard says she wrote the book to assist other survivors of sexual abuse. A few days before the book was released, Dugard gave her first extensive television interview taped in Ojai, California, to ABC's Diane Sawyer.
- An episode of Wicked Attraction, an American crime show on the Investigation Discovery network, centered upon Phillip and Nancy Garrido, and detailed Dugard's kidnapping and recovery.
- A documentary that aired in October 2009 on Channel 4 in Britain titled Captive for 18 Years: Jaycee Lee focused on the story of Dugard's kidnapping, recovery, and the beginnings of the trial including interviews with Jaycee's stepfather.
- Dugard was awarded a Lifetime Leadership honor at the third annual The DVF Awards on March 9, 2012, for her courage and her JAYC Foundation, which provides support to families dealing with abduction and other losses.
- Dugard's second book, Freedom: My Book of Firsts, was released on July 12, 2016, by Simon & Schuster. The book focuses on her life since the publication of A Stolen Life and her recovery and reintegration into the world. She was again interviewed by Diane Sawyer a few days before publication.
- The case was covered by Casefile True Crime Podcast on September 17, 2016.

== See also ==
- List of long-term false imprisonment cases
- List of solved missing person cases
