= Coleman University =

Private university in San Diego, California

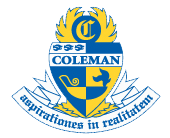
- Former names: Automation Institute of San Diego (1963–1969), Coleman College (1969–2018)
- Motto: Aspirationes in realitatem
- Motto in English: "Dreams Into Reality"
- Type: Private university
- Active: 1963–2018
- President: Norbert J. Kubilus
- Location: San Diego, California, United States; 32°49′18″N 117°08′09″W
- Website: www.coleman.edu

Coleman University (1963–2018) was a private university in San Diego, California, United States, focused on Information Technology education. Coleman had a technology-based curriculum with undergraduate, graduate, and distance education academic programs and was accredited by the Accrediting Council for Independent Colleges and Schools. The university closed on August 5, 2018.

== History ==
Coleman University (originally Automation Institute of San Diego) was founded on November 13, 1963 by Dr. Coleman Furr. Coleman established a general education department offering courses emphasizing English and communication, mathematics, social sciences, humanities, and management.

- 1967 – The College became authorized to award degrees by the State of California.
- 1969 – Renamed Coleman College.
- 1972 – The College became a non-profit educational institute.
- 1979 – Coleman created the Department of Computer Technology. This program lead to a certificate in Computer Electronics Technology and served as the core of the associate and bachelor's degree programs.
- 1982 – a Master of Science degree in Information Systems was developed.
- 1986 – the San Marcos campus was opened to serve growing populations in the northern part of San Diego County.
- 1994 – Coleman developed an interdisciplinary program in computer applications and networks in the Office Automation Systems Department.
- 1996 – the Computer Applications and Networks Department replaced Office Automation Systems. The Computer Applications and Networks curriculum provided training in local area networks and client-server applications.
- 1996 – the Computer Electronics Technology program was redesigned renamed Computer Engineering Technology. Subsequently, the program evolved and was renamed Computer Network Technology. This program eventually merged with the Computer Applications and Network program and became known as the Computer Networks program.
- 2002 – Coleman launched a Computer Graphic Design program.
- 2003 – Coleman introduced a Master of Science degree program in Business and Technology Management.
- 2008 – During the Coleman College celebration of its 45th anniversary, the transition to Coleman University was announced.
- 2009 – Coleman introduced a Master of Business Administration program.
- 2012 – Coleman introduced a Master of Business Administration In Health Care Management program.
- 2012 – Coleman announces it will teach out and then close the San Marcos branch campus by December 2013.
- 2015 - Coleman relaunches its Graphic Design Program.
- 2017 - Coleman ends its Graphic Design Program.
- 2018 - Coleman discontinues its education. Coleman closed its doors on August 6, 2018.

== Accreditation ==
Coleman University was accredited by the Accrediting Council of Independent Colleges and Schools and authorized by the State of California under EC Section 94750 to award accredited degrees. Coleman was also approved for veteran training.
