= David Misch =

American serial killer and rapist (born 1961)

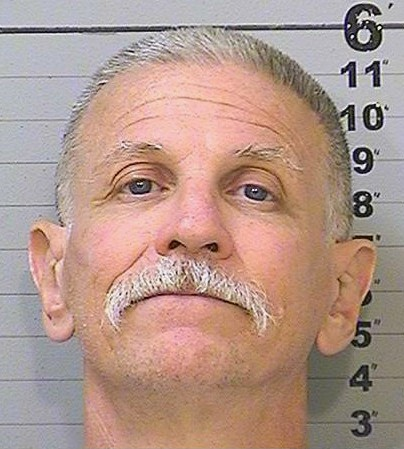
- Misch in 2017
- Born: David Emery Misch; February 19, 1961 (age 65); Chicago, Illinois, U.S.
- Other name: "Dave"
- Convictions: Ball: Murder; Xavier and Duey: First-degree murder (2 counts); Garecht: Awaiting trial
- Penalty: Ball: Life imprisonment with possibility of parole Xavier and Duey: Life imprisonment with possibility of parole after 50 years Garecht: Awaiting trial

Details
- Victims: 3–4+
- Span of crimes: 1986–1989
- Country: United States
- State: California
- Date apprehended: December 8, 1989
- Imprisoned at: California Health Care Facility, Stockton, California

David Emery Misch (born February 19, 1961) is an American serial killer and rapist who was convicted of killing three women in northern California from 1986 to 1989. He is also, as of June 2026, awaiting trial for the murder of Michaela Garecht, a 9-year-old girl whose 1988 disappearance achieved notoriety in the San Francisco Bay Area and sparked a decades-long search before Misch was linked to the crime in 2020.

== Early life ==
David Emery Misch was born on February 19, 1961, in Chicago, Illinois, but in the mid-1960s, his family moved to Santa Clara, California, where he spent his youth and teenage years. Misch's father, Robert, was an alcoholic who was aggressive towards his wife and son. As a result of the constant physical assaults, David lost all interest in the educational process some time in the mid-1970s. In later interviews, he said that he blamed his mother for not stopping the abuse.

As he often clashed with his parents, Misch spent most of his time on the streets and began engaging in criminal activities at the age of 16.

== Criminal history ==
=== Violent crimes ===
In 1977, the 16-year-old Misch entered a neighbor's house and raped a housecleaner at knifepoint. After the sexual assault, he attempted to strangle her, but she kicked him in the stomach and convinced him to spare her. Misch was arrested shortly afterwards, but as he was a juvenile, he was given a minor prison sentence and released on parole in 1979.

A few days after his release, Misch, clad only in a jacket, broke into another neighbor's house and threatened to kill a woman and her two children with a knife, but he did not harm either of them and left the house. Nevertheless, he was arrested and ordered to undergo a forensic psychiatric examination, which concluded that he was insane, after which he was transferred to the Atascadero State Hospital for treatment, where he was treated for the next several months. In September 1981, Misch's mental condition improved, and he was deemed not to be a danger to society, whereupon he was released and moved to Hayward. There, he found work as a sign painter for a local construction company.

In June 1982, Misch was putting up real estate signs on utility poles on Broadway Terrace in Oakland Hills when he noticed 18-year-old Swiss student Betina Benthaus, who had come to the United States on a student exchange program. He grabbed her from behind and threatened to kill her, cutting her lip during a scuffle and then punching her into unconsciousness. Misch attempted to drag her to a nearby driveway but was spotted by rattled residents who confronted him. In an attempt to escape, he lied that she had simply fallen, and while the others were not looking, he got into his pickup truck and fled. However, the residents memorized the name of the car dealership engraved on the truck and immediately notified police, who quickly traced it back to Misch, who was soon arrested and charged with assault and attempted rape. For this crime, he would later be convicted and sentenced to four years imprisonment.

After partially serving his sentence, Misch was released in January 1984 and returned to Hayward, where he moved in with a girlfriend and earned money from manual labor and occasional thefts. In November 1987, his girlfriend gave birth to a son named David Michael Misch, who died at the age of 3 months in February 1988. Shortly after his son's death, Misch was arrested on a theft charge and imprisoned for several months in the Alameda County Jail.

Misch was paroled yet again on November 14, 1988, and immediately returned to Hayward. Just eight days later, he was apprehended by police officers after a routine check of his vehicle led to the discovery of wire cutters, an axe, a large penknife, and a flashlight. He was eventually charged with theft and convicted once again in April 1989, for which he had to serve 17 months at the San Quentin State Prison.

=== Murder of Margaret Ball ===
After serving seven months in prison, Misch was granted parole and released on November 17, 1989. On December 8, he was arrested for the murder of 36-year-old Margaret Narcisa Ball, who was found beaten and stabbed to death in her home on Lowell Avenue, unincorporated Hayward, the day prior. Her body was found in the living room by the 11-year-old daughter of her boyfriend, Michael Zaboy, bearing stab wounds to the chest and abdomen. A search of the apartment also revealed some food stamps and pocket change had been stolen, which amounted to $85 in total.

The investigators immediately focused their efforts on locating Ball's car, a 1981 silver-colored Mazda, which they eventually found near the Farm House Motel on MacArthur Boulevard in Oakland, driven by David Misch. Shortly after detaining him, officers learned from Zaboy and Ball's family members that Misch, whom they knew simply as "Dave," was an acquaintance who had repeatedly sexually harassed and threatened her with physical violence. While Misch himself denied responsibility, his father would later testify that on the day of the murder, David came home and confessed to killing Ball in a methamphetamine-induced robbery. He would eventually confess, but claimed that they were engaged in consensual sex when Ball suddenly told him that she did not want to continue; upon hearing so, Misch said that he slapped her, prompting the woman to pull a knife on him.

Misch would eventually be convicted of this murder in 1990 and was sentenced to life imprisonment with the possibility of parole. In subsequent years, Misch was moved around various penitentiaries in the California penal system and had three of his parole applications denied.

== Link to previous crimes ==
=== Michelle Xavier and Jennifer Duey ===
In 2003, a blood sample was taken from Misch for DNA testing, which revealed that his genotypic profile matched that of a man whose epithelial particles were found under the fingernails of 20-year-old Jennifer Duey. Duey, along with her 18-year-old friend Michelle Xavier, had recently graduated from Notre Dame High School in San Jose and planned to attend a friend's birthday party in Fremont. The pair were last seen alive at a 7-Eleven on February 1, 1986, and on the following day, a passing motorcyclist found their bodies off Mill Creek Road. Duey had been stabbed several times and Xavier had been shot, with the killer later having stolen Xavier's 1984 Pontiac Sunbird convertible, which was found abandoned in the parking lot of a shopping center located about three miles away from where the girls' bodies were found.

Soon after this, Misch was interviewed in prison but claimed that he had nothing to do with the murders. Instead, he claimed that on the day of the murders, he was filling his car at a gas station when he apparently saw one of the two girls being dragged away by two men, whereupon he supposedly came to their aid and fought with the kidnappers, who managed to escape. Misch claimed that the skin particles found under the fingernails were because one of the girls likely scratched him in the fight and that he was a "protector of all the girls" and prostitutes who worked in the area. Despite proclaiming to be a Good Samaritan, Misch also admitted to liking "big knives" and that he had attacked Benthaus because she was "walking with an arrogant attitude."

Shortly after the end of the interview, detectives realized that their recorder had turned off halfway through, and attempted to schedule another meeting with Misch weeks later, however, he completely recanted his story and refused to admit to anything, leading to him not being charged in this case for more than 14 years. On September 8, 2017, Misch was interviewed yet again, and on September 21, he attempted to hang himself in his jail cell, leaving behind a suicide note addressed to his brother, in which he claimed that he wanted to protect him and their mom from further questioning and embarrassment. However, he survived the suicide attempt, and in the following year he was charged with the double murder and ordered to be transferred to the Alameda County Jail from the Folsom State Prison.

=== Michaela Garecht ===
In late December 2020, Misch was charged with the kidnapping and murder of 9-year-old Michaela Garecht, who was abducted on November 19, 1988, from the Rainbow Market in Hayward. Her best friend, who was with her at the time, testified that the two girls had just come out of the store when they noticed that Garecht's scooter was missing. They proceeded to search for it and eventually found it in the far corner of the store's parking lot. Garecht then attempted to retrieve it but was then abducted by a white male with long hair in his early 30s who drove up to her in a gold or brown Oldsmobile with no hubcaps and pulled her inside.

Her abduction caused a public outcry and was repeatedly investigated over the following decades. Several people were considered suspects at different times, among them child killer Curtis Dean Anderson and serial killer duo Loren Herzog and Wesley Shermantine, collectively known as the Speed Freak Killers. According to the Alameda County District Attorney's Office, on the day of Garecht's abduction, Misch was at the nearby Chapel of the Chimes Cemetery, visiting the gravestone of his young son on what would have been his first birthday. The cemetery was located across the street from the market, giving him ample opportunity to abduct the girl.

The main evidence against Misch was a partial palm print and thumbprint on Garecht's scooter, which, according to investigators, they were able to obtain thanks to the advancements of technology. On the other hand, Misch's lawyers said that they would insist on their client's innocence at trial, arguing that since Garecht's body has never been found, a murder cannot be proved beyond a reasonable doubt.

== 2024 trial ==
Misch's trial for the murders of Xavier and Duey began on October 21, 2024, and lasted for two months. The Alameda County Prosecutor's Office insisted on consolidating the two murder cases into one trial because all three murder charges against the defendant were similar in motive and execution, but Misch's lawyers objected, arguing that it was mostly circumstantial evidence or speculation. Misch had pleaded not guilty and waived his right to a speedy trial. His trial began in October 2024. He was found guilty on two counts of first-degree murder on December 19, 2024. Misch was subsequently sentenced to two consecutive terms of 25 years-to-life on January 21, 2025, making him eligible for parole in 50 years after he completes his sentence for the murder of Ball.

== See also ==
- List of serial killers in the United States
