= Frederick Price =

Frederick, Frederic or Fred Price may refer to:

- Freddy Price (1888–1960), English footballer
- Frederick George Hilton Price (1842–1909), English banker and antiquarian
- Frederick K. C. Price (1932–2021), founder and pastor of Crenshaw Christian Center, California
- Frederic Price (cricketer, born 1840) (1840–1894), English cricketer
- Frederic Price (cricketer, born 1852) (1852–1937), English clergyman and cricketer
- Fred Price (cricketer) (1902–1969), English cricketer
- Sir Frederick Price (civil servant) (1839–?), Indian civil servant
- Fred Price (footballer) (1901–1985), English footballer
- Fred R. Price (1927–2015), American art director and set decorator
- R. Fred Price, California politician
- Frederick William Price (1873–1957), British cardiologist and medical author
- Fred Price (1915–1987), American old-time musician

== See also ==
- Freddie Price (born 2002), English footballer
