= Cecil Green =

Cecil Green may refer to:

- Cecil Howard Green (1900–2003), British-born American geophysicist, electrical engineer, and educational philanthropist
- Cecil Green (racing driver) (1919–1951), American racing driver
- Cecil Green (politician) (1924–1994), American politician, member of the California State Senate
