= Senator Ackerman =

Senator Ackerman may refer to:

- Dick Ackerman (born 1942), California State State Senate
- Ernest R. Ackerman (1863–1931), New Jersey State Senate
- Gary Ackerman (born 1942), New York State Senate
