= California's 72nd State Assembly district =

American legislative district

Current assemblymember
Diane Dixon; R–Newport Beach
- Population (2010) • Voting age • Citizen voting age: 469,933; 361,195; 296,747
- Demographics: 38.67% White; 1.15% Black; 25.67% Latino; 32.81% Asian; 0.50% Native American; 0.53% Hawaiian/Pacific Islander; 0.20% other; 0.46% remainder of multiracial
- Registered voters: 256,514
- Registration: 35.89% Republican; 34.83% Democratic; 24.48% No party preference

California's 72nd State Assembly district is one of 80 California State Assembly districts. It is currently represented by Republican Diane Dixon.

== District profile ==
The district encompasses mostly of coastal communities in Orange County. The district is primarily suburban.

Orange County

- Aliso Viejo
- Lake Forest
- Huntington Beach (partially)
- Laguna Beach
- Laguna Hills
- Laguna Woods
- Seal Beach (partially)

== Election results from statewide races ==
Year	Office	Results
2021	Recall	Yes 52.4 – 47.6%
2020	President	Trump 50.3–47.8%
2018	Governor	Cox 51.6–48.4%
2018	Senator	Feinstein 54.0–46.0%
2016	President	Clinton 51.4–43.1%
2016	Senator	Sanchez 50.4–49.6%
2014	Governor	Kashkari 53.7–46.3%
2012	President	Romney 51.1–46.7%
2012	Senator	Emken 51.3–48.7%

== List of assembly members representing the district ==
Due to redistricting, the 72nd district has been moved around different parts of the state. The current iteration resulted from the 2021 redistricting by the California Citizens Redistricting Commission.

Assembly members	Party	Years served	Counties represented	Notes
R. J. Van Voorhies	Republican	January 5, 1885 – January 3, 1887	Alpine, Mono, Inyo	
Andrew J. Gould	Republican	January 3, 1887 – January 7, 1889	Alpine, Mono, Inyo	
Cyrus Coleman	Republican	January 7, 1889 – January 5, 1891	Alpine, Mono, Inyo	
Frank Eugene Hunewill	Republican	January 5, 1891 – January 2, 1893	Alpine, Mono, Inyo	
T. J. Kerns	Democratic	January 2, 1893 – January 7, 1895	Los Angeles	
Brewster C. Kenyon	Republican	January 7, 1895 – January 2, 1899	Los Angeles	
Joseph M. Miller	Republican	January 2, 1899 – January 1, 1901	Los Angeles	
William H. Savage	Republican	January 1, 1901 – January 5, 1903	Los Angeles	
Herbert Swift Greenwood McCartney	Republican	January 5, 1903 – January 7, 1907	Los Angeles	
Fred E. Pierce	Republican	January 7, 1907 – January 4, 1909	Los Angeles	
John N. O. Rech	Republican	January 4, 1909 – January 2, 1911	Los Angeles	
Henry S. Benedict	Republican	January 2, 1911 – January 6, 1913	Los Angeles	
Arthur G. Kuck	Republican	January 6, 1913 – January 4, 1915	Los Angeles	
Harry A. Chamberlin	Republican	January 4, 1915 – January 8, 1917	Los Angeles	
George C. Watson	Republican	January 8, 1917 – January 6, 1919	Los Angeles	
Alexander P. Fleming	Republican	January 6, 1919 – December 15, 1920	Los Angeles	Died in office before the end of term. Died from complications of heart and kidney maladies. He also served as Los Angeles City Council from July 7, 1919 to his death.
Vacant		December 15, 1920 – January 3, 1921	Los Angeles	
Willard E. Badham	Republican	January 3, 1921 – January 5, 1931	Los Angeles	
Ben A. Hill	Republican	January 5, 1931 – January 2, 1933	Los Angeles	
Hobart R. Alter	Republican	January 2, 1933 – January 7, 1935	San Bernardino	
Godfrey A. Andreas	Democratic	January 7, 1935 – October 13, 1942	San Bernardino	Died in office.
Vacant		October 13, 1942 – January 4, 1943	San Bernardino	
R. Fred Price	Republican	January 4, 1943 – January 8, 1951	San Bernardino	
Stanford C. Shaw	Democratic	January 8, 1951 – January 3, 1955	San Bernardino	
Eugene G. Nisbet	Democratic	January 3, 1955 – January 7, 1963	San Bernardino	
John Quimby	Democratic	January 7, 1963 – November 30, 1974	San Bernardino	
Richard H. Robinson	Democratic	December 2, 1974 – November 30, 1986	Orange	
Dick Longshore	Republican	December 1, 1986 – June 8, 1988	Orange	Died in office from pneumonia.
Vacant		June 8, 1988 – December 5, 1988	Orange	
Curt Pringle	Republican	December 5, 1988 – November 30, 1990	Orange	
Tom Umberg	Democratic	December 3, 1990 – November 30, 1992	Orange	
Ross Johnson	Republican	December 7, 1992 – May 11, 1995	Orange	Resigned from office to be sworn in the 35th State Senate district after winning special election.
Vacant		May 11, 1995 – September 13, 1995	Orange	
Dick Ackerman	Republican	September 13, 1995 – November 30, 2000	Orange	Sworn in after winning special election.
Lynn Daucher	Republican	December 4, 2000 – November 30, 2006	Orange	
Michael D. Duvall	Republican	December 4, 2006 – September 9, 2009	Orange	Resigned from office after he was caught on tape talking about having an affair with a female lobbyist.
Vacant		September 9, 2009 – January 29, 2010	Orange	
Chris Norby	Republican	January 29, 2010 – November 30, 2012	Orange	Sworn in after winning special election.
Travis Allen	Republican	December 3, 2012 – November 30, 2018	Orange	
Tyler Diep	Republican	December 3, 2018 – November 30, 2020	Orange	
Janet Nguyen	Republican	December 7, 2020 – November 30, 2022	Orange	
Diane Dixon	Republican	December 5, 2022 – present	Orange	

== Election results (1990–present) ==
=== 2024 ===
2024 California State Assembly 72nd district election
Primary election
Party	Candidate	Votes	%
Republican	Diane Dixon (incumbent)	87,904	60.9
Democratic	Dom Jones	56,374	39.1
Total votes		144,278	100.0
General election
Republican	Diane Dixon (incumbent)	157,278	59.5
Democratic	Dom Jones	107,251	40.5
Total votes		264,529	100.0
Republican hold			

=== 2022 ===
2022 California State Assembly 72nd district election
Primary election
Party	Candidate	Votes	%
Democratic	Judie Mancuso	59,016	43.3
Republican	Diane Dixon	58,132	42.7
Republican	Benjamin Yu	19,115	14.0
Total votes		136,263	100.0
General election
Republican	Diane Dixon	116,588	56.2
Democratic	Judie Mancuso	90,730	43.8
Total votes		207,318	100.0
Republican hold			

=== 2020 ===
2020 California State Assembly 72nd district election
Primary election
Party	Candidate	Votes	%
Republican	Janet Nguyen	39,778	33.8
Democratic	Diedre Nguyen	30,021	25.5
Republican	Tyler Diep (incumbent)	29,186	24.8
Democratic	Bijan Mohseni	18,668	15.9
Total votes		117,653	100.0
General election
Republican	Janet Nguyen	122,483	54.2
Democratic	Diedre Nguyen	103,707	45.8
Total votes		226,190	100.0
Republican hold			

=== 2018 ===
2018 California State Assembly 72nd district election
Primary election
Party	Candidate	Votes	%
Democratic	Josh Lowenthal	34,462	36.8
Republican	Tyler Diep	27,825	29.7
Republican	Greg Haskin	19,199	20.5
Republican	Long Pham	7,692	8.2
Republican	Richard Laird	4,555	5.0
Total votes		93,733	100.0
General election
Republican	Tyler Diep	83,221	51.6
Democratic	Josh Lowenthal	78,080	48.4
Total votes		161,301	100.0
Republican hold			

=== 2016 ===
2016 California State Assembly 72nd district election
Primary election
Party	Candidate	Votes	%
Republican	Travis Allen (incumbent)	48,321	50.4
Democratic	Lenore Albert-Sheridan	27,466	28.6
Democratic	Nam Pham	20,158	21.0
Total votes		95,945	100.0
General election
Republican	Travis Allen (incumbent)	98,335	58.0
Democratic	Lenore Albert-Sheridan	71,332	42.0
Total votes		169,667	100.0
Republican hold			

=== 2014 ===
2014 California State Assembly 72nd district election
Primary election
Party	Candidate	Votes	%
Republican	Travis Allen (incumbent)	36,677	65.5
Democratic	Joel Block	11,556	20.6
Democratic	Albert Ayala	7,733	13.8
Total votes		55,966	100.0
General election
Republican	Travis Allen (incumbent)	66,150	65.5
Democratic	Joel Block	34,793	34.5
Total votes		100,943	100.0
Republican hold			

=== 2012 ===
2012 California State Assembly 72nd district election
Primary election
Party	Candidate	Votes	%
Republican	Troy Edgar	18,060	28.0
Republican	Travis Allen	12,851	19.9
Democratic	Joe Dovinh	12,432	19.3
Republican	Long Pham	12,409	19.2
Democratic	Albert Ayala	8,816	13.7
Total votes		64,568	100.0
General election
Republican	Travis Allen	79,110	55.7
Republican	Troy Edgar	62,983	44.3
Total votes		142,093	100.0
Republican hold			

=== 2010 ===
2010 California State Assembly 72nd district election
Party	Candidate	Votes	%
Republican	Chris Norby (incumbent)	68,751	61.4
Democratic	Esiquio Ramos Uballe	36,534	32.5
Green	Jane Rands	6,845	6.1
Total votes		112,130	100.0
Republican hold			

=== 2010 (special) ===
2010 California State Assembly 72nd district special election Vacancy resulting from the resignation of Michael Duvall
Party	Candidate	Votes	%
Republican	Chris Norby	21,406	62.7
Democratic	John MacMurray	10,622	31.1
Green	Jane Rands	2,100	6.2
Total votes		34,128	100.0
Republican hold			

=== 2008 ===
2008 California State Assembly 72nd district election
Party	Candidate	Votes	%
Republican	Michael Duvall (incumbent)	79,066	54.8
Democratic	John MacMurray	65,216	45.2
Total votes		144,282	100.0
Republican hold			

=== 2006 ===
2006 California State Assembly 72nd district election
Party	Candidate	Votes	%
Republican	Michael Duvall	55,664	59.1
Democratic	John MacMurray	35,352	37.6
Libertarian	Brian Cross	3,114	3.3
Total votes		94,120	100.0
Republican hold			

=== 2004 ===
2004 California State Assembly 72nd district election
Party	Candidate	Votes	%
Republican	Lynn Daucher (incumbent)	90,255	66.0
Democratic	Ross W. Johnson	41,528	30.4
Libertarian	Brian Lee Cross	5,031	3.7
Total votes		136,814	100.0
Republican hold			

=== 2002 ===
2002 California State Assembly 72nd district election
Party	Candidate	Votes	%
Republican	Lynn Daucher (incumbent)	54,505	68.1
Democratic	G. Nanjundappa	22,236	27.8
Libertarian	Brian Lee Cross	3,300	4.1
Total votes		80,041	100.0
Republican hold			

=== 2000 ===
2000 California State Assembly 72nd district election
Party	Candidate	Votes	%
Republican	Lynn Daucher	94,687	67.7
Democratic	G. Nanjundappa	37,655	26.9
Natural Law	John W. Zamarra	7,606	5.4
Total votes		139,948	100.0
Republican hold			

=== 1998 ===
1998 California State Assembly 72nd district election
Party	Candidate	Votes	%
Republican	Dick Ackerman (incumbent)	71,148	67.5
Democratic	Frank Legas	31,120	29.7
Libertarian	Loren Meierding	3,000	2.8
Total votes		105,268	100.0
Republican hold			

=== 1996 ===
1996 California State Assembly 72nd district election
Party	Candidate	Votes	%
Republican	Dick Ackerman (incumbent)	103,800	100.0
Total votes		103,800	100.0
Republican hold			

=== 1995 (special) ===
1995 California State Assembly 72nd district special election Vacancy resulting from the resignation of Ross Johnson
Party	Candidate	Votes	%
Republican	Dick Ackerman	17,503	77.7
Democratic	Shirley M. Hafner	5,020	22.3
Total votes		22,523	100.0
Republican hold			

=== 1994 ===
1994 California State Assembly 72nd district election
Party	Candidate	Votes	%
Republican	Ross Johnson (incumbent)	78,577	71.0
Democratic	Allan L. Dollison	27,086	24.5
Libertarian	Geoffrey Brown	4,933	4.5
Total votes		110,596	100.0
Republican hold			

=== 1992 ===
1992 California State Assembly 72nd district election
Party	Candidate	Votes	%
Republican	Ross Johnson (incumbent)	86,622	61.2
Democratic	Paul Garza, Jr.	45,934	32.4
Libertarian	Geoffrey Braun	9,076	6.4
Total votes		141,632	100.0
Republican gain from Democratic			

=== 1990 ===
1990 California State Assembly 72nd district election
Party	Candidate	Votes	%
Democratic	Tom Umberg	25,247	51.9
Republican	Curt Pringle (incumbent)	23,411	48.1
Total votes		48,658	100.0
Democratic gain from Republican			

== See also ==
- California State Assembly
- California State Assembly districts
- Districts in California
