= Ben A. Hill =

American politician (1892–1976)

Member of the California State Assembly from the 72nd district
- In office January 5, 1931 - January 2, 1933
- Preceded by: Willard E. Badham
- Succeeded by: Hobart R. Alter

Personal details
- Born: April 22, 1892 Owensboro, Kentucky, U.S.
- Died: April 23, 1976 (aged 84) California, U.S.
- Party: Republican
- Spouse: Marie Shellenbach (m. 1920)
- Children: 2

Military service
- Branch/service: United States Army
- Battles/wars: World War I

Ben A. Hill (April 22, 1892 – April 23, 1976) was an American politician who was a member of the California State Assembly for the 72nd district from 1931 to 1933. He also served in the United States Army during World War I.
