= Ronald Cordova =

American lawyer and politician

Member of the California State Assembly from the 74th district
- In office December 6, 1976 - November 30, 1978
- Preceded by: Robert Badham
- Succeeded by: Marian Bergeson

Personal details
- Born: August 18, 1946 (age 79) Los Angeles, California, US
- Party: Democratic
- Spouse: Mariann
- Education: Beverly Hills High School; Dartmouth College; University of Southern California Law School

Ronald Michael Cordova (born August 18, 1946) is an American lawyer and politician.

Born in Los Angeles, California, Cordova graduated from Beverly Hills High School, Dartmouth College and the University of Southern California Law School. Cordova practices law in Irvine, California. From 1976 to 1978, Cordova served in the California State Assembly as a Democrat.
