= Amanda Renteria =

American political aide (born 1974)

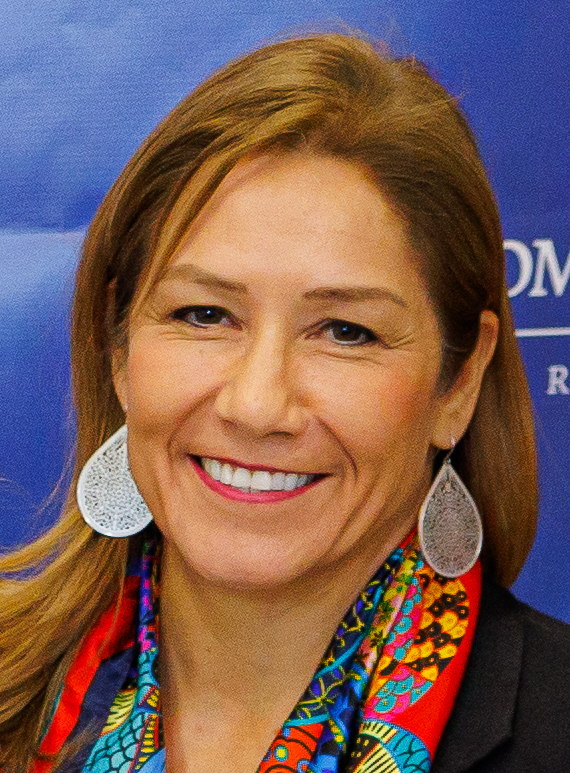
- Renteria in 2025
- Born: Amanda Andrea Renteria; November 15, 1974 (age 52); Woodlake, California, U.S.
- Education: Stanford University (BA); Harvard University (MBA)
- Political party: Democratic

Amanda Andrea Renteria (born November 15, 1974) is the current CEO of Code for America.

Under Renteria's leadership, Code for America was awarded $100M in coordinated commitments through The Audacious Project and Blue Meridian Partners to modernize social safety net infrastructure. Renteria announced the project at TED in 2022.

Renteria served as a member of President Joe Biden’s Advisory Commission on Advancing Educational Equity, Excellence, and Economic Opportunity for Hispanics and serves on the Treasury Advisory Commission on Racial Equity. She is also a paid contributor to the BBC and ABC News on policy and political matters in the United States.

Renteria is recognized for her role as the National Political Director for Hillary Clinton's 2016 presidential campaign, and her service as the Chief of Operations for California Attorney General Xavier Becerra. Renteria also made history as the first Latina Chief of Staff in the U.S. Senate working for United States Senators Dianne Feinstein and Debbie Stabenow. Renteria has twice run for public office.

== Code for America ==
Renteria was named CEO of Code for America on May 1, 2020. "Amanda will lead Code for America at a moment when the need to transform government could not be clearer,” said Code for America board chair John Lilly. Renteria’s vision was for Code for America to continue to focus on human-centered design that puts the needs of users — members of the country’s most vulnerable communities — at the center of all they create.

During COVID-19 pandemic, Renteria focused Code for America’s efforts on several emergency initiatives that helped families access food and resources across the country. One of their most recognizable efforts was partnering with the Administration and VITA to build a simple, bilingual online tax filing tool to help low income families access their tax benefits, which included 2020 stimulus checks, Earned Income Tax Credits, and the Advanced Child Tax Credit. “Using the Get Your Refund website or mobile app, filers can verify their identities and upload tax documents, then talk to a volunteer who will prepare their return, all without meeting with someone in person.”

In April 2022, Renteria announced that Code for America had been added to the Audacious Project, aiming to transform the US benefits system and deliver user-centric and digital-first social services to more than 13 million Americans. “There are unseen heroes in government working directly with people every day, navigating old systems,” Renteria said in a press release. “We can and must equip them with the kind of tools and data they need to streamline their efforts and create a truly human-centered safety net that meets the needs of millions of people in America.”

In October, 2023, the first collective bargaining agreement was signed. “Today’s agreement marks a truly historic moment for Code for America, the civic tech community, and the entire nonprofit sector,” said Renteria.

== 2014 congressional candidacy ==
Renteria ran for Congress in California's 21st congressional district. On announcing her candidacy, she stated, "I'm running because I grew up here, and I believe the Valley needs a strong voice in Washington. We have to have folks who know how to work across the aisle, and who know how to be effective." Republican David Valadao holds the seat. In the June 3 primary, Renteria received 11,682 votes and about 25.6% overall, ahead of fellow Democrat John Hernandez, but fell nearly 40% behind Valadao, thus becoming the Democratic nominee. At the time of the primary, Cook Political Report considered the seat to be “likely Republican.”

On July 20, 2014, both Maryland Governor Martin O'Malley and representative Nancy Pelosi held a fundraiser to support Renteria's candidacy. President Barack Obama also appeared at a fundraiser with Renteria, calling her one of “two outstanding candidates and part of what it is that we’re just trying to build here and across the country." According to the Fresno Bee, the Democratic Congressional Campaign Committee reserved $1 million for ads in September in her district. On October 7 Vice President Joe Biden spoke at a fundraiser for Renteria.

On the Affordable Care Act, The Hill reported Renteria as saying that “something needed to be done at the time and that she opposes repealing the law now.”

In October 2014, Roll Call reported that the Democratic Congressional Campaign Committee announced plans to cut campaign ads in the final two weeks of the campaign, "a signal the party does not see a path to victory for these candidates or races."

In the November 4 general election, Renteria lost to Valadao by an almost 58% to 42% margin.

== 2016 Clinton campaign ==
Renteria was hired to fill the position of political director for Hillary Clinton's 2016 presidential campaign

== Hillary Clinton email investigation ==
In early March 2016, hackers working with Dutch intelligence had reportedly provided a highly classified Russian government document to the FBI. The document, which had "possible translation issues," had purportedly contained a memorialization of an alleged conversation between Renteria and then-Attorney General Loretta Lynch. One of the allegations within the document said that Renteria had been assured that "Lynch would keep the Clinton investigation from going too far." Although the FBI determined that the document was not credible, then-FBI Director James Comey said it was "one of the bricks in the load" that led to his decision to not consult with the Department of Justice before closing the investigation.

== 2018 gubernatorial campaign ==
On February 20, 2018, Renteria announced her candidacy in the 2018 California gubernatorial election. Renteria finished seventh out of 27 candidates on the ballot in California's unique "top-two primary"; she received 86,287 votes, for 1.3% of the vote. Renteria finished behind Democratic candidates Lieutenant Governor Gavin Newsom (who advanced to the runoff with 33.5% of the vote), former Los Angeles Mayor Antonio Villaraigosa (13.2%), State Treasurer John Chiang (9.5%) and former Superintendent of Public Instruction Delaine Eastin (3.3%). She also finished behind Republicans John H. Cox (who advanced to the runoff against Newsom with 25.7% of the vote) and State Assemblyman Travis Allen (9.5%).

== Early career ==
After college, Renteria became a financial analyst for Goldman Sachs. She decided to move to the public sector to "make a difference," working for one year as a math teacher at her former high school in Woodlake and helping San Jose with a neighborhood revitalization initiative, before going to Harvard Business School.

Renteria became a member of Senator Dianne Feinstein's staff in 2005. She later took a job with Senator and Senate Agriculture Committee Chairwoman Debbie Stabenow as a legislative aid on economic issues. She was promoted to legislative director, and became Stabenow's chief of staff in 2008. Renteria was the first Latina chief of staff in Senate history.

In 2013, Renteria was considered for the role of chairman of the Commodity Futures Trading Commission, but withdrew her name from consideration. According to Reuters, “Washington policy-watchers widely assumed that Renteria would get the job, but last-minute questions about her perceived lack of experience got in the way.” Politico noted that “financial reform advocates reacted with shock to reports that the White House was considering her for the position.”

In August 2013, Renteria moved back to California, where she briefly worked as a substitute teacher before announcing her congressional candidacy.

== Personal life and education ==
Renteria's father emigrated from Mexico in the 1960s, settling in Woodlake, California; her mother was born in the United States. The second of three daughters, Renteria double-majored in economics and political science at Stanford University, writing her senior honors thesis on women in politics. She played basketball and softball for the Stanford Cardinal. She also earned an MBA from Harvard Business School. Renteria lives in California, with her husband Patrick Brannelly, a managing director for a non-profit focused on brain-related diseases, and two children.

== Electoral history ==
=== California's 21st congressional district, 2014 ===
California's 21st congressional district election, 2014
Primary election
| Party | Candidate | Votes | % |
|---|---|---|---|
| Republican | David Valadao (incumbent) | 28,773 | 63.0 |
| Democratic | Amanda Renteria | 11,682 | 25.6 |
| Democratic | John Hernandez | 5,232 | 11.5 |
| Total votes | | 45,687 | 100.0 |
General election
| Republican | David Valadao (incumbent) | 45,907 | 57.8 |
| Democratic | Amanda Renteria | 33,470 | 42.2 |
| Total votes | | 79,377 | 100.0 |
| Republican hold | | | |

=== California gubernatorial election, 2018 ===
Non-partisan blanket primary results
| Party | Candidate | Votes | % |
|---|---|---|---|
| Democratic | Gavin Newsom | 2,343,792 | 33.7% |
| Republican | John H. Cox | 1,766,488 | 25.4% |
| Democratic | Antonio Villaraigosa | 926,394 | 13.3% |
| Republican | Travis Allen | 658,798 | 9.5% |
| Democratic | John Chiang | 655,920 | 9.4% |
| Democratic | Delaine Eastin | 234,869 | 3.4% |
| Democratic | Amanda Renteria | 93,446 | 1.3% |
| Republican | Robert C. Newman II | 44,674 | 0.6% |
| Democratic | Michael Shellenberger | 31,692 | 0.5% |
| Republican | Peter Y. Liu | 27,336 | 0.4% |
| Republican | Yvonne Girard | 21,840 | 0.3% |
| Peace and Freedom | Gloria La Riva | 19,075 | 0.3% |
| Democratic | J. Bribiesca | 18,586 | 0.3% |
| Green | Josh Jones | 16,131 | 0.2% |
| Libertarian | Zoltan Istvan | 14,462 | 0.2% |
| Democratic | Albert Caesar Mezzetti | 12,026 | 0.2% |
| Libertarian | Nickolas Wildstar | 11,566 | 0.2% |
| Democratic | Robert Davidson Griffis | 11,103 | 0.2% |
| Democratic | Akinyemi Agbede | 9,380 | 0.1% |
| Democratic | Thomas Jefferson Cares | 8,937 | 0.1% |
| Green | Christopher N. Carlson | 7,302 | 0.1% |
| Democratic | Klement Tinaj | 5,368 | 0.1% |
| No party preference | Hakan "Hawk" Mikado | 5,346 | 0.1% |
| No party preference | Johnny Wattenburg | 4,973 | 0.1% |
| No party preference | Desmond Silveira | 4,633 | 0.1% |
| No party preference | Shubham Goel | 4,020 | 0.1% |
| No party preference | Jeffrey Edward Taylor | 3,973 | 0.1% |
| Green | Veronika Fimbres (write-in) | 62 | 0.0% |
| No party preference | Arman Soltani (write-in) | 32 | 0.0% |
| No party preference | Peter Crawford Valentino (write-in) | 21 | 0.0% |
| Republican | K. Pearce (write-in) | 8 | 0.0% |
| No party preference | Armando M. Arreola (write-in) | 1 | 0.0% |
| Total votes | | 6,862,254 | 100% |
