= Marian Bergeson =

American politician (1925–2016)

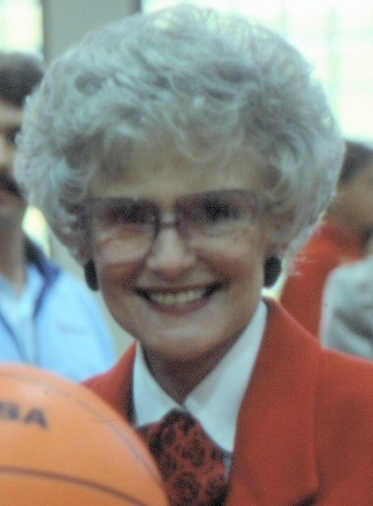

Member of the California State Senate
- In office December 3, 1984 – January 3, 1995
- Preceded by: Paul B. Carpenter (37th); John Lewis (35th)
- Succeeded by: David G. Kelley (37th); Ross Johnson (35th)
- Constituency: 37th (1984–1992); 35th (1992–1995)

Member of the California State Assembly
- In office December 4, 1978 – November 30, 1984
- Preceded by: Ronald Cordova (74th); John Lewis (70th)
- Succeeded by: Robert C. Frazee (74th); Gil Ferguson (70th)
- Constituency: 74th (1978–1982); 70th (1982–1984)

Personal details
- Born: August 31, 1925 Salt Lake City, Utah
- Died: July 6, 2016 (aged 90) Newport Beach, California
- Party: Republican
- Spouse: Garth Bergeson (m. 1950)
- Children: Nancy, Garth Jr., Julie, James

Marian C. Bergeson (August 31, 1925 – July 6, 2016) was an American politician from California. A Republican, she became the first woman to serve in both the California State Assembly and California State Senate, she was a member of the California State Legislature from 1978 to 1995, a member of the Orange County Board of Supervisors from 1995 to 1996, and California State Secretary of Education from 1996 to 1999. In 1986, Marian Bergeson Elementary School in Laguna Niguel was named after her.

== Early life and family ==
Born in Salt Lake City, Utah, Bergeson earned a Bachelor of Arts in Elementary Education from Brigham Young University. A resident of Newport Beach, California, Bergeson and her husband, Garth, had four children (Nancy, Garth Jr., Julie, and James) and eleven grandchildren. Her daughter Nancy was an attorney in Portland, Oregon, before her murder in 2009.

Bergeson was a member of the Church of Jesus Christ of Latter-day Saints.

== Political career ==
Elected to the Newport-Mesa Unified School District Board of Education in 1964, she was reelected to the board in 1968, 1972, and 1976. In 1978, Bergeson won 74% of the vote to be elected as California State Assemblywoman for the 74th Assembly District. In 1980, she won 74% of the vote in a three-way race to be re-elected to her seat. In 1982, she again won 74% of the vote for re-election after her district was renumbered as the 70th Assembly District after the 1980s redistricting.

Bergeson made history in 1984 by becoming the first woman to have won election as both a California state assemblymember and state senator after she won 74% of the vote to be elected as California state senator for the 37th Senate District. Bergeson was re-elected in 1988 with 71% of the vote in a three-way race.

In 1990, Bergeson ran for Lieutenant Governor of California. The winner of the 1990 election for lieutenant governor was poised to make history, as Bergeson would have been the first woman to be lieutenant governor while incumbent Leo T. McCarthy would have been the first lieutenant governor to win a third term. Bergeson was unable to unseat the incumbent McCarthy, losing by a margin of 51%-42%.

Bergeson was elected to her third term as a state senator in 1992, winning 62.2% of the vote in a three-way race in her district after it was partially redrawn and renumbered the 35th District in the 1990s redistricting.

In 1994, Bergeson won more than 98% of the vote to win the election as an Orange County supervisor, representing the 5th District.

Bergeson resigned from her supervisorial seat in 1996 when she was appointed by Governor Pete Wilson as California secretary of education. In 1999, outgoing Republican governor Wilson and incoming Democratic governor Gray Davis agreed to appoint Bergeson to the California State Board of Education.

Governor Arnold Schwarzenegger appointed Bergeson to a four-year term on the California Transportation Commission in 2004 and reappointed her for a second term in 2008.

Bergeson died at the age of 90 due to complications from surgery for pancreatic cancer at Hoag Hospital in Newport Beach, California.

California Assembly
Preceded by Ronald Cordova	California State Assemblymember; 74th District; December 4, 1978 – November 30, 1982	Succeeded by Robert C. Frazee
Preceded by John R. Lewis	California State Assemblymember; 70th District; December 6, 1982 – November 30, 1984	Succeeded by Gil Ferguson
California Senate
Preceded by Paul B. Carpenter	California state senator 37th District; December 3, 1984 – November 30, 1992	Succeeded by David G. Kelley
Preceded by John R. Lewis	California state senator 35th District; December 7, 1992 – January 3, 1995	Succeeded by Ross Johnson
Political offices
Preceded by Thomas F. Riley	Orange County supervisor 5th District; January 3, 1995 – November 5, 1996	Succeeded by Thomas W. Wilson
Preceded by Maureen DiMarco	California Secretary of Education; 1996–1999	Succeeded by Gary K. Hart
