= Tyler Diep =

American politician

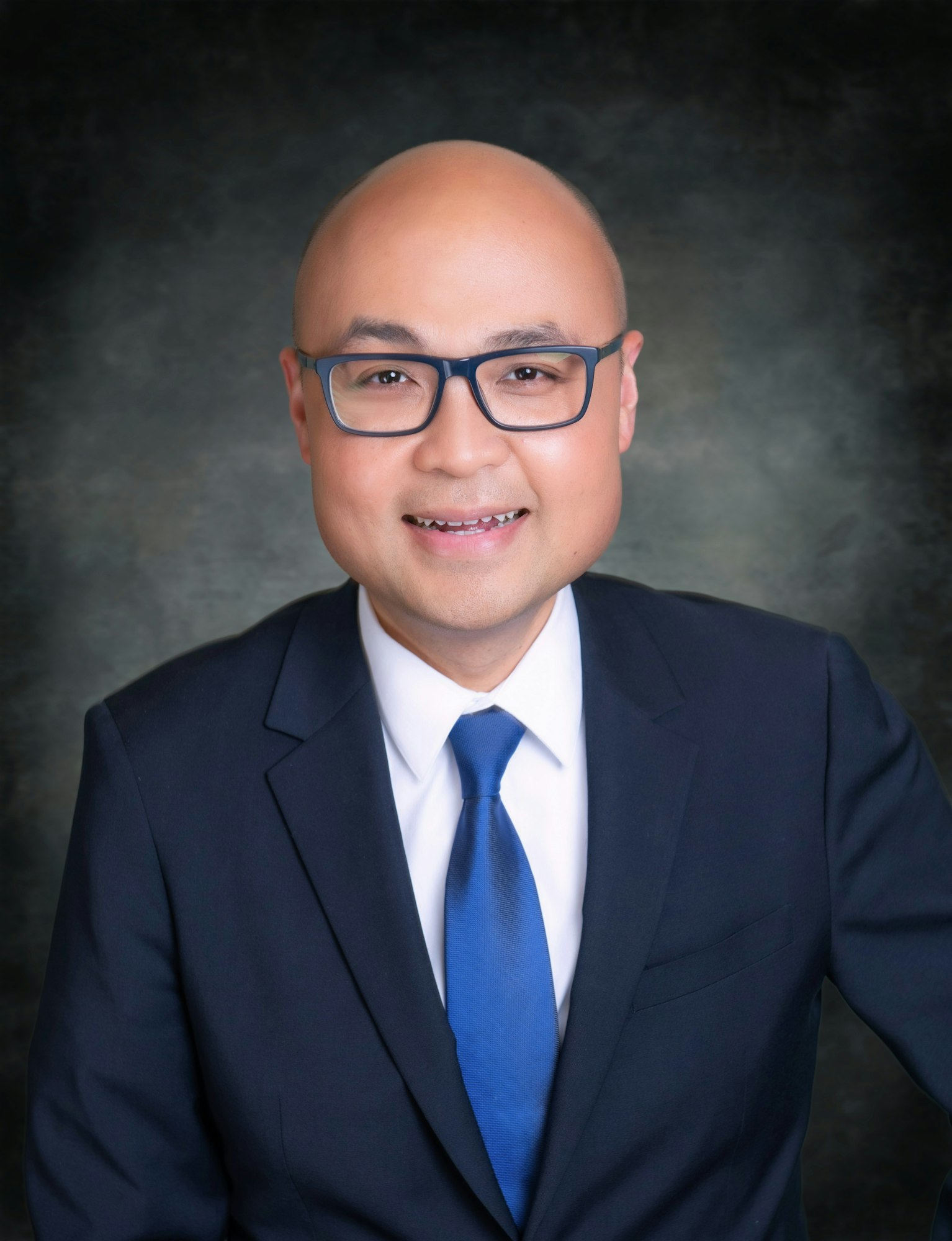
- Official portrait, 2024

Member of the California State Assembly from the 72nd district
- In office December 3, 2018 – November 30, 2020
- Preceded by: Travis Allen
- Succeeded by: Janet Nguyen

Personal details
- Born: Vietnam
- Party: Independent (2021–present); Republican (until 2021)
- Education: San Diego State University (BA)

Tyler Diep is a Vietnamese-American politician currently serving on the Midway City Sanitary District Board of Directors. He previously served one term in the California State Assembly. Formerly a Republican, he represented the 72nd Assembly District, which encompasses parts of northern coastal Orange County which includes the cities of Huntington Beach, Garden Grove, Westminster, Fountain Valley, Seal Beach, Los Alamitos, and the unincorporated areas of Midway City and Rossmoor.

== Political career ==
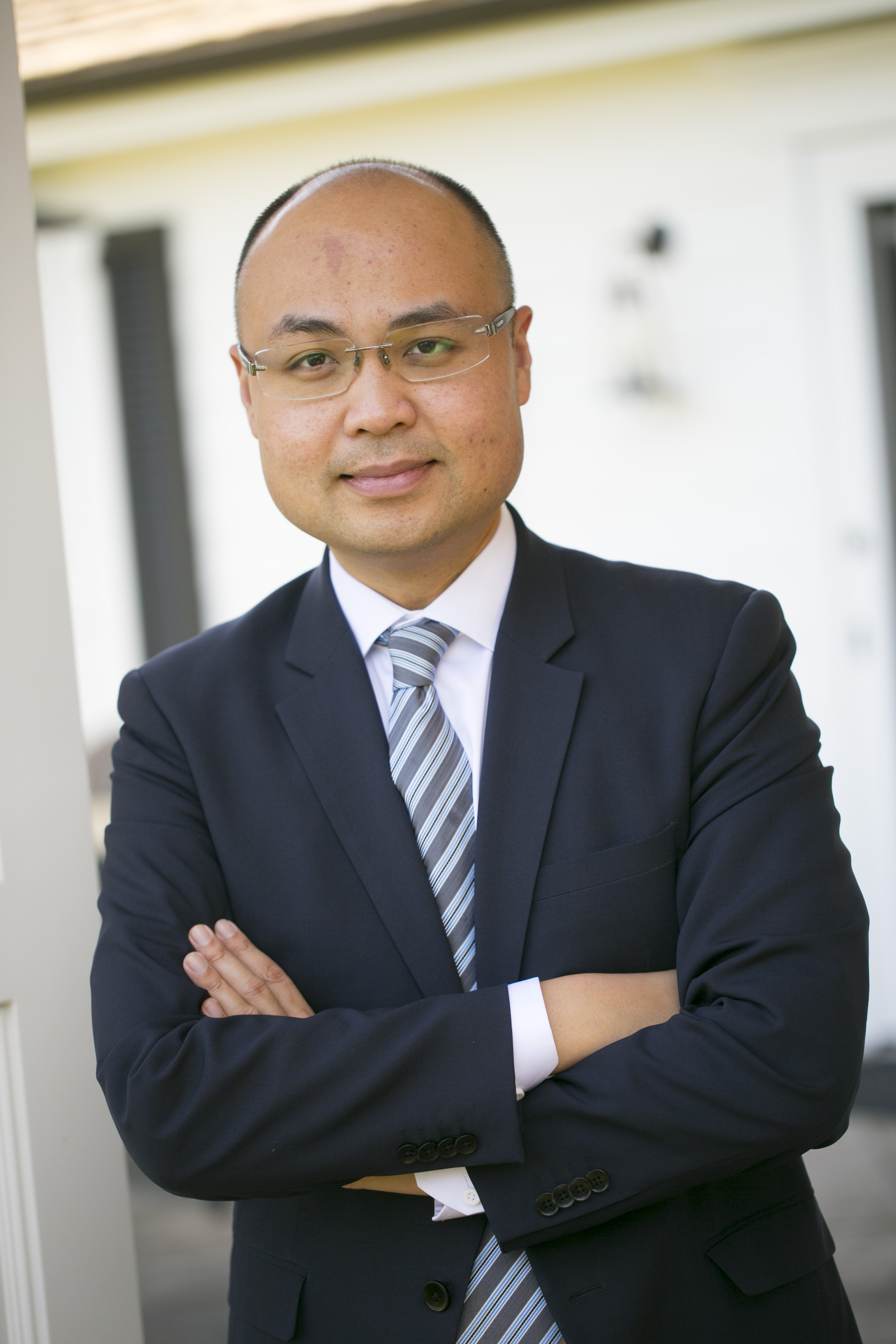
Diep in 2018

At the age of twenty-three, Diep was first elected as a director of the Midway City Sanitary District in 2006 and left this position at the end of 2018 after serving three consecutive 4-year terms due to his election to the State Assembly. After being defeated for re-election to the Assembly in the 2020 primary election, Diep successfully ran in the 2020 general election to return to a director's seat at the Midway City Sanitary District.

Concurrently with his initial tenure at the Midway City Sanitary District, Diep was also elected to the Westminster City Council in 2008 and in 2014. He was selected as Vice Mayor in 2010 and 2018. Professionally, he served as a senior adviser and small business outreach specialist with the California State Board of Equalization and the California Department of Tax and Fee Administration. In addition, he is also a small business owner in Huntington Beach.

For the 2019–20 legislative session, Diep served as vice-chair for the Housing and Community Development Committee and the Committee on Arts, Entertainment, Sports, Tourism, and Internet Media. He also served as a member of the Appropriations, Public Safety, Transportation, Labor and Employment, and the Joint Legislative Audit Committee.

In July 2019, Diep apologized for using anti-semitic stereotypes in his campaign mailers the previous year against his opponent, Josh Lowenthal. The stereotypes in question depicted Lowenthal "with an enlarged nose and clutching $100 bills."

In 2019, Diep introduced a bill, AB 317, to prohibit private companies from selling DMV appointments. It passed.

In the state Assembly, Diep compiled a moderate record and broke with his party on key issues. Lyft funded a $2 million campaign to unseat Diep, due to his stance on Assembly Bill 5, which categorized rideshare drivers as employees rather than independent contractors. Uber also gave $200,000 to a similar PAC. Partly as a result, he was defeated in the primary by former state Senator Janet Nguyen, who went on to win the November general election.

In an NPR interview radio interview that aired November 2, 2022, Diep announced he left the Republican Party and is currently registered without party preference. Diep cites the January 6, 2021 insurrection and the rhetoric of Donald Trump as his main reasons for leaving the Republican Party.

== Personal life ==
Diep graduated with a degree in public administration from San Diego State University and currently resides in Westminster.

=== 2018 election results ===
California's 72nd State Assembly district election, 2018
Primary election
| Party | Candidate | Votes | % |
|---|---|---|---|
| Democratic | Josh Lowenthal | 34,462 | 36.8 |
| Republican | Tyler Diep | 27,825 | 29.7 |
| Republican | Greg Haskin | 19,199 | 20.5 |
| Republican | Long Pham | 7,692 | 8.2 |
| Republican | Richard Laird | 4,555 | 5.0 |
| Total votes | | 93,733 | 100.0 |
General election
| Republican | Tyler Diep | 83,221 | 51.6 |
| Democratic | Josh Lowenthal | 78,080 | 48.4 |
| Total votes | | 161,301 | 100.0 |
| Republican hold | | | |

=== 2020 election ===
2020 California's 72nd State Assembly district primary results by county supervisorial district Map legend: J. Nguyen—30–40%

2020 California's 72nd State Assembly district election
Primary election
| Party | Candidate | Votes | % |
|---|---|---|---|
| Republican | Janet Nguyen | 39,778 | 33.8 |
| Democratic | Diedre Nguyen | 30,021 | 25.5 |
| Republican | Tyler Diep (incumbent) | 29,186 | 24.8 |
| Democratic | Bijan Mohseni | 18,668 | 15.9 |
| Total votes | | 117,163 | 100.0 |
