= Jim Brulte =

American politician (born 1956)

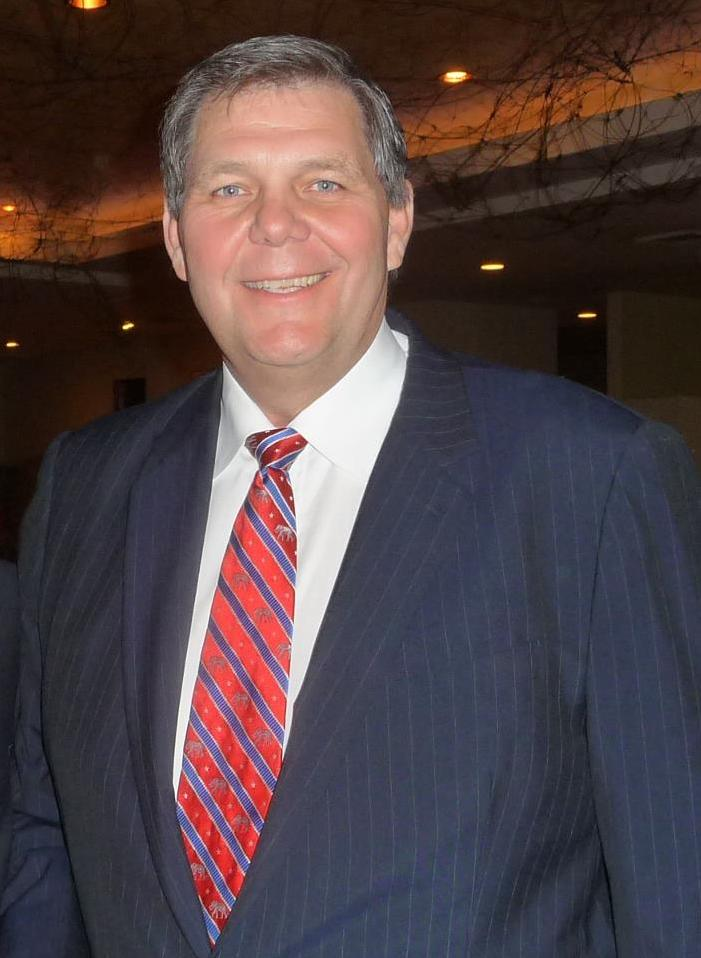

Chair of the California Republican Party
- In office March 3, 2013 – February 24, 2019
- Preceded by: Tom Del Beccaro
- Succeeded by: Jessica Patterson

Minority Leader of the California Senate
- In office December 4, 2000 – November 30, 2004
- Preceded by: Ross Johnson
- Succeeded by: Dick Ackerman

Member of the California Senate from the 31st district
- In office December 2, 1996 - November 30, 2004
- Preceded by: Bill Leonard
- Succeeded by: Robert Dutton

Majority Leader of the California Assembly
- In office June 5, 1995 – August 22, 1995
- Preceded by: Thomas M. Hannigan
- Succeeded by: Curt Pringle

Minority Leader of the California Assembly
- In office November 4, 1992 – June 5, 1995
- Preceded by: Bill Jones
- Succeeded by: Willie Brown

Member of the California State Assembly
- In office December 3, 1990 – November 30, 1996
- Preceded by: Charles Bader
- Succeeded by: Bill Leonard
- Constituency: 65th district (1990–1992); 63rd district (1992–1996)

Personal details
- Born: April 13, 1956 (age 70) Glen Cove, New York, U.S.
- Party: Republican
- Education: California State Polytechnic; University, Pomona (BA)
- Awards: National Airman of the Year (1977)

Military service
- Allegiance: United States
- Branch/service: California Air National Guard
- Years of service: 1970s
- Rank: Airman

James L. Brulte (born April 13, 1956) is an American politician, former state legislator, and former chairman of the California Republican Party, having served from March 3, 2013 to February 24, 2019. Serving three consecutive terms as chairman, Brulte set the record for the longest tenure as chairman in the history of the state party. He was also the first, and currently remains the only, freshman to ever serve as a party leader in both houses of the California State Legislature.

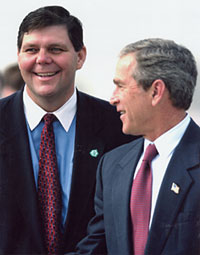
Brulte with President George W. Bush

== Early life and education ==
Brulte served in the California Air National Guard and was chosen as "Outstanding Airman of the Year" for the United States and its territories. He graduated from California State Polytechnic University, Pomona (Cal Poly Pomona). Brulte is married to the former Superintendent of Capistrano Unified School District, Kirsten Vital Brulte.

== Political career ==
He was elected to the Assembly in 1990 to represent San Bernardino County's 65th District, and was re-elected from the 63rd District in 1992 and 1994. In 1995, as the Majority Leader in the Assembly, Brulte was unable to prevent a Democrat from being elected Speaker of the Assembly. When term limits forced Brulte out of the Assembly, he ran for the State Senate's 31st district in 1996, winning the election with 56% of the vote. He was re-elected in 2000 with 59% of the vote. Brulte retired from the Senate in 2004 due to term limits. During his time in the State Senate, he served as Vice Chair of the Senate Budget and Fiscal Review Committee.

Brulte considered running for the State Board of Equalization in 2006; however, he decided not to run against Michelle Steel, the eventual victor.

Following the 2010 and 2012 election results in California, Brulte was widely encouraged to run for the chairmanship of the California Republican Party and was elected chairman on March 3, 2013. Coincidentally, Brulte was born in Glen Cove, New York as was his predecessor, Tom Del Beccaro.

Although out of office for almost two decades, in 2022 Brulte partnered with former California Insurance Commissioner Steve Poizner to bring the medical community and the legal community together to craft a legislative solution to end the decades long medical malpractice wars. Their compromise was enacted into law by the legislature and resulted in eliminating the need for an already qualified ballot initiative.

== Electoral history ==
California's 63rd State Assembly district election, 1992
Party	Candidate	Votes	%
Republican	Jim Brulte (incumbent)	76,888	56.06
Democratic	A. L. "Larry" Westwood	42,860	31.25
Green	Joseph “Joe" M. Desist	17,143	12.70
Invalid or blank votes		16,448	10.71
Total votes		153,339	100.00
Republican hold			

California's 63rd State Assembly district election, 1994
Party	Candidate	Votes	%
Republican	Jim Brulte (incumbent)	73,208	67.52
Democratic	Richard Edwards	35,217	32.48
Invalid or blank votes		9,950	8.41
Total votes		118,375	100.00
Republican hold			

California's 31st State Senate district election, 1996
Party	Candidate	Votes	%
Republican	Jim Brulte	143,537	56.17
Democratic	Gary George	103,217	41.83
Invalid or blank votes		17,795	6.73
Total votes		264,549	100.00
Republican hold			

California's 31st State Senate district election, 2000
Party	Candidate	Votes	%
Republican	Jim Brulte (incumbent)	153,745	58.79
Democratic	Michael D. Rayburn	97,931	37.45
Libertarian	Fritz R. Ward	9,851	3.77
Invalid or blank votes		0	0.00
Total votes		261,527	100.00
Republican hold			

California Assembly
Preceded by Charles Bader	Member of the California Assembly from the 65th district 1990–1992	Succeeded by Paul Woodruff
Preceded by Bob Epple	Member of the California Assembly from the 63rd district 1992–1996	Succeeded by Bill Leonard
Party political offices
Preceded by Bill Jones	Minority Leader of the California State Assembly; 1992–1995	Succeeded by Curt Pringle
Preceded by Ross Johnson	Minority Leader of the California State Senate; 2000–2004	Succeeded by Dick Ackerman
Preceded by Tom Del Beccaro	Chair of the California Republican Party; 2013–2019	Succeeded by Jessica Patterson
California Senate
Preceded by Bill Leonard	Member of the California Senate from the 31st district 1996–2004	Succeeded by Robert Dutton
Preceded by Ross Johnson	Minority Leader of the California Senate; 2000–2004	Succeeded by Dick Ackerman
