= Midway City Sanitary District =

Coordinates: 33.7525°N 117.9950°W

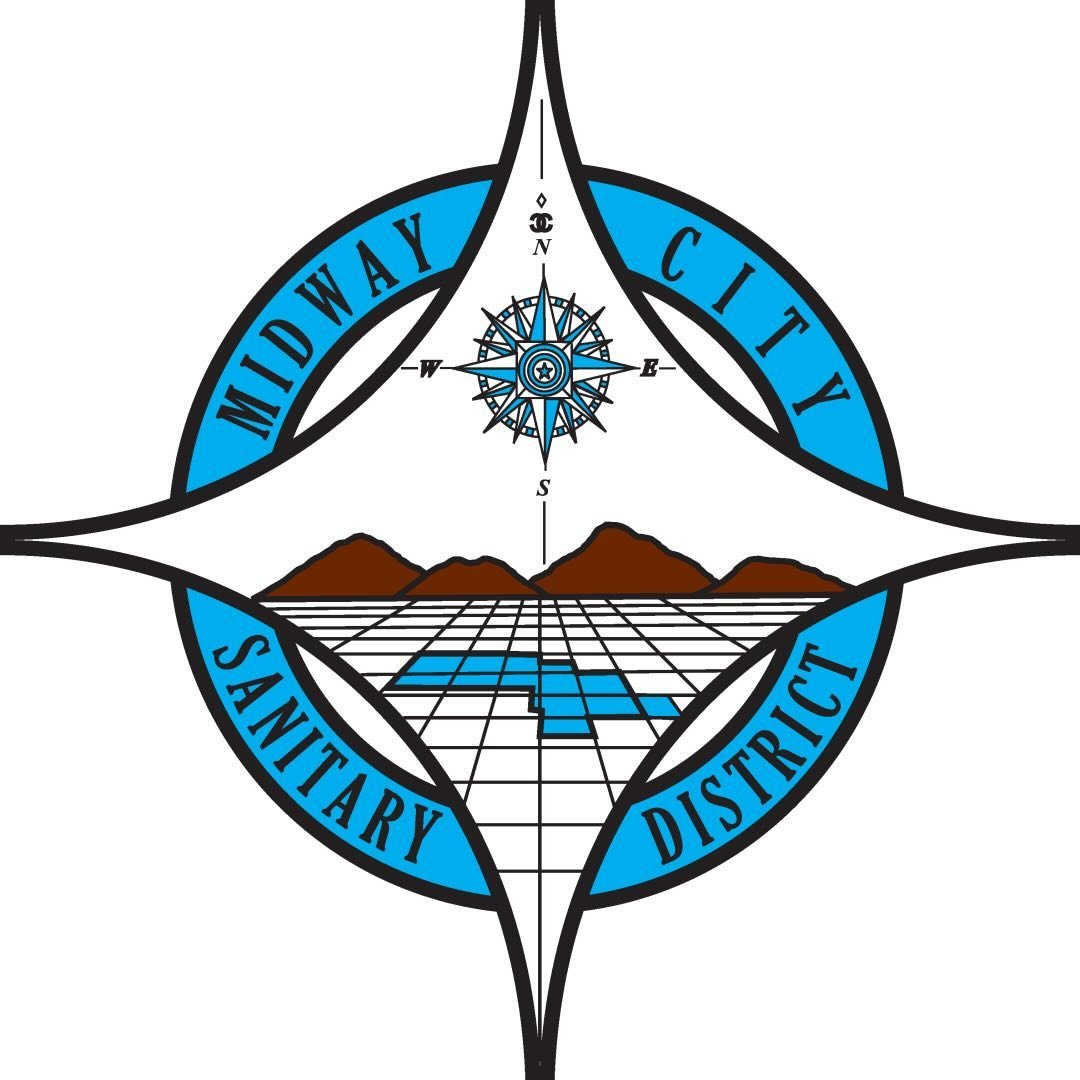

Special district overview
- Formed: January 1939
- Headquarters: 14451 Cedarwood Street, Westminster, California
- Special district executive: Robert Housley, General Manager
- Website: https://www.midwaycitysanitaryca.gov/

The Midway City Sanitary District (MCSD) is a special district that manages wastewater and solid waste services to Westminster and unincorporated Midway City. It is the only in-house trash collection agency left in Orange County, all other agency contract out that service.

== History ==
The Midway City Sanitary District was formed in January 1939 under the Sanitary District Act of 1923.

Following demands of an 8% pay raise from MCSD employees in 1985 and the board not offering any counterproposals, workers went on strike. The strike ended after three days after a $1.25 rate hike was imposed and a 1% increase in pay was proposed by board members. However, union representatives did not continue bargaining until after the 1985 election where three incumbents were on the ballot as well as a ballot measure which, if passed, would have the district place advisory measures on future ballots before increasing rates. Following a 12% countywide turnout, two challengers displaced two incumbents on the board.

During the 1988 campaign for the board of directors, campaign mudslinging involved two incumbent directors on opposing sides, accusations of inexperience and being power hungry, and a union flyer that linked consideration of contracting out trash and sewer service to the mafia. Both incumbents were reelected.

In 1993, the city of Garden Grove applied to the Orange County LAFCO to take over the Garden Grove Sanitary District and the portion of the Midway City Sanitary District within Garden Grove. By September 1995, action had still not been taken on Garden Grove's application, causing frustration with local elected officials. By 1997, the reorganization of the Garden Grove Sanitary District into the city of Garden Grove was complete and a portion of the territory of MCSD was removed to make the boundaries more contiguous with the city of Westminster.

The board in 2014 censured one of its members, Al Krippner, following allegations of physical and verbal assault at a district event. Krippner, along with fellow Board member Frank Cobo had previously faced controversy for charging a stipend for attending a community concert.

A compressed natural gas fueling station to fuel its trucks was opened in 2015.

== Governance ==
Midway City Sanitary District is governed by a five-member Board of Directors, each elected at-large to a four-year term. The current members of the Board are:

| Board Member | Term began | Term ends |
|---|---|---|
| Sergio Contreras | 2022 | 2026 |
| Mark Nguyen | 2022 | 2026 |
| Andrew Nguyen | 2022 | 2026 |
| Chi Charlie Nguyen | 2024 | 2028 |
| Tyler Diep | 2024 | 2028 |
