= Ross Johnson (politician) =

American politician (1939–2017)

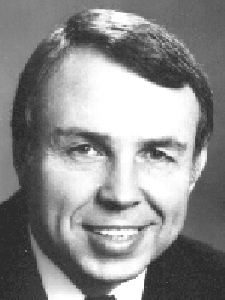

Minority Leader of the California Senate
- In office March 16, 1998 – April 27, 2000
- Preceded by: Rob Hurtt
- Succeeded by: Jim Brulte

Member of the California Senate from the 35th district
- In office May 11, 1995 – November 30, 2004
- Preceded by: Marian Bergeson
- Succeeded by: John B. T. Campbell III

Minority Leader of the California Assembly
- In office November 10, 1988 – July 17, 1991
- Preceded by: Pat Nolan
- Succeeded by: Bill Jones

Member of the California State Assembly
- In office December 4, 1978 – May 11, 1995
- Preceded by: William E. Dannemeyer
- Succeeded by: Dick Ackerman
- Constituency: 72nd district (1992–1995); 64th district (1982–1992); 69th district (1978–1982)

Personal details
- Born: September 28, 1939 North Dakota, US
- Died: August 16, 2017 (aged 77) Sacramento, California, US
- Party: Republican
- Spouse: Diane Morris (m. 1968)
- Children: 2
- Education: California State University, Fullerton (BA); Western State College of Law (JD)

Military service
- Branch/service: United States Navy

James Ross Johnson (September 28, 1939 – August 16, 2017) was an American politician and lawyer. He was the first person in the California Legislature to become his party's leader in both the State Assembly and State Senate.

From Irvine, California, Johnson went to California State University, Fullerton and Western State College of Law. He practiced law. Johnson served in the California State Assembly from 1978 to 1995 and then served in the California State Senate from 1995 to 2004. Johnson was involved with the Republican Party. From 2007 to 2010, Johnson served as the chair of the California Fair Political Practices Commission.

On August 16, 2017, Johnson died of cancer in Sacramento, California at the age of 77.

California Assembly
Preceded by William Dannemeyer	Member of the California State Assembly from the 69th district December 4, 1978–November 30, 1982	Succeeded by Nolan Frizzelle
Preceded by M. David Stirling	Member of the California State Assembly from the 64th district December 6, 1982–November 30, 1992	Succeeded by Ted Weggeland
Preceded by Tom Umberg	Member of the California State Assembly from the 72nd district December 7, 1992–May 11, 1995	Succeeded by Dick Ackerman
Party political offices
Preceded by Pat Nolan	Minority Leader of the California State Assembly; November 10, 1988–July 17, 1991	Succeeded by Bill Jones
Preceded by Rob Hurtt	Minority Leader of the California State Senate; March 16, 1998–April 27, 2000	Succeeded by Jim Brulte
California Senate
Preceded by Marian Bergeson	Member of the California State Senate from the 35th district May 11, 1995–November 30, 2004	Succeeded by John Campbell
Political offices
Preceded by Liane Randolph	Chairman of the California Fair Political Practices Commission; February 14, 2007–April 30, 2010	Succeeded by Daniel Schnur
