= 2006 California State Assembly election =

- November 7, 2006

All 80 seats in the California State Assembly 41 seats needed for a majority
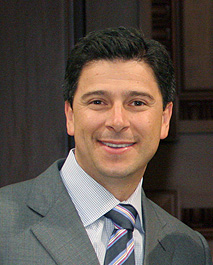

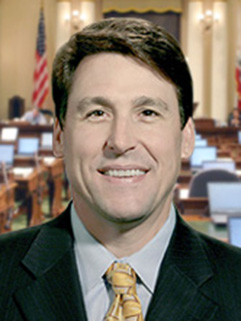
	Majority party	Minority party
Leader	Fabian Núñez	George Plescia (retired as leader)
Party	Democratic	Republican
Leader's seat	46th–Los Angeles	75th–San Diego
Last election	48 seats, 52.61%	32 seats, 44.26%
Seats won	48	32
Seat change	Steady	Steady
Popular vote	4,406,601	3,524,702
Percentage	54.36%	43.48%
- Democratic hold Republican hold 50–60% 60–70% 70–80% 80–90% >90% 50–60% 60–70% 70–80%
Speaker before election
Fabian Núñez
Democratic
Elected Speaker
Fabian Núñez
Democratic

The 2006 California State Assembly elections were held on November 7, 2006. Voters in all 80 districts of the California State Assembly voted for their representatives. The California Democratic Party retained its majority with 48 seats. The California Republican Party retained control of the remaining 32 seats. Neither party lost or gained any seats.

== Overview ==
California State Assembly elections, 2006
Party	Votes	Percentage	Incumbents	Open	Before	After	+/–
Democratic	4,406,601	54.36%	36	12	48	48	0
Republican	3,524,702	43.48%	18	14	31	32	+1
Libertarian	122,036	1.51%	0	0	0	0	0
Peace and Freedom	29,726	0.37%	0	0	0	0	0
Green	22,472	0.28%	0	0	0	0	0
Independent	51	0.00%	0	0	0	0	0
Vacant^{[A]}	—	—	—	—	1	0	–1
Invalid or blank votes	793,471	8.92%	—	—	—	—	—
Totals	8,899,059	100.00%	54	26	80	80	—

^{A} The 67th State Assembly district was left vacant after Republican Tom Harman won a special election to fill the 35th State Senate district on June 12, 2006. There was not enough time to schedule a special election for the Assembly seat, but Republican Jim Silva succeeded him after winning this election.

↓
48	32
Democratic	Republican

== Predictions ==
Source	Ranking	As of
Rothenberg	Safe D	November 4, 2006

== Results ==
The following are the final results from the Secretary of State of California.

=== District 1 ===
California's 1st State Assembly district election, 2006
Party	Candidate	Votes	%
Democratic	Patty Berg (incumbent)	99,626	64.74
Republican	Ray Tyrone	47,196	30.67
Libertarian	Thomas Reed	7,011	4.56
Independent	Robert Parker (write-in)	51	0.03
Total votes		153,884	100.00
Turnout			66.32
Democratic hold			

=== District 2 ===
California's 2nd State Assembly district election, 2006
Party	Candidate	Votes	%
Republican	Doug LaMalfa (incumbent)	95,723	68.07
Democratic	Melvin Smith	41,425	29.46
Peace and Freedom	Phil Dynan	3,474	2.47
Total votes		140,622	100.00
Turnout			64.24
Republican hold			

=== District 3 ===
California's 3rd State Assembly district election, 2006
Party	Candidate	Votes	%
Republican	Rick Keene (incumbent)	87,758	61.00
Democratic	Michael J. Harrington	56,101	39.00
Total votes		143,859	100.00
Turnout			62.09
Republican hold			

=== District 4 ===
California's 4th State Assembly district election, 2006
Party	Candidate	Votes	%
Republican	Ted Gaines	96,958	58.83
Democratic	Robert Haswell	57,401	34.83
Libertarian	Michael Murphy	5,423	3.29
Green	Gerald Fritts	5,025	3.05
Total votes		164,807	100.00
Turnout			66.07
Republican hold			

=== District 5 ===
California's 5th State Assembly district election, 2006
Party	Candidate	Votes	%
Republican	Roger Niello (incumbent)	84,334	61.68
Democratic	Brandon Bell	48,325	35.34
Peace and Freedom	Mike Lopez	4,068	2.98
Total votes		136,727	100.00
Turnout			57.74
Republican hold			

=== District 6 ===
California's 6th State Assembly district election, 2006
Party	Candidate	Votes	%
Democratic	Jared Huffman	106,589	65.84
Republican	Michael Hartnett	43,864	27.09
Green	Cat Woods	6,922	4.28
Libertarian	Richard Olmstead	4,519	2.79
Total votes		161,894	100.00
Turnout			72.50
Democratic hold			

=== District 7 ===
California's 7th State Assembly district election, 2006
Party	Candidate	Votes	%
Democratic	Noreen Evans (incumbent)	99,262	98.55
Republican	Raylene Wiesner (write-in)	1,464	1.45
Total votes		100,726	100.00
Turnout			57.39
Democratic hold			

=== District 8 ===
California's 8th State Assembly district election, 2006
Party	Candidate	Votes	%
Democratic	Lois Wolk (incumbent)	78,171	66.02
Republican	John Gould	40,238	33.98
Total votes		118,409	100.00
Turnout			61.78
Democratic hold			

=== District 9 ===
California's 9th State Assembly district election, 2006
Party	Candidate	Votes	%
Democratic	Dave Jones (incumbent)	61,932	69.91
Republican	William Chan	26,652	30.09
Total votes		88,584	100.00
Turnout			50.64
Democratic hold			

=== District 10 ===
California's 10th State Assembly district election, 2006
Party	Candidate	Votes	%
Republican	Alan Nakanishi (incumbent)	84,455	60.79
Democratic	Jim Cook	46,858	33.73
Libertarian	Janice Bonser	4,636	3.34
Peace and Freedom	Albert Troyer	1,974	1.42
Total votes		138,923	100.00
Turnout			58.43
Republican hold			

=== District 11 ===
California's 11th State Assembly district election, 2006
Party	Candidate	Votes	%
Democratic	Mark DeSaulnier	69,054	66.50
Republican	Arne Simonsen	31,048	29.90
Libertarian	Cory Nott	3,743	3.60
Total votes		104,845	100.00
Turnout			59.10
Democratic hold			

=== District 12 ===
California's 12th State Assembly district election, 2006
Party	Candidate	Votes	%
Democratic	Fiona Ma	73,922	71.00
Republican	Howard Epstein	17,020	16.35
Green	Barry Hermanson	13,174	12.65
Total votes		104,116	100.00
Turnout			50.90
Democratic hold			

=== District 13 ===
California's 13th State Assembly district election, 2006
Party	Candidate	Votes	%
Democratic	Mark Leno (incumbent)	110,937	86.88
Republican	Ramiro Maldonado	16,760	13.12
Total votes		127,697	100.00
Turnout			53.48
Democratic hold			

=== District 14 ===
California's 14th State Assembly district election, 2006
Party	Candidate	Votes	%
Democratic	Loni Hancock (incumbent)	116,879	81.72
Republican	Leigh Wolf	26,140	18.28
Total votes		143,019	100.00
Turnout			64.92
Democratic hold			

=== District 15 ===
California's 15th State Assembly district election, 2006
Party	Candidate	Votes	%
Republican	Guy Houston (incumbent)	89,039	54.79
Democratic	Terry Coleman	73,466	45.21
Total votes		157,505	100.00
Turnout			62.31
Republican hold			

=== District 16 ===
California's 16th State Assembly district election, 2006
Party	Candidate	Votes	%
Democratic	Sandré Swanson	91,696	90.10
Peace and Freedom	Edward Ytuarte	10,071	9.90
Total votes		101,767	100.00
Turnout			53.52
Democratic hold			

=== District 17 ===
California's 17th State Assembly district election, 2006
Party	Candidate	Votes	%
Democratic	Cathleen Galgiani	47,675	59.76
Republican	Gerald Machado	32,107	40.24
Total votes		79,782	100.00
Turnout			44.50
Democratic hold			

=== District 18 ===
California's 18th State Assembly district election, 2006
Party	Candidate	Votes	%
Democratic	Mary Hayashi	69,411	67.85
Republican	Jill Buck	32,897	32.15
Total votes		102,308	100.00
Turnout			55.96
Democratic hold			

=== District 19 ===
California's 19th State Assembly district election, 2006
Party	Candidate	Votes	%
Democratic	Gene Mullin (incumbent)	88,849	74.19
Republican	Elsie Gufler	30,908	25.81
Total votes		119,757	100.00
Turnout			61.03
Democratic hold			

=== District 20 ===
California's 20th State Assembly district election, 2006
Party	Candidate	Votes	%
Democratic	Alberto Torrico (incumbent)	61,238	65.30
Republican	Ken Nishimura	32,548	34.70
Total votes		93,786	100.00
Turnout			53.57
Democratic hold			

=== District 21 ===
California's 21st State Assembly district election, 2006
Party	Candidate	Votes	%
Democratic	Ira Ruskin (incumbent)	95,104	67.77
Republican	Virginia Kiraly	45,314	32.23
Total votes		140,418	100.00
Turnout			64.06
Democratic hold			

=== District 22 ===
California's 22nd State Assembly district election, 2006
Party	Candidate	Votes	%
Democratic	Sally Lieber (incumbent)	66,941	68.79
Republican	Roger Riffenburgh	30,369	31.21
Total votes		97,310	100.00
Turnout			59.56
Democratic hold			

=== District 23 ===
California's 23rd State Assembly district election, 2006
Party	Candidate	Votes	%
Democratic	Joe Coto (incumbent)	49,977	73.88
Republican	Mark Patrosso	17,671	26.12
Total votes		67,648	100.00
Turnout			51.58
Democratic hold			

=== District 24 ===
California's 24th State Assembly district election, 2006
Party	Candidate	Votes	%
Democratic	Jim Beall	75,769	65.25
Republican	Lawrence Hileman	36,425	31.37
Libertarian	Lionel Silva	3,934	3.39
Total votes		116,128	100.00
Turnout			60.13
Democratic hold			

=== District 25 ===
California's 25th State Assembly district election, 2006
Party	Candidate	Votes	%
Republican	Tom Berryhill	79,594	62.24
Democratic	James Bufford	42,158	32.97
Libertarian	Michael Dell'Orto	6,123	4.79
Total votes		127,875	100.00
Turnout			57.56
Republican hold			

=== District 26 ===
California's 26th State Assembly district election, 2006
Party	Candidate	Votes	%
Republican	Greg Aghazarian (incumbent)	54,703	58.39
Democratic	Kenneth Goeken	38,990	41.61
Total votes		93,693	100.00
Turnout			48.65
Republican hold			

=== District 27 ===
California's 27th State Assembly district election, 2006
Party	Candidate	Votes	%
Democratic	John Laird (incumbent)	99,530	70.12
Republican	Michael Morrison	42,411	29.88
Total votes		141,941	100.00
Turnout			48.65
Democratic hold			

=== District 28 ===
California's 28th State Assembly district election, 2006
Party	Candidate	Votes	%
Democratic	Anna Caballero	43,570	57.42
Republican	Ignacio Velazquez	32,303	42.58
Total votes		75,873	100.00
Turnout			55.76
Democratic hold			

=== District 29 ===
California's 29th State Assembly district election, 2006
Party	Candidate	Votes	%
Republican	Mike Villines (incumbent)	76,719	65.49
Democratic	Benjamin Avila	35,163	30.02
Peace and Freedom	John Crockford	3,784	3.23
Libertarian	Jonathan Zwickel	1,479	1.26
Total votes		117,145	100.00
Turnout			59.15
Republican hold			

=== District 30 ===
California's 30th State Assembly district election, 2006
Party	Candidate	Votes	%
Democratic	Nicole Parra (incumbent)	28,244	51.56
Republican	Danny Gilmore	26,527	48.44
Total votes		54,771	100.00
Turnout			46.16
Democratic hold			

=== District 31 ===
California's 31st State Assembly district election, 2006
Party	Candidate	Votes	%
Democratic	Juan Arambula (incumbent)	45,004	100.00
Turnout			44.65
Democratic hold			

=== District 32 ===
California's 32nd State Assembly district election, 2006
Party	Candidate	Votes	%
Republican	Jean Fuller	85,055	71.69
Democratic	Maribel Vega	33,594	28.31
Total votes		118,649	100.00
Turnout			56.18
Republican hold			

=== District 33 ===
California's 33rd State Assembly district election, 2006
Party	Candidate	Votes	%
Republican	Sam Blakeslee (incumbent)	91,393	67.01
Democratic	Robert Cuthbert	44,991	32.99
Total votes		136,384	100.00
Turnout			62.01
Republican hold			

=== District 34 ===
California's 34th State Assembly district election, 2006
Party	Candidate	Votes	%
Republican	Bill Maze (incumbent)	56,880	68.33
Democratic	Desmond Farrelly	23,575	28.32
Green	David Silva	2,793	3.36
Total votes		83,248	100.00
Turnout			51.67
Republican hold			

=== District 35 ===
California's 35th State Assembly district election, 2006
Party	Candidate	Votes	%
Democratic	Pedro Nava (incumbent)	77,868	68.32
Republican	Cristina Martin	46,109	31.68
Total votes		123,977	100.00
Turnout			61.46
Democratic hold			

=== District 36 ===
California's 36th State Assembly district election, 2006
Party	Candidate	Votes	%
Republican	Sharon Runner (incumbent)	55,712	61.51
Democratic	Robert Bynum	34,863	38.49
Total votes		90,575	100.00
Turnout			48.12
Republican hold			

=== District 37 ===
California's 37th State Assembly district election, 2006
Party	Candidate	Votes	%
Republican	Audra Strickland (incumbent)	78,493	57.38
Democratic	Ferial Masry	58,305	42.62
Total votes		136,798	100.00
Turnout			57.87
Republican hold			

=== District 38 ===
California's 38th State Assembly district election, 2006
Party	Candidate	Votes	%
Republican	Cameron Smyth	70,193	56.50
Democratic	Lyn Shaw	46,926	37.77
Libertarian	Peggy Christensen	7,116	5.73
Total votes		124,235	100.00
Turnout			55.42
Republican hold			

=== District 39 ===
California's 39th State Assembly district election, 2006
Party	Candidate	Votes	%
Democratic	Richard Alarcón	40,603	100.00
Turnout			47.96
Democratic hold			

=== District 40 ===
California's 40th State Assembly district election, 2006
Party	Candidate	Votes	%
Democratic	Lloyd Levine (incumbent)	50,807	63.40
Republican	Rick Montaine	29,325	36.60
Total votes		80,132	100.00
Turnout			53.42
Democratic hold			

=== District 41 ===
California's 41st State Assembly district election, 2006
Party	Candidate	Votes	%
Democratic	Julia Brownley	78,380	61.74
Republican	Tony Dolz	44,543	35.09
Libertarian	Conrad Frankowski	4,027	3.17
Total votes		126,950	100.00
Turnout			53.72
Democratic hold			

=== District 42 ===
California's 42nd State Assembly district election, 2006
Party	Candidate	Votes	%
Democratic	Michael Feuer	94,619	73.77
Republican	Steven Sion	27,539	21.47
Libertarian	Colin Goldman	6,101	4.76
Total votes		128,259	100.00
Turnout			51.27
Democratic hold			

=== District 43 ===
California's 43rd State Assembly district election, 2006
Party	Candidate	Votes	%
Democratic	Paul Krekorian	55,871	63.12
Republican	Michael Agbaba	26,350	29.77
Libertarian	Steve Myers	6,296	7.11
Total votes		88,517	100.00
Turnout			48.32
Democratic hold			

=== District 44 ===
California's 44th State Assembly district election, 2006
Party	Candidate	Votes	%
Democratic	Anthony Portantino	66,206	58.31
Republican	Scott Carwile	37,699	33.20
Libertarian	Barron Yanaga	4,969	4.38
Green	Ricardo Costa	4,662	4.11
Total votes		113,536	100.00
Turnout			53.03
Democratic hold			

=== District 45 ===
California's 45th State Assembly district election, 2006
Party	Candidate	Votes	%
Democratic	Kevin de León	45,106	83.24
Republican	Samantha Allen-Newman	9,082	16.76
Total votes		54,188	100.00
Turnout			43.97
Democratic hold			

=== District 46 ===
California's 46th State Assembly district election, 2006
Party	Candidate	Votes	%
Democratic	Fabian Núñez (incumbent)	30,518	100.00
Turnout			34.67
Democratic hold			

=== District 47 ===
California's 47th State Assembly district election, 2006
Party	Candidate	Votes	%
Democratic	Karen Bass (incumbent)	84,674	84.87
Republican	Jeffers Dodge	15,096	15.13
Total votes		99,770	100.00
Turnout			48.63
Democratic hold			

=== District 48 ===
California's 48th State Assembly district election, 2006
Party	Candidate	Votes	%
Democratic	Mike Davis	43,310	88.77
Republican	Brenda Green	5,479	11.23
Total votes		48,789	100.00
Turnout			39.24
Democratic hold			

=== District 49 ===
California's 49th State Assembly district election, 2006
Party	Candidate	Votes	%
Democratic	Mike Eng	39,326	63.21
Republican	Esthela Siegrist	18,021	28.97
Libertarian	Laura Brown	4,865	7.82
Total votes		62,212	100.00
Turnout			43.78
Democratic hold			

=== District 50 ===
California's 50th State Assembly district election, 2006
Party	Candidate	Votes	%
Democratic	Hector De La Torre (incumbent)	39,019	77.68
Republican	Gladys Miller	11,210	22.32
Total votes		50,229	100.00
Turnout			42.61
Democratic hold			

=== District 51 ===
California's 51st State Assembly district election, 2006
Party	Candidate	Votes	%
Democratic	Curren Price	52,671	73.94
Republican	Ross Moen	16,241	22.80
Libertarian	Carl Swinney	2,322	3.26
Total votes		71,234	100.00
Turnout			44.72
Democratic hold			

=== District 52 ===
California's 52nd State Assembly district election, 2006
Party	Candidate	Votes	%
Democratic	Mervyn Dymally (incumbent)	37,959	100.00
Turnout			30.15
Democratic hold			

=== District 53 ===
California's 53rd State Assembly district election, 2006
Party	Candidate	Votes	%
Democratic	Ted Lieu (incumbent)	75,491	58.47
Republican	Mary Ford	47,534	36.82
Green	Peter Thottam	3,070	2.38
Peace and Freedom	Karl Abrams	2,997	2.32
Total votes		129,092	100.00
Turnout			53.65
Democratic hold			

=== District 54 ===
California's 54th State Assembly district election, 2006
Party	Candidate	Votes	%
Democratic	Betty Karnette (incumbent)	69,890	60.76
Republican	Michael Jackson	45,128	39.24
Total votes		115,018	100.00
Turnout			51.07
Democratic hold			

=== District 55 ===
California's 55th State Assembly district election, 2006
Party	Candidate	Votes	%
Democratic	Laura Richardson	50,006	68.10
Republican	Margherita Underhill	23,421	31.90
Total votes		83,427	100.00
Turnout			43.14
Democratic hold			

=== District 56 ===
California's 56th State Assembly district election, 2006
Party	Candidate	Votes	%
Democratic	Tony Mendoza	43,666	57.72
Republican	Grace Hu	31,991	42.28
Total votes		75,657	100.00
Turnout			44.42
Democratic hold			

=== District 57 ===
California's 57th State Assembly district election, 2006
Party	Candidate	Votes	%
Democratic	Edward Hernandez	44,025	63.06
Republican	Holly Carver	25,790	36.94
Total votes		69,815	100.00
Turnout			45.01
Democratic hold			

=== District 58 ===
California's 58th State Assembly district election, 2006
Party	Candidate	Votes	%
Democratic	Charles Calderon	53,879	69.39
Republican	Jim Kleinpell	23,766	30.61
Total votes		77,645	100.00
Turnout			46.41
Democratic hold			

=== District 59 ===
California's 59th State Assembly district election, 2006
Party	Candidate	Votes	%
Republican	Anthony Adams	67,499	55.78
Democratic	Elliott Barkan	45,655	37.73
Libertarian	Jill Stone	7,845	6.48
Total votes		120,999	100.00
Turnout			50.82
Republican hold			

=== District 60 ===
California's 60th State Assembly district election, 2006
Party	Candidate	Votes	%
Republican	Bob Huff (incumbent)	74,721	69.96
Democratic	Van Tamom	32,090	30.04
Total votes		106,811	100.00
Turnout			47.54
Republican hold			

=== District 61 ===
California's 61st State Assembly district election, 2006
Party	Candidate	Votes	%
Democratic	Nell Soto	36,482	62.77
Republican	Benjamin Lopez	21,639	37.23
Total votes		58,121	100.00
Turnout			40.92
Democratic hold			

=== District 62 ===
California's 62nd State Assembly district election, 2006
Party	Candidate	Votes	%
Democratic	Wilmer Carter	33,747	68.24
Republican	Marge Mendoza-Ware	15,704	31.76
Total votes		49,451	100.00
Turnout			34.54
Democratic hold			

=== District 63 ===
California's 63rd State Assembly district election, 2006
Party	Candidate	Votes	%
Republican	Bill Emmerson (incumbent)	59,340	59.94
Democratic	Mark Westwood	39,655	40.06
Total votes		98,995	100.00
Turnout			45.16
Republican hold			

=== District 64 ===
California's 64th State Assembly district election, 2006
Party	Candidate	Votes	%
Republican	John Benoit (incumbent)	66,501	61.11
Democratic	Paul Rasso	42,314	38.89
Total votes		108,815	100.00
Turnout			49.76
Republican hold			

=== District 65 ===
California's 65th State Assembly district election, 2006
Party	Candidate	Votes	%
Republican	Paul Cook	67,669	59.92
Democratic	Rita Ramirez-Dean	41,906	37.11
Peace and Freedom	Jon Taleb	3,358	2.97
Total votes		112,933	100.00
Turnout			50.47
Republican hold			

=== District 66 ===
California's 66th State Assembly district election, 2006
Party	Candidate	Votes	%
Republican	Kevin Jeffries	62,582	61.56
Democratic	Laurel Nicholson	39,081	38.44
Total votes		101,663	100.00
Turnout			49.29
Republican hold			

=== District 67 ===
California's 67th State Assembly district election, 2006
Party	Candidate	Votes	%
Republican	Jim Silva	75,001	64.05
Democratic	Ray Roberts	42,103	35.95
Total votes		117,104	100.00
Turnout			46.73
Republican hold			

=== District 68 ===
California's 68th State Assembly district election, 2006
Party	Candidate	Votes	%
Republican	Van Tran (incumbent)	55,155	61.67
Democratic	Paul Lucas	34,277	38.33
Total votes		89,432	100.00
Turnout			43.44
Republican hold			

=== District 69 ===
California's 69th State Assembly district election, 2006
Party	Candidate	Votes	%
Democratic	Jose Solorio	28,339	65.61
Republican	Ryan Williams	14,854	34.39
Total votes		43,193	100.00
Turnout			36.90
Democratic hold			

=== District 70 ===
California's 70th State Assembly district election, 2006
Party	Candidate	Votes	%
Republican	Chuck DeVore (incumbent)	78,724	60.47
Democratic	Michael Glover	51,453	39.53
Total votes		130,177	100.00
Turnout			47.91
Republican hold			

=== District 71 ===
California's 71st State Assembly district election, 2006
Party	Candidate	Votes	%
Republican	Todd Spitzer (incumbent)	83,645	71.63
Democratic	Irene LaChance	33,135	28.37
Total votes		116,780	100.00
Turnout			47.74
Republican hold			

=== District 72 ===
California's 72nd State Assembly district election, 2006
Party	Candidate	Votes	%
Republican	Michael Duvall	55,664	59.14
Democratic	John MacMurray	35,352	37.56
Libertarian	Brian Cross	3,114	3.31
Total votes		94,120	100.00
Turnout			45.47
Republican hold			

=== District 73 ===
California's 73rd State Assembly district election, 2006
Party	Candidate	Votes	%
Republican	Mimi Walters (incumbent)	75,600	73.39
Libertarian	Andrew Favor	27,412	26.61
Total votes		103,012	100.00
Turnout			45.47
Republican hold			

=== District 74 ===
California's 74th State Assembly district election, 2006
Party	Candidate	Votes	%
Republican	Martin Garrick	72,980	58.05
Democratic	Roxana Folescu	52,747	41.95
Total votes		125,727	100.00
Turnout			56.05
Republican hold			

=== District 75 ===
California's 75th State Assembly district election, 2006
Party	Candidate	Votes	%
Republican	George Plescia (incumbent)	77,921	57.87
Democratic	Scott Meyer	52,881	39.27
Libertarian	Edward Teyssier	3,856	2.86
Total votes		134,658	100.00
Turnout			56.23
Republican hold			

=== District 76 ===
California's 76th State Assembly district election, 2006
Party	Candidate	Votes	%
Democratic	Lori Saldaña (incumbent)	73,932	64.40
Republican	Ralph Denney	39,530	34.43
Republican	Kim Tran (write-in)	1,335	1.16
Total votes		114,797	100.00
Turnout			50.22
Democratic hold			

=== District 77 ===
California's 77th State Assembly district election, 2006
Party	Candidate	Votes	%
Republican	Joel Anderson	69,436	60.56
Democratic	Christopher Larkin	41,292	36.02
Libertarian	Rich Belitz	3,921	3.42
Total votes		114,649	100.00
Turnout			52.85
Republican hold			

=== District 78 ===
California's 78th State Assembly district election, 2006
Party	Candidate	Votes	%
Republican	Shirley Horton (incumbent)	51,983	50.89
Democratic	Maxine Sherard	46,846	45.86
Libertarian	Geof Gibson	3,324	3.25
Total votes		102,153	100.00
Turnout			48.03
Republican hold			

=== District 79 ===
California's 79th State Assembly district election, 2006
Party	Candidate	Votes	%
Democratic	Mary Salas	39,437	62.77
Republican	Jean Roesch	23,395	37.23
Total votes		62,832	100.00
Turnout			43.83
Democratic hold			

=== District 80 ===
California's 80th State Assembly district election, 2006
Party	Candidate	Votes	%
Republican	Bonnie Garcia (incumbent)	42,459	51.52
Democratic	Steve Clute	39,946	48.48
Total votes		82,405	100.00
Turnout			47.25
Republican hold			

== See also ==
- California state elections, 2006
- California State Senate elections, 2006
