= Michael D. Duvall =

American politician (born 1955)

Member of the California State Assembly from the 72nd district
- In office December 4, 2006 – September 9, 2009
- Preceded by: Lynn Daucher
- Succeeded by: Chris Norby

Personal details
- Born: June 14, 1955 (age 71) Castro Valley, California, US
- Party: Republican
- Spouse: Susan Duvall
- Children: two
- Profession: Insurance

Michael Dobbins Duvall (born June 14, 1955) is a Republican politician and a former member of the California State Assembly. Duvall was first elected as the Assemblyman for California's 72nd District in 2006 and was re-elected in 2008. During his time in the Assembly, he served as the vice chairman of the Utilities & Commerce Committee. Before his service in the Assembly, he served on the Yorba Linda City Council from 2000 to 2006, was the mayor of Yorba Linda, and owned an insurance agency.

In July 2009, Duvall was caught on a hot mic bragging to a fellow committee member about extramarital sex with two women, one of them a lobbyist. Los Angeles local television first aired the footage on September 8, 2009, and Duvall resigned the next day.

== Personal life and early career ==
Duvall lives in Yorba Linda with his wife, Susan Duvall, and has two adult children. Susan is a local small business owner. While in the Assembly, Duvall would spend most weekdays in Sacramento and fly back to southern California on weekends.

Duvall served on the Yorba Linda City Council from 2000 to 2006 and was elected mayor twice during that period. Chapman University awarded Duvall the Ethics in America Award in 2000 for his "demonstration of the highest standards of ethical integrity" while a member of the Chamber team. He also owned an insurance agency. In January 2005, he was appointed to the Orange County Transportation Authority (OCTA) and served on the Foothill/Eastern Corridor Joint Powers Authority, on the Orange County Sanitation District, as a Director of the Ground Water Replenishment System, and as a Member of the Santa Ana River Flood Protection Agency. Prior to being elected to the City Council, Duvall served as President of the Yorba Linda Chamber of Commerce, as chairman of the Yorba Linda General Plan Steering Committee, and as co-chair of "Safe Streets Are for Everyone." In 2006, Duvall sought to allow Orange County government officials to force the California Department of Transportation to fix broken roads and other problems in the county, which he alleged the department ignored.

== State Assembly ==
Duvall was first elected as the Assemblyman for California's 72nd District in 2006 and was re-elected in 2008. The district includes much of inland Orange County, including the cities of Fullerton and Anaheim. During his time in the Assembly, he served as the vice chairman of the Assembly Transportation Committee, which monitored the operations of the California Department of Transportation, Department of Motor Vehicles, and California Highway Patrol. Later, he was assigned to the Assembly Insurance Committee, the Education Finance Subcommittee, and the Joint Legislative Budget Committee that oversaw the Legislative Analyst's Office. In 2009, Duvall was appointed vice chair of the Utilities and Commerce Committee, which reviews legislation of public utilities.

Legislation Duvall authored included Assembly Bill 2110, which would require people to pass a vessel operator exam or class before getting a license to operate boats or other watercraft. He also authored a bill to allow public schools in the state to spend otherwise categorical funding more flexibly.

=== Political positions ===
The conservative Capitol Resource Institute gave him a 100% rating, calling him "a consistent trooper for the conservative causes" who "voted time and time again to protect and preserve family values in California".

According to a voter guide that the Orange County Register published for the 2006 State Assembly Republican primary for the 72nd district, Duvall supported limiting government expenditures and housing regulations, the latter of which he believed caused higher housing costs. Regarding developments, he believed in balancing preserving and setting aside open space. An opponent of illegal immigration, he supported tougher border security and enforcement of immigration law. In 2008, Duvall supported Proposition 8, which reversed the California Supreme Court decision recognizing same-sex marriage in the state.

=== Extramarital affairs and resignation ===
During a lull in a July 8, 2009, appropriations committee meeting, Duvall had a conversation with fellow Republican committee member and Assemblyman Jeff Miller, wherein he described two different affairs he was currently engaged in with two women, one of them being a lobbyist. Duvall's microphone was "live," and his graphic descriptions, although whispered, were recorded.

The story was first reported on September 8, 2009, by KCAL 9 News, which aired footage of the conversation. The same evening, the OC Weekly published an in-depth piece covering Duvall's affairs, including some of the more graphic parts of the conversation that KCAL was unable to air. One of the sexual relationships raised ethical concerns, as it was with a lobbyist for Sempra Energy, and Duvall was Vice Chairman of the Assembly's Utility and Commerce Committee.

Duvall resigned during the noon hour on September 9, less than 15 hours after the story broke. On November 2, the FBI announced it had conducted an investigation of Duvall's actions and that he would not face federal charges. In response, Sempra Energy reinstated lobbyist Heidi Barsuglia, the woman with whom Duvall allegedly had an affair. Barsuglia released a statement saying: "This experience has been a professional and personal nightmare. I did nothing whatsoever illegal or unethical with former Assemblyman Duvall or anyone else." She stated that she was considering legal action against Duvall.

== Electoral history ==
=== 2006 ===
California's 72nd State Assembly district election, 2006
| Party | Candidate | Votes | % |
|---|---|---|---|
| Republican | Michael D. "Mike" Duvall | 55,664 | 59.2 |
| Democratic | John MacMurray | 35,352 | 37.5 |
| Libertarian | Brian Lee Cross | 3,114 | 3.3 |
| Total votes | | 94,120 | 100.0 |
| Majority | | 20,312 | 21.7 |
| Republican hold | | | |

=== 2008 ===
California's 72nd State Assembly district election, 2008
| Party | Candidate | Votes | % |
|---|---|---|---|
| Republican | Michael Duvall (incumbent) | 79,066 | 54.80 |
| Democratic | John MacMurray | 65,216 | 45.20 |
| Total votes | | 144,282 | 100.00 |
| Turnout | | | 65.01 |
| Republican hold | | | |

California Assembly
| Preceded by Lynn Daucher | State Assemblyman from California's 72nd District; December 4, 2006 – September 9, 2009 | Succeeded by Chris Norby |
