= John Lewis (California politician) =

American politician (born 1954)

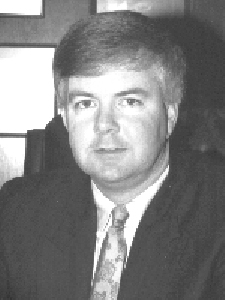

Member of the California Senate from the 33rd district
- In office December 7, 1992 – November 30, 2000
- Preceded by: Cecil Green
- Succeeded by: Dick Ackerman

Member of the California Senate from the 35th district
- In office May 16, 1991 – November 30, 1992
- Preceded by: John Seymour
- Succeeded by: Marian Bergeson

Member of the California State Assembly from the 67th district
- In office December 6, 1982 – May 16, 1991
- Preceded by: Bill Leonard
- Succeeded by: Mickey Conroy

Member of the California State Assembly from the 70th district
- In office December 1, 1980 – November 30, 1982
- Preceded by: Bruce Nestande
- Succeeded by: Marian Bergeson

Personal details
- Born: November 2, 1954 (age 71) Los Angeles, California, US
- Party: Republican
- Spouse: Suzanne Henry
- Children: 2
- Education: University of Southern California

John R. Lewis (born November 2, 1954) is a Republican politician from California who represented Orange County in the California State Senate from 1991 until 2000 and in the California State Assembly from 1980 until 1991. He currently serves as the President of the Lewis Consulting Group.

During his time in the State Senate, Lewis served as the Vice Chairman of the Senate Rules Committee.

Lewis was first elected to the State Senate in 1991 after John Seymour resigned after being appointed to the United States Senate by Governor Pete Wilson. In the Republican primary, Lewis defeated both Assemblymembers Nolan Frizzelle and Doris Allen of Cypress, California who later served briefly as Speaker of the Assembly.

Lewis is an alumnus of University of Southern California.

California Senate
Preceded by Cecil Green	California State Senator, 33rd District; 1992 – 2000	Succeeded by Dick Ackerman
Preceded by John Seymour	California State Senator, 35th District; 1991 – 1992	Succeeded by Marian Bergeson
California Assembly
Preceded by Bill Leonard	California State Assemblymember, 67th District; 1982 – 1991	Succeeded by Mickey Conroy
Preceded by Bruce Nestande	California State Assemblymember, 70th District; 1980 – 1982	Succeeded by Marian Bergeson
