= Travis Allen =

American politician

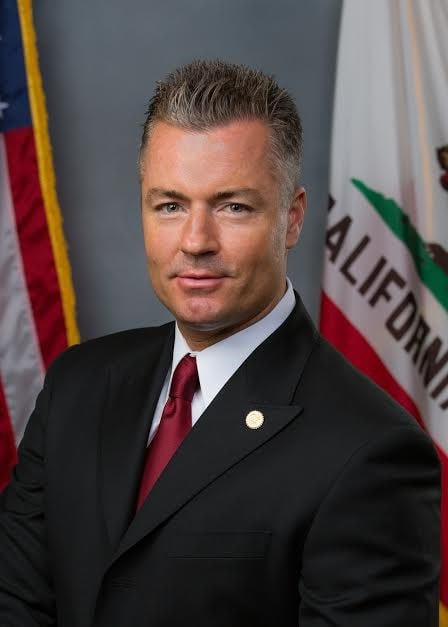

Member of the California State Assembly from the 72nd district
- In office December 3, 2012 – November 30, 2018
- Preceded by: Chris Norby (redistricted)
- Succeeded by: Tyler Diep

Personal details
- Born: September 14, 1973 (age 52) San Diego, California, U.S.
- Party: Republican
- Spouse: Arielle Bailey (m. 2016)
- Children: 2
- Education: California State University, Long Beach (BA)
- Website: jointravisallen.com

Travis Ethan Allen (born September 14, 1973) is an American politician who served as a Republican member of the California State Assembly. Allen was first elected in November 2012 to represent California's 72nd State Assembly district, which includes the cities of Fountain Valley, Los Alamitos, Seal Beach, and Westminster, most of Garden Grove, portions of Huntington Beach and of Santa Ana, and the unincorporated communities of Midway and Rossmoor.

== Early life and education ==
Travis Allen was born in San Diego, California, and was raised in Chula Vista, California. He is an avid short board surfer, and he participated with 65 other people in a world-record setting ride for the most number of riders on a single surf board. He earned a Bachelor of Arts degree in economics from California State University, Long Beach.

== Business career ==
Travis Allen is a Certified Financial Planner and has managed client investment accounts since 1996. He has owned a financial advisory and wealth management practice, the Wealth Strategies Group, since 2001.

== California State Assembly ==
In 2012, Allen began his political career by running for California State Assembly's 72nd district. The seat was open due to term limits. He finished second in the June primary with 19.9% of the vote, trailing establishment Republican frontrunner Los Alamitos City Councilman Troy Edgar, who won 28% of the vote. In the general election Allen surpassed Edgar by an 11.4% margin. Under recently passed Proposition 14 this was the first California election to take place under a nonpartisan blanket primary, in which the top two candidates advanced to the general election, regardless of party preference.

=== Electoral history ===
California's 72nd State Assembly district election, 2012
Primary election
Party	Candidate	Votes	%
Republican	Troy Edgar	18,060	28
Republican	Travis Allen	12,851	19.9
Democratic	Joe Dovinh	12,432	19.3
Republican	Long Pham	12,409	19.2
Democratic	Albert Ayala	8,816	13.7
Total votes		64,568	100.0
General election
Republican	Travis Allen	79,110	55.7
Republican	Troy Edgar	62,983	44.3
Total votes		142,093	100.0
Republican hold			

California's 72nd State Assembly district election, 2014
Primary election
Party	Candidate	Votes	%
Republican	Travis Allen (incumbent)	36,677	65.5
Democratic	Joel Block	11,556	20.6
Democratic	Albert Ayala	7,733	13.8
Total votes		55,966	100.0
General election
Republican	Travis Allen (incumbent)	66,150	65.5
Democratic	Joel Block	34,793	34.5
Total votes		100,943	100.0
Republican hold			

California's 72nd State Assembly district election, 2016
Primary election
Party	Candidate	Votes	%
Republican	Travis Allen (incumbent)	48,321	50.4
Democratic	Lenore Albert-Sheridan	27,466	28.6
Democratic	Nam Pham	20,158	21.0
Total votes		95,945	100.0
General election
Republican	Travis Allen (incumbent)	98,335	58.0
Democratic	Lenore Albert-Sheridan	71,332	42.0
Total votes		169,667	100.0
Republican hold			

== 2018 California gubernatorial election ==
=== Background ===
Allen unsuccessfully ran for Governor of California in the 2018 election. He announced his candidacy in June 2017. Incumbent Jerry Brown was unable to run at the end of his term due to term limits.

Allen came in fourth place in California's open primary where the top two candidates get on the ballot in the November election. He had 440,409 votes, or 9.2% of the overall vote, trailing the leading candidate Democrat Gavin Newsom by over one million votes and trailing Republican rival John Cox by 800,000 votes.

=== Campaign ===
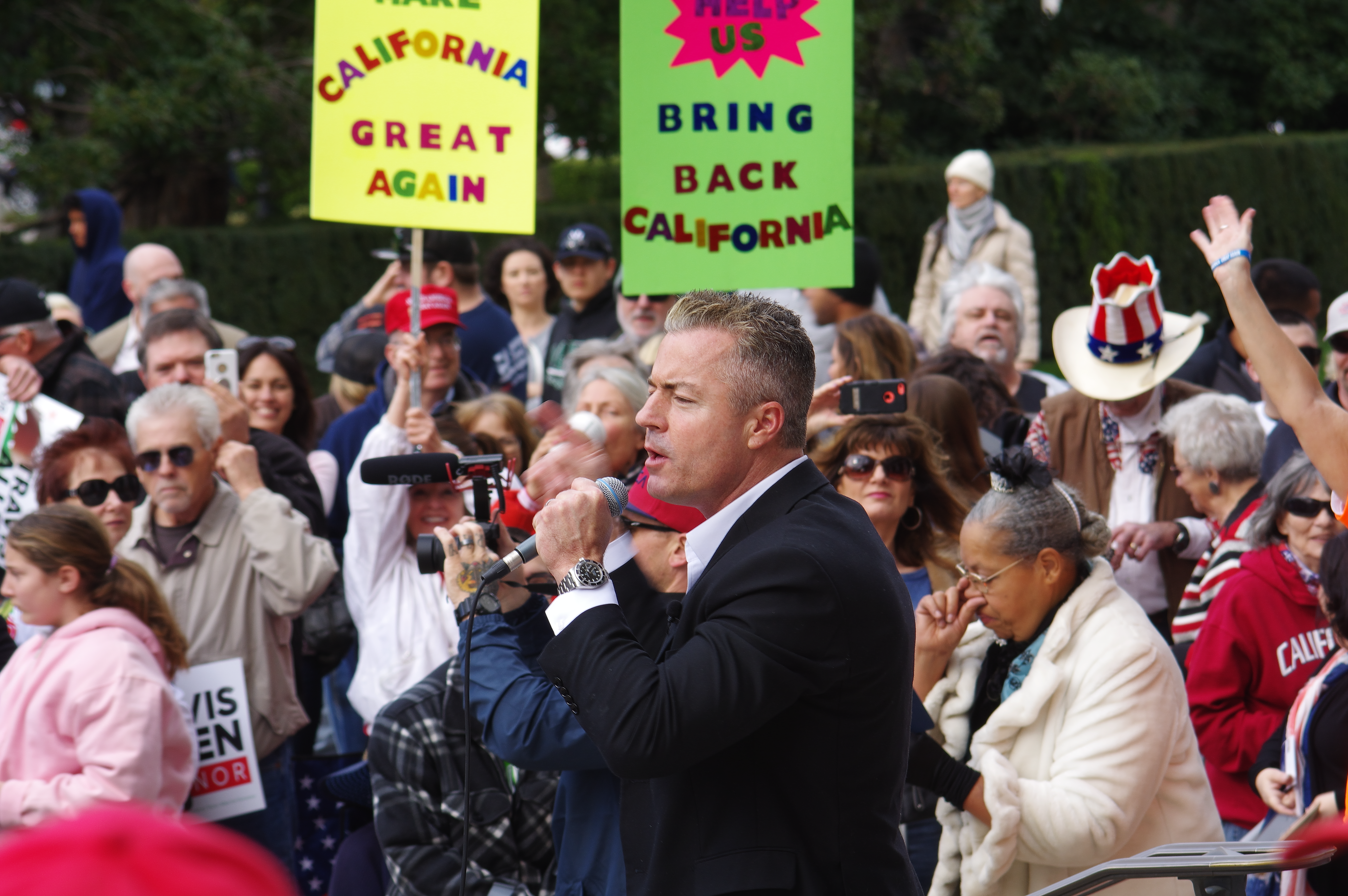
Allen at a February 2018 campaign rally

Allen ran on a campaign based on populist, conservative, anti-establishment themes, much like President Donald Trump used in his 2016 Presidential campaign, and he is considered to be "California's Trump." He has used the slogans "Take Back California" and "Make California Great Again" for his campaign.

Allen is considered by many to be a controversial politician and candidate for California governor due to his far-right populist politics, for being an outspoken proponent of Donald Trump, for a sexual harassment allegation made against Allen by a former coworker (in which he was given a verbal warning but not disciplined for) in 2013, and for making many disputed public statements.

He has stated that he was running on a platform of spurring job creation and business growth by cutting California's high tax rate; using existing tax revenues to fix the state's deteriorating freeway and road infrastructure, opposing California's gas tax, and preventing future water shortages by increasing water storage capacity and completing the landmark California Water Project. He proposed redacting recently implemented laws (AB 109, Proposition 47, and Proposition 57). He states they are responsible for an uptick in violent crime rates in California. However, there has not been an uptick in violent crime, and in fact it has been decreasing. The nonpartisan Public Policy Institute of California found crime to be at a historic low.

Allen used his efforts to repeal the SB 1 gas tax increase and his opposition to illegal immigration as key stances in his campaign. He also supports more "tough-on-crime" policing measures and additional water support for Central California Valley farmers.

On May 1, 2018, Allen spoke at a California Republican primary forum in Atascadero, California. Allen delivered his opening speech, stating that he wants to undo recent voter-enacted soft on crime laws and promised to "get rid of the state-mandated Common Core [educational curriculum]."

During his campaigning for California governor and subsequently, Allen has repeatedly made many disputed statements to the public and media. He has been criticized by pundits and fact-checking sites for these claims. He has made claims on the Oroville Dam regarding water capturing measures he wants to implement if elected, about high crime rates in California, and about the so-called "sanctuary laws" in California. In 2018, Allen made the claim that a new bill in California would "literally" "ban the sale of the Bible", a claim he has repeated despite having been fact-checked by several media outlets. He has also made the claim multiple times that California legalized child prostitution.

While campaigning he made the promise that if he gets elected governor that "every Californian will have a green lawn and take long showers."

Allen was criticized for missing several days of work at the California State Assembly while he was out campaigning.

After losing in the primary elections, Allen didn't immediately endorse his Republican rival John Cox, but eventually decided to do so in July 2018. He also said that he wants his supporters to "stand up and fight" to "take back California". He started the Take Back California Political Action Committee.

=== Campaign funding ===
Midway through his campaign for California Governor, in 2017 Allen raised $447,236 for his campaign and had expenditures of $654,602 during that time according to an official campaign filing. After Allen lost the Primary, his most recent campaign finance records showed $37,539 cash on hand and $17,866 in unpaid bills. In 2018, fundraising efforts and campaign finance reports show his top contributors were "individual donations" and "other donations" (small donations under $200.00), according to Vote Smart.

=== Polling ===
According to RealClear Politics, Travis Allen ranked 4th in the Gubernatorial race for Governor

During his annual Commonwealth Club lecture on May 2, 2018, Willie Brown said Allen's candidacy represented "The greatest threat to the Democratic front runner, Lieutenant Governor Gavin Newsom."

A Berkeley IGS Poll from April 2018 showed Allen and his opponent, Cox, going head to head for 2nd place with the scores of 18% (Cox) and 16% (Allen) within the poll's margin of error of ±4% points.

In May 2018, at the California Republican Party Convention in San Diego, John Cox received 55.3% of the delegates' votes while Allen received 40.5% of the delegates' votes. Neither candidate was able to reach the 60% threshold set by the California Republican Party for an official endorsement. In a Berkeley IGS Poll from December 2017, it showed Allen tied at 9 percent with Republican John Cox.

=== Results ===
Non-partisan blanket primary results
Party	Candidate	Votes	%
Democratic	Gavin Newsom	2,343,792	33.7%
Republican	John H. Cox	1,766,488	25.4%
Democratic	Antonio Villaraigosa	926,394	13.3%
Republican	Travis Allen	658,798	9.5%
Democratic	John Chiang	655,920	9.4%
Democratic	Delaine Eastin	234,869	3.4%
Democratic	Amanda Renteria	93,446	1.3%
Republican	Robert C. Newman II	44,674	0.6%
Democratic	Michael Shellenberger	31,692	0.5%
Republican	Peter Y. Liu	27,336	0.4%
Republican	Yvonne Girard	21,840	0.3%
Peace and Freedom	Gloria La Riva	19,075	0.3%
Democratic	J. Bribiesca	18,586	0.3%
Green	Josh Jones	16,131	0.2%
Libertarian	Zoltan Istvan	14,462	0.2%
Democratic	Albert Caesar Mezzetti	12,026	0.2%
Libertarian	Nickolas Wildstar	11,566	0.2%
Democratic	Robert Davidson Griffis	11,103	0.2%
Democratic	Akinyemi Agbede	9,380	0.1%
Democratic	Thomas Jefferson Cares	8,937	0.1%
Green	Christopher N. Carlson	7,302	0.1%
Democratic	Klement Tinaj	5,368	0.1%
No party preference	Hakan "Hawk" Mikado	5,346	0.1%
No party preference	Johnny Wattenburg	4,973	0.1%
No party preference	Desmond Silveira	4,633	0.1%
No party preference	Shubham Goel	4,020	0.1%
No party preference	Jeffrey Edward Taylor	3,973	0.1%
Green	Veronika Fimbres (write-in)	62	0.0%
No party preference	Arman Soltani (write-in)	32	0.0%
No party preference	Peter Crawford Valentino (write-in)	21	0.0%
Republican	K. Pearce (write-in)	8	0.0%
No party preference	Armando M. Arreola (write-in)	1	0.0%
Total votes		6,862,254	100%

== Later political activities ==
In February 2018, Travis was accused of several sexual harassment allegations during this time as a state assemblyman, a claim which he vehemently denied as being politically motivated, stating “I’m sure I’ve shaken many people’s hands, tapped many people on the shoulder, and have even tapped people’s feet accidentally. But there has never been anything in any of my actions that has been inappropriate, and nor will there ever be.” On November 15, 2018, Allen announced his candidacy for the chairmanship of the California Republican Party. "For too long, the California Republican establishment has told us that we must look more like Democrats in order to be elected in the state of California," Allen said, adding that "This sort of backwards thinking has lost seats and races across the state to where, today, the Republican party is at the lowest point it's been since the 1880s." He lost to Jessica Milan Patterson, who became the state party's first female leader.

== Political positions ==
=== Abortion ===
Allen has described himself as pro-life. He received a 0% score from Planned Parenthood Affiliates of California in 2013, 2015, and 2017.

In 2014 Allen received a 55% score from Planned Parenthood Affiliates of California. On this scorecard he was ranked positively for his support of AB 1755 (which mandated a 15-day limit to notify the Department of Public Health of a breach of patient data), AB 1841 (which expanded the definition of “technical supportive services” who are allowed to handle medication), AB 2051 (which streamlined the Medi-Cal enrollment process), and SB857 (an omnibus health bill). Allen opposed SB 1053 (contraceptives and health care coverage) and SB 1094 (sale of assets in non-profit health care facilities).

In 2016 Allen received a 67% score from Planned Parenthood Affiliates of California. He was scored positively for voting yes on AB 1561, a bill which proposed to "exempt from those taxes the gross receipts from the sale in this state of, and the storage, use, or other consumption in this state of, tampons, sanitary napkins, menstrual sponges, and menstrual cups"; and SB 999, a bill intended to require that health insurance companies "cover up to a 12-month supply of FDA-approved, self-administered hormonal contraceptives".

=== Death penalty ===
"The only major-party candidate to support the death penalty is Assemblyman Travis Allen, R-Huntington Beach (Orange County), who said it was 'absolutely necessary in cases where heinous crimes have been committed.' He said he would deny commutation to any condemned inmate who had been 'rightfully convicted and sentenced'." He is also critical of the high yearly cost associated with preserving the lives of over 700 people who are on death row in California prisons.

=== Education ===
Allen has stated that he opposes mandatory full-day kindergarten, because he believes that children are being indoctrinated by "liberal curriculum". Allen wants to end Common Core's application at the state level, instead allowing local districts to set their own curricula.

=== Environment ===
Allen has called global warming and sea-level rise "unsettled," “absolute nonsense,” and “bogus science". He states, "These policy prescriptions of the Democrats of more regulation and higher taxes that they try to justify with tenuous climate change "science" are not benefiting Californians, nor are they benefiting the environment." Allen has stated that he opposes the California Environmental Quality Act (CEQA) of 1970 because it "strangles new housing development".

In 2017 the California League of Conservation Voters scored Allen at 6% for his voting record on similar bills. His only vote aligned with this organization's goals was for a bill to do with disclosure of ingredients in cleaning products. In the same year, Allen was rated 25% by the California Environmental Justice Alliance, and 25% by the Sierra Club of California.

=== Gas tax ===
Allen sponsored a proposed 2018 ballot initiative to repeal Senate Bill 1, legislation enacted by the Democratic-controlled legislature which increased the state gas tax by 12 cents a gallon and the diesel tax by 20 cents, and “as much as $175 more in annual car registration fees.” Although this initiative did not qualify for the ballot, another initiative to repeal the gas tax increase and to require voter approval of future gas and vehicle taxes did qualify for the ballot as Proposition 6.

According to PolitiFact, some of Allen's statements about the gas tax have been incorrect and problematic, which he disputes. According to Allen, the tax (SB1) allocates money to "transportation-related projects", which he considers to be a vague description of where the funding could be spent and makes the point repeatedly during many of his public appearances. He alleges that the money will be spent on Democratic "budgetary mistakes".

PolitiFact does agree with Allen's point that “the congested corridor program cannot fund general purpose freeway lanes, which are the main lanes used by most drivers,” because “the legislation does, in fact, prohibit spending this money on those.” However, Politifact gave Allen a “mostly false” rating because he “distorted the purpose of the tax,” which is to reduce “vehicle miles traveled, greenhouse gases, and air pollution," and to “reduce people's dependency on their cars.”

=== Guns ===
In 2015, the Firearms Policy Coalition gave Allen an "A" rating in recognition of his support for Second Amendment rights. In 2014 Allen received an "A-" grade score from the NRA Political Victory Fund, followed by a 93% score in 2016. and an A from the Gun Owners of California (a branch of Gun Owners of America). In 2018, the Gun Owners of California again awarded Allen an A.

Allen authored a failed bill which would have changed California into a shall issue CCW state.

=== Healthcare ===
Allen opposed the proposed Medicare expansion and child vaccination policy under SB 277. He has stated opposition to single-payer healthcare noting its high cost and crippling effect on the state budget. Allen's solution includes introducing competition into the California healthcare market, “The solution is to open our markets to companies across the United States to compete for Californians’ business.” He also noted the need to increase the allowances on Health Savings Accounts.

=== Immigration ===
Allen voted no on Senate Bill 54 (2017) when it came to the California State Assembly for a floor vote on September 15, 2017. He has vocally opposed the "Sanctuary State" bill speaking out against it publicly for the first time on February 1, 2017, on the John and Ken show on KFI AM 640. SB 54 passed the Senate and Assembly and was signed into law by Governor Jerry Brown on October 5, 2017, with an effective date of January 1, 2018.

Allen continued his opposition to SB 54 and, as he called it, the "illegal sanctuary state" on January 2, 2018, when he appeared on the Fox News show, Tucker Carlson Tonight where he invited President Donald Trump and United States Attorney General Jeff Sessions to sue Sacramento over the new "Sanctuary State" law. He would appear several more times on Fox News and other networks repeating this invitation throughout 2018.

Allen made this a cornerstone of his failed 2018 campaign for California Governor, vowing "to reverse the illegal sanctuary state in [his] first 100 days in office."

Allen has disputed statements about the details of the bill and about support for it. His assertions regarding public support for the sanctuary state are based on various polls, Polls come from different focus groups, conservative vs. liberal although this has been a point of debate as well.

=== Israel ===
In 2016, Allen introduced legislation in opposition to the Boycott, Divestment and Sanctions (BDS) campaign - AB 1552: a bill that would prohibit state government entities from doing business with companies that officially join the BDS campaign, and AB 1551, another bill that would forbid state government entities from investing in companies engaged in political actions to damage or limit commerce with Israel and Israeli companies. Allen's AB 1552 was eventually signed into law as AB 2844, of which Allen was principal author.

=== Taxes ===
In the State Assembly, Allen earned 100% ratings from the California Taxpayers Association, the National Federation of Independent Business and the California Manufacturers and Technology Association. Allen's support for lower taxes and opposition to tax increases earned him A+ ratings from the Howard Jarvis Taxpayers Association.

=== Voter ID laws ===
Allen is a supporter of Voter ID laws in the United States, specifically in California, and has made this a part of his platform for his race for governor in California.

He has stated publicly and via his social media accounts, that there is voter fraud in California. His "controversial" statement was, “Eleven counties in California have more total registered voters than citizens over the age of 18. How is this possible?” In the opinion of some newspaper editorialists, a statement which never had any evidence for and which has been proven incorrect. He "made up" inaccurate numbers for the number of registered voters in California, according to newspaper opinion writer, Dan Morain.

In August 2017, Judicial Watch on behalf of the Election Integrity Project(Election Integrity Project California, Inc.) sent a notice-of-violation letter to the state of California alleging that public records obtained on the Election Assistance Commission's 2016 Election Administration Voting Survey and through verbal accounts from various county agencies show eleven California counties - Imperial (102%), Lassen (102%), Los Angeles (112%), Monterey (104%), San Diego (138%), San Francisco (114%), San Mateo (111%), Santa Cruz (109%), Solano (111%), Stanislaus (102%), and Yolo (110%) - have more registered voters than voting-age citizens; and that Los Angeles County officials “informed us that the total number of registered voters now stands at a number that is a whopping 144% of the total number of resident citizens of voting age.” In December 2017 Judicial Watch filed a federal lawsuit against Los Angeles County and the State of California over their alleged failure to clean their voter rolls and to produce election-related records as required by the federal National Voter Registration Act (NVRA)(The United States Department of Justice).

== Personal life ==
Allen is divorced and single.
