= Lynn Daucher =

American politician from California

Member of the California State Assembly from the 72nd district
- In office December 4, 2000 – November 30, 2006
- Preceded by: Dick Ackerman
- Succeeded by: Michael D. Duvall

Personal details
- Born: September 20, 1946 (age 79) Washington, D.C., U.S.
- Party: Republican
- Spouse: Don
- Children: 4
- Education: University of Rochester
- Occupation: Teacher, politician

Lynn Daucher (born September 20, 1946) is a United States politician who was a Republican California State Assemblywoman from Orange County from 2000 until 2006 when she was term limited. That year, Daucher ran for the California State Senate seat being vacated by Joseph Dunn, but lost to Orange County Supervisor and former Assemblyman Lou Correa by 1,392 votes (a 1% margin). Daucher formerly served as the director of the California Department of Aging.

== Early life ==
On September 20, 1946, Daucher was born in Washington, D.C.

== Education ==
In 1968, Daucher earned a Bachelor's Degree in Education with a minor in mathematics from the University of Rochester in Rochester, New York.

== Career ==
In 1968, Daucher became a teacher.

In 1981, Daucher served on the School Board for Brea Olinda Unified School District, until 1994.

In 1994, Daucher was elected to the Brea City Council, until 2000. In 2001, Daucher served as a member of California State Assembly, until 2006. Daucher served as a mayor of Brea, California.

In 2007, Daucher was appointed as the director of California Department of Aging by Governor Arnold Schwarzenegger.

== Awards ==
- 2007 Lifetime Achievement Award. Presented by California State University. March 19, 2007.

== Personal life ==
Daucher's husband is Don. They have four children. Daucher is a resident of Brea, California for the past thirty-six years.
