= Phil Dynan =

American novelist

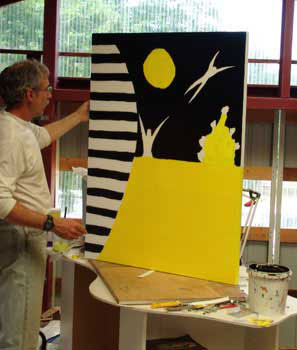
- Artist Phil Dynan
- Born: August 11, 1948 (age 78); Kansas City, Missouri, U.S.
- Known for: Painting, writing, serigraphy

Phil Dynan (born August 11, 1948) is an artist and author living in California. His images have been published and distributed around the world. Much of his work has featured cycling and running art. Dynan is a painter and serigrapher as well as a graphic designer. His work has been used for a variety of events, including the Tour de France, the Tour Feminin, the World Cycling Championships, the Coors Classic "Sacramento Twilight Criterium", the San Diego Marathon, California International Marathon, the Lake Tahoe Marathon, and the San Francisco Marathon.

== Biography ==
Phil Dynan was born in Kansas City, Missouri to parents Philip A. Dynan and Rosanell Cheatham. Both parents were employees of Hallmark Cards. Dynan's father was a platemaker in the photographic lab and his mother was an artist and card designer. Eventually, the Dynan family moved to Wilmington, Delaware; St. Louis, Missouri; Regina, Saskatchewan; Stockton, California, Montgomery, West Virginia; Lawrence, Kansas; and Macomb, Illinois. Dynan joined the US Army Security Agency in 1966 and served at Kagnew Station in Asmara, Ethiopia.

After leaving the military, Dynan worked selling art on the streets of London, then returned to the US to attend Western Illinois University, where he received a B.A. in English and Political Science in 1973. His first art exhibit was held at the University Students Union in 1972. Inspired by commercial success, he went on to design stationery and cards for the University. After graduation, he spent more time painting and by 1978, launched Starbound Productions a California greeting card company that featured his work.

The widespread distribution of his images gained him an international following. His work was published in Japan by The Graphic Factory, in France by the White Press, in the UK by Rainbow Bridge, and in the Netherlands by Verkerke Reprodukties*

He was originally represented by the Michael Himovitz Gallery in Carmichael, California. A series of nudes and flowers done for an exhibit at the Himovitz resulted in his work, "Martine", being selected for the 1984 Print Magazine Regional Design Annual.

During the 1980s he began designing running art for major marathons. His first image was used by the California International Marathon in 1988. IMG (International Image Group) hired Dynan in 1993 to produce fine art images reproduced as serigraphs for their San Francisco Marathon. Dynan worked with IMG up til the end of the Century, when the San Francisco Marathon was sold to another company. During the 90's and currently, Dynan still produces Marathon art for races such as the Redding Marathon, the Russian River Marathon, the Whiskeytown (CA) Relay, and the Rocklin (CA) Run. His work is also licensed to various other groups and race events.

Currently, Dynan paints from his studio in Northern California. His work is primarily plein-air painting with acrylics or oils.

== Personal life ==
Dynan is a runner specializing in marathons. He once started a transcontinental run from New York and ran 1000 miles before "personal business interrupted the journey".

== Artists books ==
- Enneagram Animals (1994 ISBN 1-893646-01-7)
- Moto & Kozo Visit the Museum of Modern Art (1996 ISBN 1-893646-00-9)
- Moto y Kozo Visitan el Museo de Arte Moderno (1996 ISBN 1-893646-06-8)
- All You Need is Love (1996 ISBN 1-893646-03-3)
- The Legend of Birdtoe (1997 ISBN 1-893646-02-5)
- Phone Box Tarts Meet Lonely Hearts (2003 ISBN 1-893646-07-6)

== Novels ==
In 2006 Phil Dynan wrote and published a novel entitled "Brother Eagle, Sister Moon"(ISBN 1-893646-08-4) about an Iraq family and an American helicopter pilot. The book, although fictionalized, was based on real life characters and at book signings the author was accompanied by the main character, who had just returned from Iraq. The US State Department became interested in the book, and extended a Fulbright Cultural Exchange Program invitation to the author. Dynan was to go to Baghdad in 2007, but the visit was cancelled because of security concerns in the Green Zone.

== Performance art ==
Phil Dynan has written several plays and acted in the public performances. In 1987 he gave his first performance of "My Life as an Artist" at the Auburn Public Library He helped write and performed in a second play, "Betty Banal's Chat Room". The play was used to open an exhibit in Napa, California. Dynan wrote and acted in a play entitled "All Things Connected: My Last Thoughts on Earth" at Moxie's in Chico, California. The play was a tribute to the people who died in the July 7 London Terrorist Bombings.

Dynan also ran for California State Assembly in 2006 as a piece of "performance art". A member of San Francisco "Butterfly Artists Collective", Dynan gave reports to the group as his "campaign" progressed. He won an elected office as "County Chair of the Peace and Freedom Party" and lost the general election for State Assembly.
