= Hobart R. Alter =

American politician

Member of the California State Assembly from the 72nd district
- In office January 2, 1933 - January 7, 1935
- Preceded by: Ben A. Hill
- Succeeded by: Godfrey A. Andreas

Personal details
- Born: December 13, 1897 Iowa, US
- Died: May 13, 1984 (aged 86) Ontario, California, US
- Party: Republican
- Spouse: Katherine G. Laidlaw (m. 1919)
- Children: 3

Military service
- Branch/service: United States Army
- Battles/wars: World War I

Hobart Romig Alter (December 13, 1897 – May 13, 1984) was an American citrus grower and politician who served in the California State Assembly for the 72nd district from 1933 to 1935. During World War I, he served in the United States Army.

Alter was born in Washington County, Iowa, the son of E. R. Alter and Mabel Meacham. He died in Orange County, California, in 1984.
