= Robert Dutton (politician) =

American politician (1950–2022)

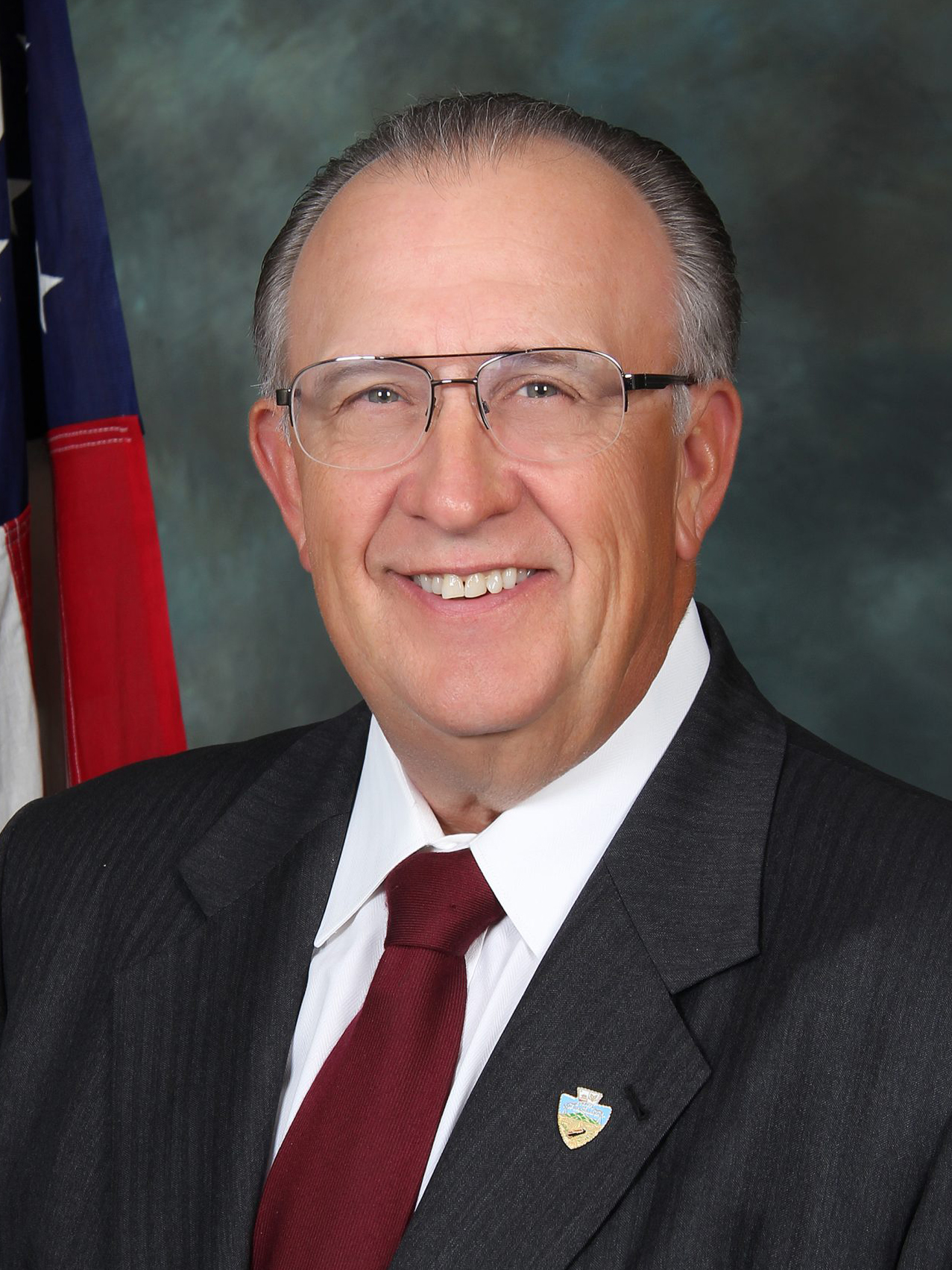

Member of the California Senate from the 31st district
- In office December 6, 2004 – November 30, 2012
- Preceded by: Jim Brulte
- Succeeded by: Richard Roth

Member of the California State Assembly from the 63rd district
- In office December 2, 2002 – November 30, 2004
- Preceded by: Bill Leonard
- Succeeded by: Bill Emmerson

Minority Leader of the California Senate
- In office October 11, 2010 – January 5, 2012
- Preceded by: Dennis Hollingsworth
- Succeeded by: Bob Huff

Personal details
- Born: Robert Dale Dutton; October 13, 1950 Lincoln, Nebraska, U.S.
- Died: July 23, 2022 (aged 71)
- Party: Republican
- Spouse: Andrea Guillen (m. 1981)
- Children: 1
- Education: Los Angeles Valley College
- Occupation: Businessman

Military service
- Branch/service: United States Army Reserves; California Air National Guard
- Years of service: 1969–1974
- Rank: Sergeant

Robert Dale Dutton (October 13, 1950 – July 23, 2022) was an American politician of the Republican Party. After serving two years as a State Assemblyman for the 63rd district, from 2002 to 2004, Dutton served as a State Senator representing the 31st district from 2004 to 2012, and was the state senate's minority leader from 2010 to 2012. He made an unsuccessful run for the U.S. House of Representatives in 2012. In 2014, he was elected as Assessor-Recorder-County Clerk of San Bernardino County and re-elected in 2018, holding the position until his death.

== Early life, education, and early career ==
Dutton was born in Lincoln, Nebraska in 1950. In 1972, he received an A.A. in real estate from Los Angeles Valley College. In 1976, he became President of the local Kiwanis.

He served in the Army Reserve in 1969 and then went on to serve on the California Air National Guard. Dutton owned the real estate company Dutton & Associates, Inc. He was also involved with the YMCA and the Red Cross.

He began his public service as a City Councilman for Rancho Cucamonga, California.

== California legislature ==
=== Elections ===
After redistricting, incumbent Republican state assemblyman Bill Leonard decided to retire in order to run for a seat on the California Board of Equalization. Dutton decided to run in the vacant California's 63rd State Assembly district and won the Republican primary with 45% of the vote in a three candidate field. He won the general election by defeating Democratic nominee Donna Wallace 61%–39%.

In 2004, he decided to retire from his seat in the 63rd Assembly district in order to run for California's 31st State Senate district, vacated by retiring Republican state senator Jim Brulte. He defeated Democratic nominee Marjorie Mikels 60%–40%. In 2008, he won re-election to a second term with 59% of the vote.

=== Committee assignments ===
2011–2012

- Emergency Management Committee
- Labor and Industrial Relations Committee
- Audit Committee
- Rules Committee

2009–2010

- Budget and Fiscal Review Committee (Vice Chair)
- Transportation and Housing Committee
- Rules Committee
- Joint Legislative Budget Committee

== 2012 congressional election ==
In January 2012, Dutton decided to retire from the California Senate to run in the newly redrawn California's 31st Congressional District, based in San Bernardino County, and vacated by retiring U.S. Congressman Jerry Lewis. Dutton lost the general election to fellow Republican Gary Miller by a 55% to 45% margin.

== Assessor-Recorder of San Bernardino County ==
In September 2013, Dutton announced his candidacy for the San Bernardino County Assessor-Recorder, vacated by retiring County Assessor-Recorder Dennis Draeger. Dutton won the June 3, 2014 California Primary Election to Dan Harp, receiving over 50% of the vote and avoiding a November run-off election.

As a division of the Assessor-Recorder-County Clerk responsibilities, Dutton was the keeper of the historical archives.

In 2018, Dutton was re-elected unopposed. Just weeks before his death in 2022, he was again re-elected unopposed.

=== Committee assignments ===
2014–2022

- California Assessor's Association – Legislative Committee
- County Recorder's Association of California

== Personal life ==
He married Andrea Guillen in 1981, and they had one daughter. Dutton died from cancer on July 23, 2022, at the age of 71.

California Assembly
| Preceded by Bill Leonard | California State Assemblyman; 63rd District; December 2, 2002 – November 30, 2004 | Succeeded by Bill Emmerson |
California Senate
| Preceded by Jim Brulte | California State Senator; 31st District; December 6, 2004 – November 30, 2012 | Succeeded by Richard Roth |
Party political offices
| Preceded by Dennis Hollingsworth | California State Senate Republican Leader; October 11, 2010 – January 5, 2012 | Succeeded by Bob Huff |
