= Chris Norby =

American politician (born 1949)

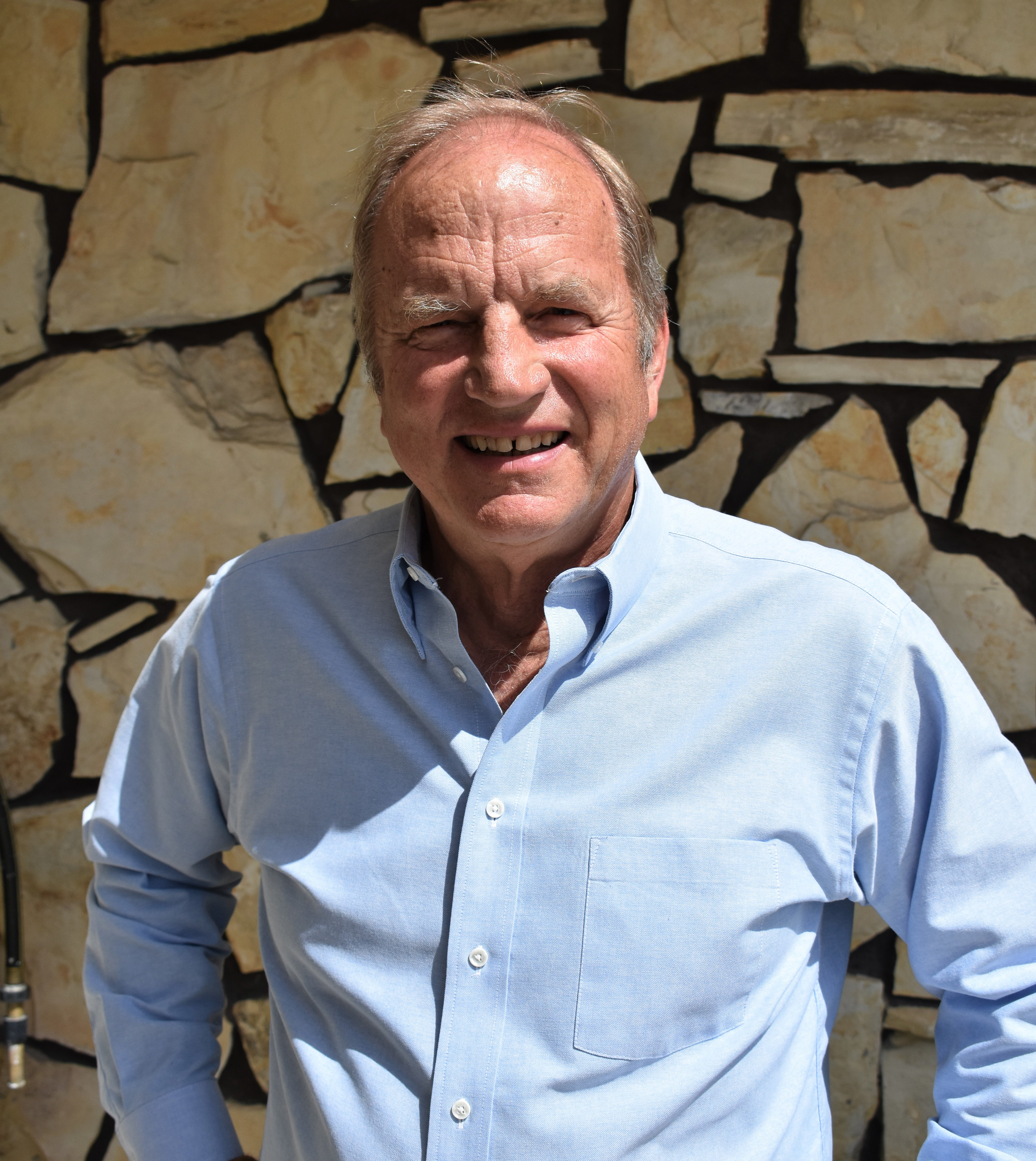

Member of the California State Assembly from the 72nd district
- In office January 29, 2010 – November 30, 2012
- Preceded by: Michael D. Duvall
- Succeeded by: Travis Allen

Chair of the Orange County Board of Supervisors
- In office January 4, 2006 – January 9, 2007
- Preceded by: Thomas W. Wilson
- Succeeded by: John Moorlach

Vice Chair of the Orange County Board of Supervisors
- In office January 9, 2007 – January 8, 2008
- Preceded by: Thomas W. Wilson
- Succeeded by: John Moorlach

Member of the Orange County Board of Supervisors from the 4th District
- In office January 7, 2003 – January 29, 2010
- Preceded by: Cynthia Coad
- Succeeded by: Shawn Nelson

Mayor of Fullerton, California
- In office December 1995 – December 1997
- Preceded by: Julie Sa
- Succeeded by: Don Bankhead
- In office December 1990 – December 1991
- Preceded by: A. B. "Buck" Catlin
- Succeeded by: Don Bankhead

Personal details
- Born: December 3, 1949 (age 76) Fullerton, California, U.S.
- Party: Republican
- Spouse(s): Charitini; Charlotte; Marsha (m. 2006, div. 2008); Martha Phillips (m. 2009)
- Children: 5
- Education: Occidental College (BA); California State University, Fullerton (MA)
- Profession: History Teacher
- Website: www.assembly.ca.gov/norby

Chris Norby (born December 3, 1949) is an American politician and educator. He served on the Fullerton City Council (1984–2002) including three years as mayor, on the Orange County Board of Supervisors (2003–2010), on the California State Assembly (2010–2012).

== Early life and education ==
A native of Fullerton, California, Chris Norby was one of four children born to Cornell and June Norby.

During his youth, Chris Norby played Little League baseball, Pop Warner football, and sang in the First Presbyterian Church children's choir. He was also a Boy Scout and worked in the Norby family's lumber yard. As a teenager, Norby volunteered for Barry Goldwater's presidential campaign and worked as a guide at the Haunted Shack at the Knott's Berry Farm amusement park.

Attending Fullerton Union High School, he played on the football and track teams and was elected Student Body President. He wrote for both the school newspaper and the Fullerton News Tribune. Norby volunteered for the Barry Goldwater 1964 presidential campaign and Eugene McCarthy 1968 presidential campaign

He enrolled at Occidental College in Los Angeles, where he graduated with a Bachelor of Arts in religious studies in 1972. He was co-chair of Occidental's first Earth Day in 1970, elected to the Board of Governors (1970–71) co-founded the Omega Tau Rho fraternity and was active as a Yell Leader (1970–72). He later earned a teaching credential and master's degree in history at California State University, Fullerton.

== Career ==
During most of 1973, Norby traveled around the world, visiting 24 countries, mostly by hitch-hiking and taking local buses and trains. He wrote about his experiences in his book called “The Hippy Trail."

=== Teaching career ===
Norby taught secondary students in both Catholic and public schools for 25 years, including St. Joseph School in Placentia, Alverno High School in Sierra Madre, Arcadia High School and 18 years at Brea-Olinda High School in Brea, At Brea-Olinda, he served as Pep Squad Advisor, Assistant Wrestling Coach, and advisor to the Swing Dance and Young Republicans Clubs. Students voted Norby “Mr. Brea Teacher-of-the-Year” in 1998.

=== Fullerton city council ===
In April 1984, Norby was elected to the Fullerton City Council and was re-elected in 1988, 1992, 1996, and 2000, serving 18 years until his election to the Orange County Board of Supervisors in 2002.

Norby was awarded the 1997 Samuel Adams Award for Leadership in Local Government from the Local Government Council, a nonprofit organization that seeks to promote free market policies.

=== County supervisor ===
In March 2002, Norby became the first person in 22 years to defeat an incumbent Orange County Supervisor when he won 54% of the vote in the Fourth Supervisoral District, representing Fullerton, Placentia, La Habra, Buena Park, and West Anaheim. The Los Angeles Times described it as "one of the biggest upsets in the county's political history." Norby was re-elected in 2006 and elected chairman of the Board of Supervisors in 2007.

While Supervisor, Norby helped end the county's futile efforts at converting El Toro Marine base into an unneeded commercial airport and pushed for reforms of public pensions and public contracting. In response to the U.S. Supreme Court decision Kelo v. City of New London expanding government's power to seize private property, Norby authored Measure A, which strengthened the rights of homeowners and other private property owners by prohibiting Orange County government from seizing private property to give to a different private owner. The Board of Supervisors voted unanimously to put Measure A on the ballot, which voters approved by a 76%–24% margin. Norby also proposed and gained passage of a county ordinance issuing medical marijuana identification cards to eligible patients to show to police officers when questioned about marijuana possession.

Norby served on the Orange County Transportation Authority as chairman, Eastern/Foothill Toll Road Authority, OC Sanitation District, OC Fire Authority Board and represented Orange County on the Southern California Association of Governments (SCAG) where he served as co-chair of the Committee on Local Government Fiscal Reform.

== California State Assembly ==
Norby won a special election to represent the 72nd State Assembly District in 2009, following the resignation of Michael D. Duvall, and was re-elected to a full term in 2010, representing Fullerton, Brea, La Habra and parts of Orange, Yorba Linda and Anaheim. In 2012, Norby was redistricted into the 65th State Assembly District, where he narrowly lost the 2012 election, being outspent 3-1 by public employee unions.

While in the legislature, Norby worked for bipartisan reforms in criminal justice reform, particularly for non-violent drug offenders. He introduced bills to curb asset forfeiture abuse. He worked directly with Governors Arnold Schwarzenegger and Jerry Brown for the reform and ultimate dissolution of state redevelopment agencies, ending decades of fiscal and eminent domain abuses.

=== Fighting redevelopment agencies ===
As a Fullerton City Councilman, Norby had "gained a name statewide as a fierce critic of redevelopment projects." In 1996, while Mayor of Fullerton, he founded Municipal Officials for Redevelopment Reform (MORR), a statewide coalition dedicated to fighting redevelopment agencies' provision of taxpayer subsidies to private development and eminent domain abuse.

Norby also wrote Redevelopment: The Unknown Government, a book describing the distortions caused by the fiscalization of land use, eminent domain abuse, and sales tax competition that results in big-box stores, car dealerships, and sports teams receiving huge public subsidies.

During his time as an Orange County Supervisor, Norby continued his fight against redevelopment agencies, sponsoring conferences to share information on how to combat redevelopment agencies, testifying against efforts to extend redevelopment project deadlines beyond 40 years, creating and gaining passage of Measure A to prevent eminent domain from being used to seize private property to give to another private party.

As a California state Assemblyman, Norby continued his fight against redevelopment agencies, citing it as one of his top legislative priorities. He argued against redevelopment agencies in media-sponsored debates, spoke at community meetings across the state, and published articles in various state publications calling for redevelopment money to be spent on education instead.

Norby introduced legislation in the Assembly to prohibit redevelopment agencies from using tax revenue to subsidize professional sports teams or their stadiums. He also introduced legislation to force redevelopment agencies to be subject the Local Agency Formation Commission process, as other local agencies were required to be.

Norby crossed party lines to partner with Governor Jerry Brown, a Democrat, in an eventually successful effort to abolish redevelopment agencies. When redevelopment agencies filed a lawsuit to overturn California's new law abolishing the agencies, Norby filed an amicus curiae brief with the Supreme Court of California in defense of the new law.

== Personal life ==
Norby currently works as a land-use consultant for several housing developers and helped successfully develop digital signs along the 91 Freeway with the City of La Palma. He is active in Buena Park Rotary Club, Sons of Norway, Fullerton Elks Lodge and YMCA. He serves on the Fullerton High School's English Learners Advisory Committee (ELAC) and Chairs the District English Learners Advisory Committee (DELAC) for the Fullerton Joint Union High School District.

Norby resides in Fullerton and is the father of five children, Ana, Iris, Gary, Alex and Johnny. Norby is the head usher at his family's church, the First Presbyterian Church of Fullerton.
