= Dick Ackerman =

American politician (born 1942)

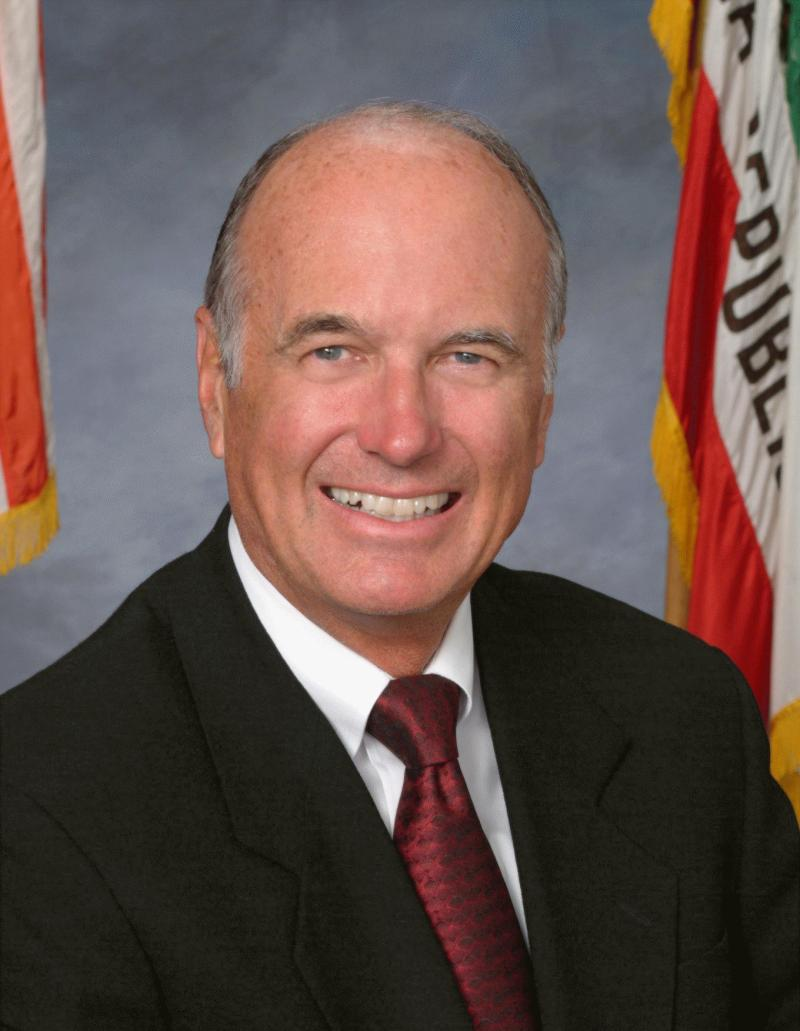

Minority Leader of the California Senate
- In office May 10, 2004 – April 15, 2008
- Preceded by: Jim Brulte
- Succeeded by: Dave Cogdill

Member of the California Senate from the 33rd district
- In office December 4, 2000 – November 30, 2008
- Preceded by: John Lewis
- Succeeded by: Mimi Walters

Member of the California State Assembly from the 72nd district
- In office September 13, 1995 – November 30, 2000
- Preceded by: Ross Johnson
- Succeeded by: Lynn Daucher

Personal details
- Born: December 5, 1942 (age 83) Long Beach, California, U.S.
- Party: Republican
- Spouse: Linda Ackerman
- Children: 3
- Education: University of California, Berkeley (BA); University of California, Hastings (JD)
- Profession: Attorney

Richard Charles Ackerman (born December 5, 1942) is an American Republican politician, who was a California State Senator for the 33rd District, representing inland Orange County, from 2000 to 2008.

Born in Long Beach, California, Ackerman earned a B.A. in Mathematics from the University of California, Berkeley in 1964 and a J.D. from Hastings College of the Law in 1967. Ackerman and his wife, Linda, who married in 1968, have three children, Lauren, Marc, and Brett, and four grandchildren, Caitlin, Elizabeth, Robert & Delaney.

Elected to the Fullerton City Council in 1980, Ackerman served three terms on the council, also serving as Mayor in 1982 and 1986.

== California State Assembly career ==
Ackerman was elected to the California State Assembly from the 72nd District in a 1995 special election to replace Assemblyman Ross Johnson, who vacated the seat after winning a special election to the State Senate. He was unopposed for re-election in 1996 and won 68% of the vote in 1998. During his tenure in the Assembly, Ackerman served as Assistant Republican Leader, Republican Caucus Whip, Vice Chair of the Assembly Natural Resources Committee, Vice Chair of the Assembly Judiciary Committee, a member of Appropriations Committee, and a member of the Legislative Ethics Committee.

== California State Senate career ==
After those three terms in the Assembly, Ackerman was elected to the State Senate in 2000. In first year in the Senate, he became Vice Chair of the Senate Budget and Fiscal Review Committee. Ackerman and his family moved from their long-time Fullerton residence in the northern part of his Senate District to Irvine in the central part of his Senate District. In 2002, Ackerman agreed to run as a sacrificial lamb against incumbent Democratic Attorney General Bill Lockyer in the latter's bid for a second term, as no Republican sought the nomination for Attorney General and Ackerman could retain his Senate seat since it was not up for election until 2004. As expected, Lockyer won re-election and Ackerman stayed in the Senate. On May 10, 2004, Ackerman was unanimously elected to serve as Senate Minority Leader. Six months later, he won re-election to the Senate with 69% of the vote. On April 15, 2008, Ackerman officially handed over California Senate GOP leadership to fellow Long Beach-born State Senator Dave Cogdill.

California Assembly
| Preceded by Ross Johnson | California State Assemblymember; 72nd District; September 13, 1995 – November 30, 2000 | Succeeded by Lynn Daucher |
California Senate
| Preceded by John Lewis | California State Senator; 33rd District; December 4, 2000 – November 30, 2008 | Succeeded by Mimi Walters |
Party political offices
| Preceded by Jim Brulte | California State Senate Republican Leader; May 10, 2004 – April 15, 2008 | Succeeded by Dave Cogdill |
