= Frederic Price (cricketer, born 1840) =

English cricketer

Frederic Richard Price (2 February 1840 – 26 December 1894) was a Welsh first-class cricketer. He was a right-handed batsman and an underarm slow bowler who played occasionally from 1859 to 1872, sometimes as a wicketkeeper.

Price was born in February 1840 at Llewes Hall, Denbighshire, Wales. In his Death notice in The Times, Price was cited as the youngest son of John Price of Llanrhaeadr Hall, Denbigh. He was educated at Cheltenham College and The Queen's College, Oxford. He represented Oxford University Cricket Club, Gloucestershire County Cricket Club and the Gentlemen of the North.

Price made six first-class appearances, scoring 90 runs at 11.25 with a highest innings of 33. He held eight catches and completed three stumpings. His only bowling was in 1859 for the Gentlemen of the North when he took 6 wickets at 16.50 with a best analysis of 3–33.

Below first-class level he played at county level for Cheshire, Monmouthshire, Denbighshire, and, between 1867 and 1872, for Shropshire. For the latter, he appeared in three matches, scoring at most 46 runs in a match, and took a total 11 wickets.

Price died at sea in the English Channel on 26 December 1894 aged 54. He was on board the SS Teutonic sailing from America to England.
