= Cecil Green (politician) =

American businessman and politician

Member of the California State Senate from the 33rd district
- In office May 13, 1987 – November 30, 1992
- Preceded by: Paul B. Carpenter
- Succeeded by: John Lewis

Personal details
- Born: October 13, 1924 Riverside, California
- Died: December 3, 1994 (aged 70) Lakeport, California
- Party: Democratic
- Spouse: Mary Green (m. 1961)
- Children: 1

Military service
- Branch/service: United States Navy

Cecil Green (September 13, 1924 in Riverside, California - December 3, 1994 in Lakeport, California) was an American politician from California and a member of the Democratic Party.

Green started his public service in 1971 when was appointed to the Norwalk planning commission. In 1974 he was elected to Norwalk city council and was reelected in 1978, 1982 and 1986.

In 1987, Green ran in a special election for the California State Senate seat left open after incumbent Paul B. Carpenter (D-Cerritos) resigned to join the California State Board of Equalization. In an upset, he defeated assemblyman Wayne Grisham (R-La Mirada) by more than 9 points, a wider than expected margin. In fact, Grisham's loss was such that Democrats saw it as a sign of weakness and went on to oust him from his assembly seat the following year.

In 1988 Green faced a tough reelection for a full term against Republican Cerritos city councilman Don Knabe (who had originally planned to run in the special election but deferred to Grisham). After an expensive battle, Green defeated Knabe by just over 1%.

Green did not seek reelection in 1992 and retired from elective office. He died December 3, 1994, at the age of 70.

== Electoral history ==
Member, California State Senate: 1987–1992
| Year | Office | Democrat | Votes | Pct | Republican | Votes | Pct |
|---|---|---|---|---|---|---|---|
| 1987 | California State Senate; District 33 | Cecil Green | 46,299 | 54.1% | Wayne Grisham | 38,116 | 44.5% |
| 1988 | California State Senate; District 33 | Cecil Green | 104,606 | 50.8% | Don Knabe | 101,181 | 49.2% |

Political offices
| Preceded by Paul B. Carpenter | California State Senate 33rd District; May 12, 1987 – November 30, 1992 | Succeeded by John Lewis |
