= R. Fred Price =

American politician

Member of the California State Assembly from the 72nd district
- In office January 4, 1943 - January 8, 1951
- Preceded by: Godfrey A. Andreas
- Succeeded by: Stanford C. Shaw

Personal details
- Born: August 6, 1890 Pingree, North Dakota, US
- Died: July 18, 1956 (aged 65) San Bernardino, California, US
- Party: Republican
- Spouse: Clara Bernhard

Military service
- Branch/service: United States Army
- Battles/wars: World War I

Robert Frederick Price (August 6, 1890 - July 18, 1956) served in the California State Assembly for the 72nd district from 1943 to 1951 and during World War I he served in the United States Army.
