= 2012 California State Senate election =

- November 6, 2012

20 seats from odd-numbered districts in the California State Senate 21 seats needed for a majority
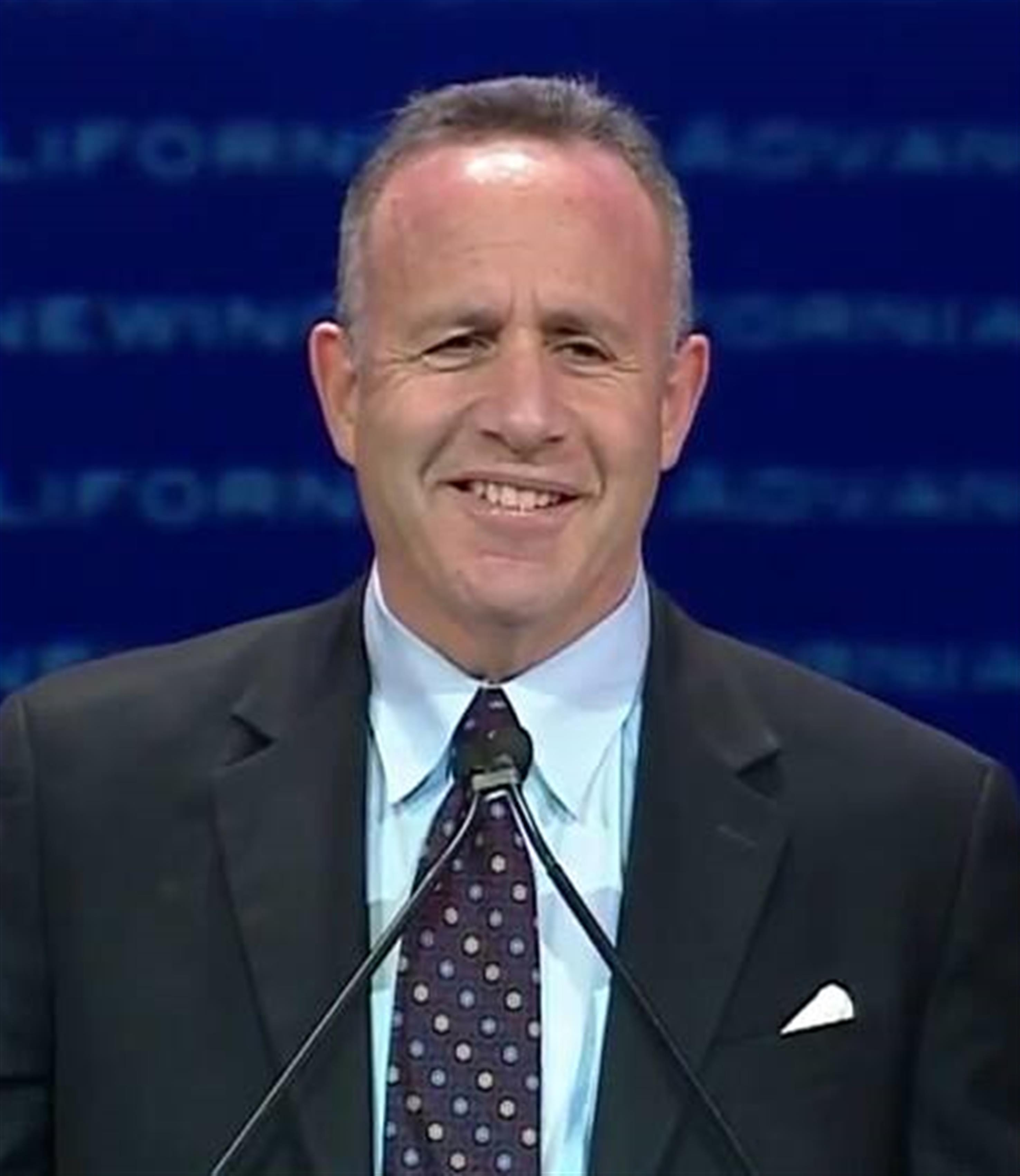

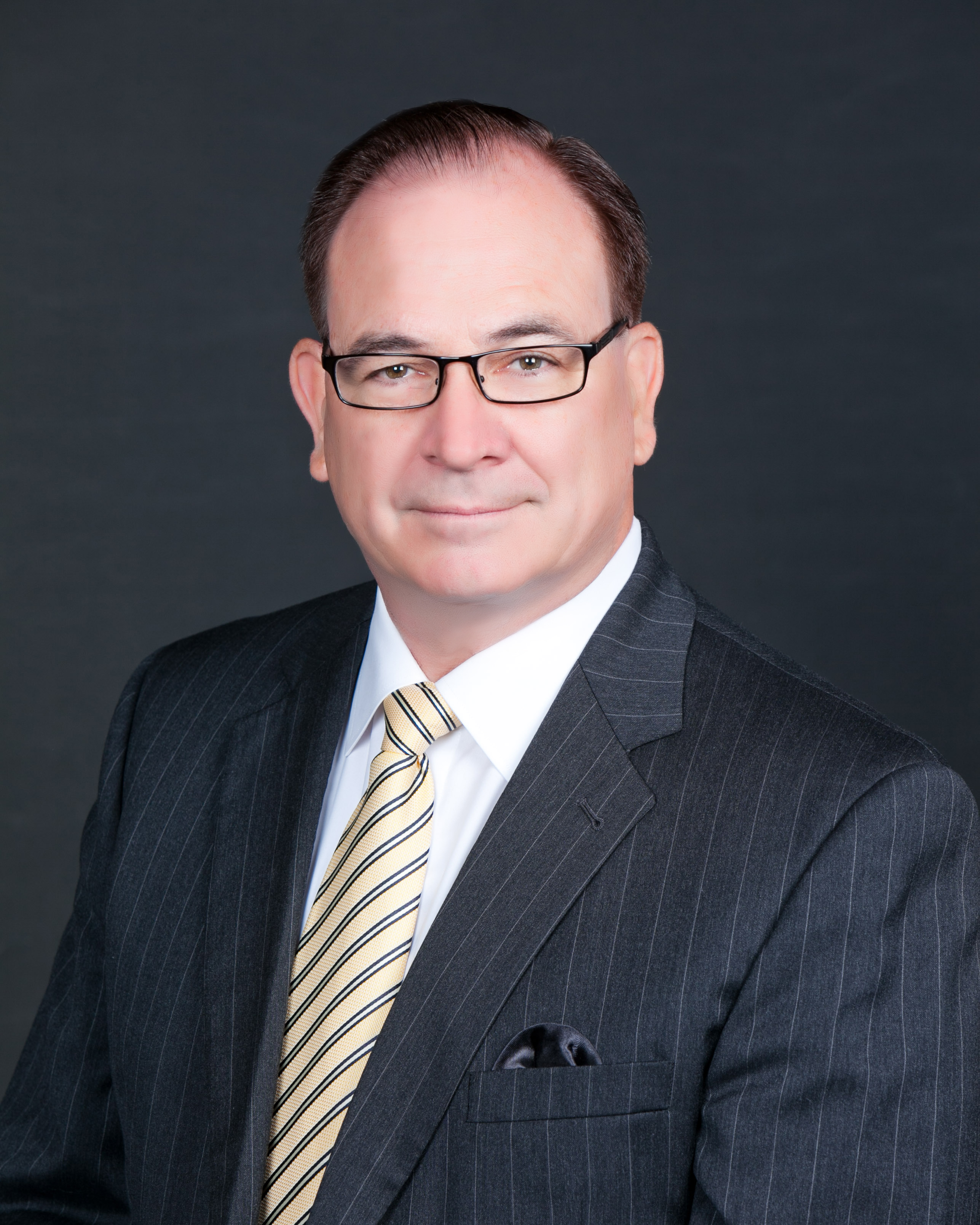
	Majority party	Minority party
Leader	Darrell Steinberg	Bob Huff
Party	Democratic	Republican
Leader's seat	6th–Sacramento	29th–Diamond Bar
Seats before	25	15
Seats after	29	11
Seat change	▲4	▼4
Popular vote	4,035,256	2,321,286
Percentage	62.61%	36.02%
- Results: Democratic gain Democratic hold Republican hold No election held
President pro tempore before election
Darrell Steinberg
Democratic
President pro tempore-designate
Darrell Steinberg
Democratic

The 2012 California State Senate election was held on November 6, 2012, with the primary election on June 5, 2012. Voters in the 20 odd-numbered districts of the California State Senate voted for their representatives. Other elections were also held on November 6. The same year, voters also passed Proposition 28 that relaxed term limits on legislators in both chambers.

== Overview ==
California State Senate elections, 2012 Primary election — June 5, 2012
Party	Votes	Percentage	Candidates	Advancing to general	Seats contesting
Democratic	1,534,788	59.34%	28	22	20
Republican	1,015,668	39.27%	20	16	16
Libertarian	23,098	0.89%	2	0	0
No party preference	11,923	0.46%	1	0	0
Peace and Freedom	788	0.03%	2	2	2
Totals	2,586,265	100.00%	53	40	—

California State Senate elections, 2012 General election — November 6, 2012
Party	Votes	Percentage	Not up	Contested	Before	After	+/–
Democratic	4,035,256	62.61%	14	11	25	29	▲4
Republican	2,321,286	36.02%	6	9	15	11	▼4
Peace and Freedom	88,658	1.38%	0	0	0	0	Steady
Totals	6,445,200	100.00%	20	20	40	40	—

↓
29	11
Democratic	Republican

== Predictions ==
Source	Ranking	As of
Governing	Safe D	October 24, 2012

== Results ==
=== District 1 ===
California's 1st State Senate district election, 2012
Primary election
Party	Candidate	Votes	%
Republican	Ted Gaines (incumbent)	110,168	48.2
Democratic	Julie Griffith-Flatter	68,947	30.2
Republican	Les Baugh	37,442	16.4
No party preference	"Bo" Bogdan I. Ambrozewicz	11,923	5.2
Total votes		228,480	100.0
General election
Republican	Ted Gaines (incumbent)	263,256	63.7
Democratic	Julie Griffith-Flatter	150,111	36.3
Total votes		413,367	100.0
Republican hold			

=== District 3 ===
California's 3rd State Senate district election, 2012
Primary election
Party	Candidate	Votes	%
Democratic	Lois Wolk (incumbent)	116,403	96.9
Republican	Frank Miranda (write-in)	2,402	2.0
Republican	Gary Clift (write-in)	1,341	1.1
Total votes		120,146	100.0
General election
Democratic	Lois Wolk (incumbent)	233,406	66.2
Republican	Frank Miranda	119,033	33.8
Total votes		352,439	100.0
Democratic hold			

=== District 5 ===
California's 5th State Senate district election, 2012
Primary election
Party	Candidate	Votes	%
Democratic	Cathleen Galgiani	52,148	40.7
Republican	Bill Berryhill	45,819	35.8
Republican	Leroy Ornellas	30,109	23.5
Total votes		128,076	100.0
General election
Democratic	Cathleen Galgiani	142,145	50.5
Republican	Bill Berryhill	139,502	49.5
Total votes		281,647	100.0
Democratic win (new seat)			

=== District 7 ===
California's 7th State Senate district election, 2012
Primary election
Party	Candidate	Votes	%
Democratic	Mark DeSaulnier (incumbent)	91,224	57.0
Republican	Mark P. Meuser	68,730	43.0
Total votes		159,954	100.0
General election
Democratic	Mark DeSaulnier (incumbent)	229,105	61.5
Republican	Mark P. Meuser	143,707	38.5
Total votes		372,812	100.0
Democratic hold			

=== District 9 ===
California's 9th State Senate district election, 2012
Primary election
Party	Candidate	Votes	%
Democratic	Loni Hancock (incumbent)	123,624	99.3
Peace and Freedom	Mary Catherine McIlroy (write-in)	785	0.6
Libertarian	Lisa D. Ringer (write-in)	95	0.1
Total votes		124,504	100.0
General election
Democratic	Loni Hancock (incumbent)	300,994	85.8
Peace and Freedom	Mary Catherine McIlroy	49,987	14.2
Total votes		350,981	100.0
Democratic hold			

=== District 11 ===
California's 11th State Senate district election, 2012
Primary election
Party	Candidate	Votes	%
Democratic	Mark Leno (incumbent)	118,023	82.0
Republican	Harmeet Dhillon	25,828	18.0
Total votes		143,851	100.0
General election
Democratic	Mark Leno (incumbent)	303,241	84.7
Republican	Harmeet Dhillon	54,887	15.3
Total votes		358,128	100.0
Democratic hold			

=== District 13 ===
California's 13th State Senate district election, 2012
Primary election
Party	Candidate	Votes	%
Democratic	Jerry Hill	76,033	51.1
Democratic	Sally J. Lieber	33,566	22.5
Libertarian	John H. Webster	23,003	15.4
Democratic	Christopher Kent Chiang	16,317	11.0
Total votes		148,919	100.0
General election
Democratic	Jerry Hill	218,775	66.1
Democratic	Sally J. Lieber	112,321	33.9
Total votes		331,096	100.0
Democratic hold			

=== District 15 ===
California's 15th State Senate district election, 2012
Primary election
Party	Candidate	Votes	%
Democratic	Jim Beall	69,179	55.5
Democratic	Joe Coto	55,387	44.5
Total votes		124,566	100.0
General election
Democratic	Jim Beall	160,451	56.7
Democratic	Joe Coto	122,345	43.3
Total votes		282,796	100.0
Democratic hold			

=== District 17 ===
California's 17th State Senate district election, 2012
Primary election
Party	Candidate	Votes	%
Democratic	Bill Monning	110,890	59.4
Republican	Larry Beaman	75,713	40.6
Total votes		186,603	100.0
General election
Democratic	Bill Monning	236,213	63.3
Republican	Larry Beaman	136,836	36.7
Total votes		373,049	100.0
Democratic gain from Republican			

=== District 19 ===
California's 19th State Senate district election, 2012
Primary election
Party	Candidate	Votes	%
Republican	Mike Stoker	69,252	44.9
Democratic	Hannah-Beth Jackson	64,219	41.6
Democratic	Jason Hodge	20,828	13.5
Total votes		154,299	100.0
General election
Democratic	Hannah-Beth Jackson	180,780	55.7
Republican	Mike Stoker	143,819	44.3
Total votes		324,599	100.0
Democratic gain from Republican			

=== District 21 ===
California's 21st State Senate district election, 2012
Primary election
Party	Candidate	Votes	%
Republican	Steve Knight	61,245	69.0
Democratic	Star Moffatt	27,545	31.0
Total votes		88,790	100.0
General election
Republican	Steve Knight	153,412	57.6
Democratic	Star Moffatt	112,780	42.4
Total votes		266,192	100.0
Republican hold			

=== District 23 ===
California's 23rd State Senate district election, 2012
Primary election
Party	Candidate	Votes	%
Republican	Bill Emmerson (incumbent)	70,465	65.0
Democratic	Melissa Ruth O'Donnell	37,939	35.0
Total votes		108,404	100.0
General election
Republican	Bill Emmerson (incumbent)	159,045	56.3
Democratic	Melissa Ruth O'Donnell	123,518	43.7
Total votes		282,563	100.0
Republican gain from Democratic			

=== District 25 ===
California's 25th State Senate district election, 2012
Primary election
Party	Candidate	Votes	%
Democratic	Carol Liu (incumbent)	62,930	51.3
Republican	Gilbert V. Gonzales	53,093	43.3
Democratic	Ameenah Fuller	6,592	5.4
Total votes		122,615	100.0
General election
Democratic	Carol Liu (incumbent)	213,127	60.8
Republican	Gilbert V. Gonzales	137,651	39.2
Total votes		350,778	100.0
Democratic hold			

=== District 27 ===
California's 27th State Senate district election, 2012
Primary election
Party	Candidate	Votes	%
Republican	Todd Zink	68,384	51.1
Democratic	Fran Pavley (incumbent)	65,552	48.9
Total votes		133,936	100.0
General election
Democratic	Fran Pavley (incumbent)	197,757	53.6
Republican	Todd Zink	171,438	46.4
Total votes		369,195	100.0
Democratic hold			

=== District 29 ===
California's 29th State Senate district election, 2012
Primary election
Party	Candidate	Votes	%
Republican	Bob Huff (incumbent)	68,708	64.3
Democratic	Greg Diamond	38,169	35.7
Total votes		106,877	100.0
General election
Republican	Bob Huff (incumbent)	160,912	55.1
Democratic	Greg Diamond	131,228	44.9
Total votes		292,140	100.0
Republican hold			

=== District 31 ===
California's 31st State Senate district election, 2012
Primary election
Party	Candidate	Votes	%
Republican	Jeff Miller	38,641	51.1
Democratic	Richard Roth	21,812	28.8
Democratic	Steve Clute	15,191	20.1
Total votes		75,644	100.0
General election
Democratic	Richard Roth	133,882	55.3
Republican	Jeff Miller	108,320	44.7
Total votes		242,202	100.0
Democratic win (new seat)			

=== District 33 ===
California's 33rd State Senate district election, 2012
Primary election
Party	Candidate	Votes	%
Democratic	Ricardo Lara	35,865	100.0
Peace and Freedom	Lee H. Chauser (write-in)	3	0.0
Total votes		35,868	100.0
General election
Democratic	Ricardo Lara	158,707	80.4
Peace and Freedom	Lee H. Chauser	38,671	19.6
Total votes		197,378	100.0
Democratic hold			

=== District 35 ===
California's 35th State Senate district election, 2012
Primary election
Party	Candidate	Votes	%
Democratic	Roderick Wright (incumbent)	40,312	57.4
Republican	Charlotte A. Svolos	18,793	26.8
Democratic	Paul Butterfield	11,091	15.8
Total votes		70,196	100.0
General election
Democratic	Roderick Wright (incumbent)	192,483	76.5
Republican	Charlotte A. Svolos	59,077	23.5
Total votes		251,560	100.0
Democratic hold			

=== District 37 ===
California's 37th State Senate district election, 2012
Primary election
Party	Candidate	Votes	%
Republican	Mimi Walters (incumbent)	88,321	63.6
Democratic	Steve Young	50,562	36.4
Total votes		138,883	100.0
General election
Republican	Mimi Walters (incumbent)	213,086	57.0
Democratic	Steve Young	160,595	43.0
Total votes		373,681	100.0
Republican hold			

=== District 39 ===
California's 39th State Senate district election, 2012
Primary election
Party	Candidate	Votes	%
Democratic	Marty Block	85,930	46.3
Republican	George Plescia	81,214	43.7
Democratic	Patrick L. Marsh	18,510	10.0
Total votes		185,654	100.0
General election
Democratic	Marty Block	221,012	58.4
Republican	George Plescia	157,305	41.6
Total votes		378,317	100.0
Democratic hold			
