= California's 5th senatorial district =

American legislative district

California's 5th State Senate district
Current senator
Jerry McNerney; D–Stockton
- Population (2010) • Voting age • Citizen voting age: 939,163; 670,015; 541,374
- Demographics: 40.18% White; 6.55% Black; 37.77% Latino; 12.56% Asian; 1.05% Native American; 0.66% Hawaiian/Pacific Islander; 0.26% other; 0.96% remainder of multiracial
- Registered voters: 477,778
- Registration: 42.19% Democratic; 30.76% Republican; 20.65% No party preference

California's 5th senatorial district is one of 40 California State Senate districts. It is currently represented by Democrat Jerry McNerney of Stockton.

== District profile ==
The district is centered on northern Central Valley, containing San Joaquin County and the northeastern portion of Alameda County. It includes the communities of Livermore, Dublin, Pleasanton, and Sunol.

== Election results from statewide races ==
Year	Office	Results
2022	Governor	Newsom 52.6 – 47.4%
2022	Senator	Padilla 55.4 – 44.6%
2021	Recall	No 51.0 - 49.0%
2021	Recall	Elder 55.0 - 6.6%
2020	President	Biden 54.2 – 43.6%
2018	Governor	Newsom 51.4 – 48.6%
2018	Senator	De Leon 54.6 – 45.4%
2016	President	Clinton 52.5 – 41.8%
2016	Senator	Harris 58.3 – 41.7%
2014	Governor	Brown 53.3 – 46.7%
2012	President	Obama 54.2 – 43.6%
2012	Senator	Feinstein 55.5 – 44.5%

== List of senators representing the district ==
Due to redistricting, the 5th district has been moved around different parts of the state. The current iteration resulted from the 2021 redistricting by the California Citizens Redistricting Commission.

=== 1851–1855: one seat ===
Senators	Party	Years served	Electoral history	Counties represented
George B. Tingley (San Jose)	Whig	January 6, 1851 – January 3, 1853	Elected in 1850. [data missing]	Contra Costa, Santa Clara
Jacob Gruwell (San Jose)	Whig	January 3, 1853 – January 1, 1855	Elected in 1852. Re-elected in 1853. [data missing]	Contra Costa, Santa Clara
Jacob Gruwell (San Jose)	Whig	January 3, 1853 – January 1, 1855	Elected in 1852. Re-elected in 1853. [data missing]	Alameda, Santa Clara

=== 1855–1857: two, then four seats ===
Dates	Seat A			Seat B			Seat C			Seat D			Counties represented
Dates	Member	Party	Electoral history	Member	Party	Electoral history	Member	Party	Electoral history	Member	Party	Electoral history	Counties represented
January 1, 1855 – January 7, 1856	Wilson G. Flint (San Francisco)	Democratic	Elected in 1854. Re-elected in 1855. [data missing]	William W. Hawks (San Francisco)	Democratic	Elected in 1854. Re-elected in 1855. [data missing]	A third seat was added in 1856.			A fourth seat was added in 1856.			San Francisco
January 7, 1856 – January 5, 1857	Wilson G. Flint (San Francisco)	Know Nothing	Elected in 1854. Re-elected in 1855. [data missing]	William W. Hawks (San Francisco)	Know Nothing	Elected in 1854. Re-elected in 1855. [data missing]	William J. Shaw (San Francisco)	Democratic	Elected in 1855. [data missing]	Frank Tilford (San Francisco)	Democratic	Elected in 1855. Resigned.	San Francisco

=== 1857–1858: one seat ===
Senators	Party	Years served	Electoral history	Counties represented
Eugene L. Sullivan (San Francisco)	Republican	January 5, 1857 – January 4, 1858	Elected in 1856.	San Francisco, San Mateo

=== 1858–1863: three, then two seats ===
Dates	Seat A			Seat B			Seat C			Counties represented
Dates	Member	Party	Electoral history	Member	Party	Electoral history	Member	Party	Electoral history	Counties represented
January 4, 1858 – January 3, 1859	Gilbert A. Grant (San Francisco)	Republican	Elected in 1857. Re-elected in 1858. [data missing]	Timothy G. Phelps (San Mateo)	Republican	Elected in 1857. [data missing]	Samuel Soule (San Francisco)	Republican	Elected in 1857. [data missing]	San Francisco
January 3, 1859 – October 6, 1859	Gilbert A. Grant (San Francisco)	Republican	Elected in 1857. Re-elected in 1858. [data missing]	Samuel H. Parker (San Francisco)	Republican	Elected in 1858. [data missing]	Charles H. S. Williams (San Francisco)	Republican	Elected in 1858. Resigned.	San Francisco
October 6, 1859 – January 2, 1860	Gilbert A. Grant (San Francisco)	Republican	Elected in 1857. Re-elected in 1858. [data missing]	Samuel H. Parker (San Francisco)	Republican	Elected in 1858. [data missing]	Vacant			San Francisco
January 2, 1860 – January 7, 1861	Sol A. Sharp (San Francisco)	Democratic	Elected in 1859. [data missing]	Timothy G. Phelps (San Mateo)	Republican	Elected in 1859. [data missing]	Third seat was eliminated in 1861			San Francisco, San Mateo
January 7, 1861 – January 6, 1862	Caleb Burbank (Stockton)	Republican	Elected in 1860. [data missing]	James M. Shafter (San Francisco)	Republican	Elected in 1860. [data missing]	Third seat was eliminated in 1861			San Francisco, San Mateo
January 7, 1861 – January 6, 1862	Caleb Burbank (Stockton)	Republican	Elected in 1860. [data missing]	James M. Shafter (San Francisco)	Union	Elected in 1860. [data missing]	Third seat was eliminated in 1861			San Francisco, San Mateo

=== 1863–present: one seat ===
Senators	Party	Years served	Electoral history	Counties represented
John G. McCullough (Mariposa)	Union	January 6, 1862 – December 7, 1863	Elected in 1862. Retired to run for Attorney General of California.	Mariposa, Merced, Stanislaus
Warren S. Montgomery (Stockton)	Democratic	December 7, 1863 – December 4, 1865	Elected in 1863. [data missing]	Mariposa, Merced, Stanislaus
[data missing]		December 4, 1865 – December 2, 1867	[data missing]	Mariposa, Merced, Stanislaus
James H. Lawrence (Modesto)	Democratic	December 2, 1867 – December 6, 1869	Elected in 1867. Re-elected in 1868. [data missing]	Mariposa, Merced, Stanislaus
[data missing]		December 6, 1869 – December 4, 1871	[data missing]	Mariposa, Merced, Stanislaus
Thomas J. Keyes (Modesto)	Democratic	December 4, 1871 – December 6, 1875	Elected in 1871. Re-elected in 1873. [data missing]	Mariposa, Merced, Stanislaus
[data missing]		December 6, 1875 – January 5, 1880	[data missing]	Mariposa, Merced, Stanislaus
David M. Pool (Mariposa)	Democratic	January 5, 1880 – January 8, 1883	Elected in 1879. [data missing]	Mariposa, Merced, Stanislaus
John D. Spencer (Modesto)	Democratic	January 8, 1883 – January 3, 1887	Elected in 1882. Retired to become Clerk of the Supreme Court of California.	Mariposa, Merced, Stanislaus
Austin Walrath (Nevada City)	Republican	January 3, 1887 – January 7, 1889	Elected in 1886. [data missing]	Nevada
E. M. Preston (Nevada City)	Republican	January 7, 1889 – January 2, 1893	Elected in 1888. [data missing]	Nevada
Noble Martin (Dutch Flat)	Democratic	January 2, 1893 – September 1, 1896	Elected in 1892. Died.	El Dorado, Placer
Vacant		September 1, 1896 – January 4, 1897		El Dorado, Placer
Emery W. Chapman (El Dorado)	Democratic	January 4, 1897 – January 1, 1901	Elected in 1896. [data missing]	El Dorado, Placer
William B. Lardner (Auburn)	Republican	January 1, 1901 – January 2, 1905	Elected in 1900. [data missing]	El Dorado, Placer
Benjamin F. Rush (Suisun)	Republican	January 2, 1905 – January 7, 1929	Elected in 1904. Re-elected in 1908. Re-elected in 1912. Re-elected in 1916. Re-elected in 1920. Re-elected in 1924. Re-elected in 1928.	Napa, Solano
Thomas McCormack (Ria Vista)	Republican	January 7, 1929 – January 2, 1933	Elected in 1928. Redistricted to the 15th district.	Napa, Solano
John B. McColl (Redding)	Republican	January 2, 1933 – December 19, 1938	Elected in 1932. Re-elected in 1936. Died.	Shasta, Trinity
Vacant		December 19, 1938 – January 24, 1939		Shasta, Trinity
Jesse W. Carter (Redding)	Democratic	January 24, 1939 – September 12, 1939	Elected to finish McColl's term. Resigned.	Shasta, Trinity
Vacant		September 12, 1939 – January 6, 1941		Shasta, Trinity
Oliver J. Carter (Redding)	Democratic	January 6, 1941 – January 3, 1949	Elected in 1940. Re-elected in 1944. Retired.	Shasta, Trinity
Edwin J. Regan (Weaverville)	Democratic	January 3, 1949 – January 3, 1965	Elected in 1948. Re-elected in 1952. Re-elected in 1956. Re-elected in 1960. Resigned.	Shasta, Trinity
Vacant		January 3, 1965 – March 26, 1965		Shasta, Trinity
Fred W. Marler Jr. (Redding)	Republican	March 26, 1965 – January 2, 1967	Elected to finish Regan's term. Redistricted to the 2nd district.	Shasta, Trinity
Albert S. Rodda (Sacramento)	Democratic	January 2, 1967 – November 30, 1976	Redistricted from the 19th district and re-elected in 1966. Re-elected in 1968. Re-elected in 1972. Redistricted to the 3rd district.	Sacramento
Milton Marks (San Francisco)	Republican	December 6, 1976 – November 30, 1984	Redistricted from the 9th district and re-elected in 1976. Re-elected in 1980. Redistricted to the 3rd district.	San Francisco
John Garamendi (Walnut Grove)	Democratic	December 3, 1984 – September 3, 1990	Redistricted from the 13th district and re-elected in 1984. Re-elected in 1988. Resigned after election as California Insurance Commissioner.	Alpine, Amador, Calaveras, El Dorado, Mono, Sacramento, San Joaquin, Stanislaus, Tuolumne
John Garamendi (Walnut Grove)	Democratic	December 3, 1984 – September 3, 1990	Redistricted from the 13th district and re-elected in 1984. Re-elected in 1988. Resigned after election as California Insurance Commissioner.	Alpine, Amador, Calaveras, Sacramento, San Joaquin, Tuolumne, Yolo
Vacant		September 3, 1990 – January 10, 1991		Alpine, Amador, Calaveras, Sacramento, San Joaquin, Tuolumne, Yolo
Patrick Johnston (Stockton)	Democratic	January 10, 1991 – November 30, 2000	Elected to finish Garamendi's term. Re-elected in 1992. Re-elected in 1996. Term-limited and retired.	Alpine, Amador, Calaveras, Sacramento, San Joaquin, Tuolumne, Yolo
Patrick Johnston (Stockton)	Democratic	January 10, 1991 – November 30, 2000	Elected to finish Garamendi's term. Re-elected in 1992. Re-elected in 1996. Term-limited and retired.	Sacramento, San Joaquin
Michael Machado (Linden)	Democratic	December 4, 2000 – November 30, 2008	Elected in 2000. Re-elected in 2004. Term-limited and retired.	Sacramento, San Joaquin
Michael Machado (Linden)	Democratic	December 4, 2000 – November 30, 2008	Elected in 2000. Re-elected in 2004. Term-limited and retired.	Sacramento, San Joaquin, Solano, Yolo
Lois Wolk (Davis)	Democratic	December 1, 2008 – November 30, 2012	Elected in 2008. Redistricted to the 3rd district.	Sacramento, San Joaquin, Solano, Yolo
Cathleen Galgiani (Stockton)	Democratic	December 3, 2012 – November 30, 2020	Elected in 2012. Re-elected in 2016. Term-limited and retired.	Sacramento, San Joaquin, Stanislaus
Susan Eggman (Stockton)	Democratic	December 7, 2020 – November 30, 2024	Elected in 2020. Term-limited and retired.	Sacramento, San Joaquin, Stanislaus
Jerry McNerney (Stockton)	Democratic	December 2, 2024 – present	Elected in 2024.	Sacramento, San Joaquin, Stanislaus

== Election results (1990-present) ==
=== 2024 ===
2024 California State Senate 5th district election
Primary election
Party	Candidate	Votes	%
Republican	Jim Shoemaker	75,630	43.7
Democratic	Jerry McNerney	57,435	33.2
Democratic	Carlos Villapudua	39,958	23.1
Total votes		173,023	100.0
General election
Democratic	Jerry McNerney	189,668	52.9
Republican	Jim Shoemaker	169,136	47.1
Total votes		358,804	100.0
Democratic hold			

=== 2020 ===
2020 California State Senate 5th district election
Primary election
Party	Candidate	Votes	%
Democratic	Susan Eggman	71,808	34.9
Republican	Jim Ridenour	49,398	24.0
Democratic	Mani Grewal	40,086	19.5
Republican	Jesús Andrade	32,836	16.0
Republican	Kathleen A. Garcia	11,499	5.6
Total votes		205,627	100.0
General election
Democratic	Susan Eggman	217,651	54.9
Republican	Jim Ridenour	178,915	45.1
Total votes		396,566	100.0
Democratic hold			

=== 2016 ===
2016 California State Senate 5th district election
Primary election
Party	Candidate	Votes	%
Democratic	Cathleen Galgiani (incumbent)	96,710	56.8
Republican	Alan Nakanishi	47,355	27.8
Republican	Samuel Anderson	26,343	15.5
Total votes		170,408	100.0
General election
Democratic	Cathleen Galgiani (incumbent)	174,847	56.7
Republican	Alan Nakanishi	133,604	43.3
Total votes		308,451	100.0
Democratic hold			

=== 2012 ===
2012 California State Senate 5th district election
Primary election
Party	Candidate	Votes	%
Democratic	Cathleen Galgiani	52,148	40.7
Republican	Bill Berryhill	45,819	35.8
Republican	Leroy Ornellas	30,109	23.5
Total votes		128,076	100.0
General election
Democratic	Cathleen Galgiani	142,145	50.5
Republican	Bill Berryhill	139,502	49.5
Total votes		281,647	100.0
Democratic hold			

=== 2008 ===
2008 California State Senate 5th district election
Party	Candidate	Votes	%
Democratic	Lois Wolk	207,108	64.5
Republican	Greg Aghazarian	113,778	35.5
Total votes		320,886	100.0
Democratic hold			

=== 2004 ===
2004 California State Senate 5th district election
Party	Candidate	Votes	%
Democratic	Michael Machado (incumbent)	154,519	52.2
Republican	Gary A. Podesto	141,539	47.8
Total votes		296,058	100.0
Democratic hold			

=== 2000 ===
2000 California State Senate 5th district election
Party	Candidate	Votes	%
Democratic	Michael Machado	142,392	48.1
Republican	Alan Nakanishi	141,013	47.6
Libertarian	Carole Brow	10,208	3.5
Natural Law	William S. Nicolas	2,667	0.9
Total votes		296,280	100.0
Democratic hold			

=== 1996 ===
1992 California State Senate 5th district election
Party	Candidate	Votes	%
Democratic	Patrick Johnston (incumbent)	159,932	60.1
Republican	Kurt C. Boese	108,075	39.9
Total votes		268,007	100.0
Democratic hold			

=== 1992 ===
1992 California State Senate 5th district election
Party	Candidate	Votes	%
Democratic	Patrick Johnston (incumbent)	162,122	57.5
Republican	Ron Stauffer	105,333	37.3
Libertarian	Eric Roberts	14,713	5.2
Total votes		282,168	100.0
Democratic hold			

=== 1991 (special) ===
1991 California State Senate 5th district special election Vacancy resulting from the resignation of John Garamendi
Party	Candidate	Votes	%
Democratic	Patrick Johnston	54,554	56.8
Republican	Philip Wallace	36,691	38.2
Libertarian	Thomas Tyron	4,864	5.1
No party	David E. Ross (write-in)	2	0.0
Total votes		96,111	100.0
Democratic hold			

== See also ==
- California State Senate
- California State Senate districts
- Districts in California
