= California's 5th district =

California's 5th district may refer to:

- California's 5th congressional district
- California's 5th State Assembly district
- California's 5th State Senate district
