= Jamie Lawrence =

Jamie Lawrence may refer to:

- Jamie Lawrence (footballer, born 1970)
- Jamie Lawrence (footballer, born 2002)

== See also ==
- James Lawrence (disambiguation)
