= KCSM (FM) =

Jazz music public radio station in San Mateo, California

San Mateo, California; United States
- Broadcast area: San Mateo; San Francisco; Oakland; San Jose, California
- Frequency: 91.1 MHz (HD Radio)
- Branding: Jazz 91

Programming
- Format: Jazz
- Subchannels: HD2: Jazz

Ownership
- Owner: San Mateo County Community College District

History
- First air date: October 1964
- Call sign meaning: College of San Mateo

Technical information
- Licensing authority: FCC
- Facility ID: 58913
- Class: B1
- ERP: 11,000 watts
- HAAT: 113 meters (371 ft)
- Transmitter coordinates: 37°32′7.8″N 122°20′3.7″W

Links
- Public license information: Public file; LMS
- Website: www.kcsm.org

KCSM (91.1 MHz) is an FM radio station in San Mateo, California. The station broadcasts jazz music, 24 hours a day, commercial-free. The radio station is not-for-profit, and listener-supported. The broadcast is mirrored as streaming media on the World Wide Web, extending the station's audience far beyond the San Francisco Bay Area. Owned by the San Mateo County Community College District, the station serves the San Francisco Bay Area from studios and a transmitter both located inside and outside the ground floor (floor letter G) of building number 9 (the Library and Learning Resources Center) on the campus of the College of San Mateo on West Hillsdale Boulevard along East Perimeter Road in the southwestern section of San Mateo.

== History ==
KCSM radio and KCSM-TV were originally established by the College of San Mateo as training facilities for radio and TV broadcasters. Many well-known media personalities were educated at the College of San Mateo, including tabloid TV reporter Steve Wilson, ESPN sportscaster, San Francisco Giants announcer Jon Miller and K101 air personality Jeff Serr.

Between 1964 and 1980, the College of San Mateo offered a full range of courses in broadcasting and broadcast electronics, unusual for a community college; they were much more extensive than better known 4-year university programs. The television station and its companion radio station were staffed and operated by students. Some of the programs were obtained from independent producers, such as the show Radio à la Carte directed by Emmanuel Serriere. This was discontinued in the 1980s, and today KCSM is operated by professional broadcasters.

In 1985 KCSM station manager Anne Wietzel placed three jazz programs on air. These were tentpoled by NPR programs Morning Edition and All Things Considered. In 1986, Wietzel and program director Clifford Brown, Jr. began the slow transition of KCSM to a full time jazz station with professional staff. The feeling was that KCSM could better fulfill its mission of educating students and serving underserved communities this way. At this time KCSM also had specialty music programming such as bluegrass ("Bay Area Bluegrass Sunday"), classical, world and others, along with NPR programs.

In 1987, in addition to jazz programs, two local shows began, titled "Studio 170" and "New Frontiers". "Studio 170" was hosted and produced by Jay Peterson (JP) and "New Frontiers" was produced and hosted by Phil Adcock. Peterson and Adcock featured "New Age" and electronic music, styles which received minimal broadcasting on Bay Area radio at the time. Despite these two programs being broadcast early Saturday mornings, when most people were asleep, they had a huge local Bay Area following, providing radio exposure to many Windham Hill artists, as well as artists on smaller labels.

By late 1987 most of the specialty music and talk programming gave way to jazz. A professional, experienced air staff was hired including Alisa Clancy, John Rodgers, Dick Conte and others. KCSM was on its way to becoming one of the nation's top jazz stations.

In 1994, KJAZ was sold and discontinued its jazz format. KCSM took over many of KJAZ's jazz CDs and vinyl recordings and added them to its library.

Sister station KCSM-TV was sold to the owners of KRCB in July 2018 and renamed KPJK; despite the sale, KCSM radio continued to be simulcast on KPJK subchannel 60.6 as "KCSM Jazz TV", even though the radio station was retained by the San Mateo County Community College District.

== HD Radio ==
KCSM also broadcasts its main signal in HD Radio. The channels are: KCSM HD1 and KCSM HD2.

== See also ==
- List of jazz radio stations in the United States
