= Senator Roth (disambiguation) =

William Roth (1921–2003) was a U.S. Senator from Delaware from 1971 to 2001. Senator Roth may also refer to:

- Richard Roth (politician) (born 1950), California State Senate
- Roger Roth (born 1978), Wisconsin State Senate
