= James Lawrence (disambiguation) =

James Lawrence (1781–1813) was an American naval officer.

James Lawrence may also refer to:

- James Lawrence (cricketer, born 1976), English cricketer, played for Durham in 1995 and British Universities in 1998
- James Lawrence (New Zealand cricketer) (1867–1946), New Zealand cricketer, played for Canterbury and New Zealand
- James Lawrence (Wellington cricketer) (1849–1898), New Zealand cricketer
- James Lawrence (Cambridgeshire cricketer) (1785–?), English cricketer
- James Lawrence (footballer) (born 1992), Wales international footballer
- James Lawrence (Ohio politician) (1851–1914), Democratic politician from the state of Ohio
- James Lawrence (triathlete), American triathlete
- James Lawrence (rower) (1907–1995), American rower
- Sir James Lawrence, 1st Baronet (1820–1897), British Member of Parliament for Lambeth, 1865 and 1868–1885
- James Duncan Lawrence (author) (1918–1994), U.S. author
- James E. Lawrence (1882–1941), American football player
- James F. Lawrence Jr. (1918–2006), American Marine Corps Navy Cross recipient, lawyer
- James H. Lawrence, member of the California legislature
- James Henry Lawrence (1773–1840), British writer
- James M. Lawrence (born 1946), publisher of Harrowsmith Magazine
- James R. Lawrence (1790–1874), American lawyer, politician, and judge from New York
- Jamie Lawrence (footballer, born 1970), Jamaican footballer
- Jamie Lawrence (footballer, born 2002)
- Jamie Lawrence, staff of MuggleNet

== See also ==
- Jim Lawrence (disambiguation)
