= Senator Desmond =

Senator Desmond may refer to:

- Cornelius Desmond (Irish politician) (1898–1974), Senate of Ireland
- Earl D. Desmond (1895–1958), California State Senate
- Eileen Desmond (1932–2005), Senate of Ireland
- Thomas C. Desmond (1887–1972), New York State Senate
