= California's 17th district =

California's 17th district may refer to:

- California's 17th congressional district
- California's 17th State Assembly district
- California's 17th State Senate district
