= John McColl =

John McColl may refer to:

- John McColl (British Army officer) (born 1952), British Army officer and Lieutenant Governor of Jersey
- John McColl (politician) (1875–1933), politician and member of the Legislative Assembly of Alberta
- John B. McColl (Canadian politician) (1861–1940), Canadian politician, member of the Canadian Parliament
- John B. McColl (California politician), served in the California legislature
- John M. “Ian” McColl (1927–2008), Scottish footballer and manager
