= Tom Berryhill =

American politician (1953–2020)

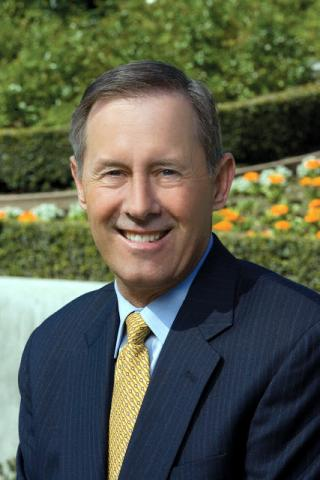

Member of the California State Senate
- In office December 6, 2010 – November 30, 2018
- Preceded by: Dave Cogdill
- Succeeded by: Andreas Borgeas
- Constituency: 14th district (2010–2014); 8th district (2014–2018)

Member of the California State Assembly from the 25th district
- In office December 4, 2006 – November 30, 2010
- Preceded by: Dave Cogdill
- Succeeded by: Kristin Olsen

Personal details
- Born: Thomas Charles Berryhill; August 27, 1953 Ceres, California
- Died: August 29, 2020 (aged 67) Modesto, California
- Party: Republican
- Spouse: Loretta Berryhill
- Relations: Clare Berryhill (father); Bill Berryhill (brother); Mike Berryhill (cousin)
- Children: Jessica; Samantha
- Education: California Polytechnic State University
- Occupation: Farmer; small businessman

Thomas Charles Berryhill (August 27, 1953 – August 29, 2020) was an American Republican politician. He was a member of the Stanislaus County Board of Supervisors from January 7, 2019, until his death. He previously represented the 8th district in the California State Senate from December 6, 2010, to November 30, 2018. He had also served in the California State Assembly, representing the 25th district from December 4, 2006, to November 30, 2010.

After graduating from Ceres High School, Berryhill attended California Polytechnic State University, San Luis Obispo.

Berryhill's brother, Bill, represented the 26th district in the State Assembly from 2008 to 2012. Their father, Clare, served in the State Assembly from 1969 to 1970 and the State Senate from 1972 to 1976.

Berryhill was diagnosed with Parkinson's disease in 2018.
