= Michael Machado =

American politician (born 1948)

Michael Machdo
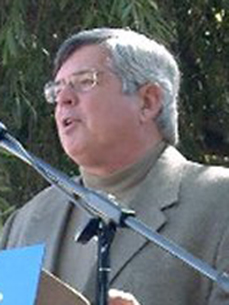
- Machado in 2006

Member of the California Senate from the 5th district
- In office December 4, 2000 – November 30, 2008
- Preceded by: Patrick Johnson
- Succeeded by: Lois Wolk

Member of the California State Assembly from the 17th district
- In office December 5, 1994 – November 30, 2000
- Preceded by: Dean Andal
- Succeeded by: Barbara S. Matthews

Personal details
- Born: March 12, 1948 (age 78) Stockton, California, U.S.
- Party: Democratic
- Spouse: Diana
- Children: 3
- Education: Stanford University; University of California, Davis; Harvard Business School

Military service
- Branch/service: United States Navy
- Battles/wars: Vietnam War

Michael J. Machado (born March 12, 1948) is a Democratic politician from Linden, California. He served from 2000 to 2008 in the California State Senate. Machado represented the 5th District, which includes the cities of Tracy, Manteca and Stockton in San Joaquin County; Suisun City, Fairfield, Dixon and Vacaville in Solano County; Davis, West Sacramento, Winters and Woodland in Yolo County; as well as Walnut Grove and a portion of Elk Grove in Sacramento County.

== Background ==
Machado was born to William John Machado and Grace Fenley Machado, and had two siblings. His paternal grandparents immigrated to California from the Azores.

Machado graduated with a degree in Economics from Stanford University, earned his master's degree in agricultural economics from the University of California, Davis, and in 1988 attended the Harvard Business School Agribusiness Seminar. Machado served in the United States Navy during the Vietnam War. Prior to entering the State Legislature, he served on the board of a major California food processor and worked for the Agency for International Development in Eastern Europe and Russia assisting farmers with the transition from a closed to an open market economy.

Machado owns and operates a family farm in Linden. He and his wife Diana have three children: Erahm, Melissa and Christopher (deceased).

== California State Assembly ==
Machado represented the California State Assembly's 17th District from 1994 to 2000. He distinguished himself as a pragmatic legislator who supports education reform, "balanced" environmental regulations and tax relief for all Californians. Since his election in 1994, Machado has authored legislation protecting school children from perpetrators by creating safety zones around schools, establishing drug rehabilitation programs in county jails, and providing a moratorium on gun shows illegally selling weapons. During the last legislative session, he was instrumental in crafting legislation designed to stop the unfair practice of "predatory lending."

Machado was the subject of a recall effort by the state GOP in the summer of 1995, which failed.

== California State Senate ==
Machado chaired the Senate Banking Committee and the Sub-Committee on Delta Resources. He also served on the Senate Committees on Budget and Fiscal Review, Local Government, Natural Resources and Water, and Transportation and Housing. Additionally, he was a member of the Select Committees on the California Correctional System. Two of Machado's most notable accomplishments were Proposition 13 (Safe Drinking Water, Clean Water, Watershed Protection, and Flood Protection Bond Act) which Machado authored, and the passage of Proposition 50, the Water Security, Clean Drinking Water, Coastal and Beach Protection Act of 2002.

Machado was supported by Handgun Control, the California League of Conservation Voters, California Nurses' Association, California Teachers Association, Building and Construction Trades, and many other labor groups. Machado also received the support of the California Abortion and Reproductive Rights Action League (CARAL) and Planned Parenthood.

== Later endeavors ==
Machado was appointed to the State Fund's board of directors in 2009. In 2010, Machado was named the Director of the Delta Protection Commission.

Machado has served on the board of directors of PICO Holdings, Inc. since 2013. Since that time, the company's stock price has fallen by over 65% from over $25 to under $9 per share. Machado was criticized by shareholders for approving an executive compensation plan that is widely perceived as excessive.

Political offices
Preceded by Dean Andal	California State Assemblyman, 17th District; 1994-2000	Succeeded by Barbara S. Matthews
Preceded by Patrick Johnston	California State Senate, 5th District; 2000–2008	Succeeded by Lois Wolk
