= Clare Berryhill =

American politician

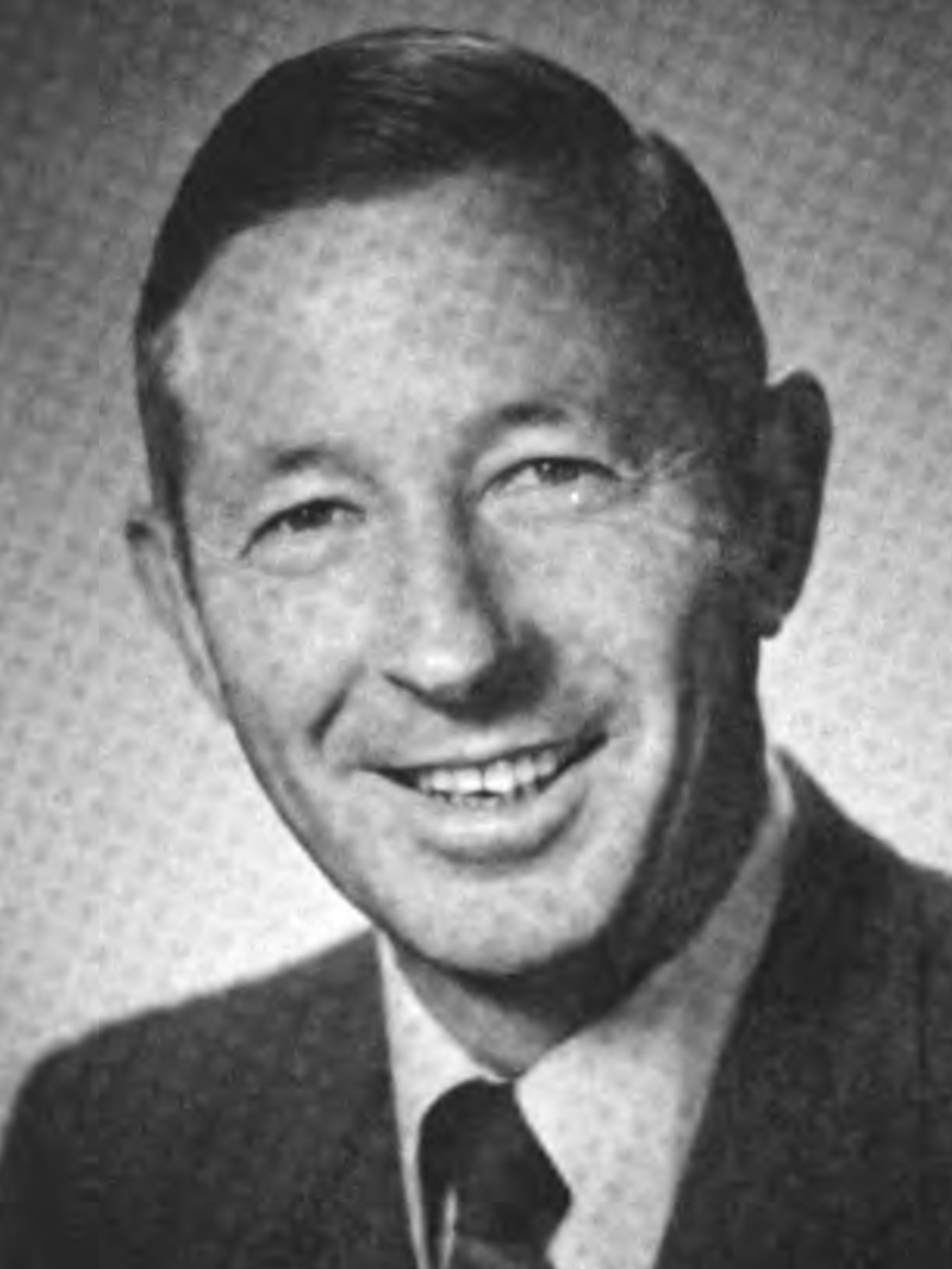
- Official portrait, 1975

Member of the California Senate from the 3rd district
- In office January 8, 1973 – November 30, 1976
- Preceded by: Stephen P. Teale
- Succeeded by: Albert S. Rodda

Member of the California State Assembly from the 30th district
- In office June 4, 1969 – January 4, 1971
- Preceded by: John Veneman
- Succeeded by: Ernest LaCoste

Personal details
- Born: December 4, 1925 Fresno County, California
- Died: March 18, 1996 (aged 70) Ceres, California
- Party: Republican
- Spouse: Maryellen Berryhill
- Children: 5, including Tom and Bill

Clare L. Berryhill (December 4, 1925 – March 18, 1996) was an American politician.

Berryhill was born in Fresno County, California. He lived in Ceres, California, and was a grape grower. He served in the California State Assembly from 1969 to 1971 and in the California Senate from 1973 to 1977. Berryhill was a Republican. In 1983, Berryhill served as the Secretary of the California Department of Food and Agriculture. Berryhill died from cancer in Ceres, California. His sons Bill Berryhill and Tom Berryhill also served in the California Legislature.
