= Fred W. Marler Jr. =

American politician and judge

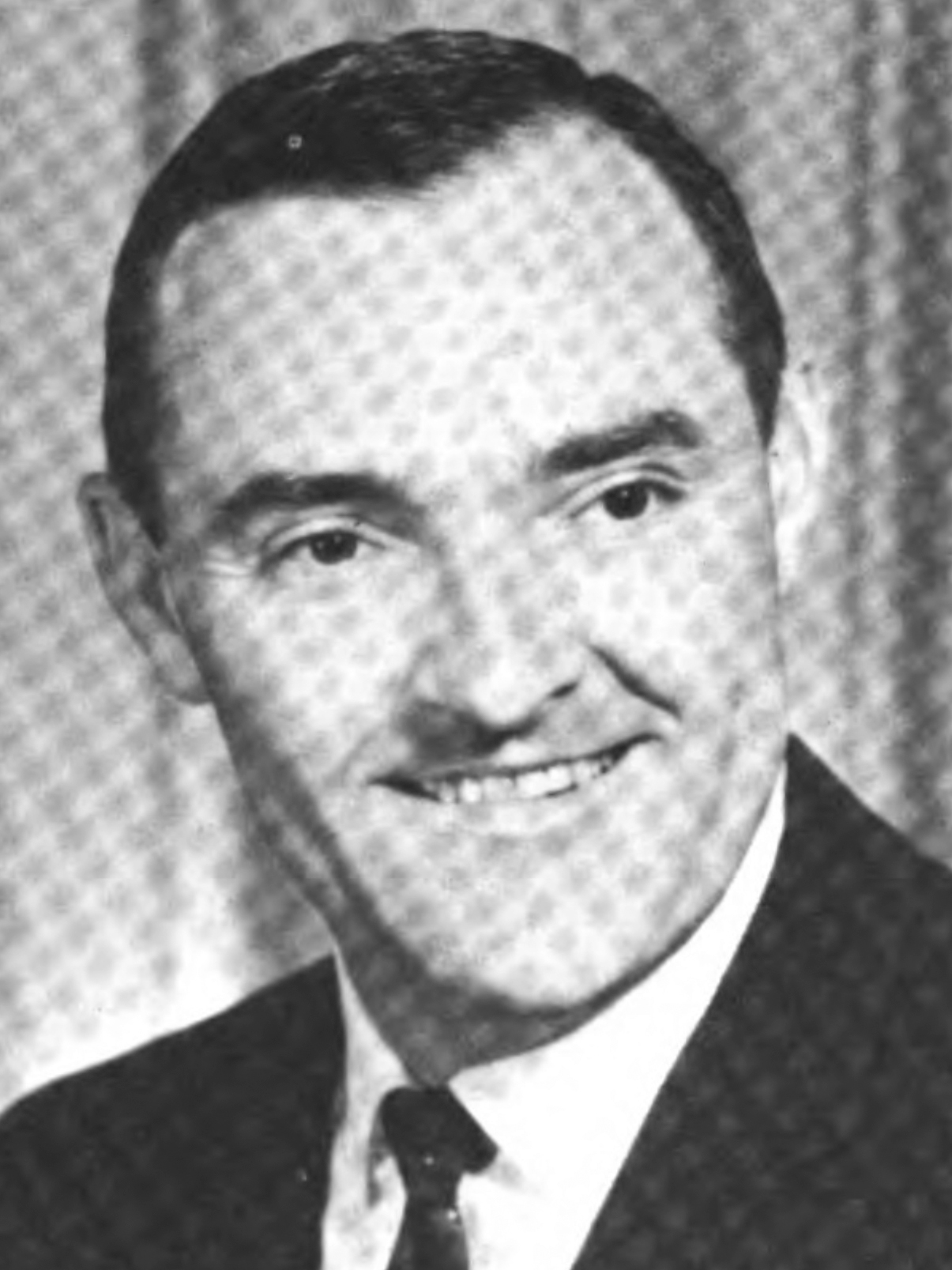

Member of the California State Senate from the 2nd district
- In office January 2, 1967 – November 30, 1974
- Preceded by: Randolph Collier
- Succeeded by: Peter H. Behr

Member of the California Senate from the 5th district
- In office March 26, 1965 – January 2, 1967
- Preceded by: Edwin J. Regan
- Succeeded by: Albert S. Rodda

Personal details
- Born: April 6, 1932 Auburn, California, U.S.
- Died: September 19, 1998 (aged 66) Sacramento, California U.S.
- Party: Republican
- Spouse: Irene Carlson (m. 1955)
- Children: 2
- Education: University of California, Berkeley

Military service
- Allegiance: United States
- Branch/service: United States Air Force
- Battles/wars: Korean War

Fred William Marler Jr. (April 6, 1932 – September 19, 1998) was an American politician and judge.

== California Senate ==
Marler served in the California State Senate for the 5th district from 1965 to 1967 and the 2nd district from 1967 to 1974.
