= Cathleen Galgiani =

American politician (born 1964)

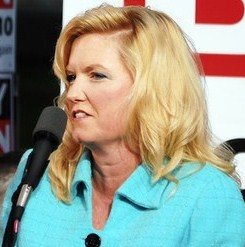

Member of the California State Senate from the 5th district
- In office December 3, 2012 – December 7th, 2020
- Preceded by: Lois Wolk
- Succeeded by: Susan Eggman

Member of the California State Assembly from the 17th district
- In office December 4, 2006 – November 30, 2012
- Preceded by: Barbara S. Matthews
- Succeeded by: Tom Ammiano (redistricted)

Personal details
- Born: January 4, 1964 (age 62) Stockton, California, U.S.
- Party: Democratic
- Education: California State University, Sacramento
- Profession: Physical therapy aide

Cathleen Galgiani (born January 4, 1964) is an American politician who served in the California State Senate. A Democrat, she represented the 5th Senate District, which encompasses San Joaquin County, and portions of Stanislaus and Sacramento counties.

Galgiani was a member of the California Legislative LGBT Caucus. Prior to her election to the State Senate in 2012, she served in the California State Assembly, representing the 17th Assembly District. Before her service as an elected official, she was the Chief of Staff to her predecessor, Assemblymember Barbara Matthews.

== Biography ==
Galgiani attended San Joaquin Delta College before receiving her bachelor's degree from California State University, Sacramento. Prior to working in the Legislature, Galgiani spent eight years as a physical therapy aide at San Joaquin General Hospital and Dameron Hospital in San Joaquin County.

Galgiani served as the consultant to the legislative committee on the development of University of California, Merced, and helped secure funding for the university. She also served as a staffer for Pat Johnston, John Garamendi, and Barbara Matthews.

In a 2011 interview with the Stockton Record, Galgiani publicly disclosed that she is gay. She became the eighth openly LGBT member serving in the California Legislature at the time.

Galgiani was first elected to the State Senate after narrowly defeating Republican Assemblyman Bill Berryhill on November 6, 2012. In 2016, she won a second term, defeating Lodi Mayor Alan Nakanishi.

In 2018 Galgiani ran to represent the 2nd district on the California Board of Equalization. She finished third in the primary, 1.2 points behind second place, and was eliminated from the general election.

== Political positions ==
In March 2018, Galgiani introduced legislation to prohibit the sale of cosmetics tested on animals after January 1, 2020. She said the legislation was necessary due to federal inaction on cruelty-free cosmetics. Governor Jerry Brown signed the bill in September 2018.
