= Albert S. Rodda =

American politician

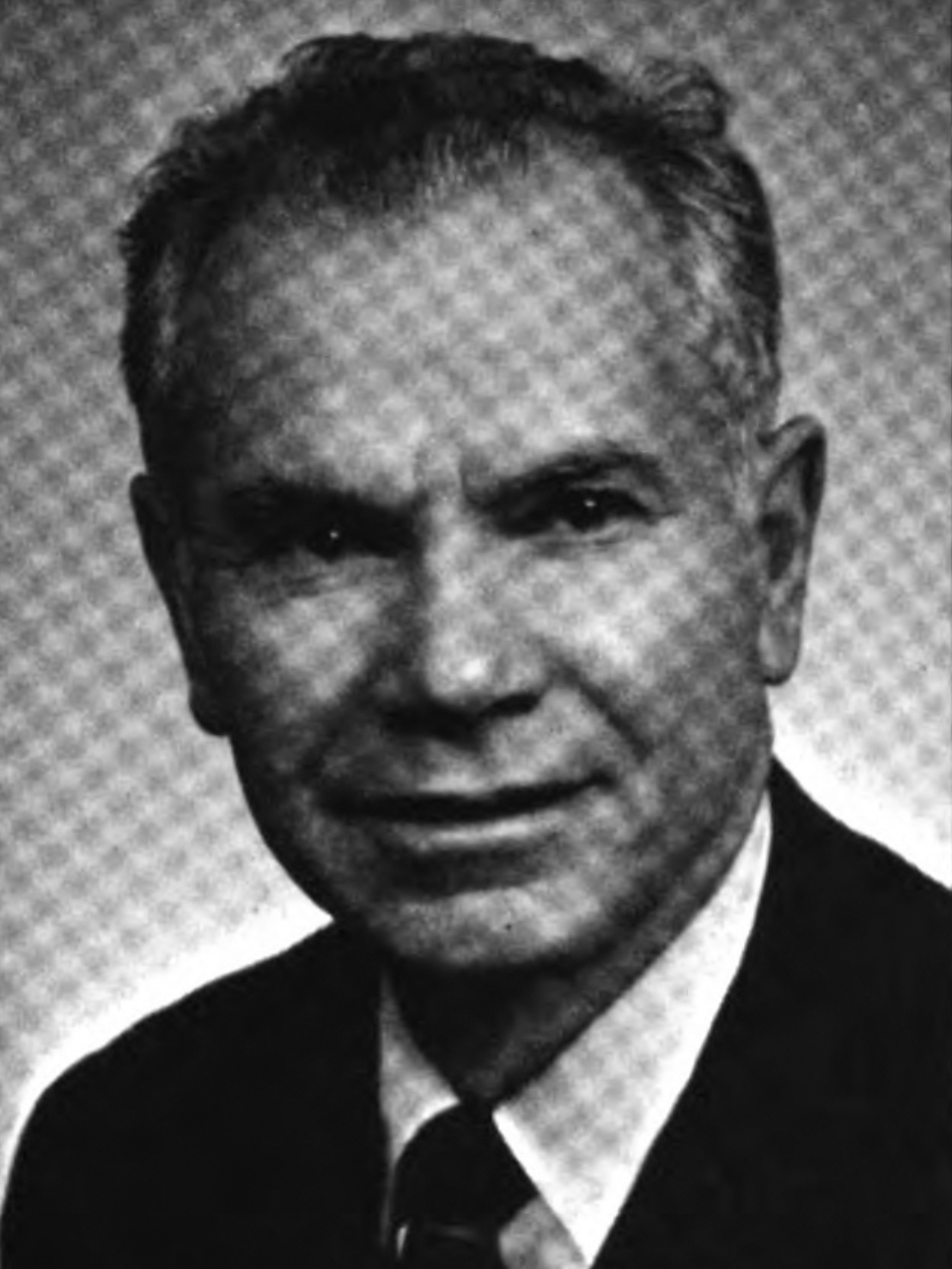
- Official portrait, 1975

Member of the California State Senate
- In office January 5, 1959 – November 30, 1980
- Preceded by: Earl D. Desmond
- Succeeded by: John T. Doolittle
- Constituency: 19th district (1959–1967); 5th district (1967–1976); 3rd district (1976–1980)

Personal details
- Born: July 23, 1912 Sacramento, California, U.S.
- Died: April 3, 2010 (aged 97) Sacramento, California, U.S.
- Party: Democratic
- Spouse: Clarice Horgan (m. 1941)
- Children: 3
- Education: Stanford University

Military service
- Branch/service: United States Navy
- Battles/wars: World War II

Albert S. Rodda Jr. (July 23, 1912 – April 3, 2010) was a California State Senator.

== Early life and education ==
Born in Sacramento, California, Rodda graduated from Sacramento High School in 1929 before receiving an A.B. in 1933 and an A.M. in 1934, both in history, from Stanford University, where he was a member of Phi Beta Kappa society. After teaching for several years in Sacramento high schools, Rodda entered the United States Navy Reserve and was a gunnery officer in World War II. Leaving the Navy Reserve in 1946, he started teaching at Sacramento City College. In 1951, Rodda received a Ph.D. in history and economics from Stanford.

== Political career ==
A Democrat, Rodda won a 1958 special election to the California State Senate to represent the 19th District to fill the vacancy created by the death of Earl D. Desmond, defeating Desmond's son and two other Democrats. He was re-elected six times but was defeated in 1980 in an upset by a newcomer, John Doolittle.

Rodda's best-known legislative legacy is SB 160, enacted in 1975 and taking effect in 1976, which established collective bargaining for California's public school teachers.

In 1980, the Los Rios Community College District board of trustees named a new administrative-classroom complex at Sacramento City College as Rodda Hall. Shortly after Rodda's departure from the Senate, California State Treasurer Jesse M. Unruh appointed him Executive Secretary of the Commission on State Finance. In 1983, Rodda left the commission and was elected to the Los Rios Community College District board, where he served until 1992.

== Personal life ==
Rodda met Clarice Horgan, an English teacher, when they both taught at Grant Union High School. They married in 1941 and had one son and two daughters.

California Senate
Preceded by Earl D. Desmond	California State Senator; 19th District; January 5, 1959 – January 2, 1967	Succeeded by H. L. Richardson
Preceded by Fred W. Marler, Jr.	California State Senator; 5th District; January 2, 1967 – November 30, 1976	Succeeded by Milton Marks
Preceded by Clare Berryhill	California State Senator; 3rd District; December 6, 1976 – November 30, 1980	Succeeded by John Doolittle
