= Greg Aghazarian =

American lawyer and politician

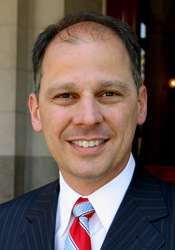

Deputy Secretary for Legislation of the California Department of Food and Agriculture
- In office April 2010 – January 2011
- Appointed by: Arnold Schwarzenegger
- Preceded by: Rayne Pegg

Commissioner of the California Workers' Compensation Appeals Board
- In office January 2009 – January 2010
- Appointed by: Arnold Schwarzenegger

Member of the California State Assembly from the 26th district
- In office December 2, 2002 – November 30, 2008
- Preceded by: Dennis Cardoza
- Succeeded by: Bill Berryhill

Personal details
- Born: Gregory George Aghazarian; September 10, 1964 (age 62) Stockton, California
- Party: Republican
- Spouse: Esther Amelia Aghazarian
- Children: 3
- Education: University of Southern California (BA); University of the Pacific (JD)

Gregory George Aghazarian (born September 10, 1964) is an American lawyer and politician from California. He is a Republican and former California State Assemblyman who represented the 26th district from 2002 until 2008.

Prior to his election, Aghazarian was a local businessman and attorney, working for his family's business, Aghazarian's of Stockton, which has been in Stockton for more than three decades. He was also an elected member of the Lincoln Unified School District Board of Trustees from 1998 to 2002, serving as president of the board for the 2001-02 year.

Assemblyman Aghazarian briefly considered running against freshman Democratic Congressman Jerry McNerney in 2008; however, Aghazarian instead decided to pursue a run for the State Senate in the 5th district, which is one of the few competitive Senate seats in California. He was defeated by Assemblywoman Lois Wolk.

One of the laws introduced by Assembly Member Aghazarian was permitting transport agencies to also obtain Disabled access license plates (AB 1910, Ch 203, Sections 5007 and 22511.56 of the California Vehicle Code). This new law which was "sponsored" (or "suggested") by Manteca CAPS' Executive Director Emmanuel Serriere went into effect on January 1, 2007. It was explained at length in his regular bulletin The Aghazarian Alert.

In 2009 he was appointed to the California Workers' Compensation Appeals Board by Governor Arnold Schwarzenegger and served on the board until 2010. In 2010 Governor Schwarzenegger appointed him as Deputy Secretary for Legislation at the California Department of Food and Agriculture and served in that position until 2011.

A graduate of the University of Southern California and the University of the Pacific, McGeorge School of Law, Aghazarian lives in Stockton with his wife, Esther, and their three sons: Ben, Max and Sam.

Preceded by Dennis Cardoza	California State Assemblyman; 26th District; December 2, 2002–November 30, 2008	Succeeded by Bill Berryhill
