= California's 17th State Assembly district =

American legislative district

Current assemblymember
Matt Haney; D–San Francisco
- Population (2020) • Voting age • Citizen voting age: 518,498; 453,436; 362,292
- Demographics: 35.87% White; 6.95% Black; 18.93% Latino; 31.84% Asian; 0.23% Native American; 0.51% Hawaiian/Pacific Islander; 0.71% other; 4.96% remainder of multiracial
- Registered voters: 298,276
- Registration: 59.23% Democratic; 4.93% Republican; 31.89% No party preference

California's 17th State Assembly district is one of 80 California State Assembly districts. It is currently represented by Democrat Matt Haney of San Francisco.

== District profile ==
The district encompasses the eastern portions of the consolidated city-county of San Francisco, including its central financial and governmental core as well as several of the more working-class neighborhoods of the city.

San Francisco – (59.26%)

== Election results from statewide races ==
Year	Office	Results
2022	Governor	Newsom 87.7 – 12.3%
2022	Senator	Padilla 88 – 12%
2021	Recall	No 88.6 – 11.4%
2020	President	Biden 87.5 – 10.4%
2018	Governor	Newsom 89.5 – 10.5%
2018	Senator	Feinstein 63.1 – 36.9%
2016	President	Clinton 88.1 – 7.0%
2016	Senator	Harris 79.2 – 20.8%
2014	Governor	Brown 91.0 – 9.0%
2012	President	Obama 87.0 – 9.3%
2012	Senator	Feinstein 90.8 – 9.2%

== List of assembly members representing the district ==
Due to redistricting, the 17th district has been moved around different parts of the state. The current iteration resulted from the 2021 redistricting by the California Citizens Redistricting Commission.

Assembly members	Party	Years served	Counties represented	Notes
E. H. Watson	Democratic	January 5, 1885 – January 3, 1887	El Dorado	
Henry Mahler	Democratic	January 3, 1887 – January 5, 1891	El Dorado	
W. E. Baughman	Republican	January 5, 1891 – January 2, 1893	El Dorado	
James C. Sims	Democratic	January 2, 1893 – January 7, 1895	Sonoma	
W. S. Staley	Republican	January 7, 1895 – January 4, 1897	Sonoma	
John W. Keegan	Democratic	January 4, 1897 – January 2, 1899	Sonoma	
William F. Cowan	Democratic	January 2, 1899 – January 5, 1903	Sonoma	
Grove L. Johnson	Republican	January 5, 1903 – January 2, 1905	Sacramento	
Charles O. Busick	Republican	January 2, 1905 – January 7, 1907	Sacramento	
Grove L. Johnson	Republican	January 7, 1907 – January 2, 1911	Sacramento	
Charles A. Bliss	Republican	January 2, 1911 – January 6, 1913	Sacramento	
Charles W. Byrnes	Republican	January 6, 1913 – January 4, 1915	Marin	
James E. Manning	Republican	January 4, 1915 – January 8, 1923	Marin	
Charles F. Reindollar	Republican	January 8, 1923 – January 5, 1931	Marin	
Clarence Ray Robinson	Republican	January 5, 1931 – January 2, 1933	Madera, Mariposa, Merced	
Henry P. Meehan	Democratic	January 2, 1933 – January 4, 1943	Alameda	
Edward J. Carey	Republican	January 4, 1943 – January 3, 1949	Alameda	
William Byron Rumford	Democratic	January 3, 1949 – January 2, 1967	Alameda	
John J. Miller	Democratic	January 2, 1967 – November 30, 1974	Alameda	
Willie Brown	Democratic	December 2, 1974 – November 30, 1992	San Francisco	
Dean Andal	Republican	December 7, 1992 – November 30, 1994	San Joaquin	
Michael Machado	Democratic	December 5, 1994 – November 30, 2000	San Joaquin	Survived recall attempt in 1995.
Barbara S. Matthews	Democratic	December 4, 2000 – November 30, 2006	San Joaquin	
Cathleen Galgiani	Democratic	December 4, 2006 – November 30, 2012	Merced, San Joaquin, Stanislaus	
Tom Ammiano	Democratic	December 3, 2012 – November 30, 2014	San Francisco	
David Chiu	Democratic	December 1, 2014 – October 31, 2021	San Francisco	Resigned to become City Attorney of San Francisco.
Vacant		October 31, 2021 – May 3, 2022	San Francisco	
Matt Haney	Democratic	May 3, 2022 – present	San Francisco	

== Election results (1990–present) ==
=== 2024 ===
2024 California State Assembly 17th district election
Primary election
Party	Candidate	Votes	%
Democratic	Matt Haney (incumbent)	90,915	81.9
Republican	Manuel Noris-Barrera	13,843	12.5
Democratic	Otto Duke	6,245	5.6
Total votes		111,003	100.0
General election
Democratic	Matt Haney (incumbent)	169,490	84.6
Republican	Manuel Noris-Barrera	30,900	15.4
Total votes		200,390	100.0
Democratic hold			

=== 2022 ===
2022 California State Assembly 17th district election
Primary election
Party	Candidate	Votes	%
Democratic	Matt Haney (incumbent)	69,412	63.2
Democratic	David Campos	27,270	24.8
Republican	Bill Shireman	13,071	11.9
Total votes		109,753	100.0
General election
Democratic	Matt Haney (incumbent)	101,891	69.1
Democratic	David Campos	45,470	30.9
Total votes		147,361	100.0
Democratic hold			

=== 2022 (special) ===
2022 California State Assembly 17th district special election Vacancy resulting from the resignation of David Chiu
Primary election
Party	Candidate	Votes	%
Democratic	Matt Haney	34,174	36.4
Democratic	David Campos	33,448	35.7
Democratic	Bilal Mahmood	20,895	22.3
Democratic	Thea Selby	5,261	5.6
Total votes		93,778	100.0
General election
Democratic	Matt Haney	48,762	62.4
Democratic	David Campos	29,422	37.6
Total votes		78,184	100.0
Democratic hold			

=== 2020 ===
2020 California State Assembly 17th district election
Primary election
Party	Candidate	Votes	%
Democratic	David Chiu (incumbent)	120,498	100.0
Libertarian	Starchild (write in)	56	0.0
Total votes		120,554	100.0
General election
Democratic	David Chiu (incumbent)	190,731	88.9
Libertarian	Starchild	23,834	11.1
Total votes		214,565	100.0
Democratic hold			

=== 2018 ===
2018 California State Assembly 17th district election
Primary election
Party	Candidate	Votes	%
Democratic	David Chiu (incumbent)	93,212	81.9
Democratic	Alejandro Fernandez	20,639	18.1
Total votes		113,851	100.0
General election
Democratic	David Chiu (incumbent)	140,381	75.5
Democratic	Alejandro Fernandez	45,483	24.5
Total votes		185,864	100.0
Democratic hold			

=== 2016 ===
2016 California State Assembly 17th district election
Primary election
Party	Candidate	Votes	%
Democratic	David Chiu (incumbent)	114,904	88.5
Republican	Matthew Del Carlo	14,891	11.5
Total votes		129,795	100.0
General election
Democratic	David Chiu (incumbent)	172,153	86.3
Republican	Matthew Del Carlo	27,417	13.7
Total votes		199,570	100.0
Democratic hold			

=== 2014 ===
2014 California State Assembly 17th district election
Primary election
Party	Candidate	Votes	%
Democratic	David Chiu	34,863	48.0
Democratic	David Campos	31,951	44.0
Republican	David Carlos Salaverry	5,843	8.0
Total votes		72,657	100.0
General election
Democratic	David Chiu	63,041	51.1
Democratic	David Campos	60,416	48.9
Total votes		123,457	100.0
Democratic hold			

=== 2012 ===
2012 California State Assembly 17th district election
Primary election
Party	Candidate	Votes	%
Democratic	Tom Ammiano (incumbent)	63,454	84.2
Republican	Jason P. Clark	11,933	15.8
Total votes		75,387	100.0
General election
Democratic	Tom Ammiano (incumbent)	161,124	86.2
Republican	Jason P. Clark	25,728	13.8
Total votes		186,852	100.0
Democratic hold			

=== 2010 ===
2010 California State Assembly 17th district election
Party	Candidate	Votes	%
Democratic	Cathleen Galgiani (incumbent)	52,219	58.4
Republican	Jack Mobley	37,293	41.6
Total votes		89,512	100.0
Democratic hold			

=== 2008 ===
2008 California State Assembly 17th district election
Party	Candidate	Votes	%
Democratic	Cathleen Galgiani (incumbent)	77,525	66.3
Republican	Jack Mobley	39,480	33.7
Total votes		117,005	100.0
Democratic hold			

=== 2006 ===
2006 California State Assembly 17th district election
Party	Candidate	Votes	%
Democratic	Cathleen Galgiani	47,675	59.8
Republican	Gerald Machado	32,107	40.2
Total votes		79,782	100.0
Democratic hold			

=== 2004 ===
2004 California State Assembly 17th district election
Party	Candidate	Votes	%
Democratic	Barbara S. Matthews (incumbent)	66,926	60.5
Republican	Nellie McGarry	43,664	39.5
No party	Jennet C. Stebbins (write-in)	2	0.0
Total votes		110,592	100.0
Democratic hold			

=== 2002 ===
2002 California State Assembly 17th district election
Party	Candidate	Votes	%
Democratic	Barbara S. Matthews (incumbent)	42,504	56.5
Republican	Brian McCabe	32,726	43.5
Total votes		75,230	100.0
Democratic hold			

=== 2000 ===
2000 California State Assembly 17th district election
Party	Candidate	Votes	%
Democratic	Barbara S. Matthews	64,361	53.0
Republican	Greg Aghazarian	54,031	44.5
Libertarian	Roy W. Busch	2,943	2.4
Total votes		121,335	100.0
Democratic hold			

=== 1998 ===
1998 California State Assembly 17th district election
Party	Candidate	Votes	%
Democratic	Michael Machado (incumbent)	61,556	68.9
Republican	Jay Smart	27,794	31.1
Total votes		89,350	100.0
Democratic hold			

=== 1996 ===
1996 California State Assembly 17th district election
Party	Candidate	Votes	%
Democratic	Michael Machado (incumbent)	54,607	51.9
Republican	Kevin Minnick	46,997	44.7
Libertarian	Tom Kohlheep	3,517	3.3
Total votes		105,121	100.0
Democratic hold			

=== 1995 (recall) ===
1995 California State Assembly 67th district special recall election
Choice	Votes	%
For	19,631	37.02
Against	33,390	62.98
Total	53,021	100.00

1995 California State Assembly 67th district special recall election Successor of Michael Machado if a majority vote in favor of recall
Party	Candidate	Votes	%
Republican	Ed Simas	17,414	48.6
Democratic	Wayne Flores	11,470	32.0
Republican	Carole Smith	5,740	16.0
Libertarian	Tom Kohlhepp	1,198	3.3
Total votes		35,822	100.0
Republican hold			

=== 1994 ===
1994 California State Assembly 17th district election
Party	Candidate	Votes	%
Democratic	Michael Machado	45,710	50.8
Republican	Ed Simas	44,316	49.2
Total votes		90,026	100.0
Democratic gain from Republican			

=== 1992 ===
1992 California State Assembly 17th district election
Party	Candidate	Votes	%
Republican	Dean Andal (incumbent)	59,165	50.6
Democratic	Michael Machado	57,697	49.4
Total votes		116,862	100.0
Republican gain from Democratic			

=== 1990 ===
1990 California State Assembly 17th district election
Party	Candidate	Votes	%
Democratic	Willie Brown (incumbent)	62,951	64.2
Republican	Terrence Faulkner	26,572	27.1
Libertarian	John Whisman	8,537	8.7
Total votes		98,060	100.0
Democratic hold			

== See also ==
- California State Assembly
- California State Assembly districts
- Districts in California
