= Susan Eggman =

American politician (born 1961)

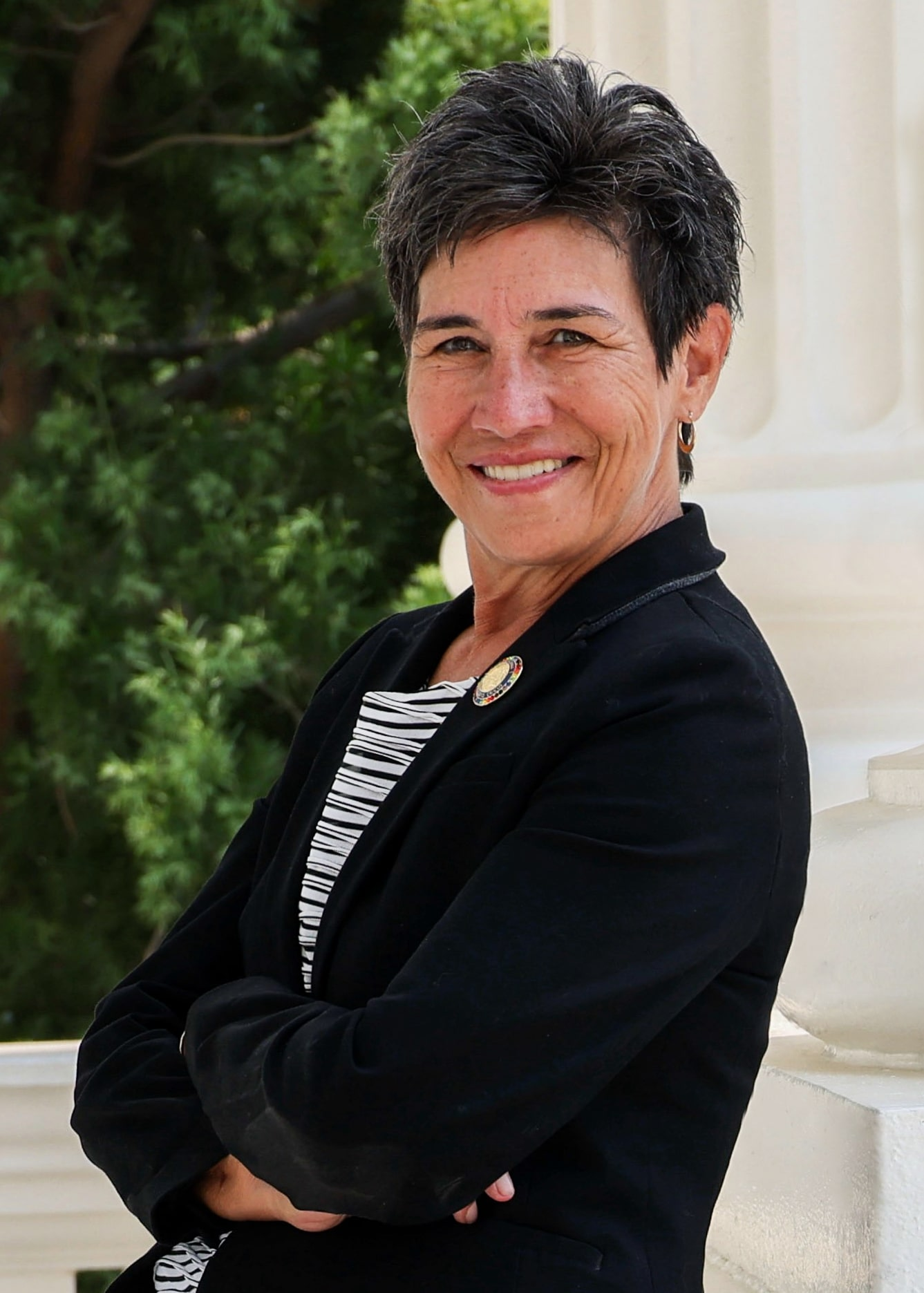

Member of the California State Senate from the 5th district
- In office December 7, 2020 – November 30, 2024
- Preceded by: Cathleen Galgiani
- Succeeded by: Jerry McNerney

Member of the California State Assembly from the 13th district
- In office December 3, 2012 – November 30, 2020
- Preceded by: Tom Ammiano
- Succeeded by: Carlos Villapudua

Personal details
- Born: March 3, 1961 (age 65) Castro Valley, California, U.S.
- Party: Democratic
- Spouse: Renee Hall
- Education: California State University, Stanislaus (BS, MSW); Portland State University (PhD)
- Occupation: Social worker Professor
- Website: sd05.senate.ca.gov

Military service
- Branch/service: United States Army
- Years of service: 1979–1983

Susan Talamantes Eggman (born March 3, 1961) is an American politician who served in the California State Senate from 2020 to 2024. A member of the Democratic Party, she represented the 5th Senate district, which encompasses western San Joaquin County; from January 19, 2022, she served as Assistant Majority Leader.

Prior to being elected to the Senate in 2020, she was a member of the California State Assembly representing the 13th Assembly District as well as being a Stockton City Councilwoman and Associate Professor of social work at California State University, Sacramento.

Eggman, a lesbian, was a member and past chair of the California Legislative LGBT Caucus. She was also a member of the California Latino Legislative Caucus.

Laws she has written include the law establishing the California Solar on Multifamily Affordable Housing Program, the End of Life Option Act, and the law establishing the National Guard’s Discovery Challenge Academy in French Camp.

== Biography ==
Susan C. Eggman was born 3 March 1961, in Alameda County, California, Talamantes is her mother's maiden name. Her brother Michael ran in the primary, for California's 10th congressional district, on June 5, 2018.

Eggman grew up in Stanislaus County and graduated from Turlock High School in 1979. After graduation, she enlisted in the U.S. Army, where she served four years from 1979 to 1983 as a medic at the Fort Meade army hospital, Maryland. After the military, she attended California State University, Stanislaus, where she earned both a bachelor's degree in psychology and a master of social work. She later earned a Ph.D. in social work from Portland State University.

== Elections ==
=== 2012 California State Assembly ===
California State Assembly election, 2012
Primary election
Party	Candidate	Votes	%
Democratic	Susan Eggman	21,066	39.8
Republican	K. "Jeffrey" Jafri	11,480	21.7
Republican	Dolores Cooper	7,892	14.9
Democratic	C. Jennet Stebbins	6,792	12.8
Democratic	Xochitl Raya Paderes	5,649	10.7
Total votes		52,879	100.0
General election
Democratic	Susan Eggman	78,776	65.4
Republican	K. "Jeffrey" Jafri	41,595	34.6
Total votes		120,371	100.0
Democratic hold			

=== 2014 California State Assembly ===
California's 13th State Assembly district election, 2014
Primary election
Party	Candidate	Votes	%
Democratic	Susan Eggman (incumbent)	22,341	49.7
Republican	Sol Jobrack	14,318	31.8
Democratic	Catherine Jennet Stebbins	8,297	18.5
Total votes		44,956	100.0
General election
Democratic	Susan Eggman (incumbent)	40,635	60.7
Republican	Sol Jobrack	26,254	39.3
Total votes		66,889	100.0
Democratic hold			

=== 2016 California State Assembly ===
California's 13th State Assembly district election, 2016
Primary election
Party	Candidate	Votes	%
Democratic	Susan Eggman (incumbent)	39,608	53.4
Republican	Kevin J. Lincoln, II	14,284	19.3
Democratic	K. Jeffrey Jafri	11,728	15.8
Republican	Jacob "Jake" Souza	8,491	11.5
Total votes		74,111	100.0
General election
Democratic	Susan Eggman (incumbent)	86,315	64.8
Republican	Kevin J. Lincoln, II	46,883	35.2
Total votes		133,198	100.0
Democratic hold			

=== 2018 California State Assembly ===
California's 13th State Assembly district election, 2018
Primary election
Party	Candidate	Votes	%
Democratic	Susan Eggman (incumbent)	30,826	52.6
Republican	Antonio M. Garcia	17,885	30.5
Democratic	Carlos Villapudua	9,888	16.9
Total votes		58,599	100.0
General election
Democratic	Susan Eggman (incumbent)	74,813	65.4
Republican	Antonio M. Garcia	39,532	34.6
Total votes		114,345	100.0
Democratic hold			

=== California State Senate candidacy ===
On May 19, 2019, Eggman announced that she would be a candidate for the California State Senate in California's 5th State Senate district in 2020. Incumbent state Senator Cathleen Galgiani was not eligible for reelection due to term limits.
