= Thomas McCormack (California politician) =

American politician

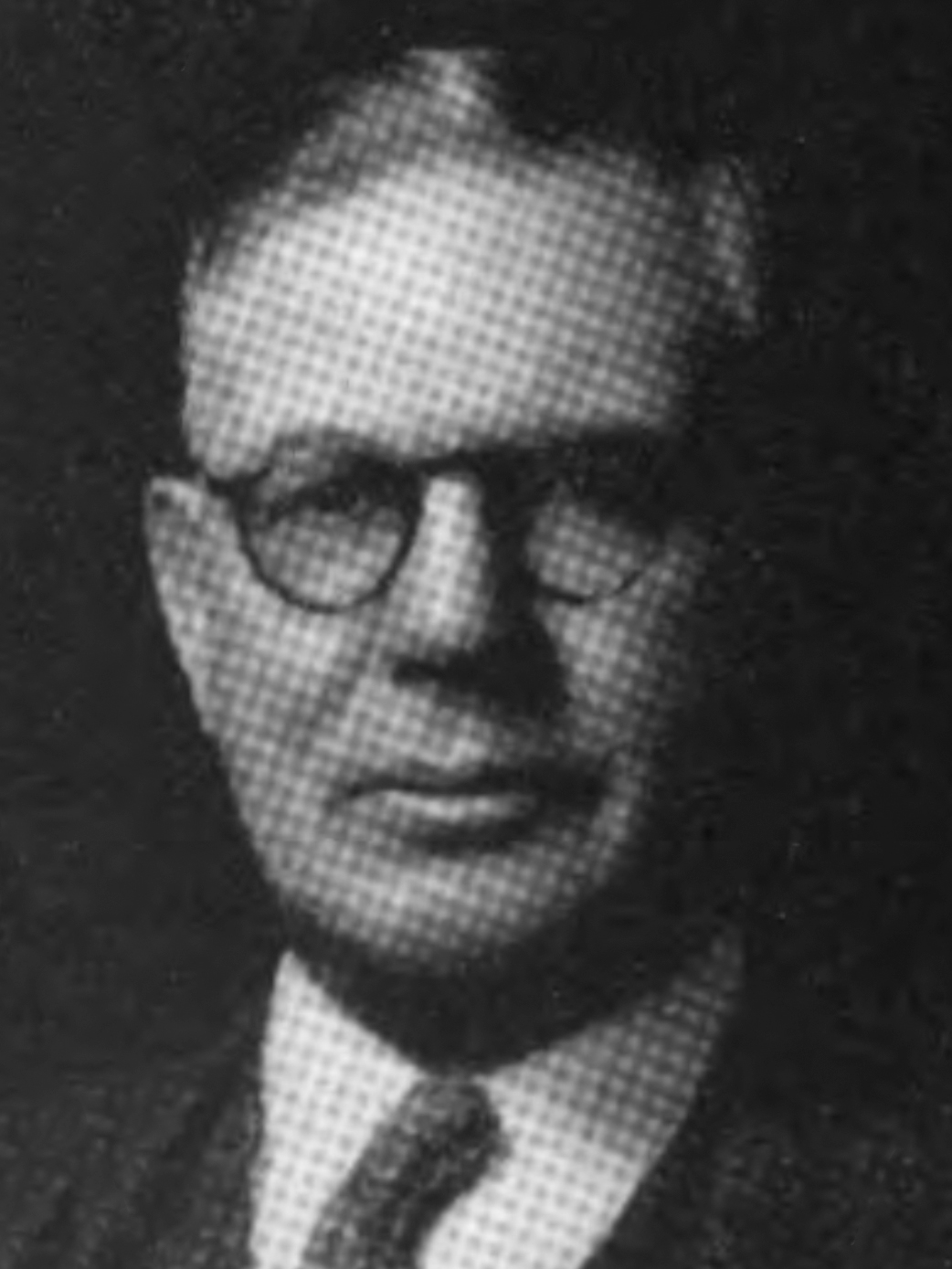

Member of the California Senate from the 15th district
- In office January 2, 1933 – January 3, 1949
- Preceded by: Arthur H. Breed Sr.
- Succeeded by: Luther E. Gibson

Member of the California Senate from the 5th district
- In office January 7, 1929 – January 2, 1933
- Preceded by: Benjamin F. Rush
- Succeeded by: John B. McColl

Personal details
- Born: February 21, 1873 New Brunswick, Canada
- Died: August 17, 1949 (aged 76)
- Party: Republican

Thomas McCormack (February 21, 1873 – August 17, 1949) was a lawmaker from California who served in the California State Senate for the 5th district from 1929 to 1933 and the 15th district from 1933 to 1949. He was born in Canada.
