= Jim Lawrence =

Jim Lawrence may refer to:

== Sports ==
- Jim Lawrence (baseball) (born 1939), Canadian baseball player
- Jimmy Lawrence (American football) (1913–1990), American football and baseball player
- Jimmy Lawrence (1885–1934), Scottish footballer
- Jimmy Lawrence (footballer, born 1891) (1891–1970), English footballer

== Others ==
- Jim Lawrence (politician), American politician
- James Duncan Lawrence (author) (1918–1994), American author, best known as Jim Lawrence

== See also ==
- James Lawrence (disambiguation)
