= Emmanuel Serriere =

Educator and administrator

Emmanuel Serrière is an educator, administrator, and advocate for people with developmental disabilities, researcher on autism.

== L'Arche and Jean Vanier ==
Serrière has been instrumental his entire forty five-year career in helping adults with developmental disabilities in California to have a more normalized life according to their choices in their own community. One of his first important contacts was with Jean Vanier in Trosly Breuil where he was employed from February to July 1965 to help create l'Arche in that small village North of Paris. Serrière immigrated to the United States from France in 1968 became a US citizen in 1974 and got married in June 1976 in Saratoga, California. He obtained a master's degree in Rehabilitation Administration from the University of San Francisco and subsequently became executive director of various California non-profit agencies in Northern California most of which deal with adults with developmental disabilities. He based his entire career on the philosophy broadly borrowed from his mentor Jean Vanier: providing people-centered services, empowering them to achieve their full potential and beyond, and maximizing their quality of life according to their choices. In 1986, Serrière was appointed Calaveras County Mental Health Administrator where he worked for seven years. He belongs, thru his mother, to the same old French family that Jean-Pierre Desthuilliers.

== Autism ==
As part of his Master's thesis, Serrière did some research on autism, studying three specific cases and the insertion of these three individuals with the general population of people with developmental disabilities. He worked with Dr. Bernard Rimland, Director of the Autism Research Institute. Serrière is convinced that the diagnosis of autism should not have been altered to include the word "spectrum" to its name "autism spectrum" as it now became a catch-all for all troubled children including misbehaving and attention deficit. To respond to numerous friends and parents who approached him looking for a three-minute diagnosis of their sons or daughters, Serriere generalize by sharing his beliefs that there is no Autism or Asperger syndrome or Kanner syndrome without specific visible traits: the person affected with autism is in their own world without eye contact or paying attention to the other person. They resent being touched, even a handshake. They will often keep busy by tapping fingers on own face, a colorful toy, a window and seeming to pay deep attention to the rhythm and the sensation received from this patter. They might spin plates or doing excessive and very repetitive movement including jumping on a trampoline for hours. Of course, there are also the "Autistic Savants" or savantism who will excel in math, drawing, music, memory exercise such a retaining an entire piano concerto, the decimals of 3 over 14, the view of a details of a building, dates past and future, etc. Serrière still believes that Dr. Rimland's long qualifying (500 questions) questionnaire should be the only basis for defining autism.

== Work with California legislators ==
Serriere was instrumental in introducing two major California laws, one in 1978 with Senator Roberti clearly mandating that developmentally disabled people have the right to live in the community: SB 2093, introduced by Senator Roberti in 1978 requires that residential programs for 6 or fewer persons be treated and considered like any other family residence. Once the law passed, Serriere edited and published a booklet distributed widely to about one hundred service clubs of the Bay Area explaining why people with developmental disabilities can make good neighbors.

The other was in 2006 with Assembly member Greg Aghazarian permitting transport agencies to obtain Disabled access license plates (AB 1910, Ch 203, Sections 5007 and 22511.56 of the CA Vehicle Code). This new law went into effect on Jan 1, 2007.

His latest involvement helped Manteca CAPS (1995–2008), (called Valley CAPS since July 1, 2010) a day program for adults with Intellectual disability in Central California, from being stagnant and unsuccessful to one of the most successful day program for adults with developmental disabilities. With his progressive Board of Director he was able to increase the services of Manteca CAPS from 50 consumers to over 300 on five campuses increasing staff from 17 to over 115. His achievements were very often covered in the Manteca Bulletin including development of new campuses in Manteca, Lathrop and Modesto.

== Publication ==
New Neighbors (as Editor), a booklet distributed widely to about one hundred service clubs of the Bay Area explaining why people with developmental disabilities can make good neighbors.
