= Earl D. Desmond =

American politician

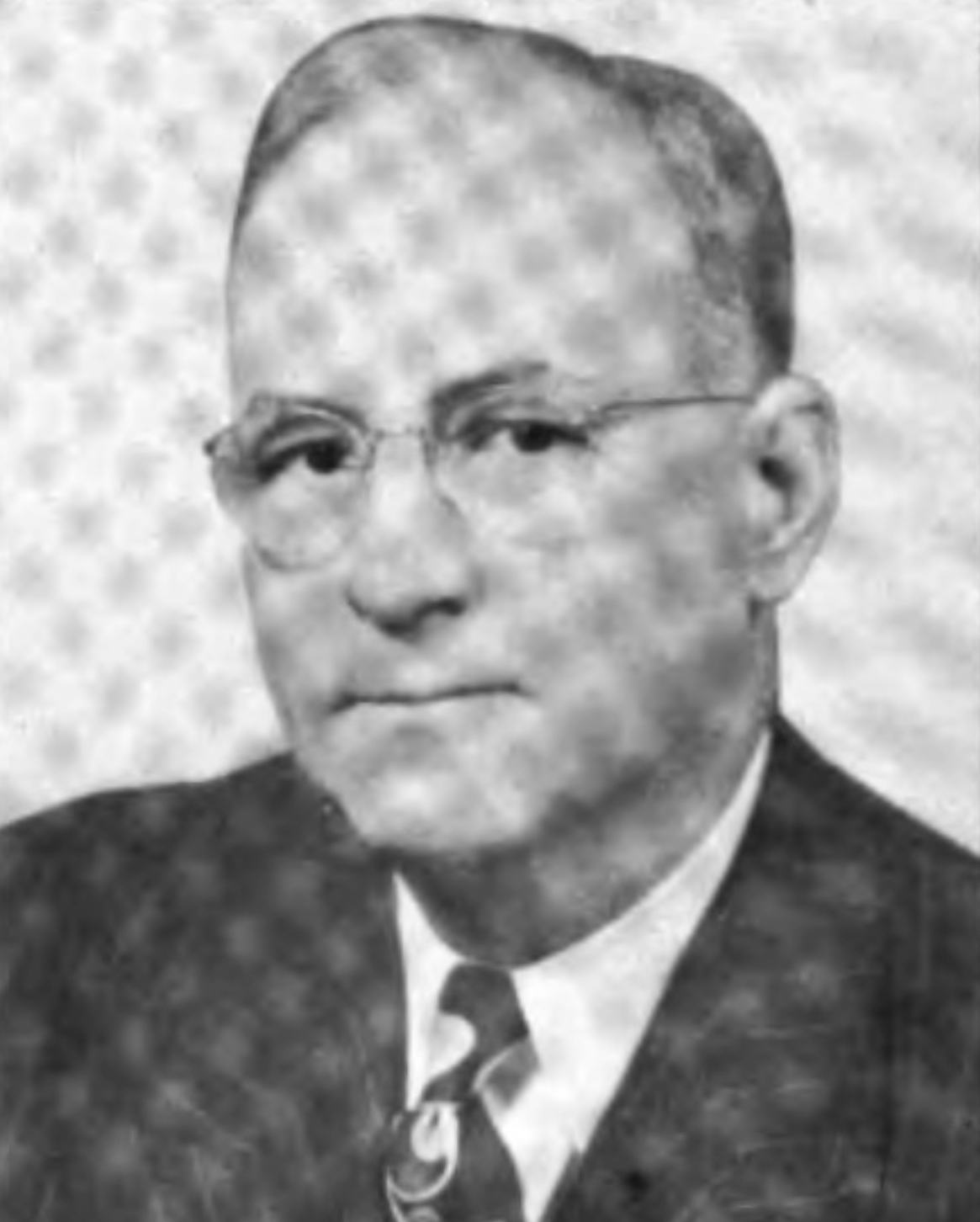
- Official portrait, 1954

Member of the California Senate from the 19th district
- In office January 8, 1945 – May 26, 1958
- Preceded by: John Harold Swan
- Succeeded by: Albert S. Rodda

Member of the California State Assembly from the 9th district
- In office January 7, 1935 – January 8, 1945
- Preceded by: Percy G. West
- Succeeded by: Dwight H. Stephenson

Personal details
- Born: August 26, 1895 Sacramento, California
- Died: May 26, 1958 (aged 62) Sacramento, California
- Party: Democratic
- Spouse: Edna Nicolaus
- Children: 4

Military service
- Branch/service: United States Army
- Battles/wars: World War I

Earl Daniel Desmond (August 26, 1895 – May 26, 1958) was a United States Democratic politician.

Born in Sacramento, California in 1895, Desmond served in the United States Army during World War I. Subsequently, he served as secretary to the Sacramento County Board of Supervisors.

In 1932 Desmond ran for the 9th District seat in the California State Assembly, but lost to Republican incumbent Percy G. West. In 1934, upon West's retirement, Desmond ran for the seat again and defeated the Republican nominee, former Sacramento mayor Claude H.S. Bidwell. Desmond served five terms in the Assembly, and in 1941 was Speaker pro tempore. In 1944 he was elected to the California State Senate from the 19th District. Re-elected in 1948, 1952 and 1956, Desmond was in his fourth Senate term when he died in office.

Desmond is chiefly remembered for his efforts in relation to the establishment of California State University, Sacramento, in 1947. He convinced the Senate's finance committee to withhold funding for the University of California until he had a commitment. Eleven of his own children and grandchildren graduated from the university, which, in recognition of his contribution, named one of its residence halls after him.

He died in Sacramento in 1958, aged 62. His son, Louis N. Desmond (1926-2012), later served as Deputy District Attorney of Sacramento County.
