= Patrick Johnston (American politician) =

American politician (born 1946)

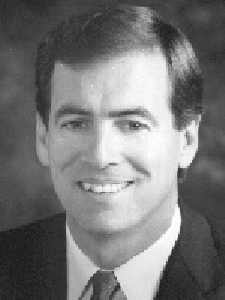

Member of the California Senate from the 5th district
- In office January 10, 1991 – November 30, 2000
- Preceded by: John Garamendi
- Succeeded by: Michael Machado

Member of the California State Assembly from the 26th district
- In office January 5, 1981 – January 10, 1991
- Preceded by: Adrian Fondse
- Succeeded by: Dean Andal

Personal details
- Born: September 3, 1946 (age 79) San Francisco, California, U.S.
- Party: Democratic
- Education: Saint Patrick's Seminary and University (BA); California State University, Sacramento (MA)

Patrick Johnston (born September 3, 1946) is an American politician who served as a member of the California State Assembly from 1981 until 1991 and California State Senate from 1991 until 2000, primarily representing San Joaquin County.

== Early life and education ==
Johnston was born in San Francisco, California. He attended high school at St. Joseph's College in Mountain View, California. He earned a Bachelor of Arts degree from Saint Patrick's Seminary and University, followed by a Master of Arts degree in political representation from California State University, Sacramento.

== Career ==
Johnston began his career as an accident report clerk for the San Francisco Municipal Railway. He then worked as a probation officer in San Francisco and Calaveras County, California. Remaining in Calaveras County, Johnston became active in local Democratic politics, and became friends with John Garamendi. Johnston then met Margaret Mary Nevin, a law student, and moved with her to Stockton, California. After Nevin completed law school, they returned to Calaveras County.

Johnston was a delegate to the 1972 Democratic National Convention, where he cast his vote for George McGovern. After returning from the DNC, Johnston resumed work as a probation officer and later became a reporter for the Calaveras Prospect, Weekly-Citizen and Chronicle. He resigned to serve as campaign manager for John Garamendi's run for California State Assembly. Garamendi was elected, and Johnson served as his chief of staff. Johnston also managed Jerry Brown's Northern California election campaign during the 1978 California gubernatorial election. Garamendi was later elected to the California State Senate, and Johnson resigned as chief of staff to run for the California State Assembly.

Johnston's election to the Assembly occurred after his Republican opponent was declared elected and sworn into office on December 1, 1980, winning by a margin of just 18 votes. Requesting a re-count, Johnston was declared the winner; with the Republicans taking the matter to court, where the case was dismissed. Johnston was sworn into office on January 1, 1981.

Following the 1991 resignation of John Garamendi to become California's first elected Insurance Commissioner, Johnston successfully sought election to the State Senate, defeating Garamendi's wife, Patti Garamendi, in the special election.

Since leaving political office, he has been a healthcare and education consultant. In 2004, Governor Arnold Schwarzenegger appointed Johnston to the California Bay-Delta Authority. In 2009, Johnston was appointed president and chief executive officer of the California Association of Health Plans. Johnston was the first legislator-in-residence at the Institute of Governmental Studies of the University of California, Berkeley.

California Assembly
Preceded by Adrian Fondse	California State Assemblyman; 26th District; 1981–1991	Succeeded by Dean Andal
California Senate
Preceded by John Garamendi	California State Senator; 5th district 1991–2000	Succeeded by Michael Machado
