= Rayne Pegg =

American government official

Administrator of the Agricultural Marketing Service Department of Agriculture
- Incumbent
- Assumed office July 6, 2009
- President: Barack Obama
- Preceded by: Lloyd C. Day

Personal details
- Born: California, United States
- Education: College of Notre Dame of Maryland
- Occupation: Legislative Assistant, Administrator

Rayne Pegg was the Administrator of the Agricultural Marketing Service (AMS) of the Department of Agriculture, and was appointed on July 6, 2009, by Agriculture Secretary Tom Vilsack. In her position, she has the responsibility of overseeing AMS policies and programs. AMS administers programs that facilitate the efficient, fair marketing of U.S. agricultural products, including food, fiber, and specialty crops. She participated in the World Trade Organization and US-Korea FTA negotiations, and was previously appointed to USDA’s Agricultural Trade Advisory Committee on Fruits and Vegetables.

== Biography ==
=== Early career ===
Prior to joining the Farm Bureau, Thompson Pegg worked for three years with the Agricultural Council of California where she served as director of governmental relations. In her tenure with the council, which represents agricultural cooperatives, she handled a variety of issues including labor, taxation and environmental issues before the California legislature. Prior to joining the Council, she worked on communications and business development with an Oregon firm.

=== Legislative career ===
In June 2004, Thompson Pegg joined the California Farm Bureau Federation's National Affairs and Research Division as director of international trade and plant health. She continued the Farm Bureau's strong emphasis on trade issues facing the nation's top farm exporting state and was also responsible for plant health/agricultural chemical matters and horticultural crops. Pegg most recently was Deputy Secretary of Legislation and Policy for the California Department of Food and Agriculture (CDFA). Pegg represented the CDFA before the California legislature, regulating bodies and interested parties on issues that had the potential to affect the Department's programs.

=== Agricultural Marketing Service ===
Agriculture Secretary Tom Vilsack named Rayne Thompson Pegg administrator of the Agricultural Marketing Service on July 6, 2009, succeeding Administrator Lloyd Day. "Rayne's background makes her the ideal person to further the development of programs to ensure efficient, fair marketing of U.S. agricultural products as we work to meet the needs of consumers and industries and provide a safe, sustainable food supply for all Americans," Vilsack said.

=== Personal ===
Thompson Pegg earned her BA in psychology from the College of Notre Dame of Maryland. On a personal level, she is a mother and mentor for Wonder Inc., a support network for foster children.

Political offices
Preceded by Lloyd Day	Administrator of the Agricultural Marketing Service; 2009– Present	Succeeded by Incumbent
