= John B. McColl (California politician) =

American politician

Member of the California Senate from the 5th district
- In office January 2, 1933 – December 19, 1938
- Preceded by: Thomas McCormack
- Succeeded by: Jesse W. Carter

Personal details
- Born: March 20, 1893 Winnipeg, Canada
- Died: December 19, 1938 (aged 45) San Bernardino, California, U.S.
- Party: Republican
- Spouse: Elizabeth

Military service
- Branch/service: United States Army
- Battles/wars: World War I

John B. McColl (March 20, 1893 – December 19, 1938) served in the California State Senate for the 5th from 1933 until his death in 1938. He was born in Canada.

McColl died in a crash car from his injuries.
