= Jeff Miller (California politician) =

American politician

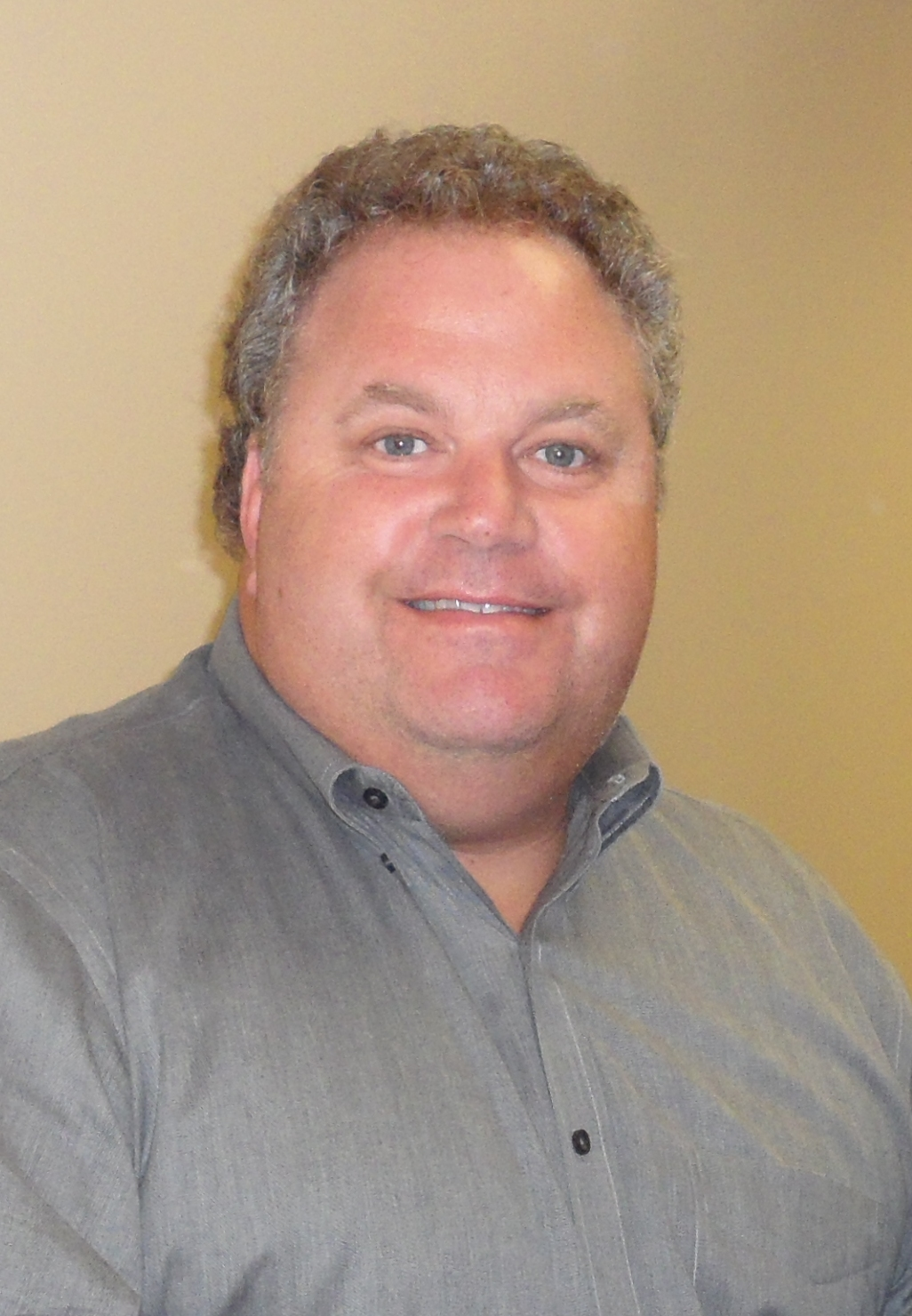

Member of the California State Assembly from the 71st district
- In office December 1, 2008 – November 30, 2012
- Preceded by: Todd Spitzer
- Succeeded by: Brian Jones

Corona City Councilman
- In office December 4, 2000 – December 1, 2008
- Succeeded by: Jason Scott

Personal details
- Born: Jeffrey Michael Miller; September 14, 1963 (age 63) Wakefield, Massachusetts
- Party: Republican
- Spouse: Debora Miller
- Children: 2
- Education: California State University, Fullerton
- Occupation: Small business owner

Jeffrey Michael Miller (born September 14, 1963) is an American politician who served in the California State Assembly. A small business owner, he served 8 years as both the Mayor and a City Councilman in the City of Corona.

== Education ==
Miller graduated from Foothill High School. He received his bachelor's degree from Cal State Fullerton in 1985.

== Political career ==
In 2000, he was elected to the Corona City Council, where his legislative priorities were to keep the economy growing, the budget balanced, the community safe, and reduce regional traffic.

As a member of the Riverside County Transportation Commission, he worked on the Riverside/Orange Corridor Authority.

Miller served as chairman of the Riverside County Republican Party from 2006 to 2008.

== Assembly career ==
Miller served on the Assembly Higher Education Committee as well as the Insurance, Housing and Community Development, and Transportation Committees. In addition, he served as vice-chair of the Environmental Safety and Toxic Materials Committee. In his previous term, Miller sat on the Appropriations, Transportation, Education, and Environmental Safety and Toxic Materials Committees while also serving as the caucus' Elections Chair.

Miller formerly served on the Assembly Ethics Committee. However, during the committee's 1990 investigation of improper activities involving fellow Assemblyman Mike Duvall, tapes surfaced showing Duvall telling Miller details of his sexual liaisons with lobbyists, and Miller was removed from the Committee because he had personal knowledge of the matter being investigated. Miller was reinstated and placed back on the Ethics Committee by Speaker Perez.

In 2012, Miller was the Republican nominee for the California State Senate's 31st Senate District. He lost the general election to Democrat Richard Roth.

=== AB 2098 ===
AB 2098 (which was sponsored by Miller) and its "design build" method could serve as the model for all future road construction projects in California. The California Transportation Commission saw the benefits of the innovative design build method, and decided to unanimously endorse AB 2098. In addition to the California Transportation Commission, AB 2098 garnered 54 bipartisan co-authors in both the State Assembly and the State Senate. Governor Arnold Schwarzenegger signed AB 2098 into law in September 2010.

Miller's work on AB 2098 earned him the award of Legislator of the Year from the Southern California Contractor's Association, as well as recognition from the Orange County Business Council.

== Legislative scorecards ==
California League of Conservation Voters Lifetime score 11% 2012 score 24%

California Teachers Association Progress Report on Legislative Action

- 2011–2012 – F (Below 60%)

California Small Business Association (CSBA) Legislative Report Card

- 2009 – Summa Cum Laude
- 2010 – Magna Cum Laude

National Federation of Independent Business Legislative NFIB Score Card

- 2009 – 100%
- 2010 – 91%

California Chamber of Commerce (CalChamber) Legislative Score Card

- 2009 – 100%
- 2010 – 100%

Greater Riverside Chambers of Commerce Legislator Vote Record

- 2010 – 100%

== Awards ==
- 2009 Legislator of the Year – Western Conservative Political Action Conference
- 2010 Legislator of the Year – Southern California Contractors Association
- 2011 Elected Official of the Year – California Transportation Foundation
- 2011 Commerce Award – Orange Chamber of Commerce
- 2011 Legislator of the Year – California Manufacturers & Tech Association
- 2011 Legislator of the Year – California Chemistry Council
- 2011 Legislator of the Year – Industrial Environmental Association
- 2011 YMCA's Ira D. Calvert Distinguished Service Award

== Election results ==
2010 General, California State Assembly (AD 71)

- Jeff Miller (R), 66.2%
- Gary Kephart (D) 33.8%

2008 General, California State Assembly (AD 71)

- Jeff Miller (R), 100%

2008 Primary, California State Assembly (AD 71)

- Jeff Miller (R), 56.7%
- Neil Blais, (R), 43.3%
