= James Lawrence (Wellington cricketer) =

New Zealand cricketer

Personal information
- Born: 1849; Surrey, England
- Died: 2 October 1898 (aged 48–49); Wellington, New Zealand

Domestic team information
- Years: Team
- 1873/74: Wellington
- Source: Cricinfo, 24 October 2020

James Lawrence (1849 – 2 October 1898) was a New Zealand cricketer. He played in one first-class match for Wellington during the 1873–74 season.

Lawrence was born in the English county of Surrey in 1849. In New Zealand he worked as a fireman for a gas company in Wellington. He appeared in his only first-class match, a March 1874 fixture against Nelson, as a full substitute for Francis Bell, batting only in Wellington's second innings during which he scored a single run.

Lawrence died in March 1936 as the result of a collision with a steam-roller which had occurred 18 months previously.
