= Bill Berryhill =

American farmer and politician

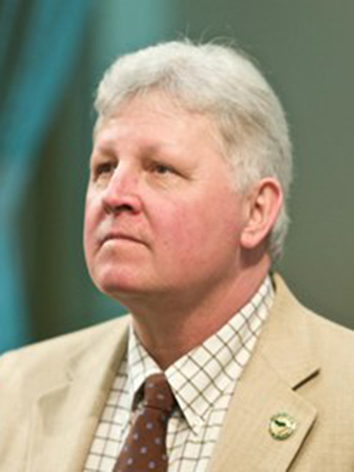

Member of the California State Assembly from the 26th district
- In office December 1, 2008 – November 30, 2012
- Preceded by: Greg Aghazarian
- Succeeded by: Adam Gray (redistricted to 21st)

Personal details
- Born: William Ronald Berryhill; March 18, 1958 (age 68) Ceres, California
- Party: Republican
- Spouse: Triana Berryhill
- Relations: Clare Berryhill (father); Tom Berryhill (brother); Mike Berryhill (cousin)
- Education: Butte College
- Profession: Farmer

William Ronald Berryhill (born March 18, 1958) is an American farmer and politician.

He represented the 26th district in the California State Assembly, encompassing parts of California's Central Valley.

In 2008, he was in a tight race for State Senator from the 5th District, when his brother Assemblyman Tom Berryhill (R) transferred $40,000 to Bill's campaign by passing it through two different Republican campaign committees in order to circumvent state campaign fund regulations. Bill R. Berryhill and his brother were both found guilty and fined $40,000.

In 2012, he was the Republican nominee for the California state Senate, when he again challenged Democrat Cathleen Galgiani. He lost by a 51% to 49% margin. He lives in Stockton with his wife Triana and his three children.

The Berryhills are a prominent Republican political family in California. Bill's father, the late Clare Berryhill, served in both houses of the State Legislature, and also served as director of the California Department of Food and Agriculture.

His brother, Tom, served in the Assembly for the neighboring 25th district from 2006 to 2010 and served in the State Senate from 2010 to 2018. The Berryhills were the first brothers to serve concurrently in the California Legislature in almost 60 years.

His first cousin Mike Berryhill was the 2010 Republican nominee for California's 18th congressional district.
