= Richard Roth (politician) =

American politician

Richard D. Roth
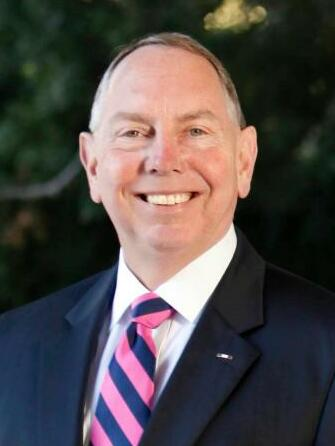
- Official portrait, 2013

Member of the California Senate from the 31st district
- In office December 3, 2012 – November 30, 2024
- Preceded by: Robert Dutton
- Succeeded by: Sabrina Cervantes

Personal details
- Born: November 6, 1950 (age 75) Columbus, Ohio, U.S.
- Party: Democratic
- Spouse: Cindy
- Education: Miami University (BA); Emory University (JD)
- Profession: Attorney
- Website: Official website

Military service
- Branch/service: United States Air Force
- Years of service: 1972–2007
- Rank: Major General

Richard Dale Roth (born November 6, 1950) is an American politician who previously served in the California State Senate from 2012 to 2024. A Democrat, he represented the 31st Senate District, encompassing northwestern Riverside County, including the cities of Corona, Eastvale, Jurupa Valley, Moreno Valley, Norco, Perris, and Riverside.

Prior to being elected to the state senate in 2012, Roth served as a major general in the United States Air Force, and as a practicing attorney.

== Early life ==
Roth was born on November 6, 1950, in Columbus, Ohio, and graduated from Ada High School (Ada, Ohio) in 1968, where he played in the band and was elected president of his junior class and the student council. He went on to Miami University (Ohio), majored in political science, minored in chemistry and enlisted in the ROTC program. After a less-than-perfect eye exam kept him from flight school, Roth set his sights on the Air Force Judge Advocate General's Corps (JAG) and earned his J.D. degree from Emory University in 1974.

== Air Force career ==
After earning admission into the JAG Corps, Roth entered active duty in the U.S. Air Force in 1975. He served various postings with the Strategic Air Command and Pacific Air Forces units in Arizona, Okinawa, Japan and California. Roth became a resident of Riverside in 1978, when he was assigned to Riverside's 22nd Bomb Wing at March Air Force Base.

Transferring from active duty to the Air Force Reserves in 1979, he served at March AFB over the next 13 years with Strategic Air Command and Military Airlift Command units. During this period, he was named Air Force Judge Advocate of the Year (1986) and California Air Force Reserve Officer of the Year (1992).

Through the 1990s and early 2000s, Roth worked as a reserve judge advocate at Air Force bases in Georgia, California, and Illinois. He also served at Headquarters Air Force Reserve Command and in the Pentagon. By 2004, he had risen to the rank of major general and served in the Pentagon as mobilization assistant to The Judge Advocate General of the U.S. Air Force, where he oversaw more than 900 Reserve judge advocates and paralegals assigned to more than 200 offices at every level of command and helped to manage the recruitment, training, utilization and deployment of Reserve legal forces worldwide.

Roth retired from the Air Force in 2007 after 32 years of service, in the grade of major general. Over the course of his career, he received numerous awards and decorations, including the Distinguished Service Medal, the Legion of Merit, the Meritorious Service Medal and the Air Force Commendation Medal.

== Civilian life ==
Roth engaged in the practice of labor and employment law with Riverside-based firms for over 30 years and is a member of the State Bars of California and Georgia. Prior to establishing his law practice, Roth worked as an attorney with the National Labor Relations Board. He has served as a part-time adjunct instructor in labor and employment law at the University of California, Riverside’s Anderson School of Management and in the university's extension division.

Roth is a past chairman of the board for the Greater Riverside Chambers of Commerce and past president of the Monday Morning Group. He is a former member of The Raincross Club, the Riverside Community Hospital Advisory Board, the Thomas W. Wathen Foundation Board (Flabob Airport), the Riverside County Bar Association Board of Directors, the Path of Life Ministries Advisory Board, the Air Force Judge Advocate General's School Foundation Board and the La Sierra University Foundation Board.

He is also past vice chairman of the Parkview Community Hospital Board, past member of the Riverside Art Museum Board and a past trustee of the March Field Museum. He currently serves as legal advisor to the Airlift/Tanker Association and as a member of the Riverside Police Foundation. He has served as a lawyer representative to the United States Court of Appeals for the Ninth Circuit Judicial Conference.

Roth and his wife Cindy live in Riverside, California.

== Election to State Senate ==
Roth was elected to represent the California State Senate's 31st Senate District on November 6, 2012, defeating state Assemblyman Jeff Miller. He was sworn into office in California's State Capitol in Sacramento on Monday, December 3, 2012. The 31st Senate District, encompasses northwestern Riverside County, including the cities of Corona, Eastvale, Jurupa Valley, Moreno Valley, Norco, Perris and Riverside.

== Electoral history ==
=== 2024 Riverside County Board of Supervisors, District 1 ===
Riverside County Board of Supervisors, District 1, 2024
Primary election
Candidate	Votes	%
Richard Roth	17,928	31.6
Jose Medina	14,039	24.8
Debbie Walsh	12,829	22.6
Gracie Torres	11,779	20.8
Total votes	56,575	100.0
General election
Jose Medina	71,819	51.1
Richard Roth	68,636	48.8
Total votes	140,455	100.0

=== 2020 California State Senate election ===
2020 California's 31st State Senate district election
Primary election
Party	Candidate	Votes	%
Democratic	Richard Roth (incumbent)	106,435	98.9
Republican	Rod D. Taylor (write-in)	959	0.9
Libertarian	John K. Farr (write-in)	189	0.2
Total votes		107,583	100.0
General election
Democratic	Richard Roth (incumbent)	216,910	59.0
Republican	Rod D. Taylor	150,734	41.0
Total votes		367,644	100.0
Democratic hold			

=== 2016 California State Senate election ===
California's 31st State Senate district election, 2016
Primary election
Party	Candidate	Votes	%
Democratic	Richard Roth (incumbent)	81,504	61.2
Republican	Richard Reed	51,755	38.8
Total votes		133,259	100.0
General election
Democratic	Richard Roth (incumbent)	167,574	60.5
Republican	Richard Reed	109,238	39.5
Total votes		276,812	100.0
Democratic hold			

=== 2012 California State Senate election ===
California's 31st State Senate district election, 2012
Primary election
Party	Candidate	Votes	%
Republican	Jeff Miller	38,641	51.1
Democratic	Richard Roth	21,812	28.8
Democratic	Steve Clute	15,191	20.1
Total votes		75,644	100.0
General election
Democratic	Richard Roth	133,882	55.3
Republican	Jeff Miller	108,320	44.7
Total votes		242,202	100.0
Democratic win (new seat)			
