= James H. Lawrence =

American politician

James H. Lawrence served in the California legislature, and during the Mexican–American War, he served in the US Army.
