= Christopher Cabaldon =

Filipino-American politician

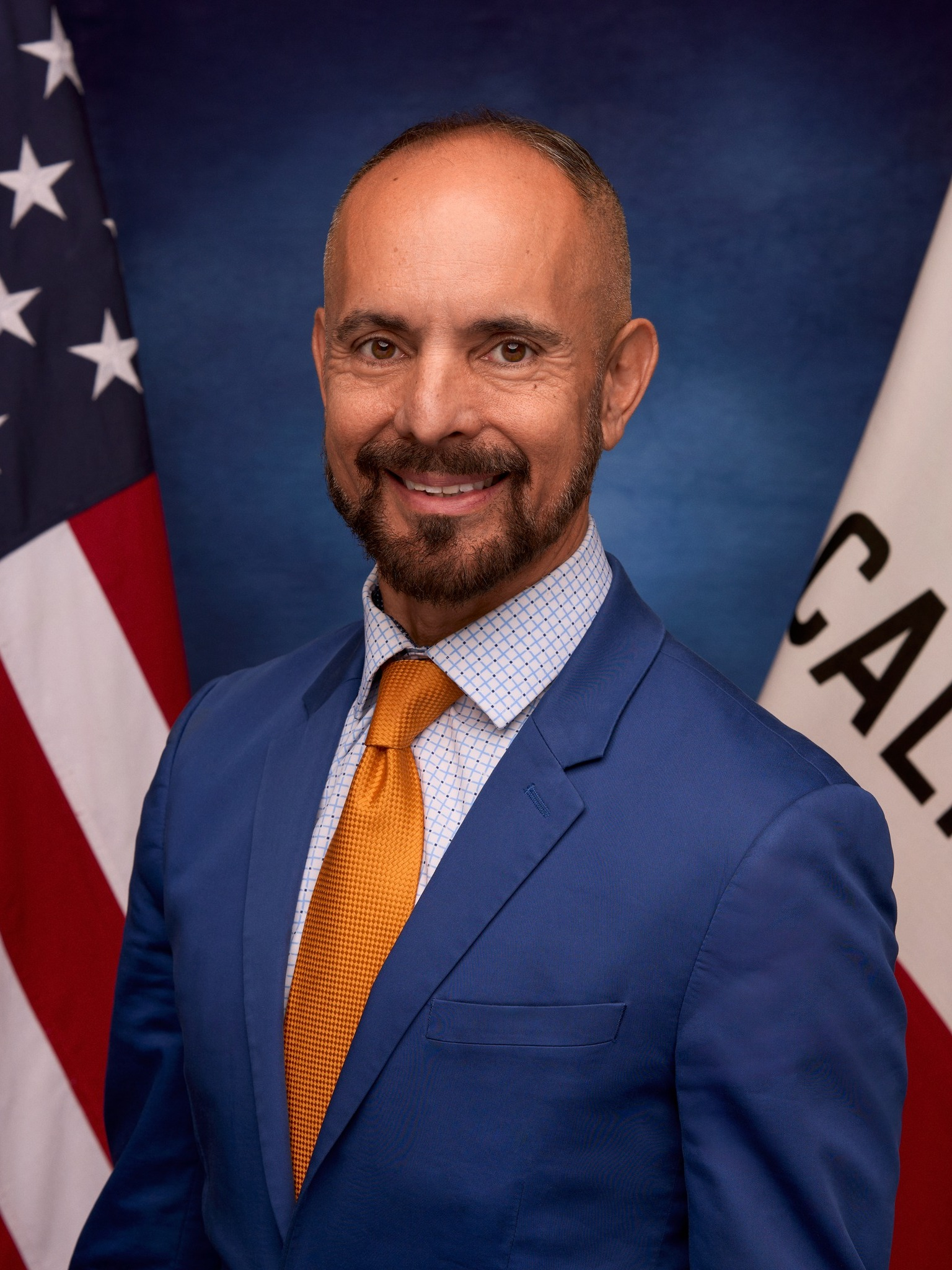
- Official portrait, 2024

Member of the California State Senate from the 3rd district
- Incumbent
- Assumed office December 2, 2024
- Preceded by: Bill Dodd

Mayor of West Sacramento, California
- In office 1998–2020
- Succeeded by: Martha Guerrero

Personal details
- Born: November 12, 1965 (age 60)
- Party: Democratic

Christopher L. Cabaldon (born November 12, 1965) is a member of the California State Senate for the 3rd district (Solano, Yolo, Napa, Sonoma, Contra Costa, and Sacramento counties), serving since 2024. He is the first Filipino-American Senator in California history. He previously served as mayor of West Sacramento from 1998 to 2020, where was the longest-serving mayor in the city's history. He is a member of the Democratic Party.

The former California State Route 275 was renamed Cabaldon Parkway in 2022. Originally US Highway 40, Cabaldon Parkway is the western extension of Capitol Mall across the Tower Bridge, connecting West Sacramento and downtown Sacramento to US 50.

== Early life ==
Enrolling as a founding pupil at the Center for Enriched Studies, the first magnet school in Los Angeles and the centerpiece of the district's voluntary integration program instituted following a court finding of racial segregation, Christopher Cabaldon first became involved in politics as a seventh-grader, speaking at conferences and in media interviews on the subject of desegregation. He became student body president at the school.

Cabaldon earned his BS in Environmental Economics at the University of California, Berkeley, where he was student body vice president. He earned a master's degree in Public Policy and Administration at California State University, Sacramento in its founding class, where he later taught as an adjunct faculty member, received the institution's "Distinguished Service Award," and later was appointed as a tenured faculty member to one of the university's first endowed chairs.

== California Senate ==
Cabaldon was sworn in as the Senator for California's 3rd State Senate District, representing 22 cities and the counties of Solano, Yolo, Napa, Sonoma, Contra Costa, and Sacramento, in December 2024. Under California's term limits, he may serve until 2036.

He was immediately appointed as chair of the Senate Budget subcommittee responsible for government operations and performance, housing and homelessness, consumer protection, insurance, technology and innovation, economic development, household savings, veterans and the military department, and a broad range of other key state agencies. He was also appointed to the Senate's committees on Education, Housing, Local Government, and Appropriations, and the select committee on California's wine industry. He later became chair of the group of legislators representing campuses of the University of California.

In July 2024, Cabaldon was voted "Best Prepared" legislator in a poll of thousands of Capitol insiders by Capitol Weekly, a media organization.

At the end of his first year, Cabaldon was named chair of the new Senate Committee on Privacy, Digital Technologies & Consumer Protection, vice chair of the Joint Legislative Audit Committee, and presiding officer for the Senate floor.

=== Legislation ===
Senator Cabaldon authored two dozen bills which were signed into law in the 2025-25 Session of the California Legislature, including:

- Housing. Cabaldon wrote SB 417 and won passage in partnership with Senate President pro Tem Monique Limón and Assemblymember Buffy Wicks. It became Proposition 1, the $11.25 billion Veterans & Affordable Housing Bond Act, on the November 2026 ballot. The measure will construct 40-50,000 homes as well as support home ownership, Habitat for Humanity, farmworker housing, and other solutions to California's housing crisis.
- Automatic Admission to State University. Cabaldon's SB 640 automatically sends a letter of admission to the California State University to every California graduating high school senior who meets the course and grade-point average admission requirements, without the need to submit an application.
- Lower Fares for Riders, Unionization for Drivers. SB 371 updated insurance requirements for Uber, Lyft, and other rideshare services in order to lower fare for riders and, in conjunction with companion legislation, authorize rideshare drivers to unionize and engage in collective bargaining.
- Stop Private Equity Influence in Healthcare. With the support of doctors and dentists, Cabaldon won passage of SB 351, to enforce strict limits on corporate private equity control or influence of medical and dental practices.
- Stop Illegal Explosives Trafficking and Storage. In the wake of the Esparto fireworks explosion, Cabaldon secured enactment of SB 828, which closes loopholes, strengthens oversight and enforcement, and implements recommendations of the state fireworks task force to prevent similar failures.
- Limit Local Government Use of Nondisclosure Agreements. SB 994 (Cabaldon) prohibits local officials and staff from signing nondisclosure agreements that prevent information from being shared with the elected or appointed governing body of the agency.
- Expand Availability of Specialized Bachelor's Degrees by Community Colleges. Cabaldon's SB 960 authorizes community colleges to more easily offer bachelor's degrees in fields with unmet employer demand to create pathways to careers and support regional economic development.
- Frivolous Lawsuits Against Supportive Housing. Sponsored by the Attorney General, SB 1344 (Cabaldon) allows the Attorney General to seek court dismissal of frivolous litigation against youth homes, permanent supportive housing, and other support services.
- People, Not Bots, in Civic Engagement. SB 1159 makes clear that autonomous artificial intelligence agents are not "persons" when it comes to laws guaranteeing rights to public participation and records in state and local government.

== Education career ==
Cabaldon began in government as Chief Consultant and Staff Director at the age of 24 to the California State Assembly Higher Education Committee and then Chief of Staff to the chair of Appropriations Committee. He began his professional career as Legislative Director of the University of California Students Association, before working for legislative higher education committee chairs Tom Hayden (of the Chicago Seven) and Marguerite Archie-Hudson (who succeeded Maxine Waters in the Assembly and later served as president of Talladega College).

From 1997 to 2003, Cabaldon was vice chancellor of the California Community Colleges System, with executive responsibility for policy, planning, strategy, research, information systems and data, governmental relations, public affairs, and other initiatives for the system of 110 colleges. He then took over as chief executive officer of EdVoice, a nonprofit education advocacy organization founded and chaired by Reed Hastings. He later served as president of the Linked Learning Alliance, program officer for the California Education Policy Fund, and co-director of the California Legislative Staff Education Institute.

California Governor Jerry Brown appointed Cabaldon as the state's representative on the Western Interstate Commission on Higher Education, with unanimous Senate confirmation, in 2011 and again in 2014 and 2018. Cabaldon is chair of the commission's policy and research committee. In 2019, he facilitated a review of the California Master Plan for Higher Education for the Governor.

In 2019, Cabaldon was appointed to the tenured faculty of California State University, Sacramento as the Hazel Cramer Endowed Chair and Professor of Public Policy and Administration. Cabaldon has served as President of Asian Pacific Americans in Higher Education (APAHE), and as a director for the Cal Alumni Association, Foundation for the California Community Colleges, University of California, Davis School of Education and EdSource.

In 2015, President Obama appointed Cabaldon to the National Advisory Board, chaired by Jill Biden, for America's College Promise.

== Mayor of West Sacramento ==
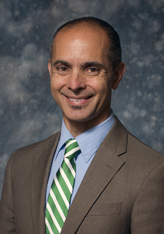
Cabaldon's official portrait as mayor, 2011

Cabaldon became Mayor of West Sacramento in 1998 and served in that capacity for all but two of the subsequent 22 years. He was the city's mayor longer than all other mayors, combined. At the conclusion of his final term, the Sacramento Bee reported that "the hallmark of Cabaldon’s time in the mayor’s chair of West Sacramento has been a time of collaboration and inspiration."

Cabaldon was Chair of the Jobs, Education & the Workforce Committee at the United States Conference of Mayors, where he was elected to the board in June 2011 and then as a trustee in 2019. He had led West Sacramento to be one of the first small/medium cities in the nation to connect all children to high-quality preschool, winning the "America's Most Livable Small City" award from the mayors' organization. He joined a network of a dozen cities in digital badge initiative launched at South by Southwest's education festival to support out-of-classroom learning, skills, and microcredentials for local teens; this work became a national model. Building on the preschool and digital badging initiatives, Cabaldon launched the West Sacramento Home Run, adding college savings accounts for kindergarteners, tuition-free community college for all graduating public school seniors, and a forthcoming scholarship. In 2020, he made West Sacramento the first city in the nation to send a letter of college admission and a scholarship offer to every graduating high school senior. The West Sacramento Home Run has been widely recognized as one of the nation's most innovative and comprehensive initiatives to improve educational attainment and economic opportunity.

Governing reported that "Cabaldon’s approach to leadership has meant that West Sacramento is often at the surprising forefront of municipal policy and experimentation. When he speaks, his big-city peers usually do pay attention. 'When you see his hand go up,' says Tom Cochran, executive director of the U.S. Conference of Mayors, 'you get off your device, you quit your Googling and you listen.'” His initiatives for "repairing roads and trails, reducing homelessness, creating new educational and career paths for residents, and — ultimately — building a place where people can and want to live" were, according to StateScoop, "already are making West Sacramento’s suite of projects uncommonly well-rounded, innovative and ambitious for a city government — particularly for a municipality of just 50,000 people."

In June 2007 Cabaldon authored a resolution for the US Conference of Mayors that supported the Filipino Veterans Fairness Act, that was passed unanimously at the annual conference. In June 2009 he pushed through the most sweeping gay civil rights resolution of any national elected officials organization, US Conference of Mayors Resolution No. 46, 2008 winning support for marriage equality, hate crimes, employment nondiscrimination, and repeal of Don't Ask, Don't Tell. A member of Mayors for the Freedom to Marry, he and the Mayor Stephanie Rawlings-Blake of Baltimore and Mayor Julián Castro of San Antonio published a column, Gay marriage a question of justice, in USA Today in January 2013. In 2019, Cabaldon was named chair of the LGBTQ Mayors Alliance. He is a member of the Mayors Against Illegal Guns Coalition, and a signer of the US Mayors Climate Protection Agreement. Cabaldon was Vice President of the National Conference of Democratic Mayors. He was founder and chairman of the board for the Asian Pacific Youth Leadership Project, a founding member and president of both the Asian Pacific Islander caucus and LGBT Local Officials caucus of the League of California Cities, and a founding member of the Capital Unity Council, a group created to eradicate hate crime violence.

As chair of the Sacramento Area Council of Governments Cabaldon led the region's historic "Blueprint for the Future", which under his leadership won prestigious awards from the US Environmental Protection Agency, two Governors, and a diverse array of national, state, regional, civic, business, and environmental organizations for land-use planning and smart growth strategies.

He has served on an array of state and regional commissions, including being appointed by the Speaker of the Assembly to the Commission on Regionalism, President of the Yolo County Health Council, member of the Blue Ribbon Committee for the Governor's Initiative to Turn Around Failing Schools, appointed by Governor Gray Davis to the Central Valley Regional Water Quality Control Board, and a member of the Sacramento-San Joaquin Delta Protection Commission. He was President of the National Brownfields Association (California), chair of the Yolo County Transportation District, chair of the Yolo County Health Council, and a director for the Great Valley Center.

Along with Georgia State Senator Elena Parent, Cabaldon co-chaired The NewDEAL education policy working group of state and local policymakers from throughout the country. The two co-chairs published a column in The Atlanta Journal-Constitution, "Internet Access is a Right for Every Student", in 2020.

After leaving office, Cabaldon joined the Ewing Marion Kauffman Foundation Mayors Council and the Draper Richards Kaplan Foundation Mayors Council to advance philanthropic investment in entrepreneurship, innovation, and social impact. He was appointed as the inaugural Mayor-in-Residence at the Institute for the Future in 2021.

== Elections ==
Cabaldon was selected mayor of West Sacramento by fellow council members in November 1998, after first being elected to the City Council in 1996. The council chose him for three more one year terms as mayor. In 2004, he won West Sacramento's first direct mayoral election. He was re-elected mayor by the electorate in 2006, 2008, and 2010, was unopposed in the November 2012 general election, reelected with 84.3% of the vote in the 2014 general election, unopposed in the 2016 general election, and re-elected in 2018. In 2020, he was narrowly defeated by City Council member Martha Guerrero.

He was a candidate for the 8th district in the California State Assembly in 2008, losing the primary by three percentage points to Yolo County Supervisor Mariko Yamada.

Cabaldon served as California co-chair of Pete Buttigieg's presidential campaign. Along with Dayton, Ohio Mayor Nan Whaley and Austin, Texas Mayor Steve Adler, he introduced Buttigieg at the launch of the presidential campaign in 2019 in South Bend, Indiana.

In 2024, he became a candidate for the 3rd district in the 2024 California State Senate election He won 30% more votes in the primary election than his closest Democratic Party opponent, Vallejo City Councilwoman Rozzana Verder-Aliga, who was supported by most of the state Democratic Party leadership, advancing to the general election runoff. He then defeated Dixon Mayor Thomas Bogue in the general election.

== Personal life ==
The Logo network featured Cabaldon in a 2006 episode of the series Coming Out Stories, when he came out publicly in his annual State of the City address.

An in-depth Comstock's Magazine cover story, "Behind Closed Doors," told the story of the death of Cabaldon's mother when he was a young boy and the ongoing process of coping, persevering, and finding meaning and purpose after loss.

== Electoral history ==
2024 California State Senate 3rd district election
Primary election
Party	Candidate	Votes	%
Republican	Thom Bogue	61,885	27.8
Democratic	Christopher Cabaldon	59,134	26.6
Democratic	Rozzana Verder-Aliga	45,644	20.5
Democratic	Jackie Elward	41,225	18.5
Republican	Jimih Jones	14,749	6.6
Total votes		222,637	100.0
General election
Democratic	Christopher Cabaldon	277,092	62.6
Republican	Thom Bogue	165,742	37.4
Total votes		442,834	100.0
