= Bev Hansen =

American politician (born 1944)

Member of the California State Assembly from the 8th district
- In office December 1, 1986 - November 30, 1992
- Preceded by: Don Sebastiani
- Succeeded by: Thomas M. Hannigan

Personal details
- Born: Beverly K. Hansen; August 18, 1944 (age 81) Oroville, California, U.S.
- Party: Republican
- Children: 5

Beverly K. "Bev" Hansen (born August 18, 1944, in Oroville, California) is an American politician from California and a member of the Republican Party.

== Career ==
A former staffer to State Senator Jim Nielsen, Hansen was first elected to the California State Assembly in 1986 from the 8th District, representing Lake and Napa counties and parts of Sonoma and Yolo counties. A moderate, she won easily in 1988 and 1990, but opted not to seek reelection in 1992. This was mainly because her district had been redrawn after the 1991 reapportionment and had become decidedly more Democratic, making it a longshot for any Republican. She spent most of 1992 campaigning with and for GOP Assemblyman Bill Filante, who had fallen ill during his run for congress. Had Filante won and been unable to serve, Hansen was mentioned as a possible candidate to replace him. This did not happen as Filante eventually lost to Democrat Lynn Woolsey and died shortly after the election.

Hansen did, however, run for the California State Senate in a 1993 special election for the 4th district left vacant when Democratic incumbent Mike Thompson won election to the neighboring 2nd district (where his home wound up after reapportionment). She lost the GOP primary to then County Supervisor of Shasta County Maurice Johannessen by a wide margin.

Hansen is a lobbyist for Lang, Hansen O'Malley, and Miller Governmental Relations.

== Elections ==
Member, California State Assembly: 1987–1993
| Year | Office | Democrat | Votes | Pct | Republican | Votes | Pct | | | |
|---|---|---|---|---|---|---|---|---|---|---|
| 1986 | California State Assembly; District 8 | Mary Jadiker | 43,831 | 37.3% | Bev Hansen | 73,606 | 62.7% | | | |
| 1988 | California State Assembly; District 8 | Bruce Ketron | 47,976 | 32.5% | Bev Hansen | 94,313 | 63.9% | | | |
| 1990 | California State Assembly; District 8 | none | | | Bev Hansen | 94,722 | 76.5% | Erick W. Roberts | 29,101 | 23.5% |
| 1993 | California State Senate; District 4 (special election) | Montana Podva | 76,509 | 39.1% | Maurice Johannessen 59% Bev Hansen 39% | 108,982 | 55.7% | | | |
