= California's 4th district =

California's 4th district may refer to:

- California's 4th congressional district
- California's 4th State Assembly district
- California's 4th State Senate district
