= Ken Cooley =

American politician

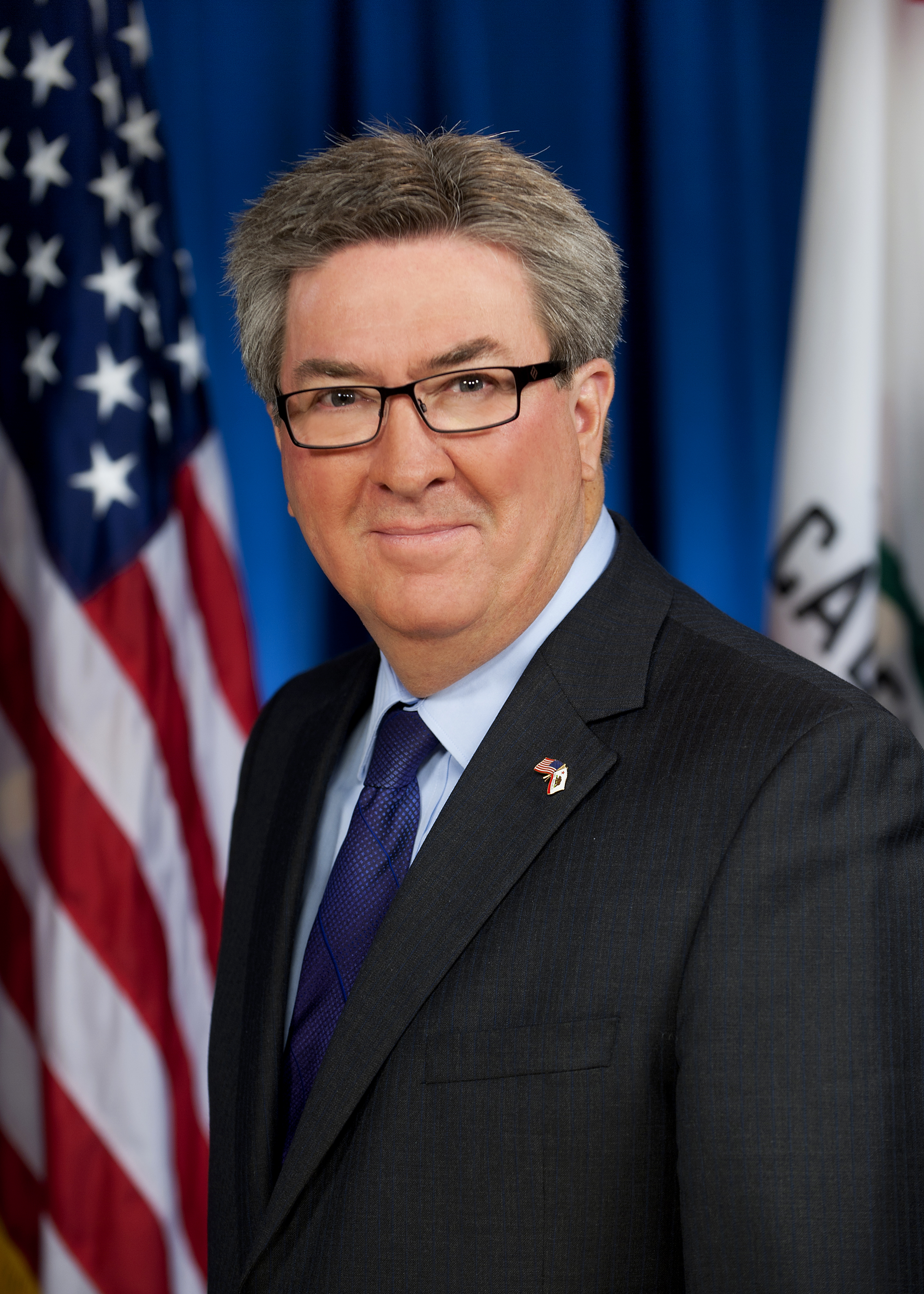

Member of the California State Assembly from the 8th district
- In office December 3, 2012 – December 3, 2022
- Preceded by: Mariko Yamada
- Succeeded by: Josh Hoover

Member of the Rancho Cordova City Council
- In office November 5, 2002 – December 3, 2012
- Preceded by: position established (city incorporation)
- Succeeded by: Donald Terry

Mayor of Rancho Cordova, California
- In office 2005–2006
- Preceded by: Linda Budge
- Succeeded by: Robert J. McGarvey
- In office 2010–2011
- Preceded by: Dan Skoglund
- Succeeded by: Robert J. McGarvey

Personal details
- Born: March 18, 1953 (age 73) Berkeley, California, U.S.
- Party: Democratic
- Education: University of California, Berkeley (BA); McGeorge School of Law (JD)
- Profession: lawyer

Ken William Cooley (born March 18, 1953) is an American politician, who served in the California State Assembly. He is a Democrat and represented California's 8th Assembly District, which encompasses most of eastern Sacramento County, including the cities of Carmichael and Citrus Heights. Following the 2020 Census, Cooley ran for a sixth term in the 7th Assembly District during the 2022 November Elections but lost to Republican Josh Hoover.

Prior to being elected to the Assembly in 2012, he was a mayor and City Councilmember in Rancho Cordova.

== Biography ==
Born in Berkeley and raised in San Lorenzo, Hayward, and San Jose, Cooley graduated from the University of California, Berkeley, in 1977 and the McGeorge School of Law at the University of the Pacific in 1984.

From 1977 to 1985, Cooley was chief of staff to state Assemblyman Lou Papan. From 1985 to 1988, Cooley was legislative counsel at the California Land Title Association. In 1988, Cooley returned to the California State Assembly to be chief counsel to the Finance and Insurance Committee. Cooley was legal counsel to State Farm Insurance from 1991 to 2008.

In 2002, Cooley was elected to the Rancho Cordova City Council. In 2005, he became Mayor.

== 2014 California State Assembly ==
California's 8th State Assembly district election, 2014
Primary election
Party	Candidate	Votes	%
Democratic	Ken Cooley (incumbent)	35,294	51.8
Republican	Douglas Haaland	28,049	41.1
Libertarian	Janice Marlae Bonser	4,830	7.1
Total votes		68,173	100.0
General election
Democratic	Ken Cooley (incumbent)	62,892	56.7
Republican	Douglas Haaland	48,057	43.3
Total votes		110,949	100.0
Democratic hold			

== 2016 California State Assembly ==
California's 8th State Assembly district election, 2016
Primary election
Party	Candidate	Votes	%
Democratic	Ken Cooley (incumbent)	61,704	58.3
Republican	Nick Bloise	36,630	34.6
Libertarian	Janice Marlae Bonser	7,588	7.2
Total votes		105,922	100.0
General election
Democratic	Ken Cooley (incumbent)	104,552	57.0
Republican	Nick Bloise	78,848	43.0
Total votes		183,400	100.0
Democratic hold			

== 2018 California State Assembly ==
California's 8th State Assembly district election, 2018
Primary election
Party	Candidate	Votes	%
Democratic	Ken Cooley (incumbent)	53,490	53.9
Republican	Melinda Avey	40,792	41.1
Libertarian	Janice Marlae Bonser	3,017	3.0
No party preference	Lawrence Ray Murray	2,025	2.0
Total votes		99,324	100.0
General election
Democratic	Ken Cooley (incumbent)	95,450	55.8
Republican	Melinda Avey	75,742	44.2
Total votes		171,192	100.0
Democratic hold			

== 2020 California State Assembly ==
2020 California's 8th State Assembly district election
Primary election
Party	Candidate	Votes	%
Democratic	Ken Cooley (incumbent)	39,321	54.1%
Republican	Cathy Cook	33,405	45.9%
Total votes			
