= Legaci =

Legaci may refer to:

- Legaci, an R&B group from the San Francisco Bay Area
- LEGACI (Land use, Economic development, Growth, Agriculture, Conservation, and Investment) Grants from the Great Valley Center of California
- Legaci Refrigeration Systems, manufactured by Revco, a division of Thermo Fisher Scientific, Inc.
