= Josh Hoover =

Josh Hoover may refer to:

- Josh Hoover (American football) (born 2004)
- Josh Hoover (politician), California politician
