= Don Sebastiani =

American politician (born 1953)

Member of the California State Assembly from the 8th district
- In office December 1, 1980 - November 30, 1986
- Preceded by: Michael Gage
- Succeeded by: Bev Hansen

Personal details
- Born: February 15, 1953 (age 73) Sonoma, California, U.S.
- Party: Republican
- Spouse: Nancy Cecchetti-Sebastiani (after 1975)
- Children: 3
- Education: University of San Francisco

Don Sebastiani (born February 15, 1953), is an American businessman, vintner, and politician who served as a member of the California State Assembly from 1980 to 1986.

== Early life and education ==
Sebastiani was born and raised in Sonoma, California. A member of the Sebastiani family, he is the youngest of three children. He attended St. Francis Solano School in Sonoma, Bellarmine Prep in San Jose, and the University of San Francisco.

== Career ==
Sebastiani served in the California State Assembly as a Republican from the 8th district from 1980 until 1986. In 1986, he launched an unsuccessful bid for California State Controller. In 1986 and 1987, He served as a member of the Advisory Committee for Trade Negotiations in the Reagan Administration.

Sebastiani soon returned to Sonoma to run his family's wine business, Sebastiani Vineyards, where he took production from little more than 200,000 cases to nearly eight million in 15 years. Also, in 1986, along with brother-in-law Roy Cecchetti, Sebastiani began a negociant-style winery, Cecchetti Sebastiani Cellar (CSC). CSC developed the label Pepperwood Grove and the two grew their business to nearly 400,000 cases by 1999.

In the spring of 2001, Sebastiani left the company and, along with his sons Donny and August, started Don Sebastiani & Sons, which developed Smoking Loon and Plungerhead.

== Personal life ==
In 1975, he married fellow USF student Nancy Cecchetti, with whom he has three children.
