= Sebastiani Vineyards and Winery =

Historical place in Sonoma County, United States

Sebastiani Vineyard and Winery
- Location within California Location within the United States
- 38.2933°N 122.4496°W
- Location: 394 4th Street, Sonoma, California

History
- Built: 1825

Site notes
- Governing body: sebastiani.com

California Historical Landmark
- Designated: June 6, 1960
- Reference no.: 739

Sebastiani Vineyard and Winery also called the San Francisco Solano de Sonoma Mission Vineyard was founded in 1825 in Sonoma, California in Sonoma County, California. The Sebastiani Vineyard and Winery is California Historical Landmark No. 739, listed on June 6, 1960.

The location was founded by the Franciscan Fathers at the Mission San Francisco Solano. The wine produced was used for Holy communion in worship church services and Holy mass. The San Francisco Solano de Sonoma Mission Vineyard was the first vineyard in Sonoma Valley. All the California Missions lost land and building in the Mexican secularization act of 1833. First Mexican Republic sold the San Francisco Solano de Sonoma Mission Vineyard to Samuele Sebastiani in 1902. Sebastiani was a young immigrant from Tuscany, Italy who ran the Sebastiani Vineyard and Winery with his wife Elvira. The Sebastiani Vineyard and Winery continues to be a Sebastiani family run vineyard and winery at 394 4th Street in Sonoma.

== See also ==
- California Historical Landmarks in Sonoma County
- Don Sebastiani
