= Michael Gage (politician) =

American politician (1945–2021)

Mike Gage

Member of the California State Assembly from the 8th district
- In office December 6, 1976 – November 30, 1980
- Preceded by: Alfred C. Siegler
- Succeeded by: Don Sebastiani

Personal details
- Born: Michael Gage; May 1, 1945 Glendale, California, U.S.
- Died: August 23, 2021 (aged 76) Salem, Oregon, U.S.
- Party: Democratic

Military service
- Branch/service: United States Army

Michael Gage (May 1, 1945 – August 23, 2021) was an American politician who served as a member of the California State Assembly for the 8th district from December 6, 1976, to November 30, 1980.

== Early life ==
Gage was born in Glendale, California and raised in Napa, California. After graduating from Napa High School in 1963, he served in the United States Army for three years. While in the army, he was a loadmaster and jumpmaster at the United States Army Airborne School at Fort Benning, Georgia. In Spring 1967, started at Napa College, where he attended for two years.

== Career ==
Gage began his career as a staff director for the California State Senate Democratic Caucus. He later served as a field coordinator for John F. Dunlap. Gage was elected to the California State Assembly in 1976 and re-elected in 1978. Gage was a primary candidate in 1980 before opting not to seek re-election. He was succeeded by businessman and vintner Don Sebastiani.

After leaving the Assembly, Gage became an environmental activist. He advocated for the transition away from nuclear energy to alternative energy. From 1987 to 1990, Gage served as deputy mayor of Los Angeles under Tom Bradley. He was later elected to the Metropolitan Water District of Southern California. From 1992 to 1999, he was the president of CALSTART, a non-profit clean energy company based in Pasadena, California. From 2001 to 2003, he was the vice president and southwest regional director of the Trust for Public Land.

Gage worked for Blue Moose Farm, a sustainable farm in Salem, Oregon.

== Personal life ==
He died of cancer on August 23, 2021, in Salem, Oregon, at age 76.
