= California's 3rd senatorial district =

American legislative district

California's 3rd State Senate district
Current senator
Christopher Cabaldon; D–West Sacramento
- Population (2010) • Voting age • Citizen voting age: 928,167; 716,049; 612,229
- Demographics: 51.52% White; 8.01% Black; 24.98% Latino; 12.48% Asian; 1.00% Native American; 0.64% Hawaiian/Pacific Islander; 0.32% other; 1.04% remainder of multiracial
- Registered voters: 556,418
- Registration: 50.35% Democratic; 21.10% Republican; 22.84% No party preference

California's 3rd senatorial district is one of 40 California State Senate districts. It is currently represented by Democrat Christopher Cabaldon of West Sacramento.

== District profile ==
Spanning 3,000 square miles, the district includes California Wine Country, the Sacramento-San Joaquin River Delta, and University of California, Davis, and consists of Napa, Yolo, and Solano Counties as well as parts of Sonoma, Contra Costa, and Sacramento Counties.

== Election results from statewide races ==
Year	Office	Results
2021	Recall	No 67.7 – 32.3%
2020	President	Biden 68.1 – 29.5%
2018	Governor	Newsom 65.5 – 34.5%
2018	Senator	Feinstein 53.9 – 46.1%
2016	President	Clinton 65.3 – 28.0%
2016	Senator	Harris 68.3 – 31.7%
2014	Governor	Brown 68.0 – 32.0%
2012	President	Obama 65.4 – 32.0%
2012	Senator	Feinstein 68.0 – 32.0%

== List of senators representing the district ==
Due to redistricting, the 3rd district has been moved around different parts of the state. The current iteration resulted from the 2021 redistricting by the California Citizens Redistricting Commission.

Senator	Party	Years served	Electoral history	Counties represented
Pablo de la Guerra (Santa Barbara)	Whig	January 6, 1851 – January 5, 1852	Redistricted from the San Luis Obispo district and re-elected in 1850. Re-elected in 1853. Redistricted to the 2nd district.	San Luis Obispo, Santa Barbara
Antonio M. de la Guerra (Santa Barbara)	Democratic	January 5, 1852 – January 3, 1853	Elected in 1851; Re-elected in 1852. [data missing]	San Luis Obispo, Santa Barbara
Pablo de la Guerra (Santa Barbara)	Whig	January 3, 1853 – January 2, 1854	Elected in 1853. Redistricted to the 2nd district.	San Luis Obispo, Santa Barbara
[data missing]		January 2, 1854 – January 1, 1855	[data missing]	San Luis Obispo, Santa Barbara
Delos R. Ashley (San Luis Obispo)	Know Nothing	January 1, 1855 – January 5, 1857	Elected in 1855. [data missing]	Monterey, Santa Cruz
D. S. Gregory (Santa Cruz)	Democratic	January 5, 1857 – January 3, 1859	Elected in 1857. [data missing]	Monterey, Santa Cruz
John H. Watson (Santa Cruz)	Democratic	January 3, 1859 – January 7, 1861	Elected in 1859. [data missing]	Monterey, Santa Cruz
Romualdo Pacheco (Santa Barbara)	Union; Democratic	January 7, 1861 – December 7, 1863	Elected in 1861. Retired to become California State Treasurer.	San Luis Obispo, Santa Barbara
Juan Y. Cot (Santa Barbara)	Union	December 7, 1863 – December 4, 1865	Elected in 1863. [data missing]	San Luis Obispo, Santa Barbara
Patrick W. Murphy (Santa Margarita)	Democratic	December 4, 1865 – January 7, 1869	Elected in 1865. Re-elected in 1887. [data missing]	San Luis Obispo, Santa Barbara
Romualdo Pacheco (Santa Barbara)	Republican	January 7, 1869 – December 8, 1871	Elected in 1868. Resigned to become Lieutenant Governor of California.	San Luis Obispo, Santa Barbara
James Van Ness (San Luis Obispo)	Democratic	December 8, 1871 – December 8, 1871	Elected to finish Pacheco's term. [data missing]	San Luis Obispo, Santa Barbara
William J. Graves (San Luis Obispo)	Democratic	December 1, 1873 – December 3, 1877	Elected in 1873. Re-elected in 1875. [data missing]	San Luis Obispo, Santa Barbara, Ventura
Warren Chase (Santa Barbara)	Workingmen's	January 5, 1880 – January 8, 1883	Elected in 1879. Resigned to run for U.S. House of Representatives.	San Luis Obispo, Santa Barbara, Ventura
George Steele (San Luis Obispo)	Republican	January 8, 1883 – February 23, 1883	Elected to finish Chase's term. Unseated after his opponent contested election.	San Luis Obispo, Santa Barbara, Ventura
J. Marion Brooks (Ventura)	Democratic	February 23, 1883 – January 5, 1885	Elected after successful contest. [data missing]	San Luis Obispo, Santa Barbara, Ventura
George Steele (San Luis Obispo)	Republican	January 5, 1885 – January 3, 1887	Elected in 1884. Redistricted to the 37th district.	San Luis Obispo, Santa Barbara, Ventura
W. H. Patterson (Cedarville)	Republican	January 3, 1887 – January 7, 1889	Elected in 1886. [data missing]	Lassen, Modoc, Plumas, Sierra
M. H. Mead (Downieville)	Democratic	January 7, 1889 – January 2, 1893	Elected in 1888. [data missing]	Lassen, Modoc, Plumas, Sierra
Tirey L. Ford (Downieville)	Republican	January 2, 1893 – January 4, 1897	Elected in 1982.	Nevada, Plumas, Sierra
William F. Prisk (Grass Valley)	Democratic	January 4, 1897 – January 1, 1901	Elected in 1896. Retired.	Nevada, Plumas, Sierra
John R. Tyrrell (Grass Valley)	Republican	January 1, 1901 – January 2, 1905	Elected in 1900. [data missing]	Nevada, Plumas, Sierra
John B. Irish (Colfax)	Republican	January 2, 1905 – January 4, 1909	Elected in 1904. [data missing]	Nevada, Plumas, Sierra, Placer
E. S. Birdsall (Auburn)	Republican	January 4, 1909 – January 8, 1917	Elected in 1908. Re-elected in 1912. [data missing]	Nevada, Plumas, Sierra, Placer
Thomas Ingram (Grass Valley)	Republican	January 8, 1917 – August 4, 1928	Elected in 1916. Re-elected in 1920. Re-elected in 1924. [data missing]	Nevada, Plumas, Sierra, Placer, El Dorado
Bert A. Cassidy (Auburn)	Republican	January 7, 1929 – January 2, 1933	Elected in 1928. [data missing]	Nevada, Plumas, Sierra, Placer, El Dorado
Harry A. Perry (Ferndale)	Republican	January 2, 1933 – January 4, 1937	Elected in 1932. [data missing]	Humboldt
Irwin T. Quinn (Auburn)	Democratic	January 4, 1937 – January 3, 1949	Elected in 1936. Re-elected in 1940. Re-elected in 1944. [data missing]	Humboldt
Michael J. Burns (Eureka)	Republican	January 3, 1949 – May 1, 1949	Elected in 1948. Died.	Humboldt
Vacant		May 1, 1949 – November 21, 1949		Humboldt
Arthur W. Way (Eureka)	Republican	November 21, 1949 – January 7, 1957	Elected to finish Burns's term. Re-elected in 1952. Lost renomination.	Humboldt
Carl L. Christensen (Eureka)	Democratic	January 7, 1957 – January 2, 1967	Elected in 1956. Re-elected in 1960. Re-elected in 1964. [data missing]	Humboldt
Stephen P. Teale (Rail Road Flat)	Democratic	January 2, 1967 – January 8, 1973	Redistricted from the 26th district and re-elected in 1966. Re-elected in 1968. [data missing]	Alpine, Amador, Calaveras, El Dorado, Lassen, Modoc, Nevada, Placer, Plumas, Sierra, Stanislaus, Tuolumne
Clare Berryhill (Ceres)	Republican	January 8, 1973 – November 30, 1976	Elected in 1972. [data missing]	Alpine, Amador, Calaveras, El Dorado, Lassen, Modoc, Nevada, Placer, Plumas, Sierra, Stanislaus, Tuolumne
Albert S. Rodda (Sacramento)	Democratic	December 6, 1976 – November 30, 1980	Redistricted from the 5th district and re-elected in 1976. Retired.	Sacramento
John Doolittle (Rocklin)	Republican	December 1, 1980 – November 30, 1984	Elected in 1980. Redistricted to the 1st district.	Sacramento
Milton Marks (San Francisco)	Republican	December 3, 1984 – January 8, 1986	Redistricted from the 5th district and re-elected in 1984. Re-elected in 1988. Re-elected in 1992. Term-limited and retired.	Marin, San Francisco
Milton Marks (San Francisco)	Democratic	January 8, 1986 – November 30, 1996	Redistricted from the 5th district and re-elected in 1984. Re-elected in 1988. Re-elected in 1992. Term-limited and retired.	Marin, San Francisco, Sonoma
John Burton (San Francisco)	Democratic	December 2, 1996 – November 30, 2004	Elected in 1996. Re-elected in 2000. Term-limited and retired.	Marin, San Francisco, Sonoma
Carole Migden (San Francisco)	Democratic	December 6, 2004 – November 30, 2008	Elected in 2004. Lost renomination.	Marin, San Francisco, Sonoma
Mark Leno (San Francisco)	Democratic	December 1, 2008 – November 30, 2012	Elected in 2008. Redistricted to the 11th district.	Marin, San Francisco, Sonoma
Lois Wolk (Davis)	Democratic	December 3, 2012 – November 30, 2016	Redistricted from the 5th district and re-elected in 2012. Term-limited and retired.	Contra Costa, Napa, Sacramento, Solano, Sonoma, Yolo
Bill Dodd (Napa)	Democratic	December 5, 2016 – November 30, 2024	Elected in 2016. Re-elected in 2020. Term-limited and retired.	Contra Costa, Napa, Sacramento, Solano, Sonoma, Yolo
Christopher Cabaldon (West Sacramento)	Democratic	December 2, 2024 – present	Elected in 2024.	Contra Costa, Napa, Sacramento, Solano, Sonoma, Yolo

== Election results (1990-present) ==
=== 2024 ===
2024 California State Senate 3rd district election
Primary election
Party	Candidate	Votes	%
Republican	Thom Bogue	61,885	27.8
Democratic	Christopher Cabaldon	59,134	26.6
Democratic	Rozzana Verder-Aliga	45,644	20.5
Democratic	Jackie Elward	41,225	18.5
Republican	Jimih Jones	14,749	6.6
Total votes		222,637	100.0
General election
Democratic	Christopher Cabaldon	277,092	62.6
Republican	Thom Bogue	165,742	37.4
Total votes		442,834	100.0
Democratic hold			

=== 2020 ===
2020 California State Senate 3rd district election
Primary election
Party	Candidate	Votes	%
Democratic	Bill Dodd (incumbent)	212,004	98.6
Republican	Carlos Santamaria (write-in)	2,126	1.0
Green	Karen I. Nyhus (write-in)	530	0.2
No party preference	Jaclyn Qirreh (write-in)	421	0.2
Total votes		215,081	100.0
General election
Democratic	Bill Dodd (incumbent)	323,317	68.4
Republican	Carlos Santamaria	149,461	31.6
Total votes		472,778	100.0
Democratic hold			

=== 2016 ===
2016 California State Senate 3rd district election
Primary election
Party	Candidate	Votes	%
Democratic	Bill Dodd	90,396	37.4
Democratic	Mariko Yamada	72,243	29.9
Republican	Greg "Coach" Coppes	54,525	22.6
Democratic	Gabe Griess	24,540	10.2
Total votes		241,704	100.0
General election
Democratic	Bill Dodd	207,927	58.1
Democratic	Mariko Yamada	149,701	41.9
Total votes		357,628	100.0
Democratic hold			

=== 2012 ===
2012 California State Senate 3rd district election
Primary election
Party	Candidate	Votes	%
Democratic	Lois Wolk (incumbent)	116,403	96.9
Republican	Frank Miranda (write-in)	2,402	2.0
Republican	Gary Clift (write-in)	1,341	1.1
Total votes		120,146	100.0
General election
Democratic	Lois Wolk (incumbent)	233,406	66.2
Republican	Frank Miranda	119,033	33.8
Total votes		352,439	100.0
Democratic hold			

=== 2008 ===
2008 California State Senate 3rd district election
Party	Candidate	Votes	%
Democratic	Mark Leno	326,755	80.2
Republican	Sashi McEntee	80,617	19.8
Total votes		407,372	100.0
Democratic hold			

=== 2004 ===
2004 California State Senate 3rd district election
Party	Candidate	Votes	%
Democratic	Carole Migden	258,166	68.2
Republican	Andrew D. Felder	98,332	26.0
Peace and Freedom	Ian J. Grimes	12,013	3.1
Libertarian	David Rhodes	10,234	2.7
Total votes		378,745	100.0
Democratic hold			

=== 2000 ===
2000 California State Senate 3rd district election
Party	Candidate	Votes	%
Democratic	John L. Burton (incumbent)	238,372	73.0
Republican	Terence Faulkner	71,256	21.8
Natural Law	Celeste Joy Blau Joki	17,277	5.3
Total votes		326,905	100.0
Democratic hold			

=== 1996 ===
1996 California State Senate 3rd district election
Party	Candidate	Votes	%
Democratic	John L. Burton	215,831	70.8
Republican	Curtis Rau	72,097	23.7
Libertarian	Donald E. Harte	16,819	5.5
Total votes		304,747	100.0
Democratic hold			

=== 1992 ===
1992 California State Senate 3rd district election
Party	Candidate	Votes	%
Democratic	Milton Marks (incumbent)	225,869	66.4
Republican	Bill Boerum	85,323	25.1
Libertarian	Will C. Wohler	16,590	4.9
Peace and Freedom	Giovanni Graham	12,163	3.6
Total votes		339,945	100.0
Democratic hold			

== See also ==
- California State Senate
- California State Senate districts
- Districts in California
