= Chester F. Gannon =

American politician

Member of the California State Assembly from the 8th district
- In office January 4, 1943 - January 3, 1949
- Preceded by: John Edward Cain
- Succeeded by: Gordon A. Fleury
- In office January 4, 1937 - January 6, 1941
- Preceded by: Roy J. Nielsen
- Succeeded by: John Edward Cain

Personal details
- Born: April 19, 1888 Truckee, California
- Died: January 17, 1963 (aged 74)
- Party: Republican
- Spouse: Ruth Oakley

Military service
- Allegiance: United States
- Branch/service: United States Army
- Battles/wars: World War I

Chester F. Gannon (April 19, 1888 – January 17, 1963) was a United States Republican politician.

Gannon was born in Truckee, California, and served in the United States Army during World War I. He was a member of the California state legislature and in 1940 was a member of the Assembly Investigating Committee on Interference With the Legislature.
