= Walter W. Powers =

American politician

Member of the California State Assembly from the 8th district
- In office November 27, 1962 – November 30, 1974
- Preceded by: William Adolphus “Jimmy” Hicks
- Succeeded by: Alfred C. Siegler

Personal details
- Born: September 2, 1922 Escalon, California
- Died: May 25, 1985 (aged 62) Sacramento, California
- Party: Democratic
- Spouse: Elma E. "Lynn" Barger (after 1948)
- Children: 1

Military service
- Allegiance: United States
- Branch/service: United States Marine Corps
- Battles/wars: World War II

Walter W. Powers (September 2, 1922 – May 25, 1985) a former Councilman and Mayor of North Sacramento, served in the California legislature as an Assemblyman from November 27, 1962 to November 30, 1974, losing the Democratic primary in 1974 and, attempting a comeback in 1982, losing the Republican primary in that year. During World War II he served in the United States Marine Corps. He received the Distinguished Flying Cross Award for extraordinary achievement while participating in aerial flight, in actions against enemy Japanese forces in the Pacific Theater of Operations during World War II.
