= Helen Thomson (politician) =

American politician

Member of the California State Assembly from the 8th district
- In office December 2, 1996 - November 30, 2002
- Preceded by: Thomas M. Hannigan
- Succeeded by: Lois Wolk

Personal details
- Born: June 8, 1940 (age 86) Massachusetts
- Party: Democratic
- Spouse(s): Captane P. Thomson, MD
- Children: 3

Helen MacLeod Thomson is a former member of the Yolo County Board of Supervisors and a former Democratic assemblywoman from California's 8th Assembly district. Thomson was first elected to the assembly in 1996 and served three two-year terms. She was the first of what have become three consecutive women from Davis to be elected to this seat, followed by Lois Wolk and Mariko Yamada.

== Political career ==
Helen Thomson was elected in 1974 to the Davis Joint Unified School District Board of Education. She was elected to the Yolo County Board of Supervisors in 1986 and re-elected in 1990 and 1994. She won the seat in the California State Assembly in 1996, and served three terms. In 2002, when her assembly term ended, Thomson again won a seat on the Yolo County Board of Supervisors, and was re-elected without opposition in June 2006. Thomson retired from the Board of Supervisors in 2010, and was succeeded by Don Saylor.

== Personal ==
Helen Thomson is a registered nurse, the mother of three and a grandmother of four. She lives in Davis with her husband, Captane P. Thomson, M.D., a practicing psychiatrist, and former head of the California Psychiatric Association.
