= Seth Millington =

American politician

Seth Millington Jr.
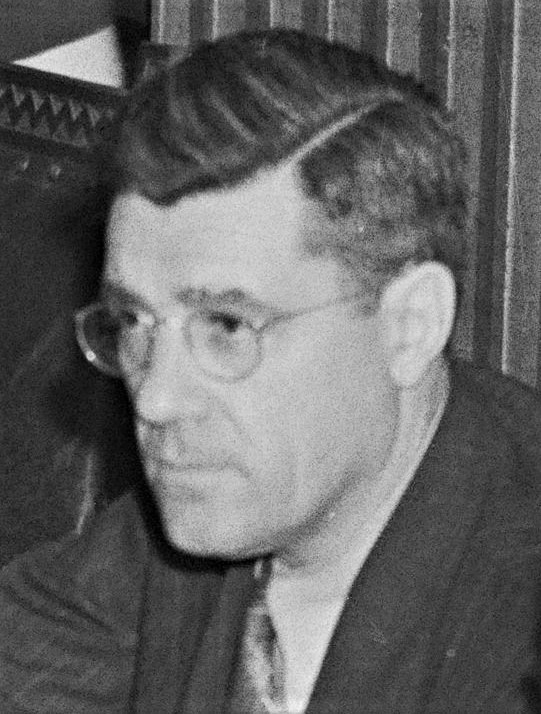
- Millington in 1940

Member of the California State Assembly from the 4th district
- In office January 4, 1937 – January 4, 1943
- Preceded by: John Evangelist Frazier
- Succeeded by: Albert M. King

Personal details
- Born: November 1, 1893 Willows, California, U.S.
- Died: April 8, 1973 (aged 79)
- Party: Democratic
- Spouse: Valetta Johnson
- Children: 2

Military service
- Allegiance: United States
- Branch/service: United States Army
- Battles/wars: World War I

Seth Millington Jr. served in the California State Assembly for the 4th district and during World War I he served in the United States Army.
