= Harold E. Booth =

American politician

Harold Booth

Member of the California State Assembly from the 4th district
- In office January 7, 1963 – January 4, 1965
- Preceded by: Harold Thomas Sedgwick
- Succeeded by: Ray E. Johnson

Personal details
- Born: October 30, 1911 Soldier, Kansas, US
- Died: December 6, 1970 (aged 59) Orland, California, US
- Party: Democratic
- Spouse: Marie Schetinin (m. 1935)
- Children: Barbara Marie and Frances Laverne

Harold Edward Booth (October 30, 1911 – December 6, 1970) was a Democratic member of the California State Assembly from the 4th district from 1963 to 1965.

== Early life ==
Booth was born on October 30, 1911, in Soldier, Kansas. He lived in California for most of his life.

== Political career ==
Booth won the 4th State Assembly district election in 1962, narrowly beating Republican candidate Ray E. Johnson. He lost to Johnson two years later, in 1964.

== Sources ==
Political offices
Preceded by Harold Thomas Sedgwick	Member of the California State Assembly from the 4th district 1963–1965	Succeeded by Ray E. Johnson
