= John Edward Cain =

American politician

Member of the California State Assembly from the 8th district
- In office January 6, 1941 – January 4, 1943
- Preceded by: Chester M. Gannon
- Succeeded by: Chester M. Gannon

Personal details
- Born: January 10, 1887
- Died: October 4, 1951 (aged 64)
- Party: Democratic

Military service
- Allegiance: United States
- Branch/service: United States Army
- Battles/wars: World War I

John Edward Cain (January 10, 1887 – October 4, 1951) was an American politician who served in the California legislature as an Assembly member for the 8th district. During World War I he served in the United States Army.
