= California's 8th State Assembly district =

American legislative district

Current assemblymember
David Tangipa; R–Fresno
- Population (2010) • Voting age • Citizen voting age: 463,773; 352,594; 310,070
- Demographics: 61.19% White; 8.48% Black; 17.68% Latino; 9.14% Asian; 1.41% Native American; 0.73% Hawaiian/Pacific Islander; 0.28% other; 1.09% remainder of multiracial
- Registered voters: 263,704
- Registration: 39.76% Democratic; 32.54% Republican; 22.02% No party preference

California's 8th State Assembly district is one of 80 California State Assembly districts. It is currently represented by Republican David Tangipa of Fresno.

== District profile ==
The district comprises seven California counties in the Central Sierra Nevada and Eastern Sierra regions of the state along with the northeastern portion of Fresno County

- Calaveras County (part)
- Fresno County (part)
- Inyo County (all)
- Madera County (part)
- Mariposa County (all)
- Mono County (all)
- Tuolumne County (all)

== Election results from statewide races ==
Year	Office	Results
2021	Recall	No 54.0 – 46.0%
2020	President	Biden 55.1 - 42.2%
2018	Governor	Newsom 52.2 – 47.8%
2018	Senator	De Leon 50.1 – 49.9%
2016	President	Clinton 51.8 – 41.0%
2016	Senator	Harris 65.4 – 34.6%
2014	Governor	Brown 56.5 – 43.5%
2012	President	Obama 51.6 – 45.5%
2012	Senator	Feinstein 54.5 – 45.5%

== List of assembly members representing the district ==
Due to redistricting, the 8th district has been moved around different parts of the state. The current iteration resulted from the 2021 redistricting by the California Citizens Redistricting Commission.

Assembly members	Party	Years served	Counties represented	Notes
Allen Henry	Democratic	January 5, 1885 – January 4, 1889	Butte	
C. H. Porter	Republican	January 4, 1889 – January 5, 1891	Butte	
T. H. Barnard	Republican	January 5, 1891 – January 2, 1893	Butte	
D. P. Durst	Republican	January 2, 1893 – January 7, 1895	Sutter, Yuba	
William M. Cutter	Republican	January 7, 1895 – January 2, 1899	Sutter, Yuba	
Charles G. Raub	Republican	January 2, 1899 – January 1, 1901	Sutter, Yuba	
Lawrence Schillig	Republican	January 1, 1901 – January 5, 1903	Sutter, Yuba	
Alexander C. McLaughlin	Republican	January 5, 1903 – January 2, 1905	Sutter, Yuba	
E. T. Manwell	Republican	January 2, 1905 – January 7, 1907	Sutter, Yuba	
Arthur Hathaway Hewitt	Republican	January 7, 1907 – January 6, 1913	Sutter, Yuba	
Joseph Alfred Murray	Republican	January 6, 1913 – January 4, 1915	Sutter, Yuba, Yolo	
L. N. Tabler	Democratic	January 4, 1915 – January 8, 1917	Sutter, Yuba, Yolo	
Louis Tarke	Republican	January 8, 1917 – January 6, 1919	Sutter, Yuba, Yolo	
Edward Lewis	Republican	January 6, 1919 – January 8, 1923	Sutter, Yuba, Yolo	
Fred B. Noyes	Republican	January 8, 1923 – January 5, 1931	Sutter, Yuba, Yolo	
Frank L. Gordon	Republican	January 5, 1931 – January 2, 1933	Napa, Yolo	
Roy J. Nielsen	Republican	January 2, 1933 – January 4, 1937	Sacramento	
Chester M. Gannon	Democratic	January 4, 1937 – January 6, 1941	Sacramento	
John Edward Cain	Democratic	January 6, 1941 – January 4, 1943	Sacramento	
Chester M. Gannon	Republican	January 4, 1943 – January 3, 1949	Sacramento	
Gordon A. Fleury	Republican	January 3, 1949 – August 28, 1955	Sacramento	Resigned from the California State Assembly.
Vacant		August 28, 1955 – January 7, 1957	Sacramento	
Thomas Jamison MacBride	Democratic	January 7, 1957 – January 2, 1961	Sacramento	
William Adolphus “Jimmy” Hicks	Democratic	January 2, 1961 – December 29, 1961	Sacramento	Died in office from a heart attack.
Vacant		December 29, 1961 – November 27, 1962	Sacramento	
Walter W. Powers	Democratic	November 27, 1962 – November 30, 1974	Sacramento	Was sworn in on November 27, 1962 after winning the special election.
Alfred C. Siegler	Democratic	December 2, 1974 – May 18, 1976	Napa, Solano, Sonoma	Died in office from a heart attack while playing tennis.
Vacant		May 18, 1976 – December 6, 1976	Napa, Solano, Sonoma	
Michael Gage	Democratic	December 6, 1976 – November 30, 1980	Napa, Solano, Sonoma	
Don Sebastiani	Republican	December 1, 1980 – November 30, 1982	Napa, Solano, Sonoma	
Don Sebastiani	Republican	December 6, 1982 – November 30, 1986	Lake, Napa, Solano, Sonoma	
Bev Hansen	Republican	December 1, 1986 – November 30, 1992	Lake, Napa, Solano, Sonoma	
Thomas M. Hannigan	Democratic	December 7, 1992 – November 30, 1996	Sacramento, Solano, Yolo	
Helen Thomson	Democratic	December 2, 1996 – November 30, 2002	Sacramento, Solano, Yolo	
Lois Wolk	Democratic	December 2, 2002 – November 30, 2008	Solano, Yolo	
Mariko Yamada	Democratic	December 1, 2008 – November 30, 2012	Solano, Yolo	
Ken Cooley	Democratic	December 3, 2012 – November 30, 2022	Sacramento	
Jim Patterson	Republican	December 5, 2022 – November 30, 2024	Calaveras, Fresno, Inyo, Madera, Mariposa, Mono, Tuolumne	
David Tangipa	Republican	December 2, 2024 – present	Calaveras, Fresno, Inyo, Madera, Mariposa, Mono, Tuolumne	

== Election results (1990–present) ==
=== 2024 ===
2024 California State Assembly 8th district election
Primary election
Party	Candidate	Votes	%
Republican	George Radanovich	48,868	36.1
Republican	David Tangipa	42,318	31.3
Democratic	Caleb Helsel	40,089	29.6
No party preference	Michael Matheson	4,097	3.0
Total votes		91,246	100.0
General election
Republican	David Tangipa	113,407	53.7
Republican	George Radanovich	97,770	46.3
Total votes		211,177	100.0
Republican hold			

=== 2022 ===
2022 California State Assembly 8th district election
Primary election
Party	Candidate	Votes	%
Republican	Jim Patterson (incumbent)	91,237	100.0
Libertarian	Thomas Nichols	15	0.0
Total votes		91,252	100.0
General election
Republican	Jim Patterson (incumbent)	128,124	74.2
Libertarian	Cathy Cook	44,451	25.8
Total votes		172,575	100.0
Republican gain from Democratic			

=== 2020 ===
2020 California State Assembly 8th district election
Primary election
Party	Candidate	Votes	%
Democratic	Ken Cooley (incumbent)	73,444	57.0
Republican	Cathy Cook	55,376	43.0
Total votes		128,820	100.0
General election
Democratic	Ken Cooley (incumbent)	126,969	55.1
Republican	Cathy Cook	103,496	44.9
Total votes		230,465	100.0
Democratic hold			

=== 2018 ===
2018 California State Assembly 8th district election
Primary election
Party	Candidate	Votes	%
Democratic	Ken Cooley (incumbent)	53,490	53.9
Republican	Melinda Avey	40,792	41.1
Libertarian	Janice Marlae Bonser	3,017	3.0
No party preference	Lawrence Ray Murray	2,025	2.0
Total votes		99,324	100.0
General election
Democratic	Ken Cooley (incumbent)	95,450	55.8
Republican	Melinda Avey	75,742	44.2
Total votes		171,192	100.0
Democratic hold			

=== 2016 ===
2016 California State Assembly 8th district election
Primary election
Party	Candidate	Votes	%
Democratic	Ken Cooley (incumbent)	61,704	58.3
Republican	Nick Bloise	36,630	34.6
Libertarian	Janice Marlae Bonser	7,588	7.2
Total votes		105,922	100.0
General election
Democratic	Ken Cooley (incumbent)	104,552	57.0
Republican	Nick Bloise	78,848	43.0
Total votes		183,400	100.0
Democratic hold			

=== 2014 ===
2014 California State Assembly 8th district election
Primary election
Party	Candidate	Votes	%
Democratic	Ken Cooley (incumbent)	35,294	51.8
Republican	Douglas Haaland	28,049	41.1
Libertarian	Janice Marlae Bonser	4,830	7.1
Total votes		68,173	100.0
General election
Democratic	Ken Cooley (incumbent)	62,892	56.7
Republican	Douglas Haaland	48,057	43.3
Total votes		110,949	100.0
Democratic hold			

=== 2012 ===
2012 California State Assembly 8th district election
Primary election
Party	Candidate	Votes	%
Democratic	Ken Cooley	33,304	42.8
Republican	Peter Tateishi	18,237	23.4
Republican	Barbara Ortega	15,592	20.0
Republican	John Thomas Flynn	4,853	6.2
Libertarian	Janice Marlae Bonser	3,368	4.3
Republican	Phillip A. Tufi	2,424	3.1
Total votes		77,778	100.0
General election
Democratic	Ken Cooley	92,630	54.3
Republican	Peter Tateishi	78,006	45.7
Total votes		170,636	100.0
Democratic hold			

=== 2010 ===
2010 California State Assembly 8th district election
Party	Candidate	Votes	%
Democratic	Mariko Yamada (incumbent)	79,846	61.6
Republican	Michelle P. Connor	49,797	38.4
Total votes		129,643	100.0
Democratic hold			

=== 2008 ===
2008 California State Assembly 8th district election
Party	Candidate	Votes	%
Democratic	Mariko Yamada	112,524	66.0
Republican	Manuel Cosme	57,883	34.0
Total votes		170,407	100.0
Democratic hold			

=== 2006 ===
2006 California State Assembly 8th district election
Party	Candidate	Votes	%
Democratic	Lois Wolk (incumbent)	78,171	66.0
Republican	John Gould	40,238	34.0
Total votes		118,409	100.0
Democratic hold			

=== 2004 ===
2004 California State Assembly 8th district election
Party	Candidate	Votes	%
Democratic	Lois Wolk (incumbent)	101,171	62.83
Republican	John R. Munn	59,842	37.17
Total votes		161,013	100.00
Democratic hold			

=== 2002 ===
2002 California State Assembly 8th district election
Party	Candidate	Votes	%
Democratic	Lois Wolk	57,360	58.1
Republican	John R. Munn	41,482	41.9
Total votes		98,842	100.0
Democratic hold			

=== 2000 ===
2000 California State Assembly 8th district election
Party	Candidate	Votes	%
Democratic	Helen Thomson (incumbent)	92,315	62.2
Republican	John R. Munn	51,671	34.8
Natural Law	Robert W. Wilson	4,483	3.0
Total votes		148,469	100.0
Democratic hold			

=== 1998 ===
1998 California State Assembly 8th district election
Party	Candidate	Votes	%
Democratic	Helen Thomson (incumbent)	73,315	64.2
Republican	Toni Thompson	40,904	35.8
Total votes		114,219	100.0
Democratic hold			

=== 1996 ===
1996 California State Assembly 8th district election
Party	Candidate	Votes	%
Democratic	Helen Thomson (incumbent)	75,010	55.8
Republican	Ed Schlenker	51,707	38.5
Libertarian	Harold J. Helbock	7,728	5.7
Total votes		134,445	100.0
Democratic hold			

=== 1994 ===
1994 California State Assembly 8th district election
Party	Candidate	Votes	%
Democratic	Tom Hannigan (incumbent)	62,135	55.3
Republican	Bryant J. Stocking	50,282	44.7
Total votes		112,417	100.0
Democratic hold			

=== 1992 ===
1992 California State Assembly 8th district election
Party	Candidate	Votes	%
Democratic	Thomas M. Hannigan (incumbent)	83,839	57.5
Republican	John W. Ford	53,509	36.7
Libertarian	Richard Fields	8,307	5.7
No party	Jeanne Patrick (write-in)	181	0.1
Total votes		145,836	100.0
Democratic gain from Republican			

=== 1990 ===
1990 California State Assembly 8th district election
Party	Candidate	Votes	%
Republican	Bev Hansen (incumbent)	94,722	76.5
Libertarian	Eric W. Roberts	29,101	23.5
Total votes		123,823	100.0
Republican hold			

== See also ==
- California State Assembly
- California State Assembly districts
- Districts in California
