= Jackie Elward =

American politician

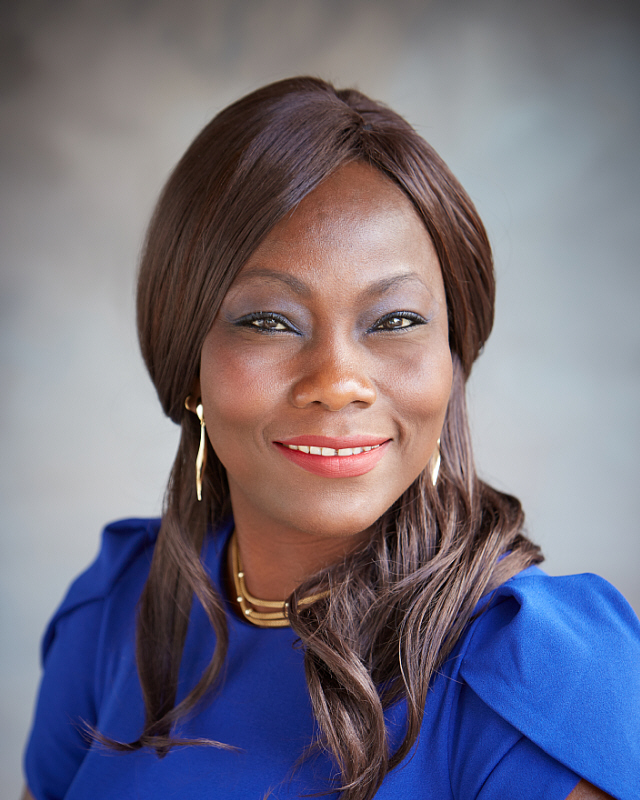

Member-elect of the California State Assembly from the 12th district
- Assuming office January 2027
- Succeeding: Damon Connolly

Mayor of Rohnert Park, California
- In office 2021–2022

Personal details
- Born: February 25, 1979 (age 47) Kikwit, Zaire (now Democratic Republic of Congo)
- Party: Democratic
- Spouse: John Ryan Elward
- Children: 3

Jackie Elward (born February 25, 1979) is an American politician. She is the Democratic member-elect of the California State Assembly from the 12th district. Prior to her victory, she was a member of Rohnert Park City Council, serving as mayor from 2021 to 2022, and a teacher at a French immersion school.

== Biography ==
Elward was born on February 25, 1979, in Kikwit, at the time in Zaire (now the Democratic Republic of Congo. She obtained a theology degree from the Institut Biblique de Kinshasa and bachelor degree in sociology from California State University, Chico.

In 2015, Elward began working at Santa Rosa French Immersion School, where she became instructional assistant. She is also a labor organizer, including at California School Employees Association Local 75. She also started Les Enfants Baobab, a nonprofit which helped about a dozen homeless children in Kinshasa, and in June 2020 organized a George Floyd protest in Rohnert Park. She helped collect signatures for 2026 California Proposition 40, which would have imposed a one-time wealth tax on billionaires.

Elward is a board member of the North Bay Jobs with Justice coalition.

=== Local politics ===
In 2020, Elward was elected to Rohnert Park City Council; she is the city's first Black woman council. In 2021, she received a racist phone call in protest of her support on banning fireworks. She served as city's vice mayor in 2021 and as mayor from December 2021 to 2022. Her work as council member includes addressing homelessness by devolving that issue to a new community emergency response team and eliminating every encampment.

=== Statewide politics ===
In May 2023, Elward announced that she would run in next year's California State Senate election to replace term-limited Bill Dodd in the 3rd district. later explaining that "our region needs a champion for the people in the state Senate, someone who is ready to be a voice for everyone in our district". She placed in third-place in the primary and did not advance to the general election.

Elward ran as a Democratic candidate for California's 12th State Assembly district in the 2026 election. She cited the United States affordability crisis as a main issue for the district, and voiced support for a moratorium on constructing large data centers. She advanced from the June primary with another Democratic candidate, Marin County Supervisor Eric Lucan, after late-arriving ballots pushed her to second place. Cara Brown McCormick of Independent Voter News stated that Lucan was relatively moderate compared to the progressive Elward, and that the general election would be a divide between business and labor union interests.

In the November general election, Elward defeated Lucan in an upset. Elward declared victory, and Lucan, conceded to her, though ballot counting had not been completed.

Elward lives in Rohnert Park with her husband, labor organizer John Ryan Elward, and their three children. She is a fluent speaker of six languages. She obtained a Bachelor of Science in criminal justice from Central State University while on the council.
