= Bert Alford Cassidy =

American politician

Member of the California Senate from the 3rd district
- In office January 7, 1929 – January 2, 1933
- Preceded by: Thomas Ingram
- Succeeded by: Harry A. Perry

Personal details
- Born: May 19, 1889 Chippewa Falls, Wisconsin, U.S.
- Died: January 20, 1950 (aged 60) Auburn, California, U.S.
- Party: Republican
- Children: 4

Military service
- Branch/service: United States Army
- Battles/wars: World War I

Bert Alford Cassidy (May 19, 1889 - January 20, 1950) served in the California Senate for the 3rd District from 1929 to 1933 and during World War I he served in the United States Army.
