= Lois Wolk =

American politician (born 1946)

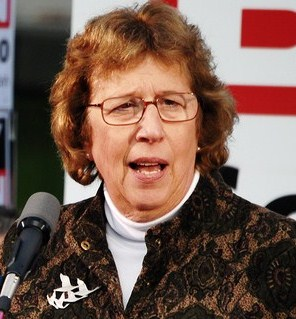

Member of the California State Senate
- In office December 1, 2008 – November 30, 2016
- Preceded by: Michael Machado
- Succeeded by: Bill Dodd
- Constituency: 5th district (2008–12); 3rd district (2012–16)

Member of the California State Assembly from the 8th district
- In office December 2, 2002 – November 30, 2008
- Preceded by: Helen Thomson
- Succeeded by: Mariko Yamada

Personal details
- Born: May 12, 1946 (age 80) Philadelphia, Pennsylvania
- Party: Democratic
- Spouse: Bruce
- Children: Dan; Adam
- Education: Antioch College (BA); Johns Hopkins University (MA)
- Profession: Teacher

Lois Wolk (born May 12, 1946) is an American politician and former member of the California State Senate. A Democrat, she represented the 3rd Senate District, which encompasses the Sacramento–San Joaquin River Delta region and portions of the North Bay.

Wolk was a member of the California Legislative Jewish Caucus. Before being elected to the State Senate in 2008, she served in the California State Assembly, where she represented the 8th Assembly District, and the 5th Assembly District after the 2010 redistricting. She is also a former member of both the Yolo County Board of Supervisors and the Davis City Council.

== Early life ==
Wolk was born in Philadelphia, Pennsylvania. She earned a B.A. from Antioch College in 1968, and an M.A. from Johns Hopkins School of Advanced International Studies in 1971. She has taught history, Social Studies and French in grades 7 through 12 in both public and private schools. Wolk lives in Davis, California with her husband, Bruce Wolk, formerly a Professor of Law at UC Davis Law School. They married in 1968 and have two sons, Adam and Dan. Dan is the former mayor of Davis, California.

== Political career ==
Wolk won a seat on the Davis City Council in 1990, and served two terms as Mayor from 1992 to 1994 and 1996 to 1998. She then served as Yolo County Supervisor from 1998 to 2002, chairing the Board in 2000.

Wolk was elected to the California State Assembly in 2002, and won re-election in 2004 and 2006.

Wolk was Chair of the Assembly Water, Parks and Wildlife Committee and she served on Assembly Committees on Budget, Local Government, and Natural Resources, as well as the Budget Subcommittee on Transportation and Information Technology. In addition, Wolk served on numerous Select Committees including Biotechnology; California Children's School Readiness and Health; Domestic Violence; Growth and Infrastructure; Ports; Water, Infrastructure and the Economy; Rural Economic Development; and Wine.

In her five years in the Assembly, Wolk succeeded in authoring 56 new laws. In 2007, Governor Arnold Schwarzenegger signed many Wolk-authored bills including legislation to improve flood protection in flood-prone areas of California's Central Valley; improve safety on a treacherous stretch of State Highway 12; require more planning for state parks and recreation opportunities for the Central Valley; and provide the Department of Fish and Game with the authority to control highly invasive species that threaten California's water delivery and natural ecosystems.

Wolk has been honored by many organizations for her public service, including the Planning and Conservation League, which named Wolk its 2007 Legislator of the Year for her leadership in water policy and legislation, and for championing a landmark package of flood protection bills to strengthen flood protection in California's Central Valley and Sacramento-San Joaquin Delta region.

In 2007, both the Highway 12 Association and Solano Transportation Authority honored Wolk for her tireless work to develop a Highway 12 safety package with the California Department of Transportation and California Highway Patrol, and for authoring legislation to establish a safety enhancement double fine zone on a dangerous stretch of State Highway Route 12.

Wolk termed out of the Assembly in 2008 and was succeeded by Mariko Yamada.

In 2008, Wolk ran for the California State Senate in the 5th district, the seat held by Michael Machado. Wolk defeated her Republican opponent, fellow assembly-member Greg Aghazarian of Stockton.

In 2015, Wolk co-sponsored, with Bill Monning, the SB-128 California End of Life Option Act which allows residents of California who meet strict criteria to exercise their right to die through medical aid in dying.

Wolk was termed out in 2016 and was succeeded by Bill Dodd.

Work, who is Jewish, is a member of the California Legislative Jewish Caucus.
