= Gordon A. Fleury =

American politician

Member of the California State Assembly from the 8th district
- In office January 3, 1949 - August 28, 1955
- Preceded by: Chester M. Gannon
- Succeeded by: Thomas Jamison MacBride

Personal details
- Born: February 29, 1916 Glendale, California
- Died: November 2, 1987 (aged 71) Sacramento, California
- Party: Republican
- Spouse: Shirley M. Winter (after 1936)
- Children: 3
- Education: Sacramento Junior College; UC Hastings College of the Law

Military service
- Allegiance: United States
- Branch/service: United States Navy
- Years of service: 1941-1945
- Battles/wars: World War II

Gordon A. Fleury (February 29, 1916 - November 2, 1987) served in the California State Assembly as a Republican during the 1940s and early 1950s. During World War II he served in the United States Navy.
