= Mariko Yamada =

American politician (born 1950)

- 山田真理子
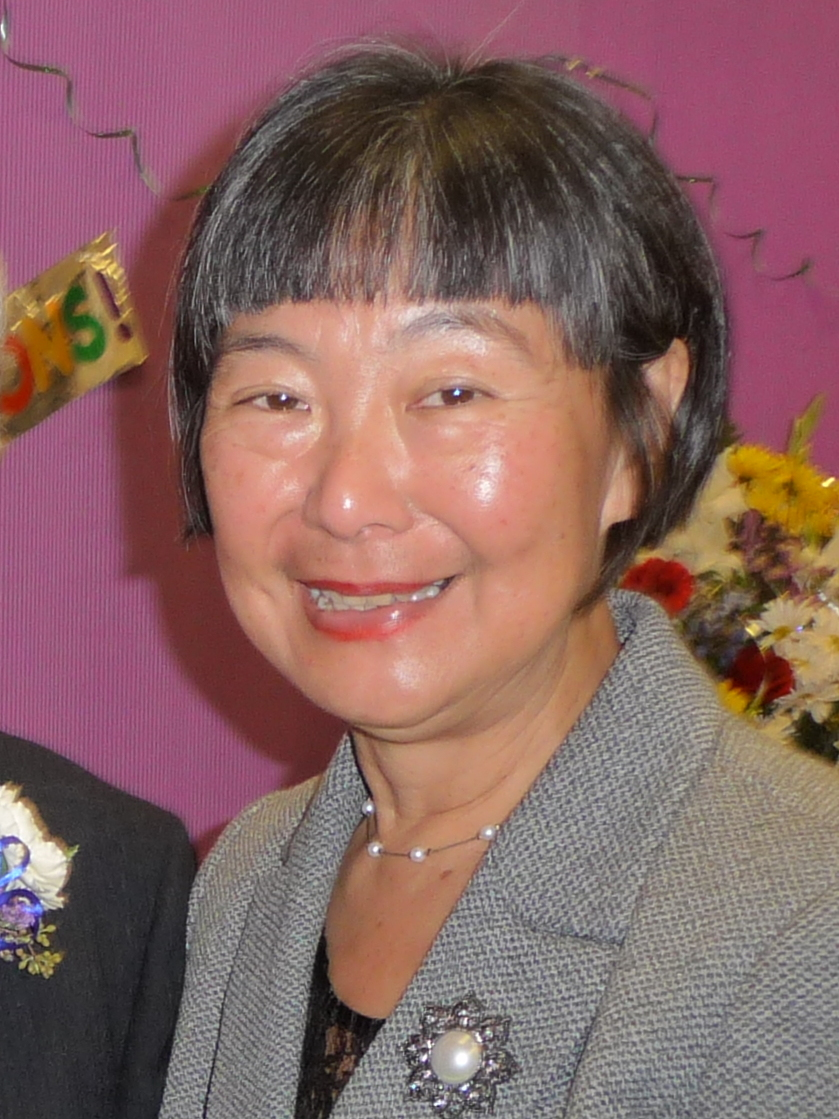

Member of the California State Assembly from the 4th district 8th district (2008–2012)
- In office December 1, 2008 – November 30, 2014
- Preceded by: Lois Wolk
- Succeeded by: Bill Dodd

Personal details
- Born: October 23, 1950 (age 75) Denver, Colorado, U.S.
- Party: Democratic
- Spouse: Janlee Wong
- Children: Meilee; Midori
- Education: University of Colorado; University of Southern California
- Occupation: Social Worker/Civil servant

Mariko Yamada (born October 23, 1950) is a Japanese-American social worker who served as the Democratic assemblywoman from California's 4th Assembly district from 2008 to 2014.

== Personal ==
Both of Yamada's parents were held in Japanese internment camps during World War II. Yamada grew up attending inner-city schools and later became the first member of her family to complete college and graduate school. She lives in Davis with her husband, Janlee Wong. They have two children — Meilee and Midori.

== Education ==
Yamada received her undergraduate degree from the University of Colorado Boulder and received her master's degree in social work from the University of Southern California.

== Political career ==
Prior to serving in the Assembly, Yamada represented the city of Davis on the Yolo County Board of Supervisors from 2003-2008.

She was elected in 2008 after defeating West Sacramento Mayor Christopher Cabaldon in a competitive Democratic primary, a victory that many considered an upset for Yamada. She was the third consecutive woman from Davis to be elected to this seat, following in the footsteps of Helen Thomson and Lois Wolk.

In 2016, Yamada lost the election for the seat representing California's 3rd State Senate district to Bill Dodd.

== Career ==
Yamada's experience includes a decade in Washington, D.C. in federal service, first with the U.S. Census Bureau working on the undercount reduction campaign of the 1980 Census. She later worked as an investigator with Civil Rights division of the United States Department of Commerce. She also co-produced and co-hosted "Gold Mountain, D.C.", a jazz and information show on WPFW 89.3 FM.
