= Thomas M. Hannigan =

American politician (1940–2018)

Director of the California Department of Water Resources
- In office March 1, 1999 – June 1, 2003
- Governor: Gray Davis
- Preceded by: David N. Kennedy
- Succeeded by: Michael J. Spear

Majority Leader of the California Assembly
- In office December 1, 1986 – June 5, 1995
- Preceded by: Mike Roos
- Succeeded by: Jim Brulte

Member of the California State Assembly
- In office December 4, 1978 – November 30, 1996
- Preceded by: Vic Fazio
- Succeeded by: Helen Thomson
- Constituency: 4th district (1978–1992); 8th district (1992–1996)

Personal details
- Born: May 30, 1940 Vallejo, California, U.S.
- Died: October 9, 2018 (aged 78) Fairfield, California, U.S.
- Party: Democratic
- Spouse: Jan Mape (m. 1963; died 2006)
- Children: 3
- Education: Santa Clara University

Military service
- Allegiance: United States
- Branch/service: United States Marine Corps
- Years of service: 1963-1966
- Rank: Captain
- Battles/wars: Vietnam War

Thomas M. Hannigan (May 30, 1940 – October 9, 2018) was an American businessman and politician.

== Biography ==
Hannigan was born in Vallejo, California. He served in the United States Marine Corps from 1963 to 1966 and was commissioned a captain. In 1962, he graduated from Santa Clara University. He moved to Fairfield, California and was in the real estate business. He served on the Fairfield City Council from 1970 to 1974 and as mayor of Fairfield from 1972 to 1974. Hannigan also served on the Solano County Board of Supervisors from 1974 to 1978 and served as chair of the board of supervisors. Hannigan served in the California State Assembly from December 4, 1978 - November 30, 1996 and was a Democrat. From 1999 to 2003, Hannigan served as the director of the California Department of Water Resources.

The Fairfield–Vacaville station is named in his honor.

Hannigan's daughter, Erin Hannigan Andrews, is the Supervisor of Solano County.
