= California's 4th State Assembly district =

American legislative district

Current assemblymember
Cecilia Aguiar-Curry; D–Winters
- Population: 474,729
- Demographics: 50% White; 2.0% Black; 33.6% Latino; 8.9% Asian; 0.8% Native American; 0.3% Hawaiian/Pacific Islander; 0.6% other; 5.0% remainder of multiracial
- Registration: 46.61% Democratic; 23.86% Republican; 24.07% No party preference

California's 4th State Assembly district is one of 80 California State Assembly districts. It is currently represented by Democrat Cecilia Aguiar-Curry of Winters.

== District profile ==
The district encompasses much of the southern and western Sacramento Valley and Wine Country. The Coast Ranges run down the western half of the district.

Colusa County – 100%

- Arbuckle
- Williams

Lake County – 100%

- Clearlake
- Lakeport

Napa County – 100%

- American Canyon
- Calistoga
- Napa
- St. Helena
- Yountville

Sonoma County – 6.20%

- Boyes Hot Springs
- Sonoma

Yolo County – 100%

- Davis
- Winters
- Woodland
- West Sacramento

== Election results from statewide races ==
Year	Office	Results
2024	President	Harris 63.3 – 33.4%
2021	Recall	No 65.1 – 34.9%
2020	President	Biden 66.3 – 31.2%
2018	Governor	Newsom 63.9 – 36.1%
2018	Senator	Feinstein 51.5 – 48.5%
2016	President	Clinton 62.8 – 29.8%
2016	Senator	Harris 67.2 – 32.8%
2014	Governor	Brown 66.4 – 33.6%
2012	President	Obama 63.2 – 33.9%
2012	Senator	Feinstein 65.7 – 34.3%

== List of assembly members representing the district ==
Due to redistricting, the 4th district has been moved around different parts of the state. The current iteration resulted from the 2021 redistricting by the California Citizens Redistricting Commission.

Assembly members	Party	Years served	Counties represented	Notes
John Yule	Republican	January 5, 1885 – January 3, 1887	Shasta, Trinity	
Thaddeus Wilton Huff Shanahan	Democratic	January 3, 1887 – January 2, 1893	Shasta, Trinity	
William P. Mathews	Democratic	January 2, 1893 – January 7, 1895	Tehama, Trinity	
Daniel Garrard Reid	Democratic	January 7, 1895 – January 4, 1897	Tehama, Trinity	
Frank Houghton	Democratic	January 4, 1897 – January 2, 1899	Tehama, Trinity	
W. H. La Bare	Republican	January 2, 1899 – January 5, 1901	Tehama, Trinity	
H. S. Gans	Republican	January 5, 1901 – January 5, 1903	Tehama, Trinity	
George Adolf Grotefend	Democratic	January 5, 1903 – January 2, 1905	Lassen, Modoc, Shasta	
J. H. Creighton	Republican	January 2, 1905 – January 7, 1907	Lassen, Modoc, Shasta	
Nathan A. Cornish	Republican	January 7, 1907 – January 4, 1909	Lassen, Modoc, Shasta	
Arthur M. Dean	Republican	January 4, 1909 – January 2, 1911	Lassen, Modoc, Shasta	
James Halar Tibbits	Republican	January 2, 1911 – January 6, 1913	Lassen, Modoc, Shasta	
Albert Franklin Shartel	Republican	January 6, 1913 – January 8, 1917	Plumas, Lassen, Modoc, Sierra	
Arthur Joseph Mathews	Republican	January 8, 1917 – January 3, 1921	Plumas, Lassen, Modoc, Sierra	
Franklin J. Powers	Republican	January 3, 1921 – January 8, 1923	Plumas, Lassen, Modoc, Sierra	
Arthur Joseph Mathews	Republican	January 8, 1923 – January 5, 1925	Plumas, Lassen, Modoc, Sierra	
N. V. Wemple	Republican	January 5, 1925 – January 7, 1929	Plumas, Lassen, Modoc, Sierra	
Forrest R. Young	Democratic	January 7, 1929 – January 5, 1931	Plumas, Lassen, Modoc, Sierra	
Edwin Albert McDaniel	Democratic	January 5, 1931 – January 2, 1933	Colusa, Glenn, Tehama	
John Evangelist Frazier	Republican	January 2, 1933 – January 4, 1937	Butte Sutter, Yuba County, California	
Seth Millington	Democratic	January 4, 1937 – January 4, 1943	Butte Sutter, Yuba County, California	
Albert M. King	Democratic	January 4, 1943 – January 6, 1947	Butte Sutter, Yuba County, California	
Bert Willits Loomis	Republican	January 6, 1947 – January 3, 1949	Butte Sutter, Yuba County, California	
Arthur William Coats Jr.	Democratic	January 3, 1949 – January 5, 1953	Butte Sutter, Yuba County, California	
Don Hobbie	Republican	January 5, 1953 – September 20, 1955	Butte Sutter, Yuba County, California	Died in office from a heart attack.
Vacant		September 20, 1955 – October 17, 1955	Butte Sutter, Yuba County, California	
Harold Thomas Sedgwick	Republican	October 17, 1955 – January 7, 1963	Butte Sutter, Yuba County, California	He was sworn in after the death of his predecessor after winning the special election.
Harold E. Booth	Democratic	January 7, 1963 - January 4, 1965	Butte, Colusa, Sutter, Glenn, Yolo	
Ray E. Johnson	Republican	January 4, 1965 – November 30, 1974	Butte, Colusa, Sutter, Glenn, Yolo	
Ray E. Johnson	Republican	January 4, 1965 – November 30, 1974	Butte, Colusa, Sutter, Glenn, Lake, Yolo	
Edwin L. Z'berg	Democratic	December 2, 1974 – August 26, 1975	Sacramento, Solano, Yolo	Died in office at his apartment from a heart attack.
Vacant		August 26, 1975 – December 10, 1975	Sacramento, Solano, Yolo	
Vic Fazio	Democratic	December 10, 1975 – November 30, 1978	Sacramento, Solano, Yolo	He was sworn in after the death of his predecessor, after winning the special election.
Thomas M. Hannigan	Democratic	December 4, 1978 – November 30, 1992	Solano, Yolo	
David Knowles	Republican	December 7, 1992 – November 30, 1996	Alpine, Amador, Calaveras, El Dorado, Mono, Placer	
Rico Oller	Republican	December 2, 1996 – November 30, 2000	Alpine, Amador, Calaveras, El Dorado, Mono, Placer	
Tim Leslie	Republican	December 4, 2000 – November 30, 2006	Alpine, Amador, Calaveras, El Dorado, Mono, Placer	
Tim Leslie	Republican	December 4, 2000 – November 30, 2006	Alpine, El Dorado, Placer, Sacramento	
Ted Gaines	Republican	December 4, 2006 – January 6, 2011	Alpine, El Dorado, Placer, Sacramento	Resigned after winning the State Senate special election in the 1st district and eventually succeeded by his wife.
Vacant		January 6, 2011 – May 12, 2011	Alpine, El Dorado, Placer, Sacramento	
Beth Gaines	Republican	May 12, 2011 – November 30, 2012	Alpine, El Dorado, Placer, Sacramento	Won the 2011 special election in her husband's district.
Mariko Yamada	Democratic	December 3, 2012 – November 30, 2014	Colusa, Lake, Napa, Solano, Sonoma, Yolo	
Bill Dodd	Democratic	December 1, 2014 – November 30, 2016	Colusa, Lake, Napa, Solano, Sonoma, Yolo	
Cecilia Aguiar-Curry	Democratic	December 5, 2016 – present	Colusa, Lake, Napa, Solano, Sonoma, Yolo	
Cecilia Aguiar-Curry	Democratic	December 5, 2016 – present	Colusa, Lake, Napa, Sonoma, Yolo	

== Election results (1990–present) ==
=== 2024 ===
2024 California State Assembly 4th district election
Primary election
Party	Candidate	Votes	%
Democratic	Cecilia Aguiar-Curry (incumbent)	78,623	99.3
Republican	Darren Ellis (write-in)	525	0.6
Democratic	Sherman McFarland (write-in)	102	0.1
Total votes		79,250	100.0
General election
Democratic	Cecilia Aguiar-Curry (incumbent)	133,421	66.5
Republican	Darren Ellis	67,277	33.5
Total votes		200,698	100.0
Democratic hold			

=== 2022 ===
2022 California State Assembly 4th district election
Primary election
Party	Candidate	Votes	%
Democratic	Cecilia Aguiar-Curry (incumbent)	70,593	67.1
Republican	Bryan Pritchard	34,532	32.8
No party preference	Susan G. Pelican (write-in)	36	0.0
Total votes		105,161	100.0
General election
Democratic	Cecilia Aguiar-Curry (incumbent)	99,342	64.9
Republican	Bryan Pritchard	53,734	35.1
Total votes		153,076	100.0
Democratic hold			

=== 2020 ===
2020 California State Assembly 4th district election
Primary election
Party	Candidate	Votes	%
Democratic	Cecilia Aguiar-Curry (incumbent)	83,861	58.5
Republican	Matthew L. Nelson	42,960	30.0
Democratic	Sophia Racke	16,570	11.6
Total votes		143,391	100.0
General election
Democratic	Cecilia Aguiar-Curry (incumbent)	150,157	66.7
Republican	Matthew L. Nelson	75,110	33.3
Total votes		225,267	100.0
Democratic hold			

=== 2018 ===
2018 California State Assembly 4th district election
Primary election
Party	Candidate	Votes	%
Democratic	Cecilia Aguiar-Curry (incumbent)	77,882	99.5
Libertarian	Brandon Z. Nelson (write-in)	132	0.2
Republican	Cherylyn A. Nutting (write-in)	130	0.2
Green	Sarah Joan Fulton (write-in)	128	0.2
Total votes		78,272	100.0
General election
Democratic	Cecilia Aguiar-Curry (incumbent)	122,657	75.2
Libertarian	Brandon Z. Nelson	40,398	24.8
Total votes		163,055	100.0
Democratic hold			

=== 2016 ===
2016 California State Assembly 4th district election
Primary election
Party	Candidate	Votes	%
Democratic	Cecilia Aguiar-Curry	36,043	29.2
Republican	Charlie Schaupp	35,454	28.7
Democratic	Dan Wolk	31,405	25.4
Democratic	Don Saylor	18,284	14.8
Democratic	Elmer Mark Kropp	2,281	1.8
Total votes		123,467	100.0
General election
Democratic	Cecilia Aguiar-Curry	118,772	63.5
Republican	Charlie Schaupp	68,170	36.5
Total votes		186,942	100.0
Democratic hold			

=== 2014 ===
2014 California State Assembly 4th district election
Primary election
Party	Candidate	Votes	%
Democratic	Bill Dodd	22,168	26.4
Republican	Charlie Schaupp	21,873	26.1
Democratic	Dan Wolk	19,963	23.8
Democratic	Joe Krovoza	14,993	17.9
Republican	Dustin Call	4,939	5.9
Total votes		83,936	100.0
General election
Democratic	Bill Dodd	70,598	61.6
Republican	Charlie Schaupp	43,981	38.4
Total votes		114,579	100.0
Democratic hold			

=== 2012 ===
2012 California State Assembly 4th district election
Primary election
Party	Candidate	Votes	%
Democratic	Mariko Yamada (incumbent)	51,821	59.2
Republican	John Munn	35,664	40.8
Total votes		87,485	100.0
General election
Democratic	Mariko Yamada (incumbent)	108,081	62.5
Republican	John Munn	64,946	37.5
Total votes		173,027	100.0
Democratic gain from Republican			

=== 2011 (special) ===
2011 California State Assembly 4th district special election Vacancy resulting from the resignation of Ted Gaines
Primary election
Party	Candidate	Votes	%
Democratic	Dennis Campanale	21,977	31.3
Republican	Beth Gaines	15,952	22.7
Republican	John Allard	15,226	21.7
Republican	Cheryl Bly-Chester	6,788	9.7
Republican	Michael F. O'Connor	3,929	5.6
Republican	Rob Matthews	2,753	3.9
Republican	Matt Williams	2,703	3.9
Republican	"Bo" Bogdan Ambrozewicz	877	1.2
Total votes		70,205	100.0
General election
Republican	Beth Gaines	41,144	55.6
Democratic	Dennis Campanale	32,878	44.4
Total votes		74,022	100.0
Republican hold			

=== 2010 ===
2010 California State Assembly 4th district election
Party	Candidate	Votes	%
Republican	Ted Gaines (incumbent)	109,672	58.8
Democratic	Dennis J. Campanale	68,306	36.6
Peace and Freedom	Daniel D. Frederick	8,647	4.6
Total votes		186,625	100.0
Republican hold			

=== 2008 ===
2008 California State Assembly 4th district election
Party	Candidate	Votes	%
Republican	Ted Gaines (incumbent)	166,736	100.0
Total votes		166,736	100.0
Republican hold			

=== 2006 ===
2006 California State Assembly 4th district election
Party	Candidate	Votes	%
Republican	Ted Gaines	96,958	58.8
Democratic	Robert Haswell	57,401	34.8
Libertarian	Michael Murphy	5,423	3.3
Green	Gerald Fritts	5,025	3.0
Total votes		164,807	100.0
Republican hold			

=== 2004 ===
2004 California State Assembly 4th district election
Party	Candidate	Votes	%
Republican	Tim Leslie (incumbent)	140,105	66.7
Democratic	Todd W. Schwenk	70,008	33.3
Total votes		210,113	100.0
Republican hold			

=== 2002 ===
2002 California State Assembly 4th district election
Party	Candidate	Votes	%
Republican	Tim Leslie (incumbent)	91,022	66.6
Democratic	Scott Warren	45,722	33.4
Total votes		136,744	100.0
Republican hold			

=== 2000 ===
2000 California State Assembly 4th district election
Party	Candidate	Votes	%
Republican	Tim Leslie	144,844	66.9
Democratic	Stephen A. Macola	71,492	33.1
Total votes		216,336	100.0
Republican hold			

=== 1998 ===
1998 California State Assembly 4th district election
Party	Candidate	Votes	%
Republican	Rico Oller (incumbent)	103,688	61.7
Democratic	Mark A. Norberg	57,492	34.2
Libertarian	Robert L. "Bob" Mulvany	6,980	4.2
Total votes		168,160	100.0
Republican hold			

=== 1996 ===
1996 California State Assembly 4th district election
Party	Candidate	Votes	%
Republican	Thomas "Rico" Oller	105,257	57.9
Democratic	Erike J. Young	76,193	41.9
No party	Karen Smith (write-in)	349	0.2
Total votes		181,799	100.0
Republican hold			

=== 1994 ===
1994 California State Assembly 4th district election
Party	Candidate	Votes	%
Republican	David Knowles (incumbent)	101,020	65.0
Democratic	Charles W. "Charlie" Fish	47,700	30.7
Libertarian	Clyde B. Smith	6,774	4.4
Total votes		155,494	100.0
Republican hold			

=== 1992 ===
1992 California State Assembly 4th district election
Party	Candidate	Votes	%
Republican	David Knowles (incumbent)	102,578	56.1
Democratic	Mark A. Norberg	64,400	35.2
Libertarian	Gary Hines	15,720	8.6
Total votes		182,698	100.0
Republican gain from Democratic			

=== 1990 ===
1990 California State Assembly 4th district election
Party	Candidate	Votes	%
Democratic	Thomas M. Hannigan (incumbent)	62,764	57.9
Republican	John W. Ford	38,582	35.6
Libertarian	Jack M. Presley	7,073	6.5
Total votes		108,419	100.0
Democratic hold			

== See also ==
- California State Assembly
- California State Assembly districts
- Districts in California
