= Bill Dodd (California politician) =

American politician (born 1956)

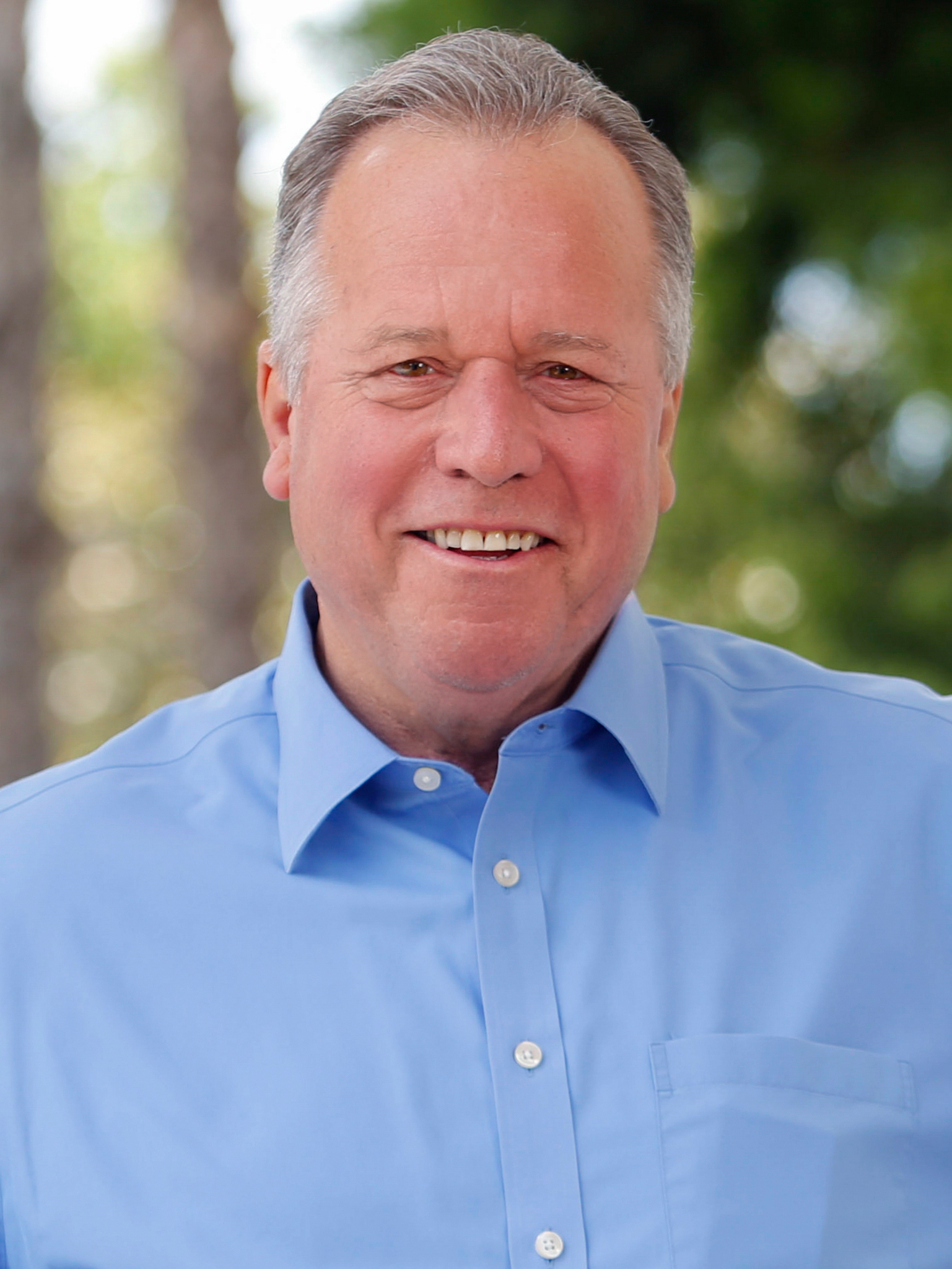
- Official portrait, 2019

Member of the California State Senate from the 3rd district
- In office December 5, 2016 – December 2, 2024
- Preceded by: Lois Wolk
- Succeeded by: Christopher Cabaldon

Member of the California State Assembly from the 4th district
- In office December 1, 2014 – December 5, 2016
- Preceded by: Mariko Yamada
- Succeeded by: Cecilia Aguiar-Curry

Member of the Napa County Board of Supervisors
- In office 2000–2014

Personal details
- Born: William Harold Dodd; June 10, 1956 (age 70) Napa, California, U.S.
- Party: Democratic (2013–present)
- Other political affiliations: Republican (before 2013)
- Spouse: Mary
- Children: 5
- Education: California State University, Chico

William Harold Dodd (born June 10, 1956) is an American politician who served in the California State Senate from 2016 to 2024. He is a member of the Democratic Party who previously represented the 3rd Senate district, which encompasses the northern San Francisco Bay Area and Delta region.

Prior to his election to the State Senate, Dodd served in the California State Assembly representing the 4th Assembly District, which includes all or portions of Yolo, Napa, Sonoma, Lake, Solano, and Colusa Counties. Before serving in the Assembly, he served on the Napa County Board of Supervisors.

== Business career ==
Prior to his time in elected office, Dodd was president and CEO of Diversified Water Systems, Inc. In 1978, Dodd earned a degree in Business Management from California State University, Chico.

During his time in the water industry, Dodd was active in the water quality industry's state and national trade associations. In 1985 he was elected President of the Pacific Water Quality Association and in 1994, elected to National Water Quality Association. During his tenure, the industry embraced third-party certification of water treatment products and lobbied in Sacramento on important legislation to protect consumers. He was awarded the PWQA and WQA Hall of Fame Award, Award of Merit for work in PR and Governmental affairs.

== Political career ==
Prior to serving in the Assembly, Bill served on the Napa County Board of Supervisors for 14 years. He also represented the cities and county of Napa on the Metropolitan Transportation Commission including a two-year term as chairman. In addition, Dodd served as an Honorary Commander for the 60th Air Mobility Wing at Travis Air Force Base. Other boards and commission service included the Chair of the Local Agency Formation Commission of Napa County, Chair of the Napa County League of Governments, Chair of the Napa County Transportation Planning Agency, and Chair of the Napa County Flood Control and Water Conservation District.

During his tenure as supervisor, Dodd worked with officials and the community to improve Napa's infrastructure, foster economic development while supporting workers, and protect community services for the county's most vulnerable. Dodd helped secure nearly $100 million in funding for the Jamison Canyon Road project (Highway 12) and transportation projects in the Napa, Solano and Sonoma County corridor.

In 2013, having previously been a registered Republican, Dodd changed his affiliation to the Democratic Party. In explaining the change, Dodd described himself as "a fiscal conservative but I agree with the Democratic viewpoint on most social issues". He also described himself as a pragmatist who parted company with the Republicans on the Board of Supervisors due to the outright opposition of the party to any tax increases, while Dodd supported a property tax increase to raise additional revenue.

In 2014 Dodd ran for the District 4 Assembly seat. After gaining the most votes in the primary, Dodd defeated Republican Charlie Schaupp in a run-off election. Dodd won the seat by a 62-38 percent margin. Dodd was named to the Transportation, Water, Parks and Wildlife, Business and Professions, Agriculture and Rules Committee.

Dodd declared his candidacy for the State Senate, District 3 in July 2015 and was endorsed by Governor Jerry Brown, Lt. Governor Gavin Newsom, Attorney General Kamala Harris and Secretary of State Alex Padilla, along with the majority of members in the Senate, Assembly and local elected officials. He defeated liberal Assemblywoman Mariko Yamada with 58% of the vote to win election to the Senate.

In March 2017 Dodd coauthored California Senate Bill 649, which would remove a city's ability to control where cell towers are placed and transfer the power to the state.

== Personal life ==
Dodd was born and raised in Napa County, where his family had 10 acres of farmland, dedicated to growing walnuts.

Dodd graduated from California State University, Chico in 1978, majoring in business administration.

Dodd serves on the boards of the Queen of the Valley Hospital Foundation, Justin-Siena High School, Health Care for the Poor Committee, Wolfe Center Youth Drug and Alcohol Center, Children's Health Initiative and is an honorary member of Hospice, Adult Day Services and Clinic Ole.

Dodd and wife Mary reside in Napa. As of 2017, they had five children and thirteen grandchildren.

== Electoral history ==
=== 2014 California State Assembly ===
California's 4th State Assembly district election, 2014
Primary election
| Party | Candidate | Votes | % |
|---|---|---|---|
| Democratic | Bill Dodd | 22,168 | 26.4 |
| Republican | Charlie Schaupp | 21,873 | 26.1 |
| Democratic | Dan Wolk | 19,963 | 23.8 |
| Democratic | Joe Krovoza | 14,993 | 17.9 |
| Republican | Dustin Call | 4,939 | 5.9 |
| Total votes | | 83,936 | 100.0 |
General election
| Democratic | Bill Dodd | 70,598 | 61.6 |
| Republican | Charlie Schaupp | 43,981 | 38.4 |
| Total votes | | 114,579 | 100.0 |
| Democratic hold | | | |

=== 2016 California State Senate ===
California State Senate election, 2016
Primary election
| Party | Candidate | Votes | % |
|---|---|---|---|
| Democratic | Bill Dodd | 90,396 | 37.4 |
| Democratic | Mariko Yamada | 72,243 | 29.9 |
| Republican | Greg "Coach" Coppes | 54,525 | 22.6 |
| Democratic | Gabe Griess | 24,540 | 10.2 |
| Total votes | | 241,704 | 100.0 |
General election
| Democratic | Bill Dodd | 207,927 | 58.1 |
| Democratic | Mariko Yamada | 149,701 | 41.9 |
| Total votes | | 357,628 | 100.0 |
| Democratic hold | | | |
