= Josh Hoover (politician) =

American politician

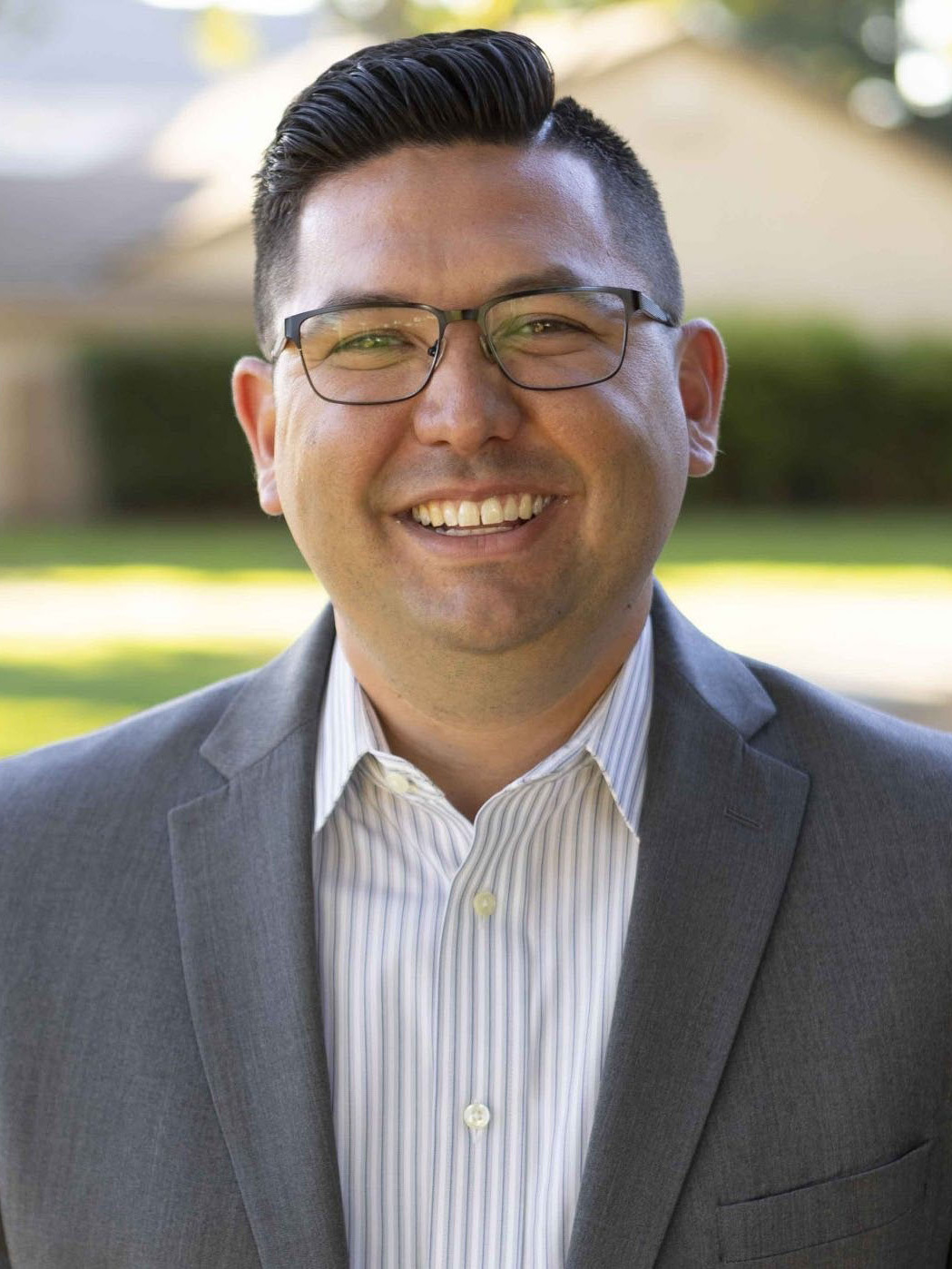
- Official portrait, 2023

Member of the California State Assembly from the 7th district
- Incumbent
- Assumed office December 5, 2022
- Preceded by: Ken Cooley
- Succeeded by: Amy Slavensky (elect)

Personal details
- Born: Joshua Ryan Hoover; April 11, 1988 (age 38) Fresno, California, U.S
- Party: Republican
- Spouse: Nicole Ferguson
- Children: 3

Josh Hoover is an American politician serving as a member of the California State Assembly from the 7th district, which includes the Sacramento County suburbs of Rancho Cordova, Fair Oaks, Folsom, and Citrus Heights. He assumed office on December 5, 2022 after defeating incumbent Democrat Ken Cooley in the November general election. Hoover was defeated for reelection in November 2026 after 2 terms by retired superintendent of schools Amy Slavensky.

== Early life and education ==
Hoover was born in Folsom, California. He earned a bachelor's degree in political science and public policy at the University of California, Los Angeles and a master's degree in public administration from the University of Southern California.

== Career ==
Hoover had worked as a legislative aide for 11 years. Prior to being elected to the State Assembly, Hoover was the Chief of Staff for California State Assemblymember Kevin Kiley. He also served on the Folsom Cordova Unified School Board. In January 2022, Hoover announced his campaign for the newly drawn 7th State Assembly district. He placed second in the nonpartisan blanket primary and defeated long-serving Democratic Assemblyman Ken Cooley in the November general election in an upset. In 2024, he won a second term over Citrus Heights City Councilwoman Porsche Middleton by a 54% to 46% margin.. In 2026, he co-authored a landmark bill prohibiting social-media sites from practices that have been labeled addictive to children. In 2026, Hoover ran for a third term in the assembly, but was ultimately defeated by educator Amy Slavensky.

== Personal life ==
Hoover lives in Folsom with his wife Nicole and their three children. He is Latino.

== Electoral history ==
=== 2022 ===
2022 California State Assembly 7th district election
Primary election
Party	Candidate	Votes	%
Democratic	Ken Cooley (incumbent)	56,949	50.9
Republican	Josh Hoover	38,001	34.0
Republican	Raymond Riehle	9,429	8.4
Republican	Jeffrey Erik Perrine	6,214	5.6
Republican	Quintin Toshi Levesque	1,249	1.1
Total votes		111,842	100.0
General election
Republican	Josh Hoover	83,768	50.4
Democratic	Ken Cooley (incumbent)	82,385	49.6
Total votes		166,153	100.0
Republican gain from Democratic			

2024 California State Assembly 7th district election
Primary election
Party	Candidate	Votes	%
Republican	Josh Hoover (incumbent)	59,398	52.7
Democratic	Porsche Middleton	33,045	29.3
Democratic	YK Chalamcherla	20,265	18.0
Total votes		112,708	100.0
General election
Republican	Josh Hoover (incumbent)	116,254	53.6
Democratic	Porsche Middleton	100,487	46.4
Total votes		216,741	100.0
Republican hold			
