= Great Valley Center =

US nonprofit organization

- Formation: 1997
- Founder: Carol Whiteside
- Founded at: California
- Type: Non-profit
- Purpose: serve California's Central Valley

The Great Valley Center is a nonprofit organization that supports activities and organizations benefiting the economic, social, and environmental well-being of California's Central Valley. The Great Valley Center operates leadership development programs, organizes conferences and regional events, and provides information and data to the public, nonprofits, policymakers and businesses. The organization has been described as a regional public-policy think tank.

== History ==
The Great Valley Center was founded by Carol Whiteside in 1997 to serve the Central Valley. The Great Valley Center was provided startup funds by the David and Lucile Packard Foundation, the James Irvine Foundation, and the William and Flora Hewlett Foundation. It is now affiliated with the University of California, Merced and continues to be supported by foundations, individuals, and corporations.

== Counties represented ==
- Colusa County
- El Dorado County
- Fresno County
- Glenn County
- Kern County
- Kings County
- Madera County
- Merced County
- Placer County
- Sacramento County
- San Joaquin County
- Shasta County
- Stanislaus County
- Sutter County
- Tehama County
- Tulare County
- Yolo County
- Yuba County

== Organization ==
The Great Valley Center is governed by a board of directors and run by the center's staff and partner organizations. These partner organizations include the University of California, Merced; businesses; foundations; other nonprofit organizations; faith-based organizations; community-based organizations; and local, state, regional, and federal government agencies. In addition, three Regional Advisory Boards and the Great Valley Center's Corporate Advisory Board support the Great Valley Center by providing feedback, information, resources, and advice. The three Regional Advisory Boards are the North Valley Advisory Board, the San Joaquin Valley Advisory Board, and the Sacramento Metropolitan Region Advisory Board. The Corporate Advisory Board is composed of firms and organizations interested in the Central Valley's well-being, including Citibank, AT&T, and Comcast.

== Research ==
The Renewable Energy Program has done research about renewable energy possibilities in the Central Valley. The research focused on the need for renewable energy, its benefits, its economic feasibility, and its practical implementation. Some groups that have used these reports include government, nonprofit, and commodity organizations.

In 2001, The Great Valley Center produced the Central Valley Survey in collaboration with the Public Policy Institute of California. The survey was designed to provide comprehensive, advocacy-free information on the opinions and public policy preferences of Central Valley residents. It also measured changes in these opinions over time and compared them with opinions of residents from other California regions. Some groups which used its data include government and nonprofit organizations.

The Great Valley Center produces indicator reports which collect statistics measuring the quality of life of Central Valley residents in a way that is easy for laypeople to understand. The reports compare the Central Valley against the state, other regions in California, and certain benchmarks, and recommend strategies for addressing the challenges of the Central Valley. Each report focuses on one of five different areas: the economy, the environment, community well-being, public health and access to care, and education and youth preparedness. The reports are produced roughly once a year on a five-report cycle. Some groups which use these data include government, nonprofit, and legal organizations.

== Programs ==
=== Current programs ===
The Citi Success Fund, which is funded by Citibank, is a subset of the Land use, Economic development, Growth, Agriculture, Conservation, and Investment (LEGACI) grant program. The fund provides small cash grants to K-12 educators who develop programs which encourage at-risk students to stay in school. Only programs in certain subregions of the Central Valley are eligible and priority is given to programs which train students in financial literacy, teach them about career options, or help them search and apply for colleges.

The Agricultural Transactions Program (ATP) primarily funds conservation-related transactions in Yolo, Merced, and Stanislaus Counties, such as easements, fee title purchase and resale, purchase options on land, and purchase subdivision map entitlements. It also provides technical assistance and training to partner communities. educates land owners, land trusts, and land use professionals about how voluntary agricultural easements can be a profitable way to continue farming in areas with urban development pressures.

The Great Valley Leadership Institute (GVLI) is a week-long leadership program for local elected officials. These officials must be serving on Boards of Supervisors, City Councils, and School Boards and must have been in office for at least one year.

The Institute for the Development of Emerging Area Leaders (IDEAL) is a regional leadership program for members of the Sacramento and San Joaquin Valleys. It teaches its fellows how to make collaborative community decisions about public affairs and educates them about issues concerning land use, economics, agriculture and conservation in the Central Valley.

In addition to doing research on renewable energy possibilities in the Central Valley, the renewable energy program also organized a bus tour. The bus tour featured experts who talked about and using manure, biomass, wind, fuel cells, solar energy, and hydrogen as power sources, as well as designs of energy-efficient schools and homes.

Pixley Connect is a 3-year program bringing telecommunication access, education, and training to Pixley, a rural, predominantly Spanish-speaking community with below average income levels, education levels, and employment rates. The program aims to promote Pixley's economic development and improve the residents' quality of life. Some services Pixley Connect has provided to Pixley residents include computer access, high-speed internet, computer literacy training, and technical support classes.

=== Completed programs ===
The Land use, Economic development, Growth, Agriculture, Conservation, and Investment (LEGACI) grant program issued nearly $5,000,000 in grants to nonprofit groups, community organizations, and local governments in the Central Valley between 1999 and 2004. The LEGACI program has since narrowed in focus to become the Citi Success Fund.

The Central Valley Digital Network (CVDN) trained and deployed AmeriCorps*VISTA (VISTA) Members into nonprofit organizations in order to bring technology to members of low-income communities in the Central Valley* from 2001 to 2005. Specifically, VISTA members helped non-profits use technology to improve their service delivery, provided technology literacy training, helped build a community technology center, and organized other technology-related projects.

Grant Advisory Boards for Youth gave Central Valley teenagers grant-making decisions in their communities between 2002 and 2005.

Community-based Assistance Programs sponsored a series of workshops for nonprofit organizations in San Joaquin, Stanislaus and Merced Counties until 2005. These workshops were designed to help nonprofits in three ways. First, they provided capacity building by facilitating technical assistance, training opportunities, and grant support. Second, they strengthened the infrastructure of capacity building resources by increasing access to support services, improving the regional distribution of existing resources, increasing the quantity and quality of capacity building assistance, and increasing the range of services available. Third, they supported and encouraged philanthropic investment in capacity building by addressing the need for capacity building, increasing awareness of the strategic value of investment in capacity building, and by working with grant making institutions to make effective investments in capacity building.

New Valley CONNEXIONS was a group of projects focusing on rural telecommunications; technology as it relates to industry, home construction, and urban planning; Highway 99; mapping and GIS; public policy as it relates to education; agri-food; and health services.

The Community, Aspiration, Teamwork, Action, Policy, Understanding, Leadership and Training (CATAPULT) was a youth leadership program which ran from 2003 to 2005. Five community partner organizations taught students leadership skills through retreats and policy-related community service projects.

The Great Valley Fellows Program was a program designed to teach college graduates about public policy issues facing the Central Valley. The program consisted of coursework, community immersion, apprenticeships, seminars, meetings with policy experts, tours, and training on facilitation, public speaking, and policy analysis.

== Conferences and events ==
The Great Valley Center organizes an Annual Conference featuring seminars about issues facing the Central Valley. Past topics have included land use, transportation, green building design, air quality, water, healthcare, youth, and education. Experts, policymakers, organizations, and residents attend and participate.

The Great Valley Center organizes the Sacramento Valley Forum, which focuses on issues and interests of the Sacramento Valley, such as air quality, transportation and flooding. Business and community leaders, government officials, farmers, environmentalists, and others attend.

The Great Valley Center is involved with several projects of the California Partnership for the San Joaquin Valley: the center is responsible for four of its workgroups, organizes its annual summit, and produces its annual report. The Center leads the Advanced Communications Services workgroup; the Land Use, Housing, and Agriculture workgroup; and the Transportation workgroup. It also is jointly responsible for the Energy workgroup.

The Great Valley Center is involved with several projects of the San Joaquin Valley Blueprint, including convening meetings and regional summits, publishing the e-newsletter, and coordinating media efforts.

== Awards ==
In 1990, the Great Valley Center received the Olmsted medal by the American Society of Landscape Architects for environmental leadership, vision, and stewardship.

In 2008, the Great Valley Center received one of the Wilmer Shields Rich Awards for Excellence in Communications by the Council on Foundations. The center received the Gold Award in the Special Report category for its publication Our Valley. Our Choice.
