= 1990 California State Assembly election =

1990 California election

- November 6, 1990

All 80 seats in the California State Assembly 41 seats needed for a majority
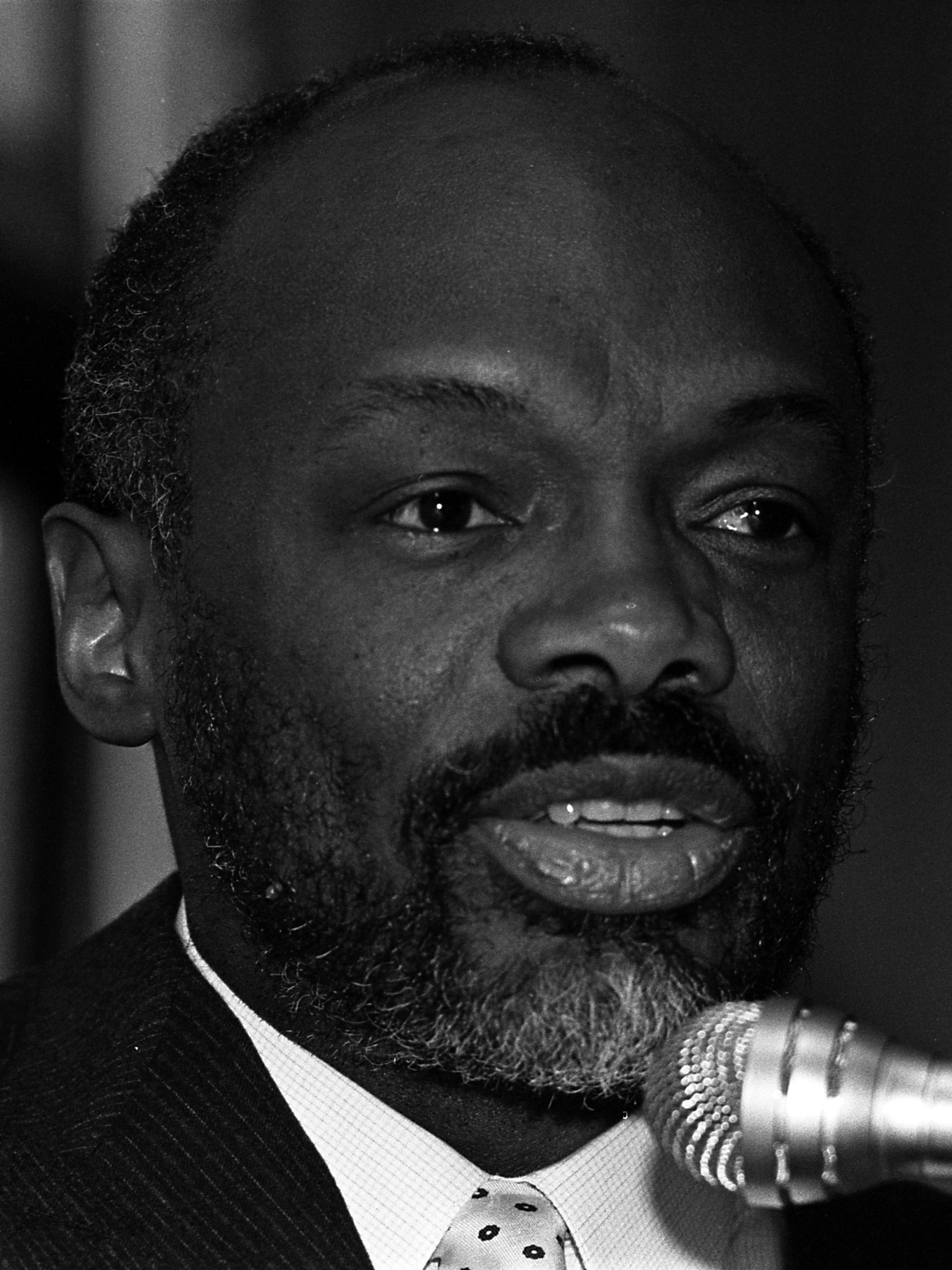

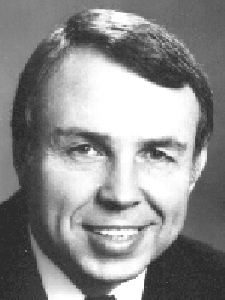
	Majority party	Minority party
Leader	Willie Brown	Ross Johnson
Party	Democratic	Republican
Leader's seat	13th–San Francisco	64th-Fullerton
Last election	46	34
Seats won	48	32
Seat change	▲2	▼2
Popular vote	3,560,787	3,187,240
Percentage	50.32%	45.04%
Speaker before election
Willie Brown
Democratic
Elected Speaker
Willie Brown
Democratic

The 1990 California State Assembly elections were held on November 6, 1990. California's State Assembly in its entirety comes up for election in even numbered years. Each seat has a two-year term and members are limited to three 2-year terms (six years). All 80 biennially elected seats in the Assembly were up for election this year.

== Overview ==
California State Assembly elections, 1990
Party	Votes	Percentage	Incumbents	Open	Before	After	+/–
Democratic	3,560,787	50.32%	43	3	46	48	+2
Republican	3,187,240	45.04%	29	5	34	32	-2
Libertarian	233,852	3.30%	0	0	0	0	0
Peace and Freedom	85,233	1.20%	0	0	0	0	0
American Independent	4,878	0.07%	0	0	0	0	0
Write-ins	4,413	0.06%	0	0	0	0	0
Totals	7,076,403	100.00%	52	8	80	80	—

↓
48	32
Democratic	Republican

== Results ==
Final results from the California Secretary of State:

=== District 1 ===
California's 1st State Assembly district election, 1990
Party	Candidate	Votes	%
Republican	Stan Statham (incumbent)	68,755	56.54
Democratic	Arlie E. Candle	52,165	42.90
No party	Al Cunningham (write-in)	682	0.56
Total votes		121,602	100.00
Republican hold			

=== District 2 ===
California's 2nd State Assembly district election, 1990
Party	Candidate	Votes	%
Democratic	Dan Hauser (incumbent)	71,091	55.23
Republican	Tim Willis	40,431	31.41
Peace and Freedom	Bruce Anderson	17,204	13.36
Total votes		128,726	100.00
Democratic hold			

=== District 3 ===
California's 3rd State Assembly district election, 1990
Party	Candidate	Votes	%
Republican	Christopher Chandler (incumbent)	64,994	54.04
Democratic	Lon S. Hatamiya	55,277	45.96
Total votes		120,271	100.00
Republican hold			

=== District 4 ===
California's 4th State Assembly district election, 1990
Party	Candidate	Votes	%
Democratic	Thomas M. Hannigan (incumbent)	62,764	57.89
Republican	John W. Ford	38,582	35.59
Libertarian	Jack M. Presley	7,073	6.52
Total votes		108,419	100.00
Democratic hold			

=== District 5 ===
California's 5th State Assembly district election, 1990
Party	Candidate	Votes	%
Republican	Tim Leslie (incumbent)	82,757	62.49
Democratic	Joe Buonaiuto	49,682	37.51
Total votes		132,439	100.00
Republican hold			

=== District 6 ===
California's 6th State Assembly district election, 1990
Party	Candidate	Votes	%
Democratic	Lloyd Connelly (incumbent)	61,721	57.92
Republican	George Marsh	39,245	36.83
Libertarian	Barbara Engelhardt	5,590	5.25
Total votes		106,556	100.00
Democratic hold			

=== District 7 ===
California's 7th State Assembly district election, 1990
Party	Candidate	Votes	%
Republican	David Knowles	82,862	51.35
Democratic	Norman S. Waters (incumbent)	78,490	48.64
No party	Christopher Carrillo (write-in)	13	0.01
Total votes		161,365	100.00
Republican gain from Democratic			

=== District 8 ===
California's 8th State Assembly district election, 1990
Party	Candidate	Votes	%
Republican	Bev Hansen (incumbent)	94,722	76.50
Libertarian	Eric W. Roberts	29,101	23.50
Total votes		123,823	100.00
Republican hold			

=== District 9 ===
California's 9th State Assembly district election, 1990
Party	Candidate	Votes	%
Republican	Bill Filante (incumbent)	63,672	51.37
Democratic	Vivien Bronshvag	52,659	42.49
Libertarian	Bill Bright	4,699	3.79
Peace and Freedom	Coleman Persily	2,908	2.35
Total votes		123,938	100.00
Republican hold			

=== District 10 ===
California's 10th State Assembly district election, 1990
Party	Candidate	Votes	%
Democratic	Phillip Isenberg (incumbent)	69,138	56.03
Republican	Tom Griffen	47,377	38.40
Libertarian	Chris J. Rufer	6,870	5.57
Total votes		123,385	100.00
Democratic hold			

=== District 11 ===
California's 11th State Assembly district election, 1990
Party	Candidate	Votes	%
Democratic	Robert Campbell (incumbent)	72,567	100.00
Total votes		72,567	100.00
Democratic hold			

=== District 12 ===
California's 12th State Assembly district election, 1990
Party	Candidate	Votes	%
Democratic	Tom Bates (incumbent)	82,766	67.72
Republican	Jonathan Grear	31,853	26.06
Peace and Freedom	Marsha Feinland	7,605	6.22
Total votes		122,224	100.00
Democratic hold			

=== District 13 ===
California's 13th State Assembly district election, 1990
Party	Candidate	Votes	%
Democratic	Barbara Lee	52,860	79.44
Republican	Barbara M. Thomas	13,682	20.56
Total votes		66,542	100.00
Democratic hold			

=== District 14 ===
California's 14th State Assembly district election, 1990
Party	Candidate	Votes	%
Democratic	Johan Klehs (incumbent)	56,022	65.84
Republican	Don J. Grundmann	22,593	26.55
Libertarian	Wayne R. Nguyen	6,473	7.61
Total votes		85,088	100.00
Democratic hold			

=== District 15 ===
California's 15th State Assembly district election, 1990
Party	Candidate	Votes	%
Republican	Bill Baker (incumbent)	75,624	55.06
Democratic	Wendell H. Williams	61,725	44.94
Total votes		137,349	100.00
Republican hold			

=== District 16 ===
California's 16th State Assembly district election, 1990
Party	Candidate	Votes	%
Democratic	John Burton (incumbent)	57,557	100.00
Total votes		57,557	100.00
Democratic hold			

=== District 17 ===
California's 17th State Assembly district election, 1990
Party	Candidate	Votes	%
Democratic	Willie Brown (incumbent)	62,951	64.19
Republican	Terrence Faulkner	26,572	27.10
Libertarian	John Whisman	8,537	8.71
Total votes		98,060	100.00
Democratic hold			

=== District 18 ===
California's 18th State Assembly district election, 1990
Party	Candidate	Votes	%
Democratic	Delaine Eastin (incumbent)	65,654	100.00
Total votes		65,654	100.00
Democratic hold			

=== District 19 ===
California's 19th State Assembly district election, 1990
Party	Candidate	Votes	%
Democratic	Jackie Speier (incumbent)	53,359	100.00
Total votes		53,359	100.00
Democratic hold			

=== District 20 ===
California's 20th State Assembly district election, 1990
Party	Candidate	Votes	%
Democratic	Ted Lempert (incumbent)	71,386	63.41
Republican	James R. Rinehart	36,226	32.18
Libertarian	Christopher R. Inama	2,882	2.56
American Independent	Carl R. Sigmund	2,083	1.85
Total votes		112,577	100.00
Democratic hold			

=== District 21 ===
California's 21st State Assembly district election, 1990
Party	Candidate	Votes	%
Democratic	Byron Sher (incumbent)	62,719	70.94
Republican	Eric Garris	25,695	29.06
Total votes		88,414	100.00
Democratic hold			

=== District 22 ===
California's 22nd State Assembly district election, 1990
Party	Candidate	Votes	%
Republican	Chuck Quackenbush (incumbent)	65,365	59.04
Democratic	Bob Levy	38,382	34.67
Libertarian	Jon Petersen	6,968	6.29
Total votes		110,715	100.00
Republican hold			

=== District 23 ===
California's 23rd State Assembly district election, 1990
Party	Candidate	Votes	%
Democratic	John Vasconcellos (incumbent)	43,553	62.71
Republican	Monica A. Valladares	25,895	37.29
Total votes		69,448	100.00
Democratic hold			

=== District 24 ===
California's 24th State Assembly district election, 1990
Party	Candidate	Votes	%
Democratic	Dominic L. Cortese (incumbent)	48,549	56.20
Republican	Ron Granada	32,887	38.06
Libertarian	Bruce E. Sommer	4,966	5.74
Total votes		86,402	100.00
Democratic hold			

=== District 25 ===
California's 25th State Assembly district election, 1990
Party	Candidate	Votes	%
Democratic	Rusty Areias (incumbent)	52,725	63.42
Republican	Ben Gilmore	26,454	31.82
Libertarian	Mark Hinkle	3,953	4.76
Total votes		83,132	100.00
Democratic hold			

=== District 26 ===
California's 26th State Assembly district election, 1990
Party	Candidate	Votes	%
Democratic	Patrick Johnston (incumbent)	59,632	66.62
Republican	Bradley J. Keaster	27,409	30.62
Libertarian	Debra Klobs	2,471	2.76
Total votes		89,512	100.00
Democratic hold			

=== District 27 ===
California's 27th State Assembly district election, 1990
Party	Candidate	Votes	%
Democratic	Sal Cannella (incumbent)	48,324	51.15
Republican	Richard A. Lang	43,012	45.54
Libertarian	Roy Shimp	3,122	3.31
Total votes		94,458	100.00
Democratic hold			

=== District 28 ===
California's 28th State Assembly district election, 1990
Party	Candidate	Votes	%
Democratic	Sam Farr (incumbent)	80,558	71.51
Republican	West W. Walker	32,097	28.49
Total votes		112,655	100.00
Democratic hold			

=== District 29 ===
California's 29th State Assembly district election, 1990
Party	Candidate	Votes	%
Republican	Andrea Seastrand	74,769	65.20
Democratic	John Jay Lybarger	39,905	34.80
Total votes		114,674	100.00
Republican hold			

=== District 30 ===
California's 30th State Assembly district election, 1990
Party	Candidate	Votes	%
Democratic	Jim Costa (incumbent)	39,414	62.36
Republican	Gerald G. Hurt	23,793	37.64
Total votes		63,207	100.00
Democratic hold			

=== District 31 ===
California's 31st State Assembly district election, 1990
Party	Candidate	Votes	%
Democratic	Bruce Bronzan (incumbent)	54,977	100.00
Total votes		54,977	100.00
Democratic hold			

=== District 32 ===
California's 32nd State Assembly district election, 1990
Party	Candidate	Votes	%
Republican	Bill Jones (incumbent)	71,592	68.81
Democratic	Bernie McGoldrick	32,457	31.19
Total votes		104,049	100.00
Republican hold			

=== District 33 ===
California's 33rd State Assembly district election, 1990
Party	Candidate	Votes	%
Republican	Trice Harvey (incumbent)	56,113	100.00
Total votes		56,113	100.00
Republican hold			

=== District 34 ===
California's 34th State Assembly district election, 1990
Party	Candidate	Votes	%
Republican	Phil Wyman (incumbent)	82,329	76.12
Libertarian	Ronald Tisbert	25,831	23.88
Total votes		108,160	100.00
Republican hold			

=== District 35 ===
California's 35th State Assembly district election, 1990
Party	Candidate	Votes	%
Democratic	Jack O'Connell (incumbent)	60,126	66.95
Republican	Connie O'Shaughnessy	29,677	33.05
Total votes		89,803	100.00
Democratic hold			

=== District 36 ===
California's 36th State Assembly district election, 1990
Party	Candidate	Votes	%
Republican	Tom McClintock (incumbent)	66,081	58.58
Democratic	Ginnie Connell	40,356	35.77
Libertarian	David A. Harner	6,371	5.65
Total votes		112,808	100.00
Republican hold			

=== District 37 ===
California's 37th State Assembly district election, 1990
Party	Candidate	Votes	%
Republican	Cathie Wright (incumbent)	62,881	54.67
Democratic	Dennis A. Petrie	44,773	38.93
Libertarian	John R. Spooner, Sr.	7,356	6.40
Total votes		115,010	100.00
Republican hold			

=== District 38 ===
California's 38th State Assembly district election, 1990
Party	Candidate	Votes	%
Republican	Paula Boland	50,496	52.97
Democratic	Irene F. Allert	41,578	43.61
Peace and Freedom	Charles D. Najbergier	3,268	3.42
Total votes		95,342	100.00
Republican hold			

=== District 39 ===
California's 39th State Assembly district election, 1990
Party	Candidate	Votes	%
Democratic	Richard Katz (incumbent)	37,813	67.63
Republican	Sam Ceravolo	18,098	32.37
Total votes		55,911	100.00
Democratic hold			

=== District 40 ===
California's 40th State Assembly district election, 1990
Party	Candidate	Votes	%
Democratic	Tom Bane (incumbent)	47,215	65.83
Republican	Helen R. Gabriel	20,113	28.04
Libertarian	John Vernon	4,399	6.13
Total votes		71,727	100.00
Democratic hold			

=== District 41 ===
California's 41st State Assembly district election, 1990
Party	Candidate	Votes	%
Republican	Pat Nolan (incumbent)	50,814	56.36
Democratic	Jeannette Mann	34,270	38.01
Libertarian	Curtis S. Helms	3,139	3.48
Peace and Freedom	David Velasquez	1,939	2.15
Total votes		90,162	100.00
Republican hold			

=== District 42 ===
California's 42nd State Assembly district election, 1990
Party	Candidate	Votes	%
Republican	Dick Mountjoy (incumbent)	48,922	57.90
Democratic	Evelyn Fierro	32,594	38.58
Libertarian	Scott Fritschler	2,975	3.52
Total votes		84,491	100.00
Republican hold			

=== District 43 ===
California's 43rd State Assembly district election, 1990
Party	Candidate	Votes	%
Democratic	Terry B. Friedman (incumbent)	61,769	60.46
Republican	Gary Passi	33,377	32.67
Peace and Freedom	John Paul Lindblad	4,324	4.23
Libertarian	Andrew S. Rotter	2,694	2.64
Total votes		102,164	100.00
Democratic hold			

=== District 44 ===
California's 44th State Assembly district election, 1990
Party	Candidate	Votes	%
Democratic	Tom Hayden (incumbent)	58,427	56.18
Republican	Fred Betela	39,869	38.33
Libertarian	Rebecca Donner	3,739	3.59
Peace and Freedom	Timothy Andrew Burdick	1,981	1.90
No party	Andrew Cota (write-in)	3	0.00
Total votes		104,019	100.00
Democratic hold			

=== District 45 ===
California's 45th State Assembly district election, 1990
Party	Candidate	Votes	%
Democratic	Burt Margolin (incumbent)	50,494	65.16
Republican	Elizabeth Michael	22,470	29.00
Peace and Freedom	Owen Staley	4,527	5.84
Total votes		77,491	100.00
Democratic hold			

=== District 46 ===
California's 46th State Assembly district election, 1990
Party	Candidate	Votes	%
Democratic	Mike Roos (incumbent)	20,454	68.01
Republican	Geoffrey Church	7,383	24.55
Peace and Freedom	Dan Robrish	1,371	4.56
Libertarian	Michael B. Everling	869	2.89
Total votes		30,077	100.00
Democratic hold			

=== District 47 ===
California's 47th State Assembly district election, 1990
Party	Candidate	Votes	%
Democratic	Teresa Patterson Hughes (incumbent)	13,880	100.00
Total votes		13,880	100.00
Democratic hold			

=== District 48 ===
California's 48th State Assembly district election, 1990
Party	Candidate	Votes	%
Democratic	Marguerite Archie-Hudson	25,511	79.30
Republican	Gloria Salazar	4,931	15.33
Libertarian	Jose Castaneda	1,727	5.37
Total votes		32,169	100.00
Democratic hold			

=== District 49 ===
California's 49th State Assembly district election, 1990
Party	Candidate	Votes	%
Democratic	Gwen Moore (incumbent)	54,518	72.89
Republican	Eric Givens	16,396	21.92
Peace and Freedom	Alice Mae Miles	2,133	2.85
Libertarian	Carin Rogers	1,748	2.34
Total votes		74,795	100.00
Democratic hold			

=== District 50 ===
California's 50th State Assembly district election, 1990
Party	Candidate	Votes	%
Democratic	Curtis R. Tucker, Jr. (incumbent)	44,235	84.65
Peace and Freedom	Michael L. Long	8,022	15.35
Total votes		52,257	100.00
Democratic hold			

=== District 51 ===
California's 51st State Assembly district election, 1990
Party	Candidate	Votes	%
Republican	Gerald N. Felando (incumbent)	60,580	58.31
Democratic	Marilyn J. Landan	39,016	37.56
Libertarian	William N. Gaillard	4,292	4.13
Total votes		103,888	100.00
Republican hold			

=== District 52 ===
California's 52nd State Assembly district election, 1990
Party	Candidate	Votes	%
Republican	Paul Horcher	45,264	58.90
Democratic	Gary L. Neely	31,583	41.10
Total votes		76,847	100.00
Republican hold			

=== District 53 ===
California's 53rd State Assembly district election, 1990
Party	Candidate	Votes	%
Democratic	Richard Floyd (incumbent)	35,440	60.26
Republican	Kevin B. Davis	23,372	39.74
Total votes		58,812	100.00
Democratic hold			

=== District 54 ===
California's 54th State Assembly district election, 1990
Party	Candidate	Votes	%
Democratic	Willard H. Murray Jr. (incumbent)	29,981	50.04
Republican	Emily Hart-Holifield	24,663	41.15
Libertarian	Art Olivier	3,520	5.87
Peace and Freedom	Norman E. Lynn	1,764	2.94
Total votes		59,928	100.00
Democratic hold			

=== District 55 ===
California's 55th State Assembly district election, 1990
Party	Candidate	Votes	%
Democratic	Richard Polanco (incumbent)	29,912	78.29
Libertarian	Dale S. Olvers	8,293	21.71
Total votes		38,205	100.00
Democratic hold			

=== District 56 ===
California's 56th State Assembly district election, 1990
Party	Candidate	Votes	%
Democratic	Lucille Roybal-Allard (incumbent)	15,761	100.00
Total votes		15,761	100.00
Democratic hold			

=== District 57 ===
California's 57th State Assembly district election, 1990
Party	Candidate	Votes	%
Democratic	Dave Elder (incumbent)	32,024	67.17
Republican	Rodney D. Guarneri	15,653	32.83
Total votes		47,677	100.00
Democratic hold			

=== District 58 ===
California's 58th State Assembly district election, 1990
Party	Candidate	Votes	%
Republican	Tom Mays	57,311	55.13
Democratic	Luanne W. Pryor	41,905	40.30
Libertarian	Scott Stier	4,754	4.57
Total votes		103,970	100.00
Republican hold			

=== District 59 ===
California's 59th State Assembly district election, 1990
Party	Candidate	Votes	%
Democratic	Xavier Becerra	34,650	60.87
Republican	Leland Lieberg	19,938	35.03
Libertarian	Steven Pencall	2,331	4.10
Total votes		56,919	100.00
Democratic hold			

=== District 60 ===
California's 60th State Assembly district election, 1990
Party	Candidate	Votes	%
Democratic	Sally Tanner (incumbent)	25,408	61.17
Republican	Ron Aguirre	16,127	38.83
Total votes		41,535	100.00
Democratic hold			

=== District 61 ===
California's 61st State Assembly district election, 1990
Party	Candidate	Votes	%
Republican	Paul A. Woodruff (incumbent)	61,421	56.46
Democratic	Raynolds Johnson	41,173	37.84
Libertarian	Delvin L. Harbour	6,204	5.70
Total votes		108,798	100.00
Republican hold			

=== District 62 ===
California's 62nd State Assembly district election, 1990
Party	Candidate	Votes	%
Republican	William H. Lancaster (incumbent)	55,469	64.10
Democratic	Selma D. Calnan	31,060	35.90
Total votes		86,529	100.00
Republican hold			

=== District 63 ===
California's 63rd State Assembly district election, 1990
Party	Candidate	Votes	%
Democratic	Bob Epple (incumbent)	36,728	59.61
Republican	Diane P. Boggs	24,888	40.39
Total votes		61,616	100.00
Democratic hold			

=== District 64 ===
California's 64th State Assembly district election, 1990
Party	Candidate	Votes	%
Republican	Ross Johnson (incumbent)	56,646	65.98
Democratic	Kevin Grant Gardner	29,203	34.02
Total votes		85,849	100.00
Republican hold			

=== District 65 ===
California's 65th State Assembly district election, 1990
Party	Candidate	Votes	%
Republican	Jim Brulte	57,331	59.91
Democratic	Bob Erwin	38,358	40.09
Total votes		95,689	100.00
Republican hold			

=== District 66 ===
California's 66th State Assembly district election, 1990
Party	Candidate	Votes	%
Democratic	Gerald R. Eaves (incumbent)	44,944	59.32
Republican	Steven W. Hall	30,824	40.68
Total votes		75,768	100.00
Democratic hold			

=== District 67 ===
California's 67th State Assembly district election, 1990
Party	Candidate	Votes	%
Republican	John Lewis (incumbent)	68,861	67.06
Democratic	Fred Smoller	33,821	32.94
Total votes		102,682	100.00
Republican hold			

=== District 68 ===
California's 68th State Assembly district election, 1990
Party	Candidate	Votes	%
Democratic	Steve Clute (incumbent)	51,203	57.52
Republican	Clay Hage	37,812	42.48
Total votes		89,015	100.00
Democratic hold			

=== District 69 ===
California's 69th State Assembly district election, 1990
Party	Candidate	Votes	%
Republican	Nolan Frizzelle (incumbent)	64,384	63.22
Democratic	Jim Toledano	37,458	36.78
Total votes		101,842	100.00
Republican hold			

=== District 70 ===
California's 70th State Assembly district election, 1990
Party	Candidate	Votes	%
Republican	Gil Ferguson (incumbent)	92,531	64.73
Democratic	Howard Adler	50,418	35.27
Total votes		142,949	100.00
Republican hold			

=== District 71 ===
California's 71st State Assembly district election, 1990
Party	Candidate	Votes	%
Republican	Doris Allen (incumbent)	48,923	60.50
Democratic	Peter Mathews	31,935	39.50
Total votes		80,858	100.00
Republican hold			

=== District 72 ===
California's 72nd State Assembly district election, 1990
Party	Candidate	Votes	%
Democratic	Tom Umberg	25,247	51.89
Republican	Curt Pringle (incumbent)	23,411	48.11
Total votes		48,658	100.00
Democratic gain from Republican			

=== District 73 ===
California's 73rd State Assembly district election, 1990
Party	Candidate	Votes	%
Republican	David G. Kelley (incumbent)	70,161	56.18
Democratic	Ray Strait	54,716	43.82
Total votes		124,877	100.00
Republican hold			

=== District 74 ===
California's 74th State Assembly district election, 1990
Party	Candidate	Votes	%
Republican	Robert C. Frazee (incumbent)	69,856	56.95
Democratic	Jerry Franklin	38,386	31.30
Libertarian	Mark Hunt	9,539	7.78
Peace and Freedom	Mary Rico-Webber	4,865	3.97
Total votes		122,645	100.00
Republican hold			

=== District 75 ===
California's 75th State Assembly district election, 1990
Party	Candidate	Votes	%
Democratic	Dede Alpert	57,735	45.68
Republican	Joyce Mojonnier (incumbent)	51,821	40.99
Libertarian	John Murphy	13,836	10.94
Peace and Freedom	Vi Phuong Huynh	3,025	2.39
Total votes		126,417	100.00
Democratic gain from Republican			

=== District 76 ===
California's 76th State Assembly district election, 1990
Party	Candidate	Votes	%
Republican	Tricia Hunter (incumbent)	83,895	57.07
Democratic	Steve Thorne	39,304	26.73
Libertarian	Bill Holmes	13,751	9.35
Peace and Freedom	Renale M. Kline	6,958	4.73
No party	Edward L. Day (write-in)	3,123	2.12
Total votes		147,031	100.00
Republican hold			

=== District 77 ===
California's 77th State Assembly district election, 1990
Party	Candidate	Votes	%
Republican	Carol Bentley Ellis (incumbent)	54,438	53.70
Democratic	Thomas M. Connolly	35,514	35.04
Libertarian	Joel Denis	6,343	6.26
Peace and Freedom	Arthur Edelman	5,068	5.00
Total votes		101,363	100.00
Republican hold			

=== District 78 ===
California's 78th State Assembly district election, 1990
Party	Candidate	Votes	%
Democratic	Mike Gotch	41,178	44.69
Republican	Jeff Marston (incumbent)	40,561	44.03
Libertarian	Ed McWilliams	5,571	6.05
Peace and Freedom	Bob Bardell	4,228	4.59
No party	Alacia Edwards (write-in)	592	0.64
Total votes		92,131	100.00
Democratic gain from Republican			

=== District 79 ===
California's 79th State Assembly district election, 1990
Party	Candidate	Votes	%
Democratic	Peter R. Chacon (incumbent)	31,538	56.40
Republican	Roger C. Covalt	20,340	36.37
Peace and Freedom	Dennis Terrill	4,043	7.23
Total votes		55,921	100.00
Democratic hold			

=== District 80 ===
California's 80th State Assembly district election, 1990
Party	Candidate	Votes	%
Democratic	Stephen Peace (incumbent)	36,146	57.66
Republican	Kevin B. Kelly	21,884	34.91
American Independent	Lenny Bell	2,795	4.46
Libertarian	Randy Myrseth	1,865	2.97
Total votes		62,690	100.00
Democratic hold			
