= 1992 California State Assembly election =

- November 3, 1992

All 80 seats in the California State Assembly 41 seats needed for a majority
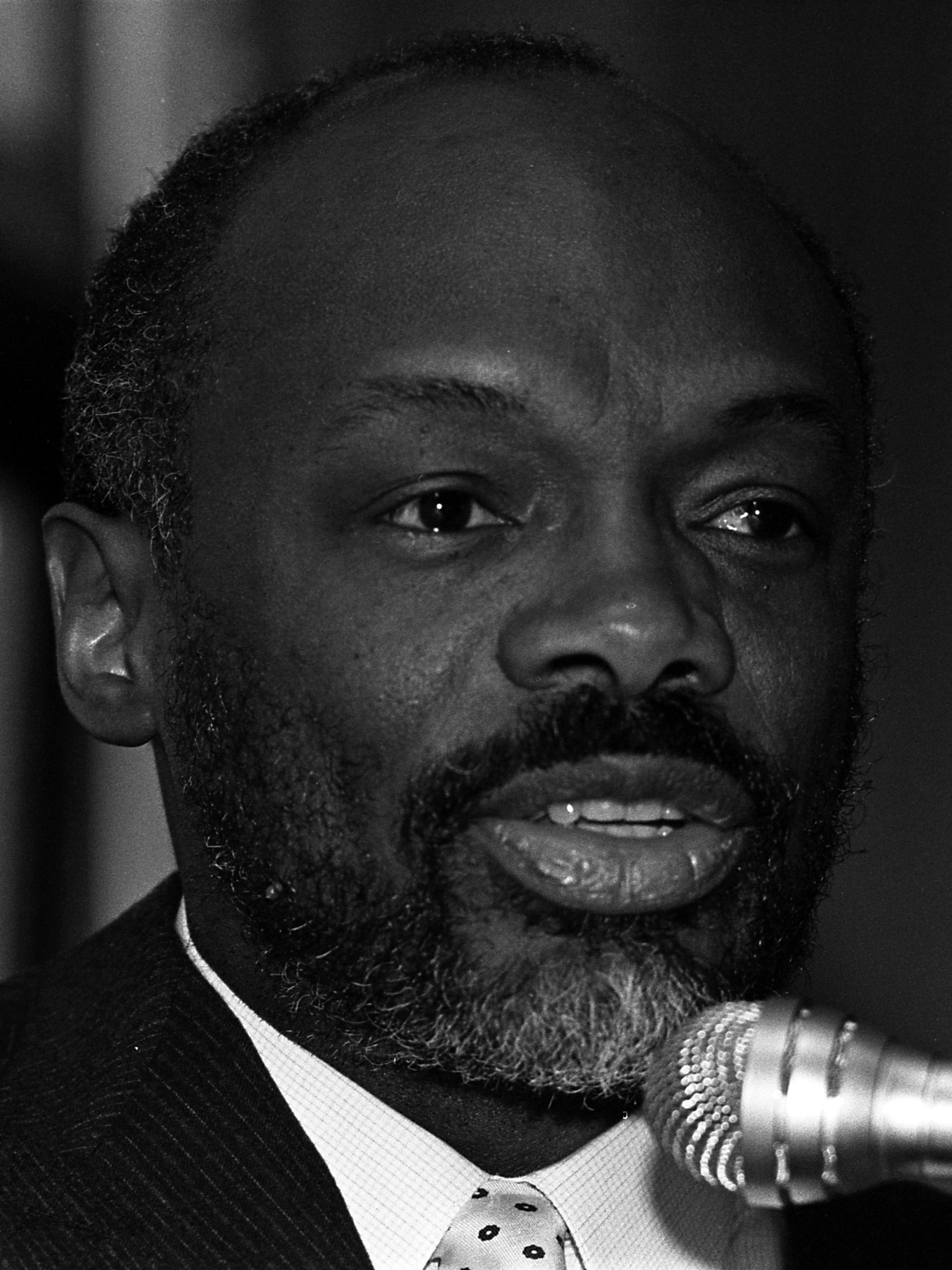

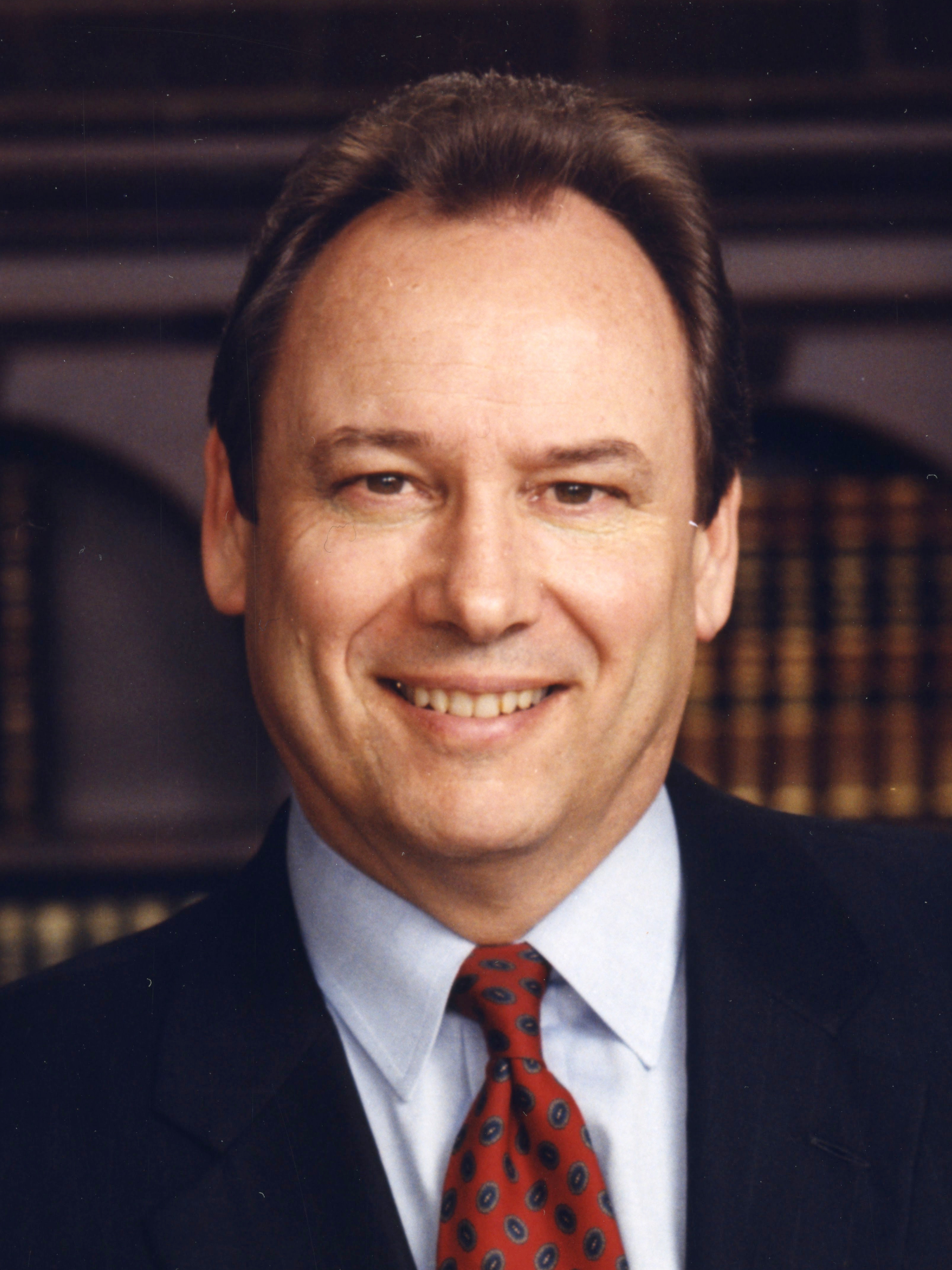
	Majority party	Minority party
Leader	Willie Brown	Bill Jones (retired)
Party	Democratic	Republican
Leader's seat	13th–San Francisco	29th–Fresno
Last election	47	33
Seats won	48	32
Seat change	▲1	▼1
Popular vote	5,299,435	4,393,225
Percentage	51.70%	42.86%
- Results: Democratic gain Democratic hold Republican hold Vote Share: 40–50% 50–60% 60–70% 70–80% 80–90% >90% 40–50% 50–60% 60–70% >90%
Speaker before election
Willie Brown
Democratic
Elected Speaker
Willie Brown
Democratic

The 1992 California State Assembly elections were held on November 3, 1992. California's State Assembly in its entirety comes up for election in even numbered years. Each seat has a two-year term and members are limited to three 2-year terms (six years). All 80 biennially elected seats in the Assembly were up for election this year. Democrats expanded their majority by one seat.

== Overview ==
California State Assembly elections, 1992
Party	Votes	Percentage	Incumbents	Open	Before	After	+/–
Democratic	5,299,435	51.70%	33	14	47	48	+1
Republican	4,393,225	42.86%	20	13	33	32	-1
Libertarian	341,358	3.33%	0	0	0	0	0
Peace and Freedom	144,035	1.41%	0	0	0	0	0
Green	49,424	0.48%	0	0	0	0	0
American Independent	20,053	0.20%	0	0	0	0	0
Write-ins	3,169	0.03%	0	0	0	0	0
Invalid or blank votes	1,107,572	10.80%	—	—	—	—	—
Totals	10,250,699	100.00%	53	27	80	80	—

↓
48	32
Democratic	Republican

== Results ==
Final results from the California Secretary of State:

=== District 1 ===
California's 1st State Assembly district election, 1992
Party	Candidate	Votes	%
Democratic	Dan Hauser (incumbent)	102,093	57.19%
Republican	Anna L. Sparks	61,623	34.52%
Green	Margene McGee	10,151	5.69%
Peace and Freedom	Pamela Elizondo	4,643	2.60%
Invalid or blank votes		7,639	4.10%
Total votes		186,149	100.00%
Democratic hold			

=== District 2 ===
California's 2nd State Assembly district election, 1992
Party	Candidate	Votes	%
Republican	Stan Statham (incumbent)	100,961	64.88%
Democratic	William "Bill" Brashears	54,639	35.12%
Invalid or blank votes		9,830	5.94%
Total votes		165,430	100.00%
Republican hold			

=== District 3 ===
California's 3rd State Assembly district election, 1992
Party	Candidate	Votes	%
Republican	Bernie Richter (incumbent)	85,685	51.70%
Democratic	Lon Hatamiya	62,540	37.74%
Libertarian	Vicki Lynn Vallis	17,502	10.56%
Invalid or blank votes		10,505	5.96%
Total votes		176,232	100.00%
Republican hold			

=== District 4 ===
California's 4th State Assembly district election, 1992
Party	Candidate	Votes	%
Republican	David Knowles (incumbent)	102,578	56.15%
Democratic	Mark A. Norberg	64,400	35.25%
Libertarian	Gary Hines	15,720	8.60%
Invalid or blank votes		16,034	8.07%
Total votes		198,732	100.00%
Republican hold			

=== District 5 ===
California's 5th State Assembly district election, 1992
Party	Candidate	Votes	%
Republican	B. T. Collins (incumbent)	93,833	58.78%
Democratic	Joan Barry	65,787	41.21%
No party	Dale Cressey (write-in)	25	0.02%
Invalid or blank votes		17,448	9.85%
Total votes		177,093	100.00%
Republican hold			

=== District 6 ===
California's 6th State Assembly district election, 1992
Party	Candidate	Votes	%
Democratic	Vivien Bronshvag	100,812	53.28%
Republican	Al Aramburu	74,739	39.50%
Libertarian	Adam McAfee	9,016	4.77%
Peace and Freedom	Coleman C. Persily	4,637	2.45%
Invalid or blank votes		14,391	7.07%
Total votes		203,595	100.00%
Democratic gain from Republican			

=== District 7 ===
California's 7th State Assembly district election, 1992
Party	Candidate	Votes	%
Democratic	Valerie K. Brown	99,269	60.22%
Republican	Janet Nicholas	59,212	35.92%
Peace and Freedom	Irv Sutley	6,358	3.86%
Invalid or blank votes		10,255	5.86%
Total votes		175,003	100.00%
Democratic gain from Republican			

=== District 8 ===
California's 8th State Assembly district election, 1992
Party	Candidate	Votes	%
Democratic	Thomas M. Hannigan (incumbent)	83,839	57.49%
Republican	John W. Ford	53,509	36.69%
Libertarian	Richard Fields	8,307	5.70%
No party	Jeanne Patrick (write-in)	181	0.12%
Invalid or blank votes		10,222	6.55%
Total votes		156,058	100.00%
Democratic gain from Republican			

=== District 9 ===
California's 9th State Assembly district election, 1992
Party	Candidate	Votes	%
Democratic	Phillip Isenberg (incumbent)	83,643	66.01%
Republican	David Reade	33,990	26.82%
Green	Richard Geiselhart	9,081	7.17%
Invalid or blank votes		11,715	8.46%
Total votes		138,429	100.00%
Democratic gain from Republican			

=== District 10 ===
California's 10th State Assembly district election, 1992
Party	Candidate	Votes	%
Republican	Larry Bowler	89,449	53.11%
Democratic	Kay Albiani	70,731	41.99%
American Independent	Stephen M. Delany	4,459	2.65%
Libertarian	Joseph S. Farina	3,798	2.25%
Invalid or blank votes		12,815	7.07%
Total votes		181,252	100.00%
Republican gain from Democratic			

=== District 11 ===
California's 11th State Assembly district election, 1992
Party	Candidate	Votes	%
Democratic	Robert Campbell (incumbent)	114,692	99.12%
No party	Jam L. Denny (write-in)	900	0.78%
No party	Wilbert E. Cossel (write-in)	113	0.10%
Invalid or blank votes		51,411	30.76%
Total votes		167,116	100.00%
Democratic hold			

=== District 12 ===
California's 12th State Assembly district election, 1992
Party	Candidate	Votes	%
Democratic	John L. Burton (incumbent)	84,924	65.10%
Republican	Storm Jenkins	34,104	26.14%
Peace and Freedom	Kitty Reese	8,212	6.29%
Libertarian	Anton Sherwood	3,221	2.47
Invalid or blank votes		28,281	17.82%
Total votes		158,742	100.00%
Democratic hold			

=== District 13 ===
California's 13th State Assembly district election, 1992
Party	Candidate	Votes	%
Democratic	Willie Brown (incumbent)	103,799	69.47%
Republican	John Sidline	28,253	18.91%
Peace and Freedom	Walter Medina	12,042	8.06%
Libertarian	Mark Valverde	5,318	3.56%
No party	George Mehrabian (write-in)	5	0.00%
Invalid or blank votes		28,303	15.93%
Total votes		177,720	100.00%
Democratic hold			

=== District 14 ===
California's 14th State Assembly district election, 1992
Party	Candidate	Votes	%
Democratic	Tom Bates (incumbent)	126,317	82.14%
Peace and Freedom	Marsha Feinland	27,468	17.86%
Invalid or blank votes		25,199	14.08%
Total votes		178,984	100.00%
Democratic hold			

=== District 15 ===
California's 15th State Assembly district election, 1992
Party	Candidate	Votes	%
Republican	Richard Rainey	109,037	58.56%
Democratic	Charles W. Brydon	77,170	41.44%
Invalid or blank votes		22,218	10.66%
Total votes		208,425	100.00%
Republican hold			

=== District 16 ===
California's 16th State Assembly district election, 1992
Party	Candidate	Votes	%
Democratic	Barbara Lee (incumbent)	90,432	74.49%
Republican	David Anderson	24,324	20.04%
Peace and Freedom	Emma Wong Mar	6,643	5.47%
Invalid or blank votes		13,790	10.20%
Total votes		135,189	100.00%
Democratic hold			

=== District 17 ===
California's 17th State Assembly district election, 1992
Party	Candidate	Votes	%
Republican	Dean Andal (incumbent)	59,165	50.63%
Democratic	Michael Machado	57,697	49.37%
Invalid or blank votes		7,736	6.21%
Total votes		124,598	100.00%
Republican hold			

=== District 18 ===
California's 18th State Assembly district election, 1992
Party	Candidate	Votes	%
Democratic	Johan Klehs (incumbent)	87,971	65.02%
Republican	Don J. Grundmann	38,027	28.11%
Libertarian	Terry L. Floyd	9,297	6.87%
Invalid or blank votes		14,361	9.60%
Total votes		149,656	100.00%
Democratic hold			

=== District 19 ===
California's 19th State Assembly district election, 1992
Party	Candidate	Votes	%
Democratic	Jackie Speier (incumbent)	108,428	75.06%
Republican	Ellyne Berger	36,020	24.94%
Invalid or blank votes		10,712	6.90%
Total votes		155,160	100.00%
Democratic hold			

=== District 20 ===
California's 20th State Assembly district election, 1992
Party	Candidate	Votes	%
Democratic	Delaine Eastin (incumbent)	83,889	64.07%
Republican	Lindy G. Batara	47,044	35.93%
Invalid or blank votes		13,129	9.11%
Total votes		144,062	100.00%
Democratic hold			

=== District 21 ===
California's 21st State Assembly district election, 1992
Party	Candidate	Votes	%
Democratic	Byron Sher (incumbent)	105,327	63.18%
Republican	Janice "Jan" LeFetra	55,497	33.29%
Libertarian	Lyn Sapowsky-Smith	5,887	3.53%
Invalid or blank votes		18,028	9.76%
Total votes		184,739	100.00%
Democratic hold			

=== District 22 ===
California's 22nd State Assembly district election, 1992
Party	Candidate	Votes	%
Democratic	John Vasconcellos (incumbent)	81,578	54.36%
Republican	Tim Jeffries	59,120	39.40%
Libertarian	Bob Goodwyn	9,367	6.24%
Invalid or blank votes		13,258	8.12%
Total votes		163,323	100.00%
Democratic gain from Republican			

=== District 23 ===
California's 23rd State Assembly district election, 1992
Party	Candidate	Votes	%
Democratic	Dominic L. Cortese (incumbent)	54,539	65.91%
Republican	Monica A. Valladares	28,212	34.09%
Invalid or blank votes		10,210	10.98%
Total votes		92,961	100.00%
Democratic hold			

=== District 24 ===
California's 24th State Assembly district election, 1992
Party	Candidate	Votes	%
Republican	Chuck Quackenbush (incumbent)	86,165	49.72%
Democratic	Jim Beall	75,776	43.73%
Libertarian	James J. Ludemann	11,344	6.55%
Invalid or blank votes		15,392	8.16%
Total votes		188,677	100.00%
Republican hold			

=== District 25 ===
California's 25th State Assembly district election, 1992
Party	Candidate	Votes	%
Democratic	Margaret E. Snyder	78,251	51.46%
Republican	Barbara Keating-Edh	73,805	48.54%
Invalid or blank votes		6,650	4.19%
Total votes		158,706	100.00%
Democratic hold			

=== District 26 ===
California's 26th State Assembly district election, 1992
Party	Candidate	Votes	%
Democratic	Sal Cannella (incumbent)	54,552	56.82%
Republican	Scott Weimer	33,771	35.18%
Libertarian	Rob Parks	7,682	8.00%
Invalid or blank votes		14,025	12.75%
Total votes		110,030	100.00%
Democratic gain from Republican			

=== District 27 ===
California's 27th State Assembly district election, 1992
Party	Candidate	Votes	%
Democratic	Sam Farr (incumbent)	101,695	60.67%
Republican	Susan Whitman	58,873	35.12%
Peace and Freedom	David Lucier	7,050	4.21%
Invalid or blank votes		10,301	5.79%
Total votes		177,919	100.00%
Democratic hold			

=== District 28 ===
California's 28th State Assembly district election, 1992
Party	Candidate	Votes	%
Democratic	Rusty Areias (incumbent)	64,747	59.05%
Republican	Peter Frusetta	44,905	40.95%
Invalid or blank votes		8,035	6.83%
Total votes		117,687	100.00%
Democratic hold			

=== District 29 ===
California's 29th State Assembly district election, 1992
Party	Candidate	Votes	%
Republican	Bill Jones (incumbent)	122,464	100.00%
Invalid or blank votes		35,739	22.59%
Total votes		158,203	100.00%
Republican hold			

=== District 30 ===
California's 30th State Assembly district election, 1992
Party	Candidate	Votes	%
Democratic	Jim Costa (incumbent)	52,566	65.21%
Republican	Gerald G. Hurt	28,048	34.79%
Invalid or blank votes		6,351	7.30%
Total votes		86,965	100.00%
Democratic hold			

=== District 31 ===
California's 31st State Assembly district election, 1992
Party	Candidate	Votes	%
Democratic	Bruce Bronzan (incumbent)	58,025	100.00%
Invalid or blank votes		24,005	29.26%
Total votes		82,030	100.00%
Democratic hold			

=== District 32 ===
California's 32nd State Assembly district election, 1992
Party	Candidate	Votes	%
Republican	Trice Harvey (incumbent)	87,909	65.54%
Democratic	Irma Carson	42,515	31.70%
Libertarian	Jeffrey Ivan Laing	3,709	2.77%
Invalid or blank votes		8,565	6.00%
Total votes		142,698	100.00%
Republican hold			

=== District 33 ===
California's 33rd State Assembly district election, 1992
Party	Candidate	Votes	%
Republican	Andrea Seastrand (incumbent)	86,090	55.57%
Democratic	John B. Ashbaugh	61,712	39.84%
Libertarian	Steve McClenathan	7,106	4.59%
Invalid or blank votes		7,745	4.76%
Total votes		162,653	100.00%
Republican hold			

=== District 34 ===
California's 34th State Assembly district election, 1992
Party	Candidate	Votes	%
Republican	Kathleen M. Honeycutt	82,792	64.52%
Democratic	Joe Green	45,533	35.48%
Invalid or blank votes		11,051	7.93%
Total votes		139,376	100.00%
Republican hold			

=== District 35 ===
California's 35th State Assembly district election, 1992
Party	Candidate	Votes	%
Democratic	Jack O'Connell (incumbent)	111,313	66.73%
Republican	Alan O. "Lanny" Ebenstein	55,490	33.27%
Invalid or blank votes		13,767	7.62%
Total votes		180,570	100.00%
Democratic hold			

=== District 36 ===
California's 36th State Assembly district election, 1992
Party	Candidate	Votes	%
Republican	William J. Knight	79,718	58.18%
Democratic	Arnie Rodio	45,893	33.50%
Libertarian	Ronald Tisbert	11,403	8.32%
Invalid or blank votes		12,797	8.54%
Total votes		149,811	100.00%
Republican hold			

=== District 37 ===
California's 37th State Assembly district election, 1992
Party	Candidate	Votes	%
Republican	Nao Takasugi	66,364	50.83%
Democratic	Roz McGrath	56,692	43.42%
Libertarian	David Harner	7,504	5.75%
Invalid or blank votes		11,047	7.80%
Total votes		141,607	100.00%
Republican hold			

=== District 38 ===
California's 38th State Assembly district election, 1992
Party	Candidate	Votes	%
Republican	Paula Boland (incumbent)	78,770	53.67%
Democratic	Howard Cohen	59,742	40.71%
Libertarian	Devin Cutler	8,250	5.62%
Invalid or blank votes		16,747	10.24%
Total votes		163,509	100.00%
Republican hold			

=== District 39 ===
California's 39th State Assembly district election, 1992
Party	Candidate	Votes	%
Democratic	Richard Katz (incumbent)	45,387	69.40%
Republican	Nicholas Fitzgerald	16,739	25.60%
Libertarian	David H. George	3,270	5.00%
Invalid or blank votes		5,994	8.40%
Total votes		71,390	100.00%
Democratic hold			

=== District 40 ===
California's 40th State Assembly district election, 1992
Party	Candidate	Votes	%
Democratic	Barbara Friedman (incumbent)	66,597	57.83%
Republican	Horace H. Heidt	35,111	30.49%
Peace and Freedom	Jean K. Glasser	5,808	5.04%
Green	Glenn Bailey	4,093	3.55%
Libertarian	John Vernon	3,547	3.08%
Invalid or blank votes		11,083	8.78%
Total votes		126,239	100.00%
Democratic hold			

=== District 41 ===
California's 41st State Assembly district election, 1992
Party	Candidate	Votes	%
Democratic	Terry B. Friedman (incumbent)	101,516	55.36%
Republican	Christine Reed	72,580	39.58%
Libertarian	Roy A. Sykes, Jr.	9,265	5.05%
Invalid or blank votes		16,997	8.48%
Total votes		200,358	100.00%
Democratic hold			

=== District 42 ===
California's 42nd State Assembly district election, 1992
Party	Candidate	Votes	%
Democratic	Burt Margolin (incumbent)	112,864	67.34%
Republican	Robert "Bob" Davis	44,584	26.60%
Peace and Freedom	Timothy Burdick	5,686	3.39%
Libertarian	Andrew S. Rotter	4,478	2.67%
Invalid or blank votes		24,351	12.69%
Total votes		191,963	100.00%
Democratic hold			

=== District 43 ===
California's 43rd State Assembly district election, 1992
Party	Candidate	Votes	%
Republican	Pat Nolan (incumbent)	64,489	56.20%
Democratic	Elliott Graham	42,962	37.44%
Libertarian	Anthony G. Bajada	7,293	6.36%
Invalid or blank votes		12,405	9.76%
Total votes		127,149	100.00%
Republican hold			

=== District 44 ===
California's 44th State Assembly district election, 1992
Party	Candidate	Votes	%
Republican	Bill Hoge	77,044	51.83%
Democratic	Jonathan S. Fuhrman	65,332	43.95%
Libertarian	Ken Saurenman	6,270	4.22%
Invalid or blank votes		15,890	6.35%
Total votes		164,536	100.00%
Republican hold			

=== District 45 ===
California's 45th State Assembly district election, 1992
Party	Candidate	Votes	%
Democratic	Richard Polanco (incumbent)	37,196	64.61%
Republican	Kitty Hedrick	15,028	26.10%
Peace and Freedom	Jaime Luis Gomez	5,349	9.29%
Invalid or blank votes		6,537	10.20%
Total votes		64,110	100.00%
Democratic hold			

=== District 46 ===
California's 46th State Assembly district election, 1992
Party	Candidate	Votes	%
Democratic	Louis Caldera	21,429	71.80%
Republican	David M. Osborne	6,368	21.34%
Peace and Freedom	Casey Peters	1,325	4.44%
Libertarian	Michael B. Everling	723	2.42%
Invalid or blank votes		4,335	12.68%
Total votes		34,180	100.00%
Democratic hold			

=== District 47 ===
California's 47th State Assembly district election, 1992
Party	Candidate	Votes	%
Democratic	Gwen Moore (incumbent)	105,838	80.80%
Republican	Jonathan Leonard	18,344	14.00%
Libertarian	Chuck Hammill	4,969	3.79%
Peace and Freedom	Yassin A. Saededdin	1,834	1.40%
Invalid or blank votes		15,939	10.85%
Total votes		146,924	100.00%
Democratic hold			

=== District 48 ===
California's 48th State Assembly district election, 1992
Party	Candidate	Votes	%
Democratic	Marguerite Archie-Hudson (inc.)	55,719	93.05%
Republican	Jonathan Leonard	4,159	6.95%
Invalid or blank votes		11,514	16.13%
Total votes		71,392	100.00%
Democratic hold			

=== District 49 ===
California's 49th State Assembly district election, 1992
Party	Candidate	Votes	%
Democratic	Diane Martinez	43,820	55.47%
Republican	Sophie C. Wong	32,258	40.84%
Libertarian	Kim Goldsworthy	2,917	3.69%
Invalid or blank votes		6,407	7.50%
Total votes		85,402	100.00%
Democratic hold			

=== District 50 ===
California's 50th State Assembly district election, 1992
Party	Candidate	Votes	%
Democratic	Martha M. Escutia	26,887	75.04%
Republican	Gladys O. Miller	8,943	24.96%
Invalid or blank votes		4,576	11.33%
Total votes		40,406	100.00%
Democratic hold			

=== District 51 ===
California's 51st State Assembly district election, 1992
Party	Candidate	Votes	%
Democratic	Curtis R. Tucker, Jr.	74,904	81.94%
Libertarian	Clark W. Hanley	11,236	12.29%
Peace and Freedom	Xenia Geraldina Williams	5,270	5.77%
Invalid or blank votes		13,817	13.13%
Total votes		105,227	100.00%
Democratic gain from Republican			

=== District 52 ===
California's 52nd State Assembly district election, 1992
Party	Candidate	Votes	%
Democratic	Willard H. Murray, Jr. (incumbent)	57,588	100.00%
Invalid or blank votes		20,914	26.64%
Total votes		78,502	100.00%
Democratic hold			

=== District 53 ===
California's 53rd State Assembly district election, 1992
Party	Candidate	Votes	%
Democratic	Debra Bowen	95,703	54.12%
Republican	W. Brad Parton	72,870	41.21%
Libertarian	William N. Gaillard	8,248	4.66%
Invalid or blank votes		15,743	8.18%
Total votes		192,564	100.00%
Democratic hold			

=== District 54 ===
California's 54th State Assembly district election, 1992
Party	Candidate	Votes	%
Democratic	Betty Karnette	78,400	51.94%
Republican	Gerald N. Felando (incumbent)	66,282	43.91%
American Independent	Joseph G. "Joe" Fields	6,264	4.15%
Invalid or blank votes		13,844	8.40%
Total votes		164,790	100.00%
Democratic gain from Republican			

=== District 55 ===
California's 55th State Assembly district election, 1992
Party	Candidate	Votes	%
Democratic	Juanita Millender-McDonald	63,337	82.79%
Libertarian	Shannon Anderson	13,168	17.21%
Invalid or blank votes		12,182	13.74%
Total votes		88,687	100.00%
Democratic hold			

=== District 56 ===
California's 56th State Assembly district election, 1992
Party	Candidate	Votes	%
Democratic	Bob Epple (incumbent)	61,330	47.81%
Republican	Phil Hawkins	60,788	47.39%
Libertarian	Richard Gard	6,151	4.80%
Invalid or blank votes		9,421	6.84%
Total votes		137,690	100.00%
Democratic hold			

=== District 57 ===
California's 57th State Assembly district election, 1992
Party	Candidate	Votes	%
Democratic	Hilda Solis	44,078	60.86%
Republican	Gary Woods	24,824	34.27%
Libertarian	Bruce Dovner	3,529	4.87%
Invalid or blank votes		6,604	8.36%
Total votes		79,035	100.00%
Democratic hold			

=== District 58 ===
California's 58th State Assembly district election, 1992
Party	Candidate	Votes	%
Democratic	Grace Napolitano	62,426	64.20%
Republican	Ken Gow	27,352	28.13%
Libertarian	John P. McCready	7,459	7.67%
Invalid or blank votes		10,239	9.53%
Total votes		107,476	100.00%
Democratic gain from Republican			

=== District 59 ===
California's 59th State Assembly district election, 1992
Party	Candidate	Votes	%
Republican	Dick Mountjoy (incumbent)	79,846	55.47%
Democratic	Louise Gelber	64,091	44.53%
Invalid or blank votes		12,288	7.87%
Total votes		156,225	100.00%
Republican gain from Democratic			

=== District 60 ===
California's 60th State Assembly district election, 1992
Party	Candidate	Votes	%
Republican	Paul V. Horcher (incumbent)	67,397	55.69%
Democratic	Stan Caress	44,284	36.60%
American Independent	Robert Lewis	9,330	7.71%
Invalid or blank votes		13,224	9.85%
Total votes		134,235	100.00%
Republican gain from Democratic			

=== District 61 ===
California's 61st State Assembly district election, 1992
Party	Candidate	Votes	%
Republican	Fred Aguiar	52,686	58.40%
Democratic	Larry S. Simcoe	32,740	36.29%
Green	Cynthia Allaire	4,787	5.31%
Invalid or blank votes		8,433	8.55%
Total votes		98,646	100.00%
Republican hold			

=== District 62 ===
California's 62nd State Assembly district election, 1992
Party	Candidate	Votes	%
Democratic	Joe Baca	51,372	58.63%
Republican	Steve Hall	30,750	35.10%
Libertarian	Ethel M. Haas	5,496	6.27%
Invalid or blank votes		8,363	10.71%
Total votes		95,981	100.00%
Democratic hold			

=== District 63 ===
California's 63rd State Assembly district election, 1992
Party	Candidate	Votes	%
Republican	Jim Brulte (incumbent)	76,888	56.06%
Democratic	A. L. "Larry" Westwood	42,860	31.25%
Green	Joseph “Joe" M. Desist	17,413	12.70%
Invalid or blank votes		16,448	10.71%
Total votes		153,609	100.00%
Republican hold			

=== District 64 ===
California's 64th State Assembly district election, 1992
Party	Candidate	Votes	%
Republican	Ted Weggeland	56,298	47.85%
Democratic	Jane Carney	54,784	46.56%
Libertarian	Jane A. Henson	6,572	5.59%
Invalid or blank votes		7,284	5.83%
Total votes		124,938	100.00%
Republican hold			

=== District 65 ===
California's 65th State Assembly district election, 1992
Party	Candidate	Votes	%
Republican	Paul A. Woodruff (incumbent)	68,768	52.45%
Democratic	Alice J. Robb	50,768	38.72%
Libertarian	Michael S. Geller	11,575	8.83%
Invalid or blank votes		13,055	9.06%
Total votes		144,166	100.00%
Republican hold			

=== District 66 ===
California's 66th State Assembly district election, 1992
Party	Candidate	Votes	%
Republican	Ray Haynes	83,919	58.09%
Democratic	Patsy Hockersmith	45,324	31.37%
Peace and Freedom	Anne Patrice Wood	10,303	7.13%
Libertarian	Bill E. Reed	4,916	3.40%
Invalid or blank votes		14,313	9.01%
Total votes		158,775	100.00%
Republican gain from Democratic			

=== District 67 ===
California's 67th State Assembly district election, 1992
Party	Candidate	Votes	%
Republican	Doris Allen	95,444	59.21%
Democratic	Ken Leblanc	53,187	33.00%
Libertarian	Brian Schar	12,556	7.79%
Invalid or blank votes		21,148	11.60%
Total votes		182,335	100.00%
Republican hold			

=== District 68 ===
California's 68th State Assembly district election, 1992
Party	Candidate	Votes	%
Republican	Curt Pringle	61,615	57.14%
Democratic	Linda Kay Rigney	46,222	42.86%
Invalid or blank votes		12,829	10.63%
Total votes		120,666	100.00%
Republican gain from Democratic			

=== District 69 ===
California's 69th State Assembly district election, 1992
Party	Candidate	Votes	%
Democratic	Tom Umberg (incumbent)	32,700	60.03%
Republican	Jo Ellen Allen	18,560	34.07%
Libertarian	David R. Keller	3,217	5.91%
Invalid or blank votes		4,550	7.71%
Total votes		59,027	100.00%
Democratic gain from Republican			

=== District 70 ===
California's 70th State Assembly district election, 1992
Party	Candidate	Votes	%
Republican	Gil Ferguson (incumbent)	93,865	56.68%
Democratic	Jim Toledano	59,976	36.22%
Libertarian	Scott Bieser	11,763	7.10%
Invalid or blank votes		19,368	10.47%
Total votes		184,972	100.00%
Republican hold			

=== District 71 ===
California's 71st State Assembly district election, 1992
Party	Candidate	Votes	%
Republican	Mickey Conroy (incumbent)	97,714	61.85%
Democratic	Ben Foster	60,279	38.15%
Invalid or blank votes		18,645	10.56%
Total votes		176,638	100.00%
Republican hold			

=== District 72 ===
California's 72nd State Assembly district election, 1992
Party	Candidate	Votes	%
Republican	Ross Johnson (incumbent)	86,622	61.16%
Democratic	Paul Garza, Jr.	45,934	32.43%
Libertarian	Geoffrey Braun	9,076	6.41%
Invalid or blank votes		17,560	11.03%
Total votes		159,192	100.00%
Republican gain from Democratic			

=== District 73 ===
California's 73rd State Assembly district election, 1992
Party	Candidate	Votes	%
Republican	Bill Morrow	76,862	54.36%
Democratic	Lee Walker	52,952	37.45%
Libertarian	Paul H. King	6,699	4.74%
Peace and Freedom	Paul A. Steele	4,889	3.46%
Invalid or blank votes		16,961	10.71%
Total votes		158,363	100.00%
Republican hold			

=== District 74 ===
California's 74th State Assembly district election, 1992
Party	Candidate	Votes	%
Republican	Robert C. Frazee (incumbent)	83,591	55.87%
Democratic	Ken Lanzer	47,876	32.00%
Libertarian	Mark Hunt	9,808	6.56%
Peace and Freedom	Shirley Marcoux	8,350	5.58%
Invalid or blank votes		17,547	10.50%
Total votes		167,172	100.00%
Republican hold			

=== District 75 ===
California's 75th State Assembly district election, 1992
Party	Candidate	Votes	%
Republican	Jan Goldsmith	100,858	64.47%
Democratic	Dante Cosentino	42,375	27.09%
Libertarian	J. C. Anderson	6,282	4.02%
Green	Daniel Ford Tarr	3,899	2.49%
Peace and Freedom	Alfredo R. Felix	3,037	1.94%
Invalid or blank votes		20,372	11.52%
Total votes		176,823	100.00%
Republican gain from Republican			

=== District 76 ===
California's 76th State Assembly district election, 1992
Party	Candidate	Votes	%
Democratic	Mike Gotch (incumbent)	85,409	57.25%
Republican	Dick Dajeke	55,230	37.02%
Libertarian	Pat Wright	5,366	3.60%
Peace and Freedom	Forest H. Worten	3,189	2.14%
Invalid or blank votes		13,507	8.30%
Total votes		162,701	100.00%
Democratic gain from Republican			

=== District 77 ===
California's 77th State Assembly district election, 1992
Party	Candidate	Votes	%
Democratic	Tom Connolly	64,143	47.80%
Republican	Steve Baldwin	59,884	44.62%
Libertarian	Jeff Bishop	8,122	6.05%
Peace and Freedom	Reed Kroopkin	2,047	1.53%
Invalid or blank votes		10,963	7.57%
Total votes		145,159	100.00%
Democratic gain from Republican			

=== District 78 ===
California's 78th State Assembly district election, 1992
Party	Candidate	Votes	%
Democratic	Deirdre "Dede" Alpert (inc.)	81,819	53.39%
Republican	Jeff Marston	63,293	41.30%
Peace and Freedom	Sally Sherry O'Brien	7,792	5.08%
No party	Dan van Tieghem (write-in)	353	0.23%
Invalid or blank votes		22,145	12.63%
Total votes		175,402	100.00%
Democratic hold			

=== District 79 ===
California's 79th State Assembly district election, 1992
Party	Candidate	Votes	%
Democratic	Steve Peace (incumbent)	46,739	65.23%
Republican	Raul Silva-Martinez	19,855	27.71%
Libertarian	James R. Train	2,956	4.13%
Peace and Freedom	Edwardo A. Prud-Home	2,103	2.93%
Invalid or blank votes		6,591	8.42%
Total votes		78,244	100.00%
Democratic hold			

=== District 80 ===
California's 80th State Assembly district election, 1992
Party	Candidate	Votes	%
Democratic	Julie Bornstein	56,760	49.65%
Republican	Tricia Rae Hunter	55,971	48.96%
No party	Philip B. Dreisbach (write-in)	1,592	1.39%
Invalid or blank votes		9,269	7.50%
Total votes		123,592	100.00%
Democratic hold			

== See also ==
- California State Senate
- California State Senate elections, 1992
- California State Assembly Districts
- California state elections, 1992
- Districts in California
- Political party strength in California
- Political party strength in U.S. states
