= California's 7th district =

California's 7th district may refer to:

- California's 7th congressional district
- California's 7th State Assembly district
- California's 7th State Senate district
