= Michael Allen (California politician) =

American politician (born 1947)

Member of the California State Assembly from the 7th district
- In office December 6, 2010 – November 30, 2012
- Preceded by: Noreen Evans
- Succeeded by: Roger Dickinson

Personal details
- Born: January 2, 1947 (age 79) Los Angeles, California, U.S.
- Party: Democratic
- Profession: Lawyer, registered nurse

Michael Allen (born January 2, 1947) is an American politician who served in the California State Assembly. He is a Democrat. Prior to being elected to the state assembly, he was a member of the Santa Rosa Planning Commission and District Director for then-State Senator Pat Wiggins.

== Early career ==
Prior to a career in politics, Michael Allen was a psychiatric nurse for the Sonoma County Mental Health Department's Psychiatric Crisis Clinic and Inpatient Unit. He attended Empire College School of Law, graduating in 1979. After graduating, Allen was employed by Earthjustice where he worked on the Warm Springs Dam initiative.

Allen was employed by the Sonoma County Organization of Public Employees (SCOPE) as a negotiator. After SCOPE affiliated with the Service Employees International Union as Local 707, the membership promoted Allen to Executive Director of Local 707. He served nine terms as the President of the North Bay Labor Council. In 2007, State Senator Pat Wiggins asked Allen to accept the position of District Director for her five regional offices that serve over 880,000 constituents.

Allen was appointed to the Santa Rosa Planning Commission in 2009 and served as Chair of the Sonoma–Marin Area Rail Transit (SMART) Citizens Oversight Committee.

Allen practices labor law, representing unions.

== Election to State Assembly ==
On November 2, 2010, Allen was elected to succeed Noreen Evans as the representative of the 7th Assembly district, winning 63.8% of the vote in the general election. He served as Assistant Majority Floor Leader in the California State Assembly. He was the first Latino to represent the 7th district.

The statewide redistricting in 2011 significantly changed the 7th District, and the redrawn district excluded Allen's residence. Allen moved to San Rafael in Marin County to run for election in the open 10th Assembly district in 2012, but unexpectedly lost reelection to San Rafael City Councilman Marc Levine.

== Personal life ==
Allen was raised in Los Angeles, California by his mother. When his father, Lawrence Allen, died when he was 6 years old, his mother, Hermina Padilla Allen, raised him on her own and worked as a seamstress to support them.

Allen resides in San Rafael, California; he has five grown children. He is of half-Mexican and half Swedish-Scottish ancestry.
