= California's 2nd senatorial district =

American legislative district

California's 2nd State Senate district
Current senator
Mike McGuire; D–Healdsburg
- Population (2010) • Voting age • Citizen voting age: 928,077; 729,486; 635,914
- Demographics: 69.94% White; 2.10% Black; 19.53% Latino; 4.29% Asian; 3.02% Native American; 0.32% Hawaiian/Pacific Islander; 0.35% other; 0.45% remainder of multiracial
- Registered voters: 551,154
- Registration: 53.40% Democratic; 19.12% Republican; 21.53% No party preference

California's 2nd senatorial district is one of 40 California State Senate districts. It is currently represented by Democrat Mike McGuire of Healdsburg.

== District profile ==
The district stretches along the North Coast from the Oregon border in the north to the northern San Francisco Bay Area in the south. It includes Del Norte, Humboldt, Trinity, Mendocino, Lake, Sonoma, and Marin Counties. The northern part of district is primarily rural, while the southern parts are more suburban.

== Election results from statewide races ==
Year	Office	Results
2020	President	Biden 72.7 – 24.9%
2018	Governor	Newsom 71.1 - 28.9%
2018	Senator	Feinstein 55.9 - 44.1%
2016	President	Clinton 68.0 – 24.3%
2016	Senator	Harris 73.0 – 27.0%
2014	Governor	Brown 72.7 – 27.3%
2012	President	Obama 68.7 – 27.4%
2012	Senator	Feinstein 72.6 – 27.4%
(...)
2002	Governor	Davis 49.3 - 33.3%
2000	President	Gore 55.0 - 35.9%
2000	Senator	Feinstein 57.2 - 32.1%
1998	Governor	Davis 60.8 - 32.0%
1998	Senator	Boxer 57.8 - 37.5%
1996	President	Clinton 51.7 - 32.0%
1994	Governor	Wilson 48.8 - 45.8%
1994	Senator	Feinstein 52.4 - 38.9%
1992	President	Clinton 50.1 - 28.4%
1992	Senator	Boxer 53.4 - 36.4%
1992	Senator	Feinstein 60.6 - 31.5%

== List of senators representing the district ==
Due to redistricting, the 2nd district has been moved around different parts of the state. The current iteration resulted from the 2021 redistricting by the California Citizens Redistricting Commission.

=== 1851: two seats ===
Years	Seat A			Seat B			Counties represented
Years	Member	Party	Electoral history	Member	Party	Electoral history	Counties represented
January 6, 1851 – January 11, 1851	Stephen C. Foster (Los Angeles)	Democratic	Elected in 1850. Redistricted to the single-member district after Hope resigned.	Alexander W. Hope (Los Angeles)	Republican	Redistricted from the Los Angeles and San; Diego districts and re-elected in 1850. Resigned.	Los Angeles

=== 1851–present: one seat ===
Senators	Party	Years served	Electoral history	Counties represented
Stephen C. Foster (Los Angeles)	Democratic	January 11, 1851 – January 2, 1854	Redistricted from single-member district. Re-elected in 1851. Re-elected in 1852. [data missing]	Los Angeles
Pablo de la Guerra (Santa Barbara)	Democratic	January 2, 1854 – January 6, 1862	Redistricted from the 3rd district and re-elected in 1854. Re-elected in 1855. Re-elected in 1856. Re-elected in 1859. Re-elected in 1860. [data missing]	San Luis Obispo, Santa Barbara
Pablo de la Guerra (Santa Barbara)	Douglas; Democratic	January 2, 1854 – January 6, 1862	Redistricted from the 3rd district and re-elected in 1854. Re-elected in 1855. Re-elected in 1856. Re-elected in 1859. Re-elected in 1860. [data missing]	San Luis Obispo, Santa Barbara
James R. Vineyard (Los Angeles)	Democratic	January 6, 1862 – August 30, 1863	Elected in 1861. Died.	Los Angeles
Vacant		August 30, 1863 – December 7, 1863		Los Angeles
Henry Hamilton (Los Angeles)	Democratic	December 7, 1863 – December 4, 1865	Elected in 1863. [data missing]	Los Angeles
Phineas Banning (Wilmington)	Democratic	December 4, 1865 – December 6, 1869	Elected in 1863. [data missing]	Los Angeles
B. D. Wilson (Los Angeles)	Independent	December 6, 1869 – January 8, 1873	Elected in 1868. [data missing]	Los Angeles
C. W. Bush (Los Angeles)	Independent	January 8, 1873 – December 3, 1877	Elected in 1873. [data missing]	Los Angeles
George H. Smith (Los Angeles)	Democratic	December 3, 1877 – January 5, 1880	Elected in 1877. [data missing]	Los Angeles
John P. West (Los Angeles)	Workingmen's	January 5, 1880 – January 8, 1883	Elected in 1879. [data missing]	Los Angeles
R. F. del Valle (Los Angeles)	Democratic	January 8, 1883 – January 3, 1887	Elected in 1882. Re-elected in 1884. [data missing]	
John M. Briceland (Shasta)	Democratic	January 3, 1887 – January 5, 1891	Elected in 1886. [data missing]	Shasta, Siskiyou, Trinity
R. H. Campbell (Etna)	Republican	January 5, 1891 – January 7, 1895	Elected in 1890. [data missing]	Shasta, Siskiyou, Trinity
R. H. Campbell (Etna)	Republican	January 5, 1891 – January 7, 1895	Elected in 1890. [data missing]	Lassen, Modoc, Shasta, Siskiyou, Trinity
James M. Gleaves (Shasta)	Republican	January 7, 1895 – January 2, 1899	Elected in 1894. Retired after being appointed as Surveyor General of California.	Lassen, Modoc, Shasta, Siskiyou, Trinity
James T. Laird (Alturas)	Republican	January 2, 1899 – January 5, 1903	Elected in 1898. [data missing]	Lassen, Modoc, Shasta, Siskiyou, Trinity
Clifford Coggins (Igerna)	Republican	January 5, 1903 – January 7, 1907	Elected in 1902. [data missing]	Lassen, Modoc, Shasta, Siskiyou
Abner Weed (Mount Shasta)	Republican	January 7, 1907 – January 2, 1911	Elected in 1906. [data missing]	Lassen, Modoc, Shasta, Siskiyou
T. W. H. Shanahan (Redding)	Democratic	January 2, 1911 – January 4, 1915	Elected in 1910. [data missing]	Lassen, Modoc, Shasta, Siskiyou
William B. Shearer (Yreka)	Democratic	January 4, 1915 – January 8, 1923	Elected in 1914. Re-elected in 1918. [data missing]	Lassen, Modoc, Shasta, Siskiyou
Franklin J. Powers (Eagleville)	Republican	January 8, 1923 – January 3, 1927	Elected in 1922. [data missing]	Lassen, Modoc, Shasta, Siskiyou
James M. Allen (Yreka)	Democratic	January 3, 1927 – January 7, 1935	Elected in 1926. Re-elected in 1930. [data missing]	Lassen, Modoc, Shasta, Siskiyou
James M. Allen (Yreka)	Democratic	January 3, 1927 – January 7, 1935	Elected in 1926. Re-elected in 1930. [data missing]	Del Norte, Siskiyou
Henry M. McGuinness (Dunsmuir)	Democratic	January 7, 1935 – March 16, 1936	Elected in 1934. Died.	Del Norte, Siskiyou
Vacant		March 16, 1936 – May 25, 1936		Del Norte, Siskiyou
James M. Allen (Yreka)	Democratic	May 25, 1936 – January 2, 1939	Elected to finish McGuinness's term. [data missing]	Del Norte, Siskiyou
Randolph Collier (Yreka)	Republican	January 2, 1939 – January 2, 1967	Elected in 1938. Re-elected in 1942. Re-elected 1946. Re-elected in 1950. Re-elected in 1954. Re-elected in 1958. Re-elected in 1962. Redistricted to the 1st district.	Del Norte, Siskiyou
Randolph Collier (Yreka)	Democratic	January 2, 1939 – January 2, 1967	Elected in 1938. Re-elected in 1942. Re-elected 1946. Re-elected in 1950. Re-elected in 1954. Re-elected in 1958. Re-elected in 1962. Redistricted to the 1st district.	Del Norte, Siskiyou
Fred W. Marler Jr. (Redding)	Republican	January 2, 1967 – November 30, 1974	Elected in 1966. Re-elected in 1970. Retired to become a Justice of the Sacramento County Superior Court.	Shasta, Butte, Colusa Glenn, Sutter, Tehama, Yolo, Yuba, Solano
Peter H. Behr (San Rafael)	Republican	December 2, 1974 – November 30, 1978	Redistricted from the 4th district and re-elected in 1974. Retired.	Marin, Solano, Napa
Peter H. Behr (San Rafael)	Republican	December 2, 1974 – November 30, 1978	Redistricted from the 4th district and re-elected in 1974. Retired.	Del Norte, Humboldt, Lake, Marin, Mendocino, Sonoma
Barry Keene (Santa Rosa)	Democratic	December 4, 1978 – December 15, 1992	Elected in 1978. Re-elected in 1982. Re-elected in 1986. Re-elected in 1990. Resigned.	Del Norte, Humboldt, Lake, Marin, Mendocino, Sonoma
Vacant		December 15, 1992 – May 20, 1993		Del Norte, Humboldt, Mendocino, Solano, Sonoma
Mike Thompson (St. Helena)	Democratic	May 20, 1993 – November 30, 1998	Elected to finish Keene's term. Re-elected in 1994. Retired to run for U.S. House of Representatives.	Del Norte, Humboldt, Mendocino, Solano, Sonoma
Mike Thompson (St. Helena)	Democratic	May 20, 1993 – November 30, 1998	Elected to finish Keene's term. Re-elected in 1994. Retired to run for U.S. House of Representatives.	Del Norte, Humboldt, Mendocino, Solano, Sonoma, Lake, Napa
Wesley Chesbro (Arcata)	Democratic	December 7, 1998 – November 30, 2006	Elected in 1998. Re-elected in 2002. Term-limited and retired.	Del Norte, Humboldt, Mendocino, Solano, Sonoma, Lake, Napa
Wesley Chesbro (Arcata)	Democratic	December 7, 1998 – November 30, 2006	Elected in 1998. Re-elected in 2002. Term-limited and retired.	Humboldt, Mendocino, Solano, Sonoma, Lake, Napa
Pat Wiggins (Santa Rosa)	Democratic	December 4, 2006 – November 30, 2010	Elected in 2006. Retired.	Humboldt, Mendocino, Solano, Sonoma, Lake, Napa
Noreen Evans (Santa Rosa)	Democratic	December 6, 2010 – November 30, 2014	Elected in 2010. Retired.	Humboldt, Mendocino, Solano, Sonoma, Lake, Napa
Mike McGuire (Healdsburg)	Democratic	December 1, 2014 – present	Elected in 2014. Re-elected in 2018. Re-elected in 2022. Term-limited and retiring at end of term.	Del Norte, Humboldt, Lake, Marin, Mendocino, Sonoma Trinity

== Election results (1990-present) ==
=== 2022 ===
2022 California State Senate 2nd district election
Primary election
Party	Candidate	Votes	%
Democratic	Mike McGuire (incumbent)	197,999	75.1
Republican	Gene Yoon	65,762	24.9
Total votes		263,761	100.0
General election
Democratic	Mike McGuire (incumbent)	283,689	73.3
Republican	Gene Yoon	103,333	26.7
Total votes		387,022	100.0
Democratic hold			

=== 2018 ===
2018 California State Senate 2nd district election
Primary election
Party	Candidate	Votes	%
Democratic	Mike McGuire (incumbent)	163,723	76.2
Democratic	Veronica "Roni" Jacobi	51,186	23.8
Total votes		214,909	100.0
General election
Democratic	Mike McGuire (incumbent)	233,688	67.2
Democratic	Veronica "Roni" Jacobi	114,184	32.8
Total votes		347,872	100.0
Democratic hold			

=== 2014 ===
2014 California State Senate 2nd district election
Primary election
Party	Candidate	Votes	%
Democratic	Mike McGuire	104,670	57.9
Republican	Lawrence R. Wiesner	48,401	26.8
Democratic	Derek Knell	19,733	10.9
No party preference	Harry V. Lehmann	8,060	4.5
Total votes		180,864	100.0
General election
Democratic	Mike McGuire	188,142	70.0
Republican	Lawrence R. Wiesner	80,778	30.0
Total votes		268,920	100.0
Democratic hold			

=== 2010 ===
2010 California State Senate 2nd district election
Party	Candidate	Votes	%
Democratic	Noreen Evans	190,474	63.4
Republican	Lawrence R. Wiesner	110,141	36.6
Independent	Ed Musgrave (write-in)	10	0.0
Total votes		300,625	100.0
Democratic hold			

=== 2006 ===
2006 California State Senate 2nd district election
Party	Candidate	Votes	%
Democratic	Pat Wiggins	187,035	66.1
Republican	Lawrence R. Wiesner	97,611	33.9
Total votes		284,646	100.0
Democratic hold			

=== 2002 ===
2002 California State Senate 2nd district election
Party	Candidate	Votes	%
Democratic	Wesley Chesbro (incumbent)	156,755	63.3
Republican	Peggy Redfearn	80,079	32.6
Libertarian	Laura Jean Likover	10,210	4.1
Total votes		247,044	100.0
Democratic hold			

=== 1998 ===
1998 California State Senate 2nd district election
Party	Candidate	Votes	%
Democratic	Wesley Chesbro	137,728	51.2
Republican	John Jordan	112,754	41.9
Peace and Freedom	Brian Garay	18,612	6.9
Total votes		269,094	100.0
Democratic hold			

=== 1994 ===
1994 California State Senate 2nd district election
Party	Candidate	Votes	%
Democratic	Mike Thompson (incumbent)	162,610	60.4
Republican	Frank McMichael	95,275	35.4
Peace and Freedom	Pamela Elizondo	11,289	4.2
Total votes		269,174	100.0
Democratic hold			

=== 1993 (special) ===
1993 California State Senate 2nd district special election Vacancy resulting from the resignation of Barry Keene
Party	Candidate	Votes	%
Democratic	Mike Thompson	48,098	47.6
Republican	Margie Handley	47,420	46.9
Peace and Freedom	Phil Baldwin	5,582	5.5
Total votes		101,100	100.0
Democratic hold			

=== 1990 ===
1990 California State Senate 2nd district election
Party	Candidate	Votes	%
Democratic	Barry Keene (incumbent)	126,552	54.0
Republican	Margie Handley	107,864	46.0
Total votes		234,416	100.0
Democratic hold			

== See also ==
- California State Senate
- California State Senate districts
- Districts in California
