= David Knowles (California politician) =

American politician from California

Member of the California State Assembly from the 4th district
- In office December 7, 1992 – November 30, 1996
- Preceded by: Thomas M. Hannigan
- Succeeded by: Rico Oller

Member of the California State Assembly from the 7th district
- In office December 3, 1990 - November 30, 1992
- Preceded by: Norman S. Waters
- Succeeded by: Valerie K. Brown

Personal details
- Born: September 5, 1952 (age 73) Cleveland, Ohio
- Party: Republican
- Spouse: Ana Mary
- Children: 6

David Knowles (born September 5, 1952) served in the California State Assembly representing the 7th district from December 3, 1990 to November 30, 1992 and the 4th district from December 7, 1992 to November 30, 1996.

Knowles also served as a Chief Executive for the California Earthquake Authority from January 4, 1999 to January 16, 2002.

== Electoral history ==
1994 California's 4th State Assembly district election
Party	Candidate	Votes	%
Republican	David Knowles (incumbent)	101,020	64.97
Democratic	Charles W. "Charlie" Fish	47,700	30.68
Libertarian	Clyde B. Smith	6,774	4.36
Invalid or blank votes		11,755	7.03
Total votes		167,249	100.00
Republican hold			

1992 California's 4th State Assembly district election
Party	Candidate	Votes	%
Republican	David Knowles (incumbent)	102,578	56.15
Democratic	Mark A. Norberg	64,400	35.25
Libertarian	Gary Hines	15,720	8.60
Invalid or blank votes		16,034	8.07
Total votes		198,732	100.00
Republican hold			

1990 California's 7th State Assembly district election
Party	Candidate	Votes	%
Republican	David Knowles	82,862	51.35
Democratic	Norman S. Waters (incumbent)	78,490	48.64
No party	Christopher Carrillo (write-in)	13	0.01
Total votes		161,365	100.00
Republican gain from Democratic			
