= Noreen Evans =

American lawyer and politician

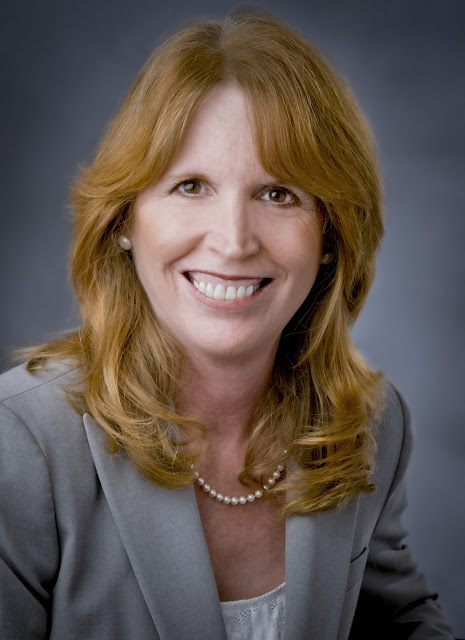

Member of the California State Senate from the 2nd district
- In office December 6, 2010 – November 30, 2014
- Preceded by: Pat Wiggins
- Succeeded by: Mike McGuire

Member of the California State Assembly from the 7th district
- In office December 6, 2004 – December 6, 2010
- Preceded by: Pat Wiggins
- Succeeded by: Michael Allen

Member of the Santa Rosa City Council
- In office 1996–2004

Personal details
- Born: Noreen Marie Evans; April 22, 1955 (age 71) Livermore, California
- Party: Democratic
- Education: California State University, Sacramento; University of the Pacific
- Occupation: Attorney

Noreen Marie Evans (born April 22, 1955) is an American lawyer and politician who was a member of the California State Senate. As a Democrat, she represented the 2nd district, encompassing Humboldt, Mendocino, Lake and Napa counties, as well as parts of Sonoma and Solano counties.

== Early life and education ==
Evans attended California State University, Sacramento, graduating in 1978 with an undergraduate degree in government. She then attended the University of the Pacific's McGeorge School of Law, graduating with a J.D. in 1981.

== Career ==
=== Private law ===
In 1982, Evans was admitted to the California bar. After graduation, she studied international business at the University of Salzburg and worked in Ireland at a Dublin firm of solicitors. In the United States, she practiced law as a civil litigator, arguing cases before both trial and appellate courts. She was a litigation partner in the Santa Rosa law firm of O’Brien, Watters, & Davis, and then an attorney with the Santa Rosa law firm Lanahan & Reilley, LLP. She was admitted to practice in various federal district courts, the United States Court of Appeals for the Ninth Circuit, and the United States Supreme Court.

=== Political ===
Evans began her political career in 1996, when she was elected to the Santa Rosa City Council. In March 2000 she lost to incumbent Tim Smith in a primary contest for the 3rd District seat on the Sonoma County Board of Supervisors, 52% to 48%. In November 2000 she was reelected to the city council.

When Evans completed her second city council term in 2004, the 7th Assembly District seat in the California State Assembly was open, because the incumbent, Pat Wiggins, was barred by term limits from seeking reelection. Evans ran for the seat and was elected in November 2004, and was re-elected in 2006 without facing any opposition. She was re-elected in 2008; in 2010 she was barred by term limits from seeking reelection.

In August 2009, Wiggins, who had been elected to the State Senate in 2006, announced that she would not run for re-election in 2010. Evans ran for the seat being vacated, and was nominated in June 2010 as the Democratic candidate. She won the general election in November 2010.

Evans is the chair of the Senate Committee on Judiciary Committee, which also includes a seat on the Judicial Council, the policy making body for all California courts. She also chairs the Senate Select Committee on Wine and the Senate Select Committee on Food: Local, Organic, and Sustainable Systems.

On August 12, 2013, Evans announced that she would not be a candidate for reelection and that she would return to private law practice.

In January 2016, Evans entered the race for supervisor in Sonoma County's 5th District. However, she was defeated by organic farmer Lynda Hopkins 23,259 votes to 19,601.

California Senate
Preceded by Pat Wiggins	Member of the California State Senate; 2nd District; 2010 – 2014	Succeeded by Mike McGuire
California Assembly
Preceded by Pat Wiggins	Member of the California State Assembly; 7th District; 2004–2010	Succeeded by Michael Allen
