= Valerie K. Brown =

American politician

Valerie Brown

Member of the Sonoma County Board of Supervisors from the 1st district
- In office 2002–2012
- Preceded by: Mike Cale

Member of the California State Assembly from the 7th district
- In office December 7, 1992 - November 30, 1998
- Preceded by: David Knowles
- Succeeded by: Pat Wiggins

Personal details
- Born: October 30, 1954 (age 71) Kansas City, Missouri, U.S.
- Party: Democratic
- Education: University of Missouri (BA); Lindenwood University (MS)

Valerie K. Brown (born October 30, 1954) is an American politician who served as a member of the Sonoma County Board of Supervisors from 2002 to 2012. Brown was previously a member of the California State Assembly from 1992 to 1998.

== Early life and education ==
Brown was born and raised in Kansas City, Missouri. She earned a Bachelor of Arts degree in secondary education and English from the University of Missouri and a Master of Science in counseling psychology from Lindenwood University.

== Career ==
After earning her master's degree, Brown moved to Southern California. She later moved to Sonoma, California in 1984. In 1991, she was elected to the Sonoma City Council and later served as mayor.

Brown was first elected to the State Assembly in 1992, after Bev Hansen declined to run for re-election as the 1990 re-districting had made the district significantly more Democratic. Brown defeated Republican former Sonoma County Supervisor Janet Nicholas.

Brown was viewed as a likely candidate for the California State Senate in 1998, as she was unable to seek re-election to the Assembly due to term limits, and Senator Mike Thompson was retiring from the Senate to seek election to the United States House of Representatives. Brown did not run for the Senate, leaving the nomination to California Integrated Waste Management Board member and former Humboldt County Supervisor Wesley Chesbro.

After Mike Cale, who had served on the Sonoma County Board of Supervisors for 10 years, resigned in 2001, Brown was appointed to his place by Governor Gray Davis. Brown was the first woman on the board since the resignation of Janet Nicholas 10 years earlier. She was re-elected in 2004 and narrowly re-elected in 2008. From 2009 to 2010, Valerie served as president of the National Association of Counties.

In 2015, Brown sold her home in Kenwood, California and returned to her hometown of Columbia, Missouri, where she works as an independent government affairs consultant.
