= Wesley Chesbro =

American politician

Wesley P. Chesbro
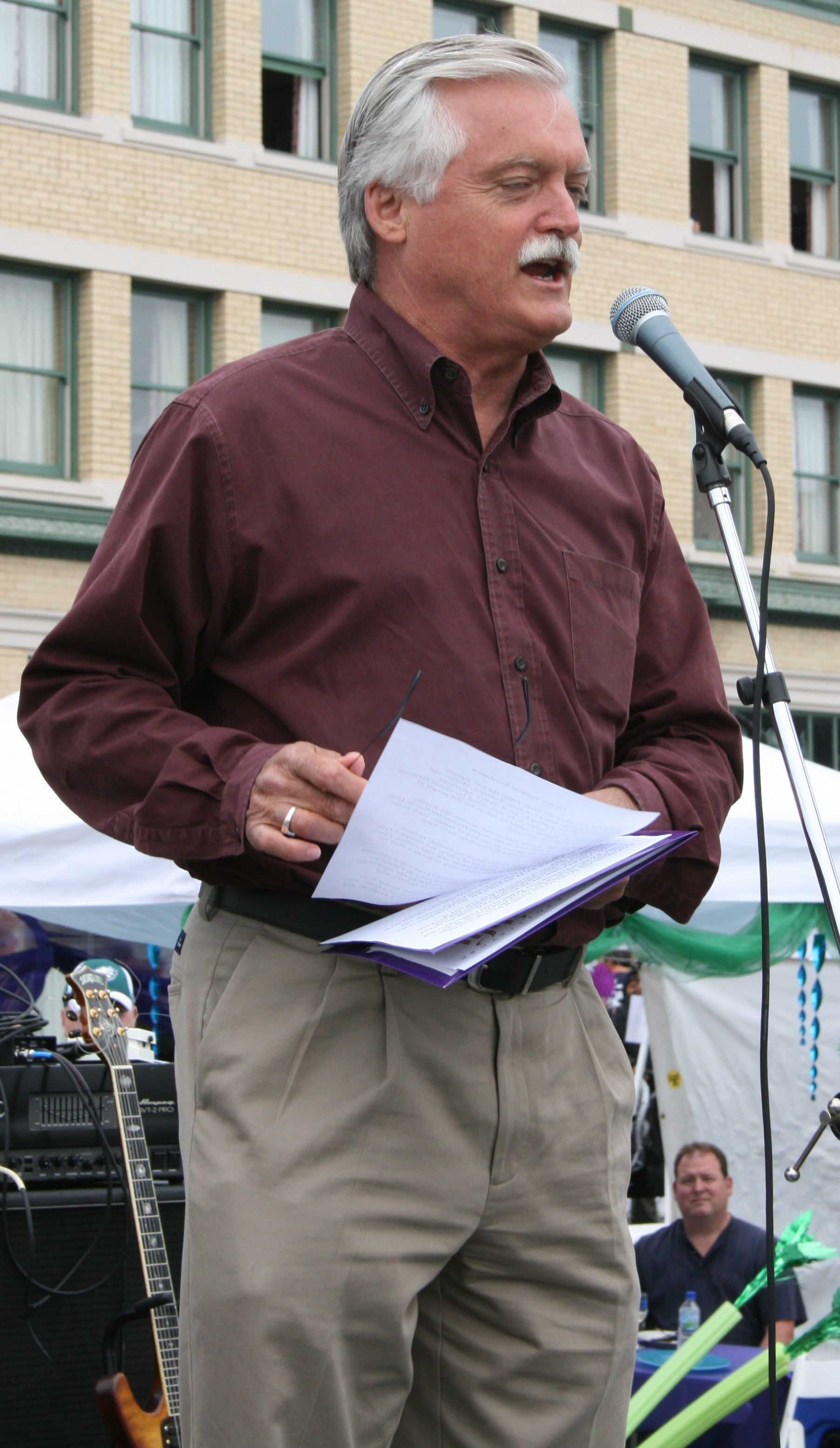
- Retired

Member of the California State Assembly
- In office December 1, 2008 – November 30, 2014
- Preceded by: Patty Berg
- Succeeded by: Jim Wood
- Constituency: 1st district (2008–2012); 2nd district (2012–2014)

Member of the California State Senate from the 2nd district
- In office December 7, 1998 – December 4, 2006
- Preceded by: Mike Thompson
- Succeeded by: Pat Wiggins

Personal details
- Born: August 20, 1951 (age 75) Los Angeles, California, U.S.
- Party: Democratic
- Spouse: Cindy Chesbro
- Children: Collin, Alan
- Education: University of San Francisco
- Occupation: Politician

Wesley P. Chesbro (born August 20, 1951) is an American Democratic politician from California. He was an assemblymember for the 2nd district, encompassing the North Coast. Previously, Chesbro served as the Assembly member from California's 1st district from 2008 until 2012. He has also served as a member of the California Integrated Waste Management Board.

== Early career ==
Chesbro was an early leader in the recycling movement having founded the Arcata Recycling Center in 1971. The Arcata Recycling Center was one of California's oldest and most successful recycling operations. He has also served as a Humboldt County Supervisor and an Arcata city councilmember.

== Post-Senate career ==
Chesbro was term-limited in 2006 and was replaced by Pat Wiggins. On January 5, 2007, Chesbro was appointed by the California State Senate Rules Committee to serve again on the California Integrated Waste Management Board. On January 12, 2007, State Superintendent of Public Instruction Jack O'Connell announced the appointment of Chesbro to the California Mental Health Services Oversight and Accountability Commission.

== 2008 assembly election ==
On February 8, 2008, Chesbro announced he would run in the November 2008 election to replace term-limited Patty Berg in California's 1st assembly district. He was successful, winning with 70.5% of the vote over Republican Jim Pell.
