= Pat Wiggins =

American politician

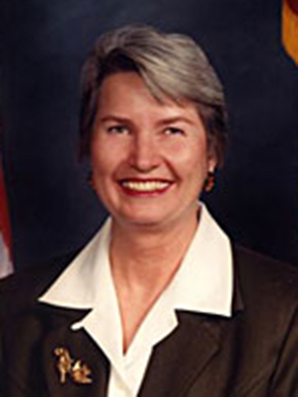

Member of the California State Senate from the 2nd district
- In office December 4, 2006 – December 6, 2010
- Preceded by: Wesley Chesbro
- Succeeded by: Noreen Evans

Member of the California State Assembly from the 7th district
- In office December 7, 1998 – November 30, 2004
- Preceded by: Valerie K. Brown
- Succeeded by: Noreen Evans

Personal details
- Born: April 19, 1940 Pasadena, California, U.S.
- Died: August 15, 2013 (aged 73) Santa Rosa, California, U.S.
- Party: Democratic
- Spouse: Guy Conner
- Education: UCLA
- Profession: Politician

Patricia A. Wiggins (April 19, 1940 – August 15, 2013) was an American politician and member of the Democratic Party. Wiggins served in the California State Assembly, representing the 7th district from 1998 until 2004, and in the California State Senate from 2006 to 2010, representing the 2nd district. Wiggins previously served as a member of the Santa Rosa city council.

== Early life and education ==
Wiggins' father, Ralph Wiggins, was the stuntman responsible for the wing-walking maneuvers in Robert Redford's 1975 movie, The Great Waldo Pepper, and her mother, Grace, was one of the first women ever to parachute. At age 38, Wiggins graduated from the University of California, Los Angeles with a bachelor's degree in English.

== Career ==
=== State Assembly ===
Wiggins represented the 7th District (Napa, Solano and Sonoma counties) until she was forced out of office by term limits in December 2004. She served as Chair of the Local Government and Banking Committees. In 2000, as an Assemblywoman, Wiggins founded the Legislature's Smart Growth Caucus (www.assembly.ca.gov/sgc), which grew to include 47 of the legislature's 120 members over the next few years. She is the author of AB 857 (statutes of 2002), pertaining to land use planning. AB 857 established California's spending priorities for future development to address sprawl, and to promote compact development. She is also the author of legislation to facilitate farmworker housing, to promote mixed use development, and to increase funding for agriculture.

Other legislative initiatives included:

- AB 2878 (2001), which would have required cities to swap a portion of their sales tax revenue with counties for a portion of the counties' property tax revenue.
- AB 1268 (initial version) (2003) which would have established statewide urban growth boundaries and inclusionary zoning.
- AB 2924 (2004) which would have provided grants to install solar panels on publicly subsidized housing developments.

In October 2001, Wiggins brought together representatives of Napa County and all of its cities and urged them to plan collectively for the area's long-term housing needs. Local officials agreed, and went a step further by agreeing to work together on a comprehensive, county-wide land-use plan. Wiggins provided support throughout the process, which to date has resulted in significant agreements among the governmental entities involved. A comprehensive plan was expected in time for the next housing element cycle in 2007.

=== State Senate ===
Wiggins was elected to the California State Senate in November 2006, for a four-year term. On August 23, 2009, she announced that she would not run for re-election in 2010. In March 2010, the Senate Rules Committee agreed to remove her from most of her committee assignments, at her request, for medical reasons.

In the Senate, Wiggins chaired the Senate Standing Committee on Public Employment & Retirement, the Senate Select Committee on California's Wine Industry, and the Joint Legislative Committee on Fisheries & Aquaculture.

== Personal life ==
Wiggins was married to Guy Conner, a computer software engineer, and had two stepsons, Jim and Steve Silverman, and three grandchildren. She had been a resident of Santa Rosa, California since 1985.

=== Death ===
Wiggins died of a long illness on August 15, 2013.
