= California's 7th State Assembly district =

American legislative district

Current assemblymember
| Josh Hoover; R–Folsom |
- Population (2010) • Voting age • Citizen voting age: 464,310; 346,100; 286,401
- Demographics: 43.31% White; 11.08% Black; 26.93% Latino; 14.66% Asian; 1.26% Native American; 1.06% Hawaiian/Pacific Islander; 0.33% other; 1.38% remainder of multiracial
- Registered voters: 284,021
- Registration: 37.89% Democratic; 32.74% Republican; 23.81% No party preference

California's 7th State Assembly district is one of 80 California State Assembly districts. It is currently represented by Republican Josh Hoover of Folsom.

== District profile ==
Before remapping necessitated by the 2020 census, the district encompassed the northern two-thirds of the city of Sacramento and its northern and western suburbs. The California State Capitol was located in the district. After remapping, the district has moved to include northeast Sacramento County, including the cities of Rancho Cordova, Citrus Heights, Carmichael, Fair Oaks, Orangevale, and Folsom, with Sacramento itself moved to the 6th Assembly District.

== Election results from statewide races ==
| Year | Office | Results |
|---|---|---|
| 2024 | President | Harris 50.6 – 46.1% |
| 2024 | Senator (Full) | Schiff 50.1 – 49.9% |
| 2024 | Senator (Partial) | Schiff 50.3 – 49.7% |
| 2022 | Governor | Dahle 51.7 – 48.3% |
| 2022 | Senator (Full) | Padilla 51.0 – 49.0% |
| 2022 | Senator (Partial) | Padilla 50.8 – 49.2% |
| 2021 | Recall | No 68.8 – 31.2% |
| 2020 | President | Biden 69.1 – 28.4% |
| 2018 | Governor | Newsom 68.3 – 31.7% |
| 2018 | Senator | Feinstein 55.4 – 44.6% |
| 2016 | President | Clinton 67.5 – 25.6% |
| 2016 | Senator | Harris 63.6 – 36.4% |
| 2014 | Governor | Brown 71.9 – 28.1% |
| 2012 | President | Obama 67.5 – 29.6% |
| 2012 | Senator | Feinstein 69.7 – 30.3% |

== List of assembly members representing the district ==
Due to redistricting, the 7th district has been moved around different parts of the state. The current iteration resulted from the 2021 redistricting by the California Citizens Redistricting Commission.

| Assembly members | Party | Years served | Counties represented | Notes |
|---|---|---|---|---|
| John F. Ellison | Republican | January 5, 1885 – January 3, 1887 | Tehama | |
| William P. Mathews | Democratic | January 3, 1887 – January 5, 1891 | Tehama | |
| James Thompson Matlock Sr. | Republican | January 5, 1891 – January 2, 1893 | Tehama | |
| Edward B. Price | Democratic | January 2, 1893 – January 31, 1893 | Butte | Died in office. |
| Vacant | | January 31, 1893 – January 7, 1895 | Butte | |
| Frederick R. Stansell | Republican | January 7, 1895 – January 2, 1899 | Butte | |
| Richard DeLancie | Republican | January 2, 1899 – January 1, 1901 | Butte | |
| Barnabas Collins | Republican | January 1, 1901 – January 5, 1901 | Butte | Died shortly after being sworn in office. Died from pneumonia. |
| Vacant | | January 5, 1901 – January 5, 1903 | Butte | |
| Frederick R. Stansell | Republican | January 5, 1903 – January 2, 1905 | Butte | |
| William F. Gates | Republican | January 2, 1905 – January 7, 1907 | Butte | |
| William James Costar | Republican | January 7, 1907 – January 2, 1911 | Butte | |
| John H. Guill Jr. | Democratic | January 2, 1911 – January 4, 1915 | Butte | |
| B. B. Meek | Democratic | January 4, 1915 – January 8, 1917 | Butte | |
| C. H. Brown | Republican | January 8, 1917 – January 6, 1919 | Butte | |
| Elizabeth Hughes | Republican | January 6, 1919 – January 8, 1923 | Butte | |
| Bert B. Snyder | Republican | January 8, 1923 – January 5, 1925 | Butte | |
| Charles H. Deuel | Democratic | January 5, 1925 – January 5, 1931 | Butte | |
| Hubert B. Scudder | Republican | January 5, 1931 – January 2, 1933 | Sonoma | |
| Hubert B. Scudder | Republican | January 2, 1933 – January 6, 1941 | Sonoma, Marin | |
| Richard H. McCollister | Republican | January 6, 1941 – January 2, 1961 | Sonoma, Marin | |
| Bill Bagley | Republican | January 2, 1961 – November 30, 1974 | Sonoma, Marin | |
| John Garamendi | Democratic | December 2, 1974 – November 30, 1976 | Alpine, Amador, Calaveras, El Dorado, Mono, Sacramento, San Joaquin, Tuolumne | |
| Norman S. Waters | Democratic | December 6, 1976 – November 30, 1982 | Alpine, Amador, Calaveras, El Dorado, Mono, Sacramento, San Joaquin, Tuolumne | |
| Norman S. Waters | Democratic | December 6, 1982 – November 30, 1990 | Alpine, Amador, Calaveras, El Dorado, Mono, Placer, Sacramento, Tuolumne | |
| David Knowles | Republican | December 3, 1990 – November 30, 1992 | Alpine, Amador, Calaveras, El Dorado, Mono, Placer, Sacramento, Tuolumne | |
| Valerie K. Brown | Democratic | December 7, 1992 – November 30, 1998 | Napa, Solano, Sonoma | |
| Pat Wiggins | Democratic | December 7, 1998 – November 30, 2004 | Napa, Solano, Sonoma | |
| Noreen Evans | Democratic | December 6, 2004 – December 6, 2010 | Napa, Solano, Sonoma | |
| Michael Allen | Democratic | December 6, 2010 – November 30, 2012 | Napa, Solano, Sonoma | |
| Roger Dickinson | Democratic | December 3, 2012 – November 30, 2014 | Sacramento, Yolo | |
| Kevin McCarty | Democratic | December 1, 2014 – November 30, 2022 | Sacramento, Yolo | |
| Josh Hoover | Republican | December 5, 2022 – present | Sacramento | |

== Election results (1990–present) ==
=== 2024 ===
2024 California State Assembly 7th district election
Primary election
| Party | Candidate | Votes | % |
|---|---|---|---|
| Republican | Josh Hoover (incumbent) | 59,398 | 52.7 |
| Democratic | Porsche Middleton | 33,045 | 29.3 |
| Democratic | YK Chalamcherla | 20,265 | 18.0 |
| Total votes | | 112,708 | 100.0 |
General election
| Republican | Josh Hoover (incumbent) | 116,254 | 53.6 |
| Democratic | Porsche Middleton | 100,487 | 46.4 |
| Total votes | | 216,741 | 100.0 |
| Republican hold | | | |

=== 2022 ===
2022 California State Assembly 7th district election
Primary election
| Party | Candidate | Votes | % |
|---|---|---|---|
| Democratic | Ken Cooley | 56,949 | 50.9 |
| Republican | Josh Hoover | 38,001 | 34.0 |
| Republican | Raymond Riehle | 9,429 | 8.4 |
| Republican | Jeffrey Perrine | 6,214 | 5.6 |
| Republican | Quintin Levesque | 1,249 | 1.1 |
| Total votes | | 111,842 | 100.0 |
General election
| Republican | Josh Hoover | 83,768 | 50.4 |
| Democratic | Ken Cooley | 82,385 | 49.6 |
| Total votes | | 166,153 | 100.0 |
| Republican gain from Democratic | | | |

=== 2020 ===
2020 California State Assembly 7th district election
Primary election
| Party | Candidate | Votes | % |
|---|---|---|---|
| Democratic | Kevin McCarty (incumbent) | 88,869 | 99.8 |
| Libertarian | James O. Just (write-in) | 199 | 0.2 |
| Total votes | | 89,068 | 100.0 |
General election
| Democratic | Kevin McCarty (incumbent) | 149,083 | 73.9 |
| Libertarian | James O. Just | 52,543 | 26.1 |
| Total votes | | 201,626 | 100.0 |
| Democratic hold | | | |

=== 2018 ===
2018 California State Assembly 7th district election
Primary election
| Party | Candidate | Votes | % |
|---|---|---|---|
| Democratic | Kevin McCarty (incumbent) | 63,705 | 99.6 |
| Republican | Scott Schmidt (write-in) | 237 | 0.4 |
| Total votes | | 63,942 | 100.0 |
General election
| Democratic | Kevin McCarty (incumbent) | 107,849 | 71.3 |
| Republican | Scott Schmidt | 43,361 | 28.7 |
| Total votes | | 151,210 | 100.0 |
| Democratic hold | | | |

=== 2016 ===
2016 California State Assembly 7th district election
Primary election
| Party | Candidate | Votes | % |
|---|---|---|---|
| Democratic | Kevin McCarty (incumbent) | 69,901 | 99.5 |
| Republican | Ryan K. Brown (write-in) | 254 | 0.4 |
| Libertarian | Janine Kloss (write-in) | 51 | 0.1 |
| Republican | Ralph Merletti (write-in) | 43 | 0.1 |
| Total votes | | 70,249 | 100.0 |
General election
| Democratic | Kevin McCarty (incumbent) | 111,112 | 69.8 |
| Republican | Ryan K. Brown | 48,097 | 30.2 |
| Total votes | | 159,209 | 100.0 |
| Democratic hold | | | |

=== 2014 ===
2014 California State Assembly 7th district election
Primary election
| Party | Candidate | Votes | % |
|---|---|---|---|
| Democratic | Kevin McCarty | 18,935 | 34.9 |
| Democratic | Steve Cohn | 15,877 | 29.3 |
| Republican | Ralph Merletti | 8,115 | 15.0 |
| Democratic | Mark Johannessen | 6,413 | 11.8 |
| Republican | Oliver Ponce | 4,869 | 9.0 |
| Total votes | | 54,209 | 100.0 |
General election
| Democratic | Kevin McCarty | 46,983 | 58.7 |
| Democratic | Steve Cohn | 33,051 | 41.3 |
| Total votes | | 80,034 | 100.0 |
| Democratic hold | | | |

=== 2012 ===
2012 California State Assembly 7th district election
Primary election
| Party | Candidate | Votes | % |
|---|---|---|---|
| Democratic | Roger Dickinson (incumbent) | 41,100 | 68.0 |
| Republican | Jonathan Zachariou | 19,304 | 32.0 |
| Total votes | | 60,404 | 100.0 |
General election
| Democratic | Roger Dickinson (incumbent) | 96,422 | 69.8 |
| Republican | Jonathan Zachariou | 41,735 | 30.2 |
| Total votes | | 138,157 | 100.0 |
| Democratic hold | | | |

=== 2010 ===
2010 California State Assembly 7th district election
| Party | Candidate | Votes | % |
|---|---|---|---|
| Democratic | Michael Allen | 86,316 | 63.7 |
| Republican | Doris Gentry | 43,293 | 31.9 |
| Libertarian | Kathryn N. Moore | 5,977 | 4.4 |
| Total votes | | 135,586 | 100.0 |
| Democratic hold | | | |

=== 2008 ===
2008 California State Assembly 7th district election
| Party | Candidate | Votes | % |
|---|---|---|---|
| Democratic | Noreen Evans (incumbent) | 128,279 | 71.9 |
| Republican | Doris Gentry | 50,020 | 28.1 |
| Total votes | | 178,299 | 100.0 |
| Democratic hold | | | |

=== 2006 ===
2006 California State Assembly 7th district election
| Party | Candidate | Votes | % |
|---|---|---|---|
| Democratic | Noreen Evans (incumbent) | 99,262 | 98.5 |
| Republican | Raylene Wiesner (write-in) | 1,464 | 1.5 |
| Total votes | | 100,726 | 100.0 |
| Democratic hold | | | |

=== 2004 ===
2004 California State Assembly 7th district election
| Party | Candidate | Votes | % |
|---|---|---|---|
| Democratic | Noreen M. Evans | 101,130 | 60.1 |
| Republican | Pat Krueger | 62,035 | 36.9 |
| Republican | F. Aaron Smith | 5,051 | 3.0 |
| Total votes | | 168,216 | 100.0 |
| Democratic hold | | | |

=== 2002 ===
2002 California State Assembly 7th district election
| Party | Candidate | Votes | % |
|---|---|---|---|
| Democratic | Pat Wiggins (incumbent) | 77,401 | 76.1 |
| Libertarian | David J. Kozlowski | 24,386 | 23.9 |
| Total votes | | 101,787 | 100.0 |
| Democratic hold | | | |

=== 2000 ===
2000 California State Assembly 7th district election
| Party | Candidate | Votes | % |
|---|---|---|---|
| Democratic | Pat Wiggins (incumbent) | 102,425 | 66.5 |
| Republican | Pedro J. Rivera | 45,563 | 29.6 |
| Libertarian | William Schoeffler | 6,147 | 4.0 |
| Total votes | | 154,135 | 100.0 |
| Democratic hold | | | |

=== 1998 ===
1998 California State Assembly 7th district election
| Party | Candidate | Votes | % |
|---|---|---|---|
| Democratic | Pat Wiggins | 80,178 | 62.13 |
| Republican | Bob Sanchez | 43,398 | 33.6 |
| Libertarian | Mike Rodrigues | 3,694 | 2.9 |
| Peace and Freedom | Irv Sutley | 1,773 | 1.4 |
| Total votes | | 129,044 | 100.0 |
| Democratic hold | | | |

=== 1996 ===
1996 California State Assembly 7th district election
| Party | Candidate | Votes | % |
|---|---|---|---|
| Democratic | Valerie K. Brown (incumbent) | 89,864 | 61.7 |
| Republican | Ken Larsen | 48,114 | 33.0 |
| Peace and Freedom | Al Liner | 5,690 | 3.9 |
| Natural Law | Alan Roy Barreca | 1,977 | 1.4 |
| Total votes | | 145,645 | 100.0 |
| Democratic hold | | | |

=== 1994 ===
1994 California State Assembly 7th district election
| Party | Candidate | Votes | % |
|---|---|---|---|
| Democratic | Valerie K. Brown (incumbent) | 73,389 | 58.5 |
| Republican | Roger D. Williams | 48,928 | 39.0 |
| Peace and Freedom | Irv Sutley | 3,178 | 2.5 |
| Total votes | | 145,495 | 100.0 |
| Democratic hold | | | |

=== 1992 ===
1992 California State Assembly 7th district election
| Party | Candidate | Votes | % |
|---|---|---|---|
| Democratic | Valerie K. Brown | 99,269 | 60.2 |
| Republican | Janet Nicholas | 59,121 | 35.9 |
| Peace and Freedom | Irv Sutley | 6,358 | 3.9 |
| Total votes | | 164,748 | 100.0 |
| Democratic gain from Republican | | | |

=== 1990 ===
1990 California State Assembly 7th district election
| Party | Candidate | Votes | % |
|---|---|---|---|
| Republican | David Knowles | 82,862 | 51.4 |
| Democratic | Norman S. Waters (incumbent) | 78,490 | 48.6 |
| No party | Christopher Carrillo (write-in) | 13 | 0.0 |
| Total votes | | 161,365 | 100.0 |
| Republican gain from Democratic | | | |

== See also ==
- California State Assembly
- California State Assembly districts
- Districts in California
