= Norman S. Waters =

American politician

Member of the California State Assembly from the 7th district
- In office December 6, 1976 - November 30, 1990
- Preceded by: John Garamendi
- Succeeded by: David Knowles

Personal details
- Born: July 1, 1925 Plymouth, California, U.S.
- Died: February 26, 2012 (aged 86) Plymouth, California, U.S.
- Party: Democratic
- Spouse: Dona Louis Geis (after 1965)
- Children: 5

Military service
- Allegiance: United States
- Branch/service: United States Army
- Battles/wars: World War II

Norman S. Waters (July 1, 1925 – February 25, 2012) served in the California legislature representing the 7th District. During World War II he served in the United States Army.
