= Jeff Gonzalez =

American politician

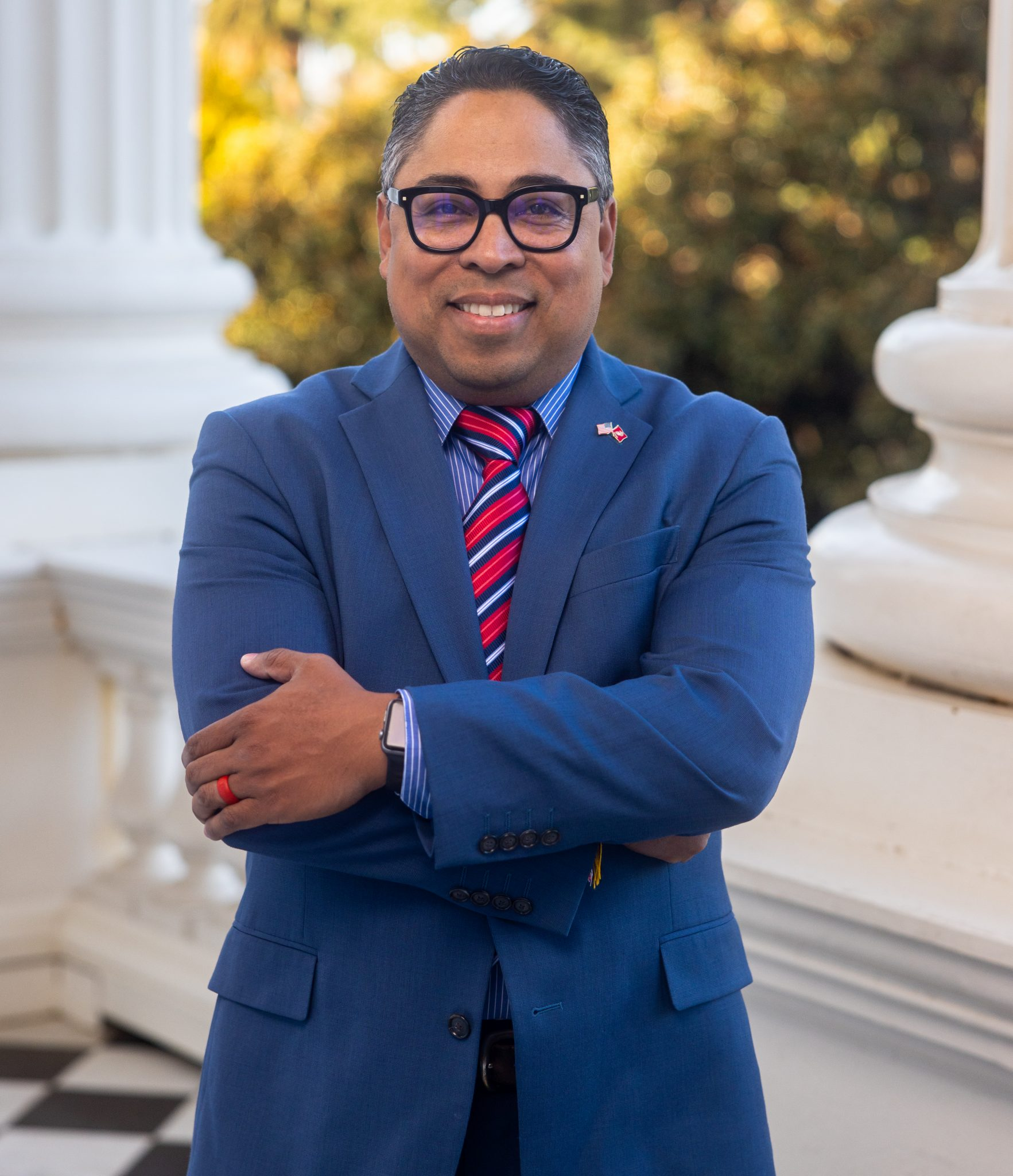
- Official portrait, 2024

Member of the California State Assembly from the 36th district
- Incumbent
- Assumed office December 2, 2024
- Preceded by: Eduardo Garcia

Personal details
- Born: New Jersey
- Party: Republican
- Spouse: Christine
- Children: 4
- Education: National University (BA, MS)

Jeff Gonzalez is an American veteran, businessman, and politician who is a member of the California State Assembly from the 36th District. A Republican, he flipped the majority Latino district in 2024 which includes eastern Riverside County and Imperial County in the Low Desert of southeastern California.

== Early life and education ==
Gonzalez is a first-generation American born in New Jersey and raised in Southern California. He graduated from National University with a Bachelor's in Homeland Security and Emergency Management and a Master of Science in organizational leadership.

== Career ==
Upon graduating high school, Gonzalez enlisted in the United States Marine Corps at 19. He was deployed overseas to combat zones in Iraq and Afghanistan as well as U.S. embassies in Honduras and the Czech Republic. He retired after two decades of service and became a pastor at Southwest Church in Indian Wells and Saddleback Church in Orange County.

== California State Assembly ==
Gonzalez first ran for the California State Assembly in the 56th district against incumbent Democrat Eduardo Garcia in 2018. He lost by a wide margin. He ran again in 2024 after Garcia retired, and defeated Coachella School Board Trustee Joey Acuña in the general election in a major upset.

== Personal life ==
Gonzalez and his wife, Christine, have four children, including an adult son diagnosed with cerebral palsy. They live in Indio, California.

== Electoral history ==
2018 California State Assembly 56th district election
Primary election
Party	Candidate	Votes	%
Democratic	Eduardo Garcia (incumbent)	31,747	60.3
Republican	Jeff Gonzalez	13,331	25.3
Republican	Jonathan Reiss	7,527	14.3
Total votes		52,605	100.0
General election
Democratic	Eduardo Garcia (incumbent)	62,622	64.8
Republican	Jeff Gonzalez	34,088	35.2
Total votes		96,710	100.0
Democratic hold			

2024 California State Assembly 36th district election
Primary election
Party	Candidate	Votes	%
Republican	Jeff Gonzalez	21,626	35.1
Democratic	Joey Acuña	12,262	19.9
Democratic	Edgard Garcia	7,889	12.8
Republican	Kalin Morse	6,985	11.3
Democratic	Waymond Fermon	4,765	7.8
Democratic	Tomas Oliva	4,624	7.5
Democratic	Eric L. Rodriguez	3,458	5.6
Total votes		61,682	100.0
General election
Republican	Jeff Gonzalez	79,477	51.8
Democratic	Joey Acuña	73,926	48.2
Total votes		153,403	100.0
Republican gain from Democratic			

2026 California State Assembly 36th district election
Primary election
Party	Candidate	Votes	%
Republican	Jeff Gonzalez (incumbent)	36,315	44.6
Democratic	Ida Obeso-Martinez	19,586	24.1
Democratic	Oscar Ortiz	17,919	22.0
Democratic	Tomás Oliva	7,560	9.3
Total votes		81,380	100.0
