= 2018 California State Assembly election =

- November 6, 2018

All 80 seats in the California State Assembly 41 seats needed for a majority
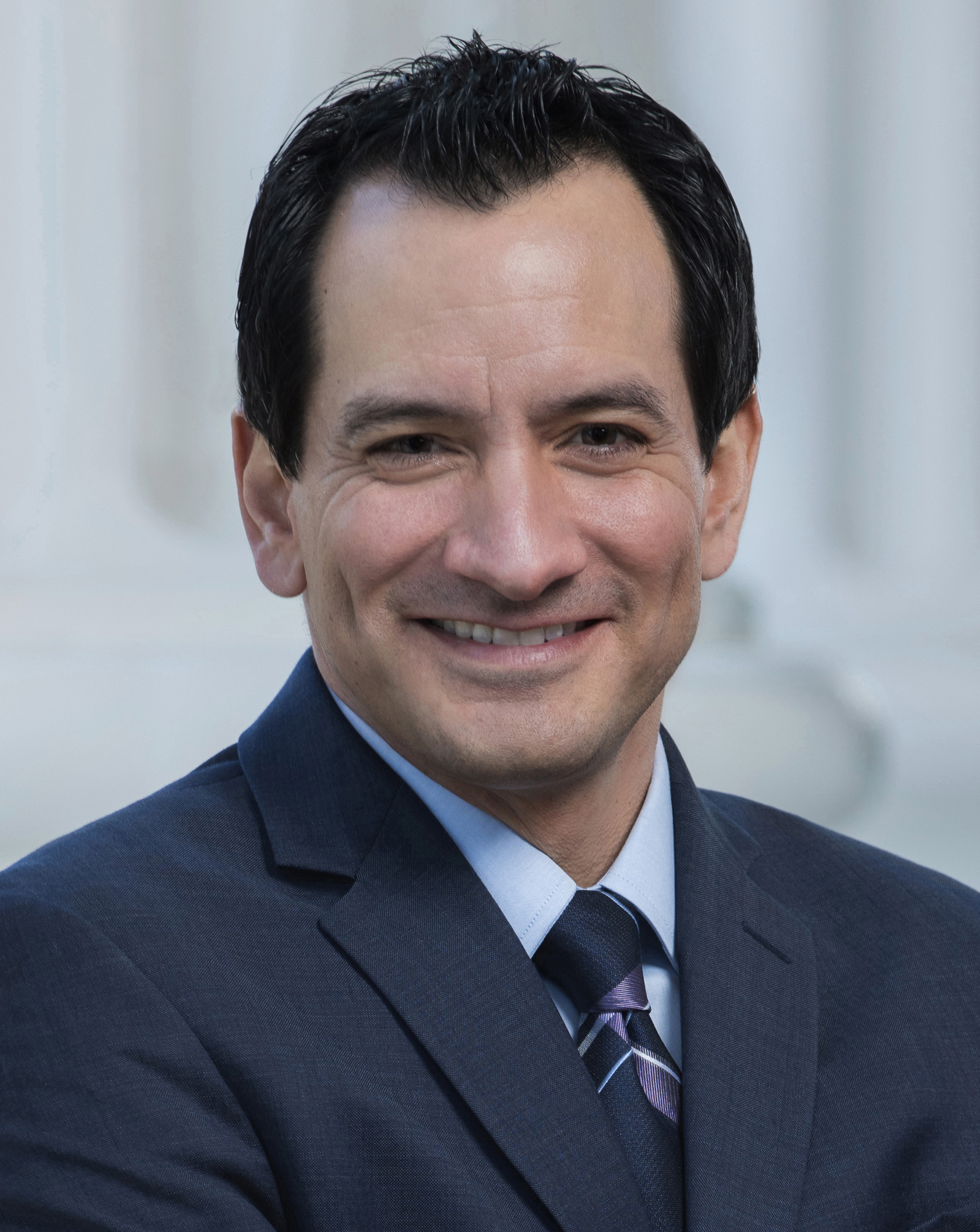

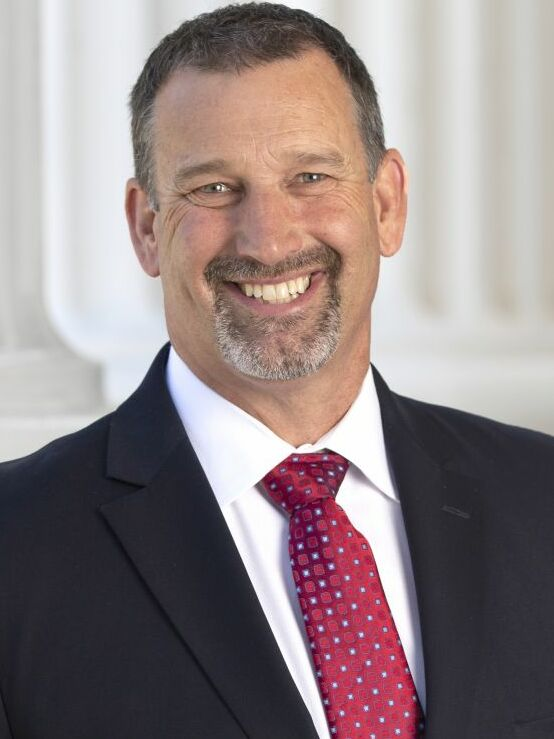
	Majority party	Minority party
Leader	Anthony Rendon	Brian Dahle
Party	Democratic	Republican
Leader since	March 7, 2016	September 16, 2017
Leader's seat	63rd–Lakewood	1st–Bieber
Last election	55 seats, 61.08%	25 seats, 37.36%
Seats won	60	20
Seat change	▲5	▼5
Popular vote	7,872,315	3,710,882
Percentage	66.76%	31.47%
Swing	▲5.68pp	▼5.89pp
- Democratic gain Democratic hold Republican hold 50–60% 60–70% 70–80% 80–90% >90% 50–60% 60–70% 70–80%
Speaker before election
Anthony Rendon
Democratic
Elected Speaker
Anthony Rendon
Democratic

The 2018 California State Assembly election was held on Tuesday, November 6, 2018, with the primary election being held on June 5, 2018. Voters in the 80 districts of the California State Assembly elected their representatives. The election coincided with those for other offices, including for governor and the California State Senate.

The Democratic Party flipped five Republican seats: the 16th, 38th, 40th, 74th, and 76th districts. These victories gave the Democrats a three-fourths supermajority of 60 seats, building upon the two-thirds supermajority that they gained in the previous election cycle.

== Predictions ==
Source	Ranking	As of
Governing	Safe D	October 8, 2018

== Overview ==
California State Assembly election, 2018 Primary election — June 5, 2018
Party	Votes	Percentage	Candidates	Advancing to general	Seats contesting
Democratic	3,977,057	63.65%	140	91	80
Republican	2,221,851	35.56%	85	59	59
Libertarian	24,664	0.39%	10	5	5
Green	14,462	0.23%	4	0	0
No party preference	10,105	0.16%	4	1	1
Totals	6,248,139	100.00%	243	156	—

California State Assembly election, 2018 General election — November 6, 2018
Party	Votes	Percentage	Seats	+/–
Democratic	7,872,315	66.76%	60	▲5
Republican	3,710,882	31.47%	20	▼5
Libertarian	145,514	1.23%	0	0
No party preference	63,272	0.54%	0	0
Valid votes	11,791,983		—	—
Invalid votes			—	—
Totals		100.00%	80	—
Voter turnout	64.5%			

== Results ==
Source: Official results.

=== District 1 ===
California's 1st State Assembly district election, 2018
Primary election
Party	Candidate	Votes	%
Republican	Brian Dahle (incumbent)	82,916	64.1
Democratic	Caleen Sisk	30,902	23.9
Democratic	Peter Van Peborgh	11,446	8.9
No party preference	Jenny O'Connell-Nowain	3,987	3.1
No party preference	Jerome B.C. Venus (write-in)	9	0.0
Total votes		129,260	100.0
General election
Republican	Brian Dahle (incumbent)	125,227	63.0
Democratic	Caleen Sisk	73,449	37.0
Total votes		198,676	100.0
Republican hold			

=== District 2 ===
California's 2nd State Assembly district election, 2018
Primary election
Party	Candidate	Votes	%
Democratic	Jim Wood (incumbent)	80,178	69.6
Republican	Matt Heath	34,975	30.4
Total votes		115,153	100.0
General election
Democratic	Jim Wood (incumbent)	128,444	69.4
Republican	Matt Heath	56,549	30.6
Total votes		184,993	100.0
Democratic hold			

=== District 3 ===
California's 3rd State Assembly district election, 2018
Primary election
Party	Candidate	Votes	%
Republican	James Gallagher (incumbent)	64,975	65.0
Democratic	Sonia Aery	34,941	35.0
Total votes		99,916	100.0
General election
Republican	James Gallagher (incumbent)	95,786	60.2
Democratic	Sonia Aery	63,445	39.8
Total votes		159,231	100.0
Republican hold			

=== District 4 ===
California's 4th State Assembly district election, 2018
Primary election
Party	Candidate	Votes	%
Democratic	Cecilia Aguiar-Curry (incumbent)	77,882	99.5
Libertarian	Brandon Z. Nelson (write-in)	132	0.2
Republican	Cherylyn A. Nutting (write-in)	130	0.2
Green	Sarah Joan Fulton (write-in)	128	0.2
Total votes		78,272	100.0
General election
Democratic	Cecilia Aguiar-Curry (incumbent)	122,657	75.2
Libertarian	Brandon Z. Nelson	40,398	24.8
Total votes		163,055	100.0
Democratic hold			

=== District 5 ===
California's 5th State Assembly district election, 2018
Primary election
Party	Candidate	Votes	%
Republican	Frank Bigelow (incumbent)	72,983	62.4
Democratic	Carla J. Neal	43,983	37.6
Total votes		116,966	100.0
General election
Republican	Frank Bigelow (incumbent)	106,791	59.9
Democratic	Carla J. Neal	71,488	40.1
Total votes		178,279	100.0
Republican hold			

=== District 6 ===
California's 6th State Assembly district election, 2018
Primary election
Party	Candidate	Votes	%
Republican	Kevin Kiley (incumbent)	80,843	61.3
Democratic	Jacalyn "Jackie" Smith	50,953	38.7
Total votes		131,796	100.0
General election
Republican	Kevin Kiley (incumbent)	131,284	58.0
Democratic	Jacalyn "Jackie" Smith	94,984	42.0
Total votes		226,268	100.0
Republican hold			

=== District 7 ===
California's 7th State Assembly district election, 2018
Primary election
Party	Candidate	Votes	%
Democratic	Kevin McCarty (incumbent)	63,705	99.6
Republican	Scott Schmidt (write-in)	237	0.4
Total votes		63,942	100.0
General election
Democratic	Kevin McCarty (incumbent)	107,849	71.3
Republican	Scott Schmidt	43,361	28.7
Total votes		151,210	100.0
Democratic hold			

=== District 8 ===
California's 8th State Assembly district election, 2018
Primary election
Party	Candidate	Votes	%
Democratic	Ken Cooley (incumbent)	53,490	53.9
Republican	Melinda Avey	40,792	41.1
Libertarian	Janice Marlae Bonser	3,017	3.0
No party preference	Lawrence Ray Murray	2,025	2.0
Total votes		99,324	100.0
General election
Democratic	Ken Cooley (incumbent)	95,450	55.8
Republican	Melinda Avey	75,742	44.2
Total votes		171,192	100.0
Democratic hold			

=== District 9 ===
California's 9th State Assembly district election, 2018
Primary election
Party	Candidate	Votes	%
Democratic	Jim Cooper (incumbent)	49,675	67.8
Democratic	Harry He	11,927	16.3
Democratic	Mario Garcia	11,643	15.9
Total votes		73,245	100.0
General election
Democratic	Jim Cooper (incumbent)	92,951	68.3
Democratic	Harry He	43,225	31.7
Total votes		136,176	100.0
Democratic hold			

=== District 10 ===
California's 10th State Assembly district election, 2018
Primary election
Party	Candidate	Votes	%
Democratic	Marc Levine (incumbent)	97,186	80.4
Democratic	Dan Monte	23,637	19.6
Total votes		120,823	100.0
General election
Democratic	Marc Levine (incumbent)	139,050	71.7
Democratic	Dan Monte	54,758	28.3
Total votes		193,808	100.0
Democratic hold			

=== District 11 ===
California's 11th State Assembly district election, 2018
Primary election
Party	Candidate	Votes	%
Democratic	Jim Frazier (incumbent)	39,095	48.3
Republican	Lisa Romero	30,623	37.8
Democratic	Diane Stewart	11,224	13.9
Total votes		80,942	100.0
General election
Democratic	Jim Frazier (incumbent)	96,254	61.5
Republican	Lisa Romero	60,335	38.5
Total votes		156,589	100.0
Democratic hold			

=== District 12 ===
California's 12th State Assembly district election, 2018
Primary election
Party	Candidate	Votes	%
Republican	Heath Flora (incumbent)	56,212	63.9
Democratic	Robert D. Chase	31,811	36.1
Total votes		88,023	100.0
General election
Republican	Heath Flora (incumbent)	94,404	60.0
Democratic	Robert D. Chase	62,811	40.0
Total votes		157,215	100.0
Republican hold			

=== District 13 ===
California's 13th State Assembly district election, 2018
Primary election
Party	Candidate	Votes	%
Democratic	Susan Eggman (incumbent)	30,826	52.6
Republican	Antonio M. Garcia	17,885	30.5
Democratic	Carlos Villapudua	9,888	16.9
Total votes		58,599	100.0
General election
Democratic	Susan Eggman (incumbent)	74,813	65.4
Republican	Antonio M. Garcia	39,532	34.6
Total votes		114,345	100.0
Democratic hold			

=== District 14 ===
California's 14th State Assembly district election, 2018
Primary election
Party	Candidate	Votes	%
Democratic	Tim Grayson (incumbent)	67,272	83.6
Democratic	Aasim Yahya	13,231	16.4
Total votes		80,503	100.0
General election
Democratic	Tim Grayson (incumbent)	109,108	71.6
Democratic	Aasim Yahya	43,292	28.4
Total votes		152,400	100.0
Democratic hold			

=== District 15 ===
California's 15th State Assembly district election, 2018
Primary election
Party	Candidate	Votes	%
Democratic	Buffy Wicks	37,141	31.4
Democratic	Jovanka Beckles	18,733	15.8
Democratic	Dan Kalb	18,007	15.2
Democratic	Judy Appel	13,591	11.5
Democratic	Rochelle Pardue-Okimoto	9,826	8.3
Republican	Pranav Jandhyala	6,946	5.9
Democratic	Andy Katz	6,209	5.2
Democratic	Ben Bartlett	3,949	3.3
Democratic	Cheryl Sudduth	1,493	1.2
Democratic	Raquella Thaman	1,007	0.9
Democratic	Owen Poindexter	819	0.7
Democratic	Sergey Vikramsingh Piterman	689	0.6
Total votes		118,410	100.0
General election
Democratic	Buffy Wicks	104,583	53.6
Democratic	Jovanka Beckles	90,405	46.4
Total votes		194,988	100.0
Democratic hold			

=== District 16 ===
California's 16th State Assembly district election, 2018
Primary election
Party	Candidate	Votes	%
Republican	Catharine Baker (incumbent)	69,360	56.6
Democratic	Rebecca Bauer-Kahan	53,269	43.4
Total votes		122,629	100.0
General election
Democratic	Rebecca Bauer-Kahan	111,222	51.0
Republican	Catharine Baker (incumbent)	106,683	49.0
Total votes		217,905	100.0
Democratic gain from Republican			

=== District 17 ===
California's 17th State Assembly district election, 2018
Primary election
Party	Candidate	Votes	%
Democratic	David Chiu (incumbent)	93,212	81.9
Democratic	Alejandro Fernandez	20,639	18.1
Total votes		113,851	100.0
General election
Democratic	David Chiu (incumbent)	140,381	75.5
Democratic	Alejandro Fernandez	45,483	24.5
Total votes		185,864	100.0
Democratic hold			

=== District 18 ===
California's 18th State Assembly district election, 2018
Primary election
Party	Candidate	Votes	%
Democratic	Rob Bonta (incumbent)	85,354	89.0
Republican	Stephen Slauson	10,549	11.0
Total votes		95,903	100.0
General election
Democratic	Rob Bonta (incumbent)	150,862	88.9
Republican	Stephen Slauson	18,894	11.1
Total votes		184,754	100.0
Democratic hold			

=== District 19 ===
California's 19th State Assembly district election, 2018
Primary election
Party	Candidate	Votes	%
Democratic	Phil Ting (incumbent)	86,304	80.5
Republican	Keith Bogdon	16,785	15.7
No party preference	David Ernst	4,084	3.8
Total votes		107,173	100.0
General election
Democratic	Phil Ting (incumbent)	154,705	83.7
Republican	Keith Bogdon	30,049	16.3
Total votes		184,754	100.0
Democratic hold			

=== District 20 ===
California's 20th State Assembly district election, 2018
Primary election
Party	Candidate	Votes	%
Democratic	Bill Quirk (incumbent)	56,762	99.9
Republican	Joseph Grcar (write-in)	81	0.1
Total votes		56,843	100.0
General election
Democratic	Bill Quirk (incumbent)	105,848	77.4
Republican	Joseph Grcar	30,863	22.6
Total votes		136,711	100.0
Democratic hold			

=== District 21 ===
California's 21st State Assembly district election, 2018
Primary election
Party	Candidate	Votes	%
Democratic	Adam Gray (incumbent)	43,023	99.9
Libertarian	Justin Ryan Quigley (write-in)	49	0.1
Total votes		43,072	100.0
General election
Democratic	Adam Gray (incumbent)	74,320	71.3
Libertarian	Justin Ryan Quigley	29,855	28.7
Total votes		104,175	100.0
Democratic hold			

=== District 22 ===
California's 22nd State Assembly district election, 2018
Primary election
Party	Candidate	Votes	%
Democratic	Kevin Mullin (incumbent)	80,610	74.1
Republican	Christina Laskowski	24,104	22.2
Green	Bridget Duffy	4,106	3.8
Total votes		108,820	100.0
General election
Democratic	Kevin Mullin (incumbent)	145,197	76.8
Republican	Christina Laskowski	43,927	23.2
Total votes		189,124	100.0
Democratic hold			

=== District 23 ===
California's 23rd State Assembly district election, 2018
Primary election
Party	Candidate	Votes	%
Republican	Jim Patterson (incumbent)	58,927	64.9
Democratic	Aileen Rizo	31,902	35.1
Total votes		90,829	100.0
General election
Republican	Jim Patterson (incumbent)	98,789	59.4
Democratic	Aileen Rizo	67,443	40.6
Total votes		166,232	100.0
Republican hold			

=== District 24 ===
California's 24th State Assembly district election, 2018
Primary election
Party	Candidate	Votes	%
Democratic	Marc Berman (incumbent)	78,140	75.4
Republican	Alex Glew	21,818	21.0
Libertarian	Bob Goodwyn	3,694	3.6
Total votes		103,652	100.0
General election
Democratic	Marc Berman (incumbent)	135,305	76.6
Republican	Alex Glew	41,313	23.4
Total votes		176,618	100.0
Democratic hold			

=== District 25 ===
California's 25th State Assembly district election, 2018
Primary election
Party	Candidate	Votes	%
Democratic	Kansen Chu (incumbent)	36,417	51.8
Republican	Bob Brunton	16,391	23.3
Democratic	Carmen Montano	15,345	21.8
Libertarian	Robert Imhoff	2,127	3.0
Total votes		70,280	100.0
General election
Democratic	Kansen Chu (incumbent)	98,612	74.3
Republican	Bob Brunton	34,193	25.7
Total votes		132,805	100.0
Democratic hold			

=== District 26 ===
California's 26th State Assembly district election, 2018
Primary election
Party	Candidate	Votes	%
Republican	Devon Mathis (incumbent)	19,081	30.3
Democratic	Jose Sigala	18,794	29.8
Republican	Warren Gubler	17,650	28.0
Republican	Jack Lavers	7,473	11.9
Total votes		62,998	100.0
General election
Republican	Devon Mathis (incumbent)	62,629	57.9
Democratic	Jose Sigala	45,558	42.1
Total votes		108,187	100.0
Republican hold			

=== District 27 ===
California's 27th State Assembly district election, 2018
Primary election
Party	Candidate	Votes	%
Democratic	Ash Kalra (incumbent)	51,825	99.5
Republican	G. Burt Lancaster (write-in)	285	0.5
Total votes		52,110	100.0
General election
Democratic	Ash Kalra (incumbent)	90,068	76.3
Republican	G. Burt Lancaster	27,990	23.7
Total votes		118,058	100.0
Democratic hold			

=== District 28 ===
California's 28th State Assembly district election, 2018
Primary election
Party	Candidate	Votes	%
Democratic	Evan Low (incumbent)	77,011	70.8
Republican	Michael L. Snyder	31,776	29.2
Total votes		108,787	100.0
General election
Democratic	Evan Low (incumbent)	130,815	71.1
Republican	Michael L. Snyder	53,195	28.9
Total votes		184,010	100.0
Democratic hold			

=== District 29 ===
California's 29th State Assembly district election, 2018
Primary election
Party	Candidate	Votes	%
Democratic	Mark Stone (incumbent)	86,641	72.4
Republican	Vicki L. Nohrden	33,073	27.6
Total votes		119,714	100.0
General election
Democratic	Mark Stone (incumbent)	147,237	71.8
Republican	Vicki L. Nohrden	57,714	28.2
Total votes		204,951	100.0
Democratic hold			

=== District 30 ===
California's 30th State Assembly district election, 2018
Primary election
Party	Candidate	Votes	%
Democratic	Robert Rivas	30,379	45.5
Republican	Neil G. Kitchens	20,099	30.1
Democratic	Peter Leroe-Muñoz	7,099	10.6
Democratic	Trina Coffman-Gomez	5,003	7.5
Democratic	Bill Lipe	4,217	6.3
Total votes		66,797	100.0
General election
Democratic	Robert Rivas	83,162	68.3
Republican	Neil G. Kitchens	38,719	31.8
Total votes		121,881	100.0
Democratic hold			

=== District 31 ===
California's 31st State Assembly district election, 2018
Primary election
Party	Candidate	Votes	%
Democratic	Joaquin Arambula (incumbent)	24,128	59.5
Republican	Lupe Espinoza	16,431	40.5
Total votes		40,559	100.0
General election
Democratic	Joaquin Arambula (incumbent)	54,921	64.8
Republican	Lupe Espinoza	29,771	35.2
Total votes		84,692	100.0
Democratic hold			

=== District 32 ===
California's 32nd State Assembly district election, 2018
Primary election
Party	Candidate	Votes	%
Democratic	Rudy Salas (incumbent)	16,690	50.4
Republican	Justin Mendes	16,438	49.6
Total votes		33,128	100.0
General election
Democratic	Rudy Salas (incumbent)	39,328	56.7
Republican	Justin Mendes	30,089	43.3
Total votes		69,417	100.0
Democratic hold			

=== District 33 ===
California's 33rd State Assembly district election, 2018
Primary election
Party	Candidate	Votes	%
Republican	Jay Obernolte (incumbent)	43,100	65.8
Democratic	Socorro Cisneros	12,566	19.2
Democratic	Scott Markovich	9,854	15.0
Total votes		65,520	100.0
General election
Republican	Jay Obernolte (incumbent)	72,109	60.2
Democratic	Socorro Cisneros	47,603	39.8
Total votes		119,712	100.0
Republican hold			

=== District 34 ===
California's 34th State Assembly district election, 2018
Primary election
Party	Candidate	Votes	%
Republican	Vince Fong (incumbent)	65,323	76.4
Democratic	Nick Nicita	20,221	23.6
Total votes		85,544	100.0
General election
Republican	Vince Fong (incumbent)	103,346	70.6
Democratic	Nick Nicita	43,048	29.4
Total votes		146,394	100.0
Republican hold			

=== District 35 ===
California's 35th State Assembly district election, 2018
Primary election
Party	Candidate	Votes	%
Republican	Jordan Cunningham (incumbent)	62,348	55.5
Democratic	Bill Ostrander	49,967	44.5
Total votes		112,315	100.0
General election
Republican	Jordan Cunningham (incumbent)	97,749	55.9
Democratic	Bill Ostrander	76,994	44.1
Total votes		174,743	100.0
Republican hold			

=== District 36 ===
California's 36th State Assembly district election, 2018
Primary election
Party	Candidate	Votes	%
Republican	Tom Lackey (incumbent)	35,628	60.3
Democratic	Steve Fox	23,447	39.7
Total votes		59,075	100.0
General election
Republican	Tom Lackey (incumbent)	66,584	52.1
Democratic	Steve Fox	61,310	47.9
Total votes		127,894	100.0
Republican hold			

=== District 37 ===
California's 37th State Assembly district election, 2018
Primary election
Party	Candidate	Votes	%
Democratic	Monique Limón (incumbent)	69,382	84.3
Democratic	David L. Norrdin	7,487	9.1
Democratic	Sofia Collin	5,409	6.6
Total votes		82,278	100.0
General election
Democratic	Monique Limón (incumbent)	129,535	80.4
Democratic	David L. Norrdin	31,522	19.6
Total votes		161,057	100.0
Democratic hold			

=== District 38 ===
California's 38th State Assembly district election, 2018
Primary election
Party	Candidate	Votes	%
Republican	Dante Acosta (incumbent)	49,825	53.6
Democratic	Christy Smith	43,050	46.4
Total votes		92,875	100.0
General election
Democratic	Christy Smith	95,751	51.5
Republican	Dante Acosta (incumbent)	90,298	48.5
Total votes		186,049	100.0
Democratic gain from Republican			

=== District 39 ===
California's 39th State Assembly district election, 2018
Primary election
Party	Candidate	Votes	%
Democratic	Luz Rivas (incumbent)	20,453	43.9
Republican	Ricardo Antonio Benitez	11,679	25.1
Democratic	Patty López	6,783	14.6
Democratic	Antonio Sanchez	4,705	10.1
Democratic	Patrea Patrick	1,740	3.7
Democratic	Bonnie Corwin	1,220	2.6
Total votes		46,580	100.0
General election
Democratic	Luz Rivas (incumbent)	85,027	77.7
Republican	Ricardo Antonio Benitez	24,468	22.3
Total votes		109,495	100.0
Democratic hold			

=== District 40 ===
California's 40th State Assembly district election, 2018
Primary election
Party	Candidate	Votes	%
Republican	Henry Gomez Nickel	29,550	45.7
Democratic	James Ramos	26,297	40.7
Democratic	Libbern Gwen Cook	8,777	13.6
Total votes		64,624	100.0
General election
Democratic	James Ramos	77,585	59.6
Republican	Henry Gomez Nickel	52,746	40.5
Total votes		130,331	100.0
Democratic gain from Republican			

=== District 41 ===
California's 41st State Assembly district election, 2018
Primary election
Party	Candidate	Votes	%
Democratic	Chris Holden (incumbent)	54,707	59.8
No party preference	Alan S. Reynolds	25,345	27.7
Democratic	Kenneth (Kenny) Rotter	11,420	12.5
Total votes		91,472	100.0
General election
Democratic	Chris Holden (incumbent)	113,439	64.2
No party preference	Alan S. Reynolds	63,272	35.8
Total votes		176,711	100.0
Democratic hold			

==== Endorsements ====
Alan S. Reynolds (NPP)

Organizations

- Modern Whig Party
- Reform Party of the United States of America

=== District 42 ===
California's 42nd State Assembly district election, 2018
Primary election
Party	Candidate	Votes	%
Democratic	DeniAntionette Mazingo	33,586	35.6
Republican	Chad Mayes (incumbent)	30,880	32.8
Republican	Gary Jeandron	15,032	16.0
Republican	Andrew F. Kotyuk	11,572	12.3
Green	Carol Bouldin	3,166	3.4
Total votes		94,236	100.0
General election
Republican	Chad Mayes (incumbent)	86,333	55.3
Democratic	DeniAntionette Mazingo	69,747	44.7
Total votes		156,080	100.0
Republican hold			

=== District 43 ===
California's 43rd State Assembly district election, 2018
Primary election
Party	Candidate	Votes	%
Democratic	Laura Friedman (incumbent)	58,310	100.0
Total votes		58,310	100.0
General election
Democratic	Laura Friedman (incumbent)	125,568	100.0
Total votes		125,568	100.0
Democratic hold			

=== District 44 ===
California's 44th State Assembly district election, 2018
Primary election
Party	Candidate	Votes	%
Democratic	Jacqui Irwin (incumbent)	44,028	51.9
Republican	Ronda Baldwin-Kennedy	37,342	44.0
Democratic	Robert Zelinsky	3,411	4.0
Total votes		84,781	100.0
General election
Democratic	Jacqui Irwin (incumbent)	95,622	58.9
Republican	Ronda Baldwin-Kennedy	66,758	42.1
Total votes		162,380	100.0
Democratic hold			

=== District 45 ===
California's 45th State Assembly district election, 2018
Primary election
Party	Candidate	Votes	%
Democratic	Jesse Gabriel	31,068	43.7
Republican	Justin M. Clark	22,709	31.9
Democratic	Tricia Robbins Kasson	5,277	7.4
Democratic	Ankur Patel	4,534	6.4
Democratic	Jeff Bornstein	4,039	5.7
Democratic	Daniel Brin	2,432	3.4
Democratic	Ray Bishop	1,088	1.5
Total votes		71,147	100.0
General election
Democratic	Jesse Gabriel (incumbent)	107,757	70.3
Republican	Justin M. Clark	45,619	29.7
Total votes		153,376	100.0
Democratic hold			

=== District 46 ===
California's 46th State Assembly district election, 2018
Primary election
Party	Candidate	Votes	%
Democratic	Adrin Nazarian (incumbent)	51,896	79.1
Republican	Roxanne Beckford Hoge	13,672	20.9
Total votes		65,568	100.0
General election
Democratic	Adrin Nazarian (incumbent)	109,938	79.3
Republican	Roxanne Beckford Hoge	28,784	20.7
Total votes		138,722	100.0
Democratic hold			

=== District 47 ===
California's 47th State Assembly district election, 2018
Primary election
Party	Candidate	Votes	%
Democratic	Eloise Reyes (incumbent)	30,629	100.0
Total votes		30,629	100.0
General election
Democratic	Eloise Reyes (incumbent)	77,458	100.0
Total votes		77,458	100.0
Democratic hold			

=== District 48 ===
California's 48th State Assembly district election, 2018
Primary election
Party	Candidate	Votes	%
Democratic	Blanca Rubio (incumbent)	33,144	100.0
Total votes		33,144	100.0
General election
Democratic	Blanca Rubio (incumbent)	90,105	100.0
Total votes		90,105	100.0
Democratic hold			

=== District 49 ===
California's 49th State Assembly district election, 2018
Primary election
Party	Candidate	Votes	%
Democratic	Ed Chau (incumbent)	35,365	69.0
Republican	Burton Brink	15,910	31.0
Total votes		46,349	100.0
General election
Democratic	Ed Chau (incumbent)	75,421	71.2
Republican	Burton Brink	30,506	28.8
Total votes		105,927	100.0
Democratic hold			

=== District 50 ===
California's 50th State Assembly district election, 2018
Primary election
Party	Candidate	Votes	%
Democratic	Richard Bloom (incumbent)	79,458	100.0
Total votes		79,458	100.0
General election
Democratic	Richard Bloom (incumbent)	167,428	100.0
Total votes		167,428	100.0
Democratic hold			

=== District 51 ===
California's 51st State Assembly district election, 2018
Primary election
Party	Candidate	Votes	%
Democratic	Wendy Carrillo (incumbent)	42,547	100.0
Libertarian	Christopher Stare (write-in)	4	0.0
Total votes		42,551	100.0
General election
Democratic	Wendy Carrillo (incumbent)	102,276	86.6
Libertarian	Christopher Stare	15,769	13.4
Total votes		118,045	100.0
Democratic hold			

=== District 52 ===
California's 52nd State Assembly district election, 2018
Primary election
Party	Candidate	Votes	%
Democratic	Freddie Rodriguez (incumbent)	21,736	48.0
Republican	Toni Holle	16,087	35.5
Democratic	Frank C. Guzman	6,297	13.9
Libertarian	Ben W. Gibbons	1,205	2.7
Total votes		45,325	100.0
General election
Democratic	Freddie Rodriguez (incumbent)	70,507	68.6
Republican	Toni Holle	32,273	31.4
Total votes		102,780	100.0
Democratic hold			

=== District 53 ===
California's 53rd State Assembly district election, 2018
Primary election
Party	Candidate	Votes	%
Democratic	Miguel Santiago (incumbent)	24,134	69.0
Democratic	Kevin Hee Young Jang	5,779	16.5
Libertarian	Michael A. Lewis	2,710	7.7
Democratic	Rae Elisabeth Henry	2,367	6.8
Total votes		34,990	100.0
General election
Democratic	Miguel Santiago (incumbent)	57,388	71.4
Democratic	Kevin Hee Young Jang	23,002	28.6
Total votes		80,390	100.0
Democratic hold			

=== District 54 ===
California's 54th State Assembly district election, 2018
Primary election
Party	Candidate	Votes	%
Democratic	Sydney Kamlager (incumbent)	41,838	55.5
Democratic	Tepring Michelle Piquado	11,615	15.4
Republican	Glen Ratcliff	9,359	12.4
Democratic	Steve Dunwoody	6,409	8.5
Democratic	Lamar Lyons	4,899	6.5
Democratic	Breon Dupree Hollie	1,223	1.6
Total votes		75,343	100.0
General election
Democratic	Sydney Kamlager (incumbent)	95,643	62.3
Democratic	Tepring Michelle Piquado	57,760	37.7
Total votes		153,403	100.0
Democratic hold			

=== District 55 ===
California's 55th State Assembly district election, 2018
Primary election
Party	Candidate	Votes	%
Republican	Phillip Chen (incumbent)	42,664	47.2
Democratic	Gregg D. Fritchle	20,441	22.6
Democratic	Melissa Fazli	14,016	15.5
Republican	James G. Gerbus	9,731	10.8
Republican	Scott Lebda	3,571	3.9
Total votes		90,423	100.0
General election
Republican	Phillip Chen (incumbent)	87,928	54.9
Democratic	Gregg D. Fritchle	72,256	45.1
Total votes		160,184	100.0
Republican hold			

=== District 56 ===
California's 56th State Assembly district election, 2018
Primary election
Party	Candidate	Votes	%
Democratic	Eduardo Garcia (incumbent)	31,747	60.3
Republican	Jeff Gonzalez	13,331	25.3
Republican	Jonathan Reiss	7,527	14.3
Total votes		52,605	100.0
General election
Democratic	Eduardo Garcia (incumbent)	62,622	64.8
Republican	Jeff Gonzalez	34,088	35.2
Total votes		96,710	100.0
Democratic hold			

=== District 57 ===
California's 57th State Assembly district election, 2018
Primary election
Party	Candidate	Votes	%
Democratic	Ian Calderon (incumbent)	27,136	46.6
Republican	Jessica Martinez	13,824	23.7
Republican	Oscar J. Llamas	9,025	15.5
Democratic	Justin Joshua Valero	6,829	11.7
Democratic	Blake Sullivan Carter	1,393	2.4
Total votes		57,331	100.0
General election
Democratic	Ian Calderon (incumbent)	84,159	64.9
Republican	Jessica Martinez	45,492	35.1
Total votes		129,651	100.0
Democratic hold			

=== District 58 ===
California's 58th State Assembly district election, 2018
Primary election
Party	Candidate	Votes	%
Democratic	Cristina Garcia (incumbent)	14,509	28.9
Republican	Mike Simpfenderfer	13,246	26.4
Democratic	Pedro Aceituno	6,386	12.7
Democratic	Karla V. Salazar	4,603	9.2
Democratic	Friné (Lore) Medrano	4,447	8.9
Democratic	Ivan Altamirano	3,809	7.6
Democratic	John Paul Drayer	1,653	3.3
Democratic	Miguel Angel Alvarado	1,568	3.1
Total votes		50,221	100.0
General election
Democratic	Cristina Garcia (incumbent)	84,003	70.4
Republican	Mike Simpfenderfer	35,301	29.6
Total votes		119,304	100.0
Democratic hold			

=== District 59 ===
California's 59th State Assembly district election, 2018
Primary election
Party	Candidate	Votes	%
Democratic	Reggie Jones-Sawyer (incumbent)	19,188	76.8
Democratic	Leslie Hagan-Morgan	5,797	23.2
Total votes		24,985	100.0
General election
Democratic	Reggie Jones-Sawyer (incumbent)	47,765	66.9
Democratic	Leslie Hagan-Morgan	23,653	33.1
Total votes		71,418	100.0
Democratic hold			

=== District 60 ===
California's 60th State Assembly district election, 2018
Primary election
Party	Candidate	Votes	%
Republican	Bill Essayli	30,639	52.9
Democratic	Sabrina Cervantes (incumbent)	27,241	47.1
Total votes		57,880	100.0
General election
Democratic	Sabrina Cervantes (incumbent)	67,950	54.1
Republican	Bill Essayli	57,710	45.9
Total votes		125,660	100.0
Democratic hold			

=== District 61 ===
California's 61st State Assembly district election, 2018
Primary election
Party	Candidate	Votes	%
Democratic	Jose Medina (incumbent)	36,442	99.4
Republican	Mohammad-Ali Mazarfi (write-in)	212	0.6
Total votes		36,654	100.0
General election
Democratic	Jose Medina (incumbent)	75,327	67.8
Republican	Mohammad-Ali Mazarfi	35,821	32.2
Total votes		111,148	100.0
Democratic hold			

=== District 62 ===
California's 62nd State Assembly district election, 2018
Primary election
Party	Candidate	Votes	%
Democratic	Autumn Burke (incumbent)	53,479	80.8
Republican	Al L. Hernandez	12,668	19.2
Total votes		66,147	100.0
General election
Democratic	Autumn Burke (incumbent)	123,132	82.9
Republican	Al L. Hernandez	25,356	17.1
Total votes		148,488	100.0
Democratic hold			

=== District 63 ===
California's 63rd State Assembly district election, 2018
Primary election
Party	Candidate	Votes	%
Democratic	Anthony Rendon (incumbent)	18,047	46.6
Democratic	Maria D. Estrada	11,252	29.1
Republican	Adam Joshua Miller	9,419	24.3
Total votes		38,718	100.0
General election
Democratic	Anthony Rendon (incumbent)	49,367	54.3
Democratic	Maria D. Estrada	41,626	45.7
Total votes		90,993	100.0
Democratic hold			

=== District 64 ===
California's 64th State Assembly district election, 2018
Primary election
Party	Candidate	Votes	%
Democratic	Mike Gipson (incumbent)	29,422	100.0
Republican	Theresa Sanford (write-in)	9	0.0
Total votes		29,431	100.0
General election
Democratic	Mike Gipson (incumbent)	83,210	84.7
Republican	Theresa Sanford	15,010	15.3
Total votes		98,220	100.0
Democratic hold			

=== District 65 ===
California's 65th State Assembly district election, 2018
Primary election
Party	Candidate	Votes	%
Democratic	Sharon Quirk-Silva (incumbent)	37,587	52.9
Republican	Alexandria "Alex" Coronado	33,459	47.1
Total votes		71,046	100.0
General election
Democratic	Sharon Quirk-Silva (incumbent)	74,636	57.2
Republican	Alexandria "Alex" Coronado	55,953	42.8
Total votes		130,589	100.0
Democratic hold			

=== District 66 ===
California's 66th State Assembly district election, 2018
Primary election
Party	Candidate	Votes	%
Democratic	Al Muratsuchi (incumbent)	47,976	50.9
Republican	Frank A. Scotto	40,727	43.2
Democratic	Caney Arnold	5,612	6.0
Total votes		88,703	100.0
General election
Democratic	Al Muratsuchi (incumbent)	108,627	60.5
Republican	Frank A. Scotto	71,057	39.5
Total votes		179,684	100.0
Democratic hold			

=== District 67 ===
California's 67th State Assembly district election, 2018
Primary election
Party	Candidate	Votes	%
Republican	Melissa Melendez (incumbent)	54,089	67.1
Democratic	Michelle Singleton	26,474	32.9
Total votes		80,563	100.0
General election
Republican	Melissa Melendez (incumbent)	93,519	60.9
Democratic	Michelle Singleton	60,005	39.1
Total votes		153,524	100.0
Republican hold			

=== District 68 ===
California's 68th State Assembly district election, 2018
Primary election
Party	Candidate	Votes	%
Republican	Steven Choi (incumbent)	57,099	59.0
Democratic	Michelle Duman	39,751	41.0
Total votes		96,850	100.0
General election
Republican	Steven Choi (incumbent)	96,611	53.1
Democratic	Michelle Duman	85,164	46.9
Total votes		181,775	100.0
Republican hold			

=== District 69 ===
California's 69th State Assembly district election, 2018
Primary election
Party	Candidate	Votes	%
Democratic	Tom Daly (incumbent)	30,411	99.7
Libertarian	Autumn Browne (write-in)	81	0.3
Total votes		30,492	100.0
General election
Democratic	Tom Daly (incumbent)	63,054	75.2
Libertarian	Autumn Browne	20,786	24.8
Total votes		83,840	100.0
Democratic hold			

=== District 70 ===
California's 70th State Assembly district election, 2018
Primary election
Party	Candidate	Votes	%
Democratic	Patrick O'Donnell (incumbent)	41,480	59.2
Libertarian	Honor "Mimi" Robson	11,779	16.9
Democratic	Elliot Ruben Gonzales	9,304	13.4
Green	Rachel Alexandra Bruhnke	7,062	10.1
Total votes		69,625	100.0
General election
Democratic	Patrick O'Donnell (incumbent)	103,915	72.9
Libertarian	Honor "Mimi" Robson	38,706	27.1
Total votes		142,621	100.0
Democratic hold			

=== District 71 ===
California's 71st State Assembly district election, 2018
Primary election
Party	Candidate	Votes	%
Republican	Randy Voepel (incumbent)	41,561	43.6
Democratic	James Elia	30,672	32.2
Republican	Larry A. Wilske	23,106	24.2
Total votes		95,339	100.0
General election
Republican	Randy Voepel (incumbent)	100,386	60.6
Democratic	James Elia	65,194	39.4
Total votes		165,580	100.0
Republican hold			

=== District 72 ===
California's 72nd State Assembly district election, 2018
Primary election
Party	Candidate	Votes	%
Democratic	Josh Lowenthal	34,462	36.8
Republican	Tyler Diep	27,825	29.7
Republican	Greg Haskin	19,199	20.5
Republican	Long Pham	7,692	8.2
Republican	Richard Laird	4,555	5.0
Total votes		93,733	100.0
General election
Republican	Tyler Diep	83,221	51.6
Democratic	Josh Lowenthal	78,080	48.4
Total votes		161,301	100.0
Republican hold			

=== District 73 ===
California's 73rd State Assembly district election, 2018
Primary election
Party	Candidate	Votes	%
Republican	Bill Brough (incumbent)	55,579	47.1
Democratic	Scott Rhinehart	46,436	39.4
Republican	Ed Sachs	15,981	13.5
Total votes		117,996	100.0
General election
Republican	Bill Brough (incumbent)	115,636	56.2
Democratic	Scott Rhinehart	90,016	43.8
Total votes		205,652	100.0
Republican hold			

=== District 74 ===
California's 74th State Assembly district election, 2018
Primary election
Party	Candidate	Votes	%
Republican	Matthew Harper (incumbent)	46,500	41.6
Democratic	Cottie Petrie-Norris	31,626	28.3
Democratic	Karina Onofre	13,536	12.1
Republican	Katherine Daigle	12,331	11.0
Democratic	Ryan Ta	7,827	7.0
Total votes		111,820	100.0
General election
Democratic	Cottie Petrie-Norris	105,699	52.7
Republican	Matthew Harper (incumbent)	94,947	47.3
Total votes		200,646	100.0
Democratic gain from Republican			

=== District 75 ===
California's 75th State Assembly district election, 2018
Primary election
Party	Candidate	Votes	%
Republican	Marie Waldron (incumbent)	56,646	61.6
Democratic	Alan Geraci	35,324	38.4
Total votes		91,970	100.0
General election
Republican	Marie Waldron (incumbent)	95,236	56.4
Democratic	Alan Geraci	73,707	43.6
Total votes		168,943	100.0
Republican hold			

=== District 76 ===
California's 76th State Assembly district election, 2018
Primary election
Party	Candidate	Votes	%
Democratic	Elizabeth Warren	28,755	26.2
Democratic	Tasha Boerner Horvath	27,566	25.1
Republican	Philip "Phil" Graham	23,155	21.1
Republican	Maureen "Mo" Muir	9,642	8.8
Republican	Thomas E. Krouse	8,675	7.9
Republican	Amanda Rigby	5,919	5.4
Republican	Jerome Stocks	5,119	4.7
Republican	Brian Wimmer	840	0.8
Total votes		109,671	100.0
General election
Democratic	Tasha Boerner Horvath	79,769	54.6
Democratic	Elizabeth Warren	66,427	45.4
Total votes		146,196	100.0
Democratic gain from Republican			

=== District 77 ===
California's 77th State Assembly district election, 2018
Primary election
Party	Candidate	Votes	%
Republican	Brian Maienschein (incumbent)	63,269	56.1
Democratic	Sunday Gover	49,554	43.9
Total votes		112,823	100.0
General election
Republican	Brian Maienschein (incumbent)	99,880	50.2
Democratic	Sunday Gover	99,273	49.8
Total votes		199,153	100.0
Republican hold			

=== District 78 ===
California's 78th State Assembly district election, 2018
Primary election
Party	Candidate	Votes	%
Democratic	Todd Gloria (incumbent)	79,738	71.2
Republican	Maggie J. Campbell	32,250	28.8
Total votes		111,988	100.0
General election
Democratic	Todd Gloria (incumbent)	140,598	71.1
Republican	Maggie J. Campbell	57,217	28.9
Total votes		197,815	100.0
Democratic hold			

=== District 79 ===
California's 79th State Assembly district election, 2018
Primary election
Party	Candidate	Votes	%
Democratic	Shirley Weber (incumbent)	51,395	63.7
Republican	John Moore	29,324	36.3
Total votes		80,719	100.0
General election
Democratic	Shirley Weber (incumbent)	103,533	66.8
Republican	John Moore	51,548	33.2
Total votes		155,081	100.0
Democratic hold			

=== District 80 ===
California's 80th State Assembly district election, 2018
Primary election
Party	Candidate	Votes	%
Democratic	Lorena Gonzalez Fletcher (incumbent)	38,449	70.5
Republican	Lincoln Pickard	16,107	29.5
Republican	Joseph Viveiros (write-in)	3	0.0
Total votes		54,559	100.0
General election
Democratic	Lorena Gonzalez Fletcher (incumbent)	82,621	75.0
Republican	Lincoln Pickard	27,563	25.0
Total votes		110,184	100.0
Democratic hold			

== See also ==
- 2018 United States elections
- 2018 United States Senate election in California
- 2018 United States House of Representatives elections in California
- 2018 California gubernatorial election
- 2018 California State Senate election
- 2018 California elections
