= George Cleveland (disambiguation) =

George Cleveland may refer to:

- George Cleveland (1885-1957) Canadian actor
- George C. Cleveland (1874-1935), American politician
- George G. Cleveland (born 1939), American politician
