= James B. Holohan =

American politician and warden

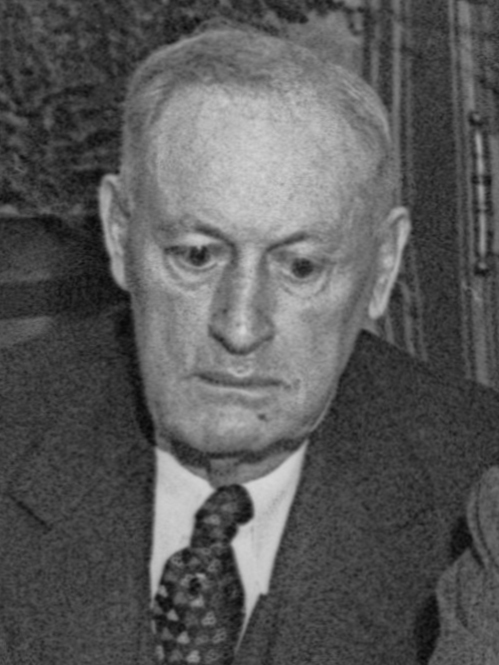
- Holohan in 1936

Member of the California State Senate
- In office January 4, 1937 – January 6, 1941
- Preceded by: Samuel H. Rambo
- Succeeded by: Henry H. Lyon
- Constituency: 29th district
- In office January 4, 1909 – January 6, 1913
- Preceded by: Bert B. Snyder
- Succeeded by: H. R. Judah
- Constituency: 29th district

Personal details
- Born: June 19, 1871 Watsonville, California
- Died: January 31, 1947 (aged 75) Watsonville, California
- Party: Democratic
- Spouse: Adeline V. Fraiser (m. 1902)
- Children: 1

James Bernard Holohan (June 19, 1871 – January 31, 1947) was an American politician and former warden of the San Quentin State Prison who served on the California State Senate from 1909 to 1913 and from 1937 to 1941.

== Early life and education ==
Holohan was born in Watsonville, California to Richard and Catherine Lynch Holohah, both immigrants from Ireland. When he was a teenager, both of his parents died, and he raised his three brothers and his sister while taking care of the family's ranch. In 1892, he started work as an unpaid clerk of a district school board.

== Political career ==
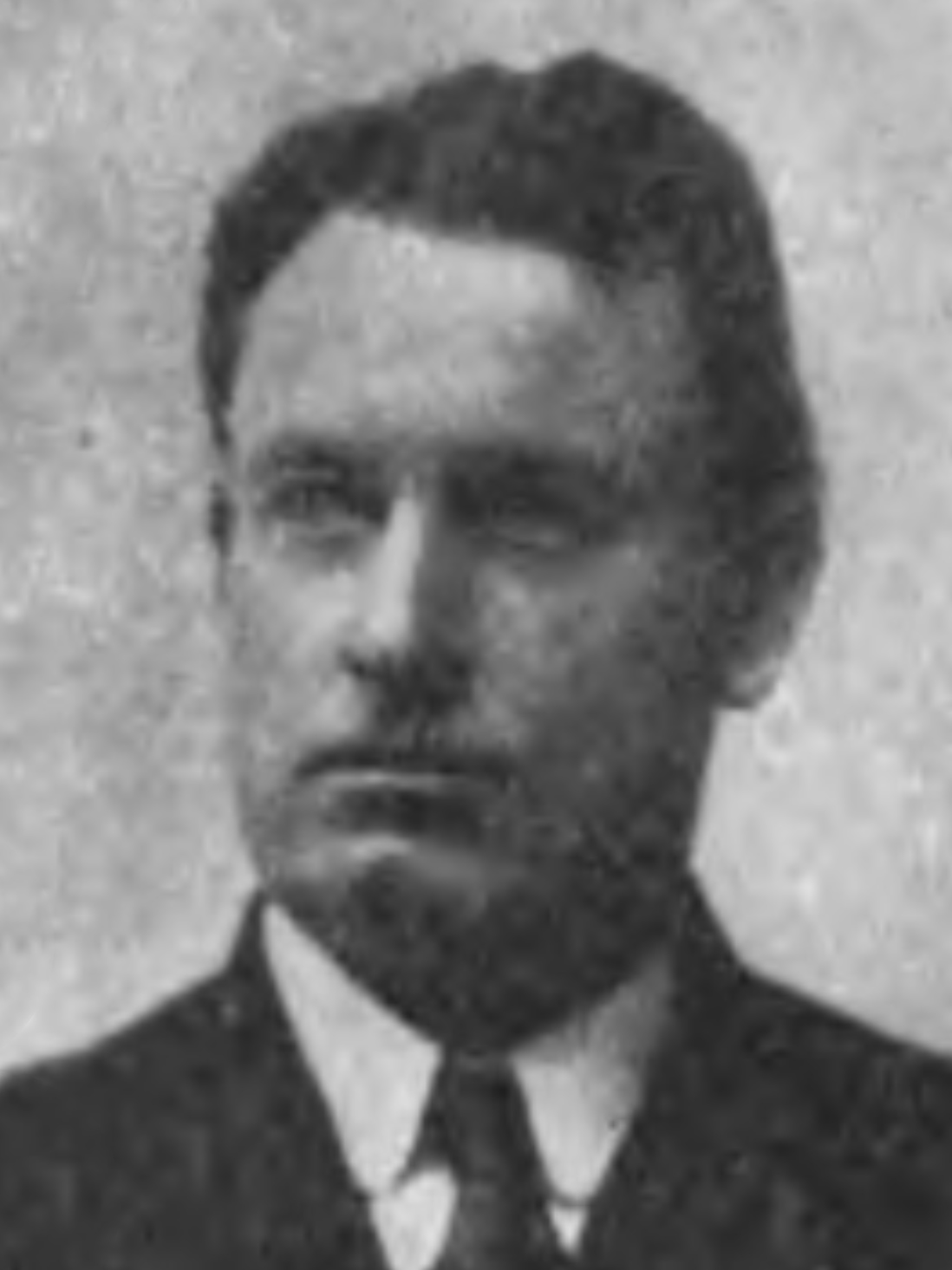
Holohan during his first term in 1909.

In 1904, Holohan ran for California State Assembly for the 54th district, but lost to George C. Cleveland. Four years later, in 1908, he ran for California State Senate for the 29th district, defeating fellow Democrat Hall C. Ross with a plurality of the vote. During his first term, he introduced Act 291, which adopted the Flag of California. In 1912, he ran for U.S. House of Representatives, challenging incumbent Everis A. Hayes but losing in the election. He retired after his first term to be appointed as United States Marshal of the Northern District of California on January 13, 1914, by President Woodrow Wilson.

In 1936, after leaving his post as warden of San Quentin State Prison, he was drafted by supporters to run for State Senate again. That year, he defeated incumbent Bert B. Snyder and served for a second term. After serving the term, he retired once more in 1941.

== Career as US Marshall, Sheriff and Prison Warden ==
On April 23, 1918, Holohan was on duty as a US Marshall in a San Francisco courtroom at the end of a lengthy trial of thirty-two persons charged with conspiracy to foment revolution in India (part of what was known as the Hindu-German conspiracy). As the jury was sent out to consider its verdict, Ram Singh and Ram Chandra (two codefendants in the trial) rose to their feet. Singh raised a revolver and fired three shots at Chandra, fatally wounding him. Holohan, who was on the other side of the courtroom, pulled his revolver and fired a single shot over the heads of the attorneys, killing Singh instantly.

In 1924, Holohan retired as a US Marshal and was appointed as Sheriff of Santa Cruz County a year later, winning a full term in 1926. On September 1, 1927, Governor C. C. Young appointed Holohan as the warden of the San Quentin State Prison, later being re-appointed by James Rolph. As warden, he oversaw 50 executions during his tenure and later led California to adopt the gas chamber as a method of execution, replacing the gallows, while a State Senator.

In 1935, four convicts broke into Holohan's home where a meeting was taking place, beating up Holohan and taking four of the board members hostage. That same year, he resigned due to ill health and the injuries sustained in the incident. He was gifted a scroll signed by more than 5,000 prisoners wishing him well.

== Personal life ==
Holohan married Adeline V. Fraiser in 1902, with the two having a daughter, Josephine Frasier Holohan, on August 17, 1903. He died at his home in Watsonville on January 31, 1947.
