= California's 46th district =

California's 46th district may refer to:

- California's 46th congressional district
- California's 46th State Assembly district
