= Franklin Heck =

American politician

Member of the California State Assembly from the 56th district
- In office January 3, 1921 - January 8, 1923
- Preceded by: Grace S. Dorris
- Succeeded by: Grace S. Dorris

Personal details
- Party: Democratic

Military service
- Branch/service: United States Army
- Battles/wars: World War I

Franklin Heck served in the California State Assembly for the 56th district from 1921 to 1923 and during World War I he served in the United States Army.
