= Bob Epple =

American attorney and politician

Member of the California State Assembly from the 63rd district
- In office November 30, 1988 – November 30, 1994
- Preceded by: Wayne Grisham
- Succeeded by: Phil Hawkins

Personal details
- Born: November 18, 1948 Los Angeles, California
- Died: April 13, 2011 (aged 62) Norwalk, California
- Party: Democratic
- Spouse(s): Cheryl (m. 1972; died 2005) Colleen (m. 2010)
- Children: 1

Military service
- Branch/service: United States Army

Robert "Bob" Epple (November 18, 1948 – April 13, 2011) was an American attorney and politician from California and a member of the Democratic Party.

Epple first ran for elective office in 1980, when he challenged entrenched GOP state senator Bill Campbell in what was then a safe Republican district.

He then served as an elected member of the Cerritos College Board of Trustees from 1981 until 1988, when he ran for the California State Assembly.

Epple challenged incumbent assemblyman Wayne Grisham (R-La Mirada) in the 1988 election. Democrats considered Grisham vulnerable after he lost a special state senate election the year before against then Norwalk councilman Cecil Green within roughly the same geographic area. With help from Sacramento Democrats and Speaker Willie Brown, Epple narrowly defeated Grisham.

Reelected easily in 1990, Epple had a much tougher time in 1992, when he opted to run in the newly drawn 56th Assembly District, based around Cerritos, Bellflower, Downey and part of Long Beach. Although he represented a portion of the new district before reapportionment, he had to move there to seek reelection, mainly to open up a his old Norwalk-based 63rd district (which had been redrawn as a majority-Latino district) for a Latino candidate. He faced conservative businessman Phil Hawkins, in what became one of the most expensive California legislative races that year. Epple managed to only barely beat Hawkins by 542 votes. When they faced off in a rematch two years later, Hawkins beat Epple by more than 10 points in a strong year for Republicans nationally.

In 2004 Epple's wife Cheryl, then an elected member of the Cerritos College Board of Trustees, died suddenly of a heart attack. He replaced her on the board and was reelected in 2005 and 2010.

On April 13, 2011 Epple died after a long battle with leukemia.

== Electoral history ==
Member, California State Assembly: 1988-1994
Year	Office	Democrat	Votes	Pct	Republican	Votes	Pct
1980	California State Senate; District 33	Bob Epple	49,823	27.1%	Bill Campbell	133,740	72.9%
1988	California State Assembly; District 63	Bob Epple	48,611	50.1%	Wayne Grisham	48,391	49.9%
1990	California State Assembly; District 63	Bob Epple	36,728	59.6%	Diane Boggs	24,888	40.4%
1992	California State Assembly; District 56	Bob Epple	61,330	47.8%	Phil Hawkins	60,788	47.4%
1994	California State Assembly; District 56	Bob Epple	43,178	43.2%	Phil Hawkins	53,535	53.5%

Political offices
Preceded by Wayne Grisham	California State Assembly 63rd District; 1988 – 1992	Succeeded by Jim Brulte (redistricted)
Preceded by Lucille Roybal-Allard (redistricted)	California State Assembly 56th District; 1992 – 1994	Succeeded by Phil Hawkins
