= Grace S. Dorris =

American politician

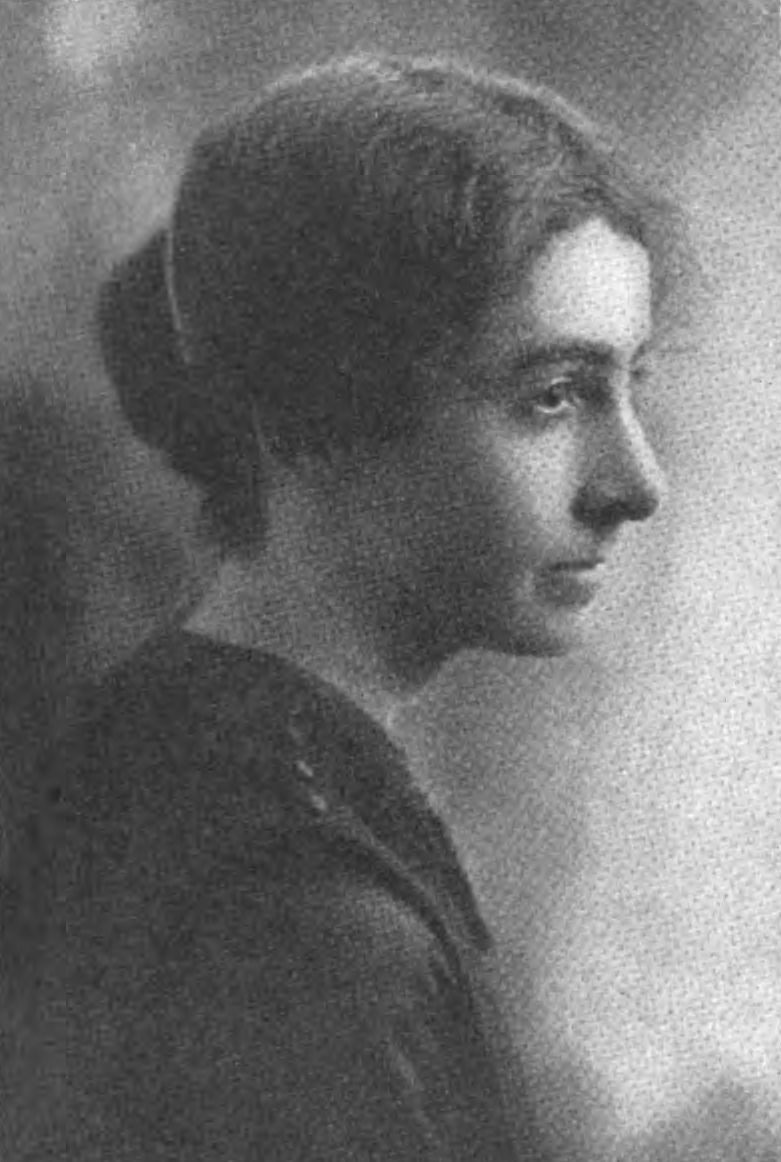

Member of the California State Assembly from the 56th district
- In office January 6, 1919 – January 3, 1921
- Preceded by: Witten William Harris
- Succeeded by: Franklin Heck
- In office January 8, 1923 – January 3, 1927
- Preceded by: Franklin Heck
- Succeeded by: Robert Lincoln Patterson

Personal details
- Born: Grace Storey McMillan; March 14, 1887 Ventura, California, U.S.
- Died: December 29, 1968 (aged 81) Bakersfield, California, U.S.
- Party: Republican
- Spouse: Wiley Casey Dorris (m. 1913; died 1957)
- Education: University of California, Berkeley

Grace Storey Dorris (née McMillan, formerly Green; March 14, 1887 – December 29, 1968) was an American politician who served in the California State Assembly for the 56th district from 1919 until 1921 and from 1923 until 1927. A member of the Republican Party, she was one of the first four women to be elected to the California State Legislature, alongside Esto Bates Broughton, Anna L. Saylor, and Elizabeth Hughes.

While in the California State Assembly, Dorris championed numerous social reforms, including introducing the state's first bill authored by a woman. She advocated for justice reform, proposing the provision of public defenders alongside prosecutors, supported water rights for farmers in her district, and pushed for stricter child labor protections. After losing renomination to Democrat Franklin Heck in 1920, she regained her seat in 1922 and 1924 before ultimately losing renomination to Robert Lincoln Patterson.

== Early life and education ==
Grace Storey McMillan was born on March 14, 1887, in Ventura, California. After her biological mother, Abbie Woode from New Hampshire, died when Grace was one year old, she was adopted by her aunt, Jennie Green. Her father, John McMillan, was a Scottish immigrant and a minister for the Methodist Episcopal Church. McMillan attended schools in Santa Barbara and graduated from University of California, Berkeley, in 1909. She became a teacher and an active participant in the women’s suffrage movement. Following her graduation, she pursued postgraduate studies and began teaching at Kern County Union High School in 1910.

== Political career ==
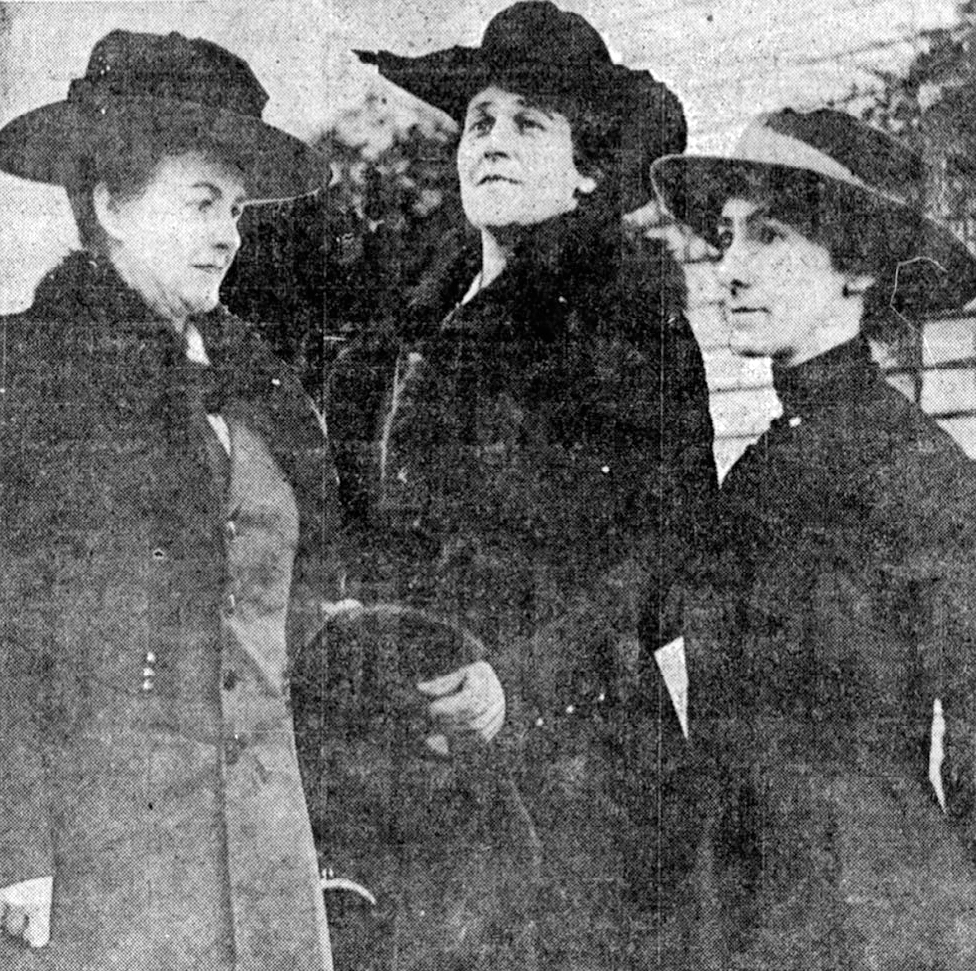
Dorris (right) with Anna L. Saylor and Elizabeth Hughes, 1919.

In 1918, Dorris's husband, Wiley C. Dorris, had planned to run for the California State Assembly in that year's election but was called to serve in the military during World War I. In his absence, Dorris decided to run in his place. She was endorsed by proponents of Prohibition and won the Republican nomination, pledging to support a nationwide amendment to ban alcohol. She went unopposed in the general election, becoming one of four women elected to the California State Assembly. Dorris authored the first bill introduced by a woman in the California State Assembly, proposing a 10-hour workday limit for domestic servants.

During her tenure in the State Assembly, Dorris introduced 21 bills but was not assigned to any standing committees, despite the Republican majority. Only four of her proposed bills reached the governor's desk. Dorris took the lead on federal suffrage efforts, introducing a joint resolution calling for a "memorial to Congress" to support the passage of the 19th Amendment.

In 1920, Dorris ran for re-election but was defeated in the Republican primary by Democrat Franklin Heck due to cross-filing, and did not appear on the general election ballot. Despite this, she garnered nearly 36% of the vote as a write-in candidate in the general election, making her one of the earliest known write-in candidates for the California State Assembly to appear on the ballot. She would be re-elected in 1922 and 1924, before she was defeated for renomination by Robert Lincoln Patterson.

== Personal life ==
Dorris married Wiley Casey Dorris on August 13, 1913, and she assisted in his law office before going into politics as well as after her term ended. She was a member of the El Tejon Parlor 239, Native Daughters of the Golden West, the Women's Auxiliary of the American Legion, and the Civic Commercial Association. Wiley Dorris was killed on December 23, 1957, in a train-car collision. Dorris died on December 29, 1968. The couple had no children.

== Electoral history ==
Electoral history of Jackie Goldberg
Year	Office		Party	Primary			General			Result	Swing	Ref.
Year	Office		Party	Total	%	P.	Total	%	P.	Result	Swing	Ref.
1918	California State Assembly	56th	Republican	[data missing]			8,214	100.00%	1st	Won	Hold	
1920	California State Assembly	56th	Republican	[data missing]			4,465	35.71%	2nd	Lost	Gain	
1922	California State Assembly	56th	Republican	[data missing]			12,669	100.00%	1st	Won	Gain	
1924	California State Assembly	56th	Republican	[data missing]			11,455	100.00%	1st	Won	Hold	
