= California's 56th State Assembly district =

American legislative district

Current assemblymember
| Lisa Calderon; D–Whittier |
- Population (2010) • Voting age • Citizen voting age: 465,302; 328,306; 227,204
- Demographics: 21.92% White; 3.14% Black; 71.80% Latino; 1.92% Asian; 0.79% Native American; 0.09% Hawaiian/Pacific Islander; 0.17% other; 0.18% remainder of multiracial
- Registered voters: 180,376
- Registration: 48.00% Democratic; 25.29% Republican; 22.52% No party preference

California's 56th State Assembly district is one of 80 California State Assembly districts. It is currently represented by Democrat Lisa Calderon of Whittier.

== District profile ==
The district encompasses portions of southeastern Los Angeles County and the San Gabriel Valley. The district is primarily suburban, socioeconomically diverse and majority Latino with a growing Asian population.

Los Angeles County

- Diamond Bar
- Hacienda Heights
- Industry
- La Habra Heights
- La Puente
- Pico Rivera
- Rowland Heights
- South El Monte (partial)
- Walnut
- Whittier
- West Whitter-Los Nietos

== Election results from statewide races ==
| Year | Office | Results |
|---|---|---|
| 2020 | President | Biden 62.2 – 35.9% |
| 2018 | Governor | Newsom 61.5 – 38.5% |
| 2018 | Senator | de Leon 53.8 – 46.2% |
| 2016 | President | Clinton 64.2 – 31.2% |
| 2016 | Senator | Sanchez 59.2 – 40.8% |
| 2014 | Governor | Brown 62.9 – 37.1% |
| 2012 | President | Obama 62.1 – 36.3% |
| 2012 | Senator | Feinstein 64.0 – 36.0% |

== List of assembly members representing the district ==
Due to redistricting, the 56th district has been moved around different parts of the state. The current iteration resulted from the 2021 redistricting by the California Citizens Redistricting Commission.

| Member | Party | Years served | Electoral history | Counties represented |
|---|---|---|---|---|
| George W. Watson (Oakland) | Republican | January 5, 1885 – January 3, 1887 | Elected in 1884. [data missing] | Alameda |
| Charles O. Alexander (Oakland) | Republican | January 3, 1887 – January 5, 1891 | Elected in 1886. Re-elected in 1888. [data missing] | Alameda |
| Almon Ames (Berkeley) | Republican | January 5, 1891 – January 2, 1893 | Elected in 1890. [data missing] | Alameda |
| Massey Thomas (Gilroy) | Democratic | January 2, 1893 – January 7, 1895 | Elected in 1892. [data missing] | Santa Clara |
| Walter A. Meads (San Jose) | Democratic | January 7, 1895 – January 4, 1897 | Elected in 1894. [data missing] | Santa Clara |
| M. E. Arnerich (San Jose) | Republican | January 4, 1897 – January 1, 1901 | Elected in 1896. Re-elected in 1898. [data missing] | Santa Clara |
| George S. Walker (San Jose) | Republican | January 1, 1901 – January 5, 1903 | Elected in 1900. Redistricted to the 55th district. | Santa Clara |
| Eli Wright (San Jose) | Republican | January 5, 1903 – January 2, 1905 | Elected in 1902. Retired to run for California State Senate. | Santa Clara |
| Ward Jarvis (Santa Clara) | Republican | January 2, 1905 – January 7, 1907 | Elected in 1904. [data missing] | Santa Clara |
| Guy W. Smith (San Jose) | Republican | January 7, 1907 – January 4, 1909 | Elected in 1906. [data missing] | Santa Clara |
| L. D. Bohnett (San Jose) | Republican | January 4, 1909 – January 6, 1913 | Elected in 1908. Re-elected in 1910. Re-elected in 1912. Retired to run for U.S. House of Representatives. | Santa Clara |
| William E. Simpson (Bakersfield) | Democratic | January 6, 1913 – January 4, 1915 | Elected in 1912. [data missing] | Kern |
| Witten W. Harris (Bakersfield) | Nonpartisan | January 4, 1915 – November 4, 1916 | Elected in 1915 as a Socialist but expelled by party. Re-elected as a Democrat in 1916. Retired to run for U.S. House of Representatives. | Kern |
| Witten W. Harris (Bakersfield) | Democratic | November 4, 1916 – January 6, 1919 | Elected in 1915 as a Socialist but expelled by party. Re-elected as a Democrat in 1916. Retired to run for U.S. House of Representatives. | Kern |
| Grace S. Dorris (Bakersfield) | Republican | January 6, 1919 – January 3, 1921 | Elected in 1918. Lost renomination. | Kern |
| Franklin Heck (Bakersfield) | Democratic | January 3, 1921 – January 8, 1923 | Elected in 1920. [data missing] | Kern |
| Grace S. Dorris (Bakersfield) | Republican | January 8, 1923 – January 3, 1927 | Elected in 1922. Re-elected in 1924. Lost renomination. | Kern |
| Robert L. Patterson (Bakersfield) | Republican | January 3, 1927 – January 5, 1931 | Elected in 1926. Re-elected in 1928. Redistricted to the 48th district and lost re-election. | Kern |
| Walter J. Little (Los Angeles) | Republican | January 5, 1931 – January 2, 1933 | Redistricted from the 62nd district and re-elected in 1930. Redistricted to the 60th district. | Los Angeles |
| Bert V. Callahan (Los Angeles) | Democratic | January 2, 1933 – January 7, 1935 | Elected in 1932. [data missing] | Los Angeles |
| Thomas J. Cunningham (Los Angeles) | Republican | January 7, 1935 – January 2, 1939 | Elected in 1934. Re-elected in 1936. [data missing] | Los Angeles |
| Norris Poulson (Los Angeles) | Republican | January 2, 1939 – January 3, 1943 | Elected in 1938. Re-elected in 1940. Retired to run for U.S. House of Representatives. | Los Angeles |
| Ernest E. Debs (Los Angeles) | Democratic | January 4, 1943 – June 30, 1947 | Elected in 1942. Re-elected in 1944. Re-elected in 1946. Resigned after election to the Los Angeles City Council. | Los Angeles |
| Vacant | | June 30, 1947 – November 25, 1947 | | Los Angeles |
| Glenard P. Lipscomb (Los Angeles) | Republican | November 25, 1947 – November 10, 1953 | Elected to finish Debs's term. Re-elected in 1948. Re-elected in 1950. Re-elected in 1952. Resigned after election to the U.S. House of Representatives. | Los Angeles |
| Vacant | | November 10, 1953 – January 3, 1955 | | Los Angeles |
| Seth J. Johnson (Los Angeles) | Republican | January 3, 1955 – July 16, 1959 | Elected in 1954. Re-elected in 1956. Re-elected in 1958. Died. | Los Angeles |
| Vacant | | July 16, 1959 – December 2, 1959 | | Los Angeles |
| Chet Wolfrum (Los Angeles) | Republican | December 2, 1959 – January 7, 1963 | Elected to finish Johnson's term. Re-elected in 1960. Lost re-election. | Los Angeles |
| Charles Warren (Los Angeles) | Democratic | January 7, 1963 – November 30, 1974 | Elected in 1962. Re-elected in 1964. Re-elected in 1966. Re-elected in 1968. Re-elected in 1970. Re-elected in 1972. Redistricted to the 46th district. | Los Angeles |
| Art Torres (Los Angeles) | Democratic | December 2, 1974 – November 30, 1982 | Elected in 1974. Re-elected in 1976. Re-elected in 1978. Re-elected in 1980. Retired to run for California State Senate. | Los Angeles |
| Gloria Molina (Los Angeles) | Democratic | December 6, 1982 – February 27, 1987 | Elected in 1982. Re-elected in 1984. Re-elected in 1986. Resigned after election to the Los Angeles City Council. | Los Angeles |
| Vacant | | February 27, 1987 – May 18, 1987 | | Los Angeles |
| Lucille Roybal-Allard (Los Angeles) | Democratic | May 18, 1987 – November 30, 1992 | Elected to finish Molina's term. Re-elected in 1988. Re-elected in 1990. Retired to run for U.S. House of Representatives. | Los Angeles |
| Bob Epple (Cerritos) | Democratic | December 7, 1992 – November 30, 1994 | Redistricted from the 63rd district and re-elected in 1992. Lost re-election. | Los Angeles |
| Phillip D. Hawkins (Bellflower) | Republican | December 5, 1994 – November 30, 1996 | Elected in 1994. Lost re-election. | Los Angeles |
| Sally M. Havice (Los Angeles) | Democratic | December 2, 1996 – November 30, 2002 | Elected in 1996. Re-elected in 1998. Re-elected in 2000. Termed out; unsuccessfully ran for the U.S. House of Representatives. | Los Angeles |
| Rudy Bermudez (Norwalk) | Democratic | December 2, 2002 – November 30, 2006 | Elected in 2002. Re-elected in 2004. Retired to run for California State Senate. | Los Angeles, Orange |
| Tony Mendoza (Artesia) | Democratic | December 4, 2006 – November 30, 2012 | Elected in 2006. Re-elected in 2008. Re-elected in 2010. Termed out | Los Angeles, Orange |
| V. Manuel Perez (Coachella) | Democratic | December 3, 2012 – November 30, 2014 | Redistricted from the 80th district and Re-elected in 2012. Term-limited and ran for Riverside Board of Supervisors. | Imperial, Riverside |
| Eduardo Garcia (Coachella) | Democratic | December 1, 2014 – November 30, 2022 | Re-elected in 2014. Re-elected in 2016. Re-elected in 2018. Re-elected in 2020. Redistricted to the 36th district. | Imperial, Riverside |
| Lisa Calderon (Whittier) | Democratic | December 5, 2022 – present | Redistricted from the 57th district and Re-elected in 2022. Re-elected in 2024. | Los Angeles |

== Election results (1990-present) ==
=== 2024 ===
2024 California State Assembly 56th district election
Primary election
| Party | Candidate | Votes | % |
|---|---|---|---|
| Democratic | Lisa Calderon (incumbent) | 38,003 | 56.4 |
| Republican | Jessica Martinez | 21,678 | 32.1 |
| Republican | Natasha Serrano | 7,751 | 11.5 |
| Total votes | | 67,432 | 100.0 |
General election
| Democratic | Lisa Calderon (incumbent) | 94,470 | 56.7 |
| Republican | Jessica Martinez | 72,198 | 43.3 |
| Total votes | | 166,668 | 100.0 |
| Democratic hold | | | |

=== 2022 ===
2022 California State Assembly 56th district election
Primary election
| Party | Candidate | Votes | % |
|---|---|---|---|
| Democratic | Lisa Calderon (incumbent) | 35,943 | 59.7 |
| Republican | Jessica Martinez | 17,845 | 29.6 |
| Republican | Natasha Serrano | 6,466 | 10.7 |
| Total votes | | 60,254 | 100.0 |
General election
| Democratic | Lisa Calderon (incumbent) | 62,079 | 58.5 |
| Republican | Jessica Martinez | 44,105 | 41.5 |
| Total votes | | 106,184 | 100.0 |
| Democratic hold | | | |

=== 2020 ===
2020 California State Assembly 56th district election
Primary election
| Party | Candidate | Votes | % |
|---|---|---|---|
| Democratic | Eduardo Garcia (incumbent) | 44,530 | 64.0 |
| Republican | America Figueroa | 25,074 | 36.0 |
| Total votes | | 69,604 | 100.0 |
General election
| Democratic | Eduardo Garcia (incumbent) | 97,497 | 63.6 |
| Republican | America Figueroa | 55,702 | 36.4 |
| Total votes | | 153,196 | 100.0 |
| Democratic hold | | | |

=== 2018 ===
2018 California State Assembly 56th district election
Primary election
| Party | Candidate | Votes | % |
|---|---|---|---|
| Democratic | Eduardo Garcia (incumbent) | 31,747 | 60.3 |
| Republican | Jeff Gonzalez | 13,331 | 25.3 |
| Republican | Jonathan Reiss | 7,527 | 14.3 |
| Total votes | | 52,605 | 100.0 |
General election
| Democratic | Eduardo Garcia (incumbent) | 62,622 | 64.8 |
| Republican | Jeff Gonzalez | 34,088 | 35.2 |
| Total votes | | 96,710 | 100.0 |
| Democratic hold | | | |

=== 2016 ===
2016 California State Assembly 56th district election
Primary election
| Party | Candidate | Votes | % |
|---|---|---|---|
| Democratic | Eduardo Garcia (incumbent) | 45,122 | 100.0 |
| Total votes | | 45,122 | 100.0 |
General election
| Democratic | Eduardo Garcia (incumbent) | 93,090 | 100.0 |
| Total votes | | 93,090 | 100.0 |
| Democratic hold | | | |

=== 2014 ===
2014 California State Assembly 56th district election
Primary election
| Party | Candidate | Votes | % |
|---|---|---|---|
| Democratic | Eduardo Garcia | 23,104 | 56.9 |
| Republican | Charles Bennet, Jr. | 17,471 | 43.1 |
| Total votes | | 40,575 | 100.0 |
General election
| Democratic | Eduardo Garcia | 35,671 | 58.5 |
| Republican | Charles Bennet, Jr. | 25,347 | 41.5 |
| Total votes | | 61,018 | 100.0 |
| Democratic hold | | | |

=== 2012 ===
2012 California State Assembly 56th district election
Primary election
| Party | Candidate | Votes | % |
|---|---|---|---|
| Democratic | V. Manuel Perez (incumbent) | 23,661 | 57.1 |
| Republican | Corky Reynaga-Emett | 17,763 | 42.9 |
| Total votes | | 41,424 | 100.0 |
General election
| Democratic | V. Manuel Perez (incumbent) | 66,353 | 66.1 |
| Republican | Corky Reynaga-Emett | 34,038 | 33.9 |
| Total votes | | 100,391 | 100.0 |
| Democratic hold | | | |

=== 2010 ===
2010 California State Assembly 56th district election
| Party | Candidate | Votes | % |
|---|---|---|---|
| Democratic | Tony Mendoza (incumbent) | 56,943 | 65.5 |
| Republican | Henry J. Bestwick | 30,111 | 34.5 |
| Total votes | | 87,054 | 100.0 |
| Democratic hold | | | |

=== 2008 ===
2008 California State Assembly 56th district election
| Party | Candidate | Votes | % |
|---|---|---|---|
| Democratic | Tony Mendoza (incumbent) | 78,652 | 65.2 |
| Republican | Roger Garrett | 42,040 | 34.8 |
| Total votes | | 120,692 | 100.0 |
| Democratic hold | | | |

=== 2006 ===
2006 California State Assembly 56th district election
| Party | Candidate | Votes | % |
|---|---|---|---|
| Democratic | Tony Mendoza | 43,666 | 57.7 |
| Republican | Grace Hu | 31,991 | 42.3 |
| Total votes | | 75,657 | 100.0 |
| Democratic hold | | | |

=== 2004 ===
2004 California State Assembly 56th district election
| Party | Candidate | Votes | % |
|---|---|---|---|
| Democratic | Rudy Bermudez (incumbent) | 67,294 | 60.2 |
| Republican | John Brantuk | 44,559 | 39.8 |
| Total votes | | 111,853 | 100.0 |
| Democratic hold | | | |

=== 2002 ===
2002 California State Assembly 56th district election
| Party | Candidate | Votes | % |
|---|---|---|---|
| Democratic | Rudy Bermudez | 39,519 | 61.5 |
| Republican | John Brantuk | 24,751 | 38.5 |
| Total votes | | 64,270 | 100.0 |
| Democratic hold | | | |

=== 2000 ===
2000 California State Assembly 56th district election
| Party | Candidate | Votes | % |
|---|---|---|---|
| Democratic | Sally Havice (incumbent) | 73,536 | 60.6 |
| Republican | Grace Hu | 47,836 | 39.4 |
| Total votes | | 121,372 | 100.0 |
| Democratic hold | | | |

=== 1998 ===
1998 California State Assembly 56th district election
| Party | Candidate | Votes | % |
|---|---|---|---|
| Democratic | Sally Havice (incumbent) | 48,913 | 53.0 |
| Republican | Phil Hawkins | 40,972 | 44.4 |
| Libertarian | Bruce J. McKenzie | 2,409 | 2.6 |
| Total votes | | 92,294 | 100.0 |
| Democratic hold | | | |

=== 1996 ===
1996 California State Assembly 56th district election
| Party | Candidate | Votes | % |
|---|---|---|---|
| Democratic | Sally M. Havice | 54,455 | 49.4 |
| Republican | Richard Lambros | 52,376 | 47.5 |
| Libertarian | Arthur M. Hays | 3,478 | 3.2 |
| Total votes | | 110,309 | 100.0 |
| Democratic gain from Republican | | | |

=== 1994 ===
1994 California State Assembly 56th district election
| Party | Candidate | Votes | % |
|---|---|---|---|
| Republican | Phil Hawkins | 53,535 | 53.5 |
| Democratic | Bob Epple (incumbent) | 43,178 | 43.2 |
| Libertarian | Arthur M. Hays | 3,308 | 3.3 |
| Total votes | | 100,021 | 100.0 |
| Republican gain from Democratic | | | |

=== 1992 ===
1992 California State Assembly 56th district election
| Party | Candidate | Votes | % |
|---|---|---|---|
| Democratic | Bob Epple (incumbent) | 61,330 | 47.8 |
| Republican | Phil Hawkins | 60,788 | 47.4 |
| Libertarian | Richard Gard | 6,151 | 4.8 |
| Total votes | | 128,269 | 100.0 |
| Democratic hold | | | |

=== 1990 ===
1990 California State Assembly 56th district election
| Party | Candidate | Votes | % |
|---|---|---|---|
| Democratic | Lucille Roybal-Allard (incumbent) | 15,761 | 100.0 |
| Total votes | | 15,761 | 100.0 |
| Democratic hold | | | |

== See also ==
- California State Assembly
- California State Assembly districts
- Districts in California
