= Thomas A. Maloney =

American politician

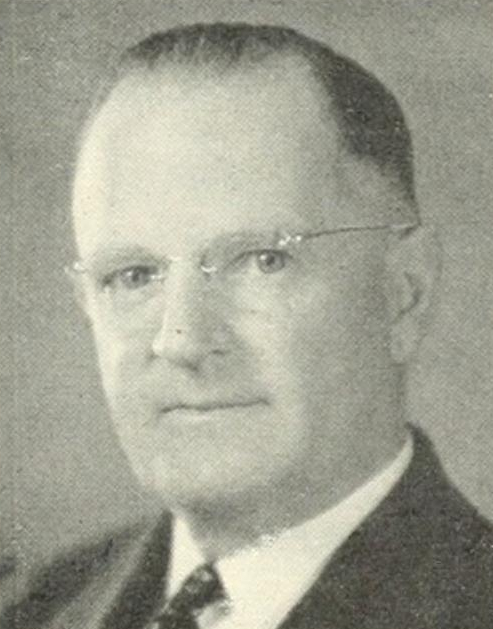
- Official portrait, 1950

Member of the California State Assembly from the 20th district
- In office January 2, 1933 – January 7, 1957
- Preceded by: Theodore McKay Wright
- Succeeded by: Phillip Burton

Member of the California Senate from the 23rd district
- In office January 5, 1925 – January 2, 1933
- Preceded by: Walter A. McDonald
- Succeeded by: Bert B. Snyder

Personal details
- Born: Thomas Aloysius Maloney; May 22, 1889 San Francisco, California, U.S.
- Died: January 15, 1986 (aged 96) Belmont, California, U.S.
- Party: Republican
- Spouse: Helen Margaret Toomey
- Children: 4

Thomas Aloysius Maloney (May 22, 1889 – January 15, 1986) was an American politician who was first elected to the California State Senate in 1924. He was reelected in 1927. In 1932 the Federal government instituted the Federal Reapportionment plan. When this happened Senator Maloney decided to run for State Assembly instead of the State Senate. He was elected to represent the 23rd assembly district. He rose to become speaker pro tem in 1943 and kept the job through four speakers. He held this position until 1956 when he lost the race for reelection. During his time in the Senate and the Assembly, Senator Maloney was elected as Speaker Pro Tempore of the Assembly and appointed to committees handling Constitutional Amendments, Finance and Insurance issues, and Government Organization issues. He gained a reputation for supporting labor, industry and business.

== Family ==
Senator Maloney was the eldest of eighteen children. He was born in 1889 to John Maloney and Julia (Smith) Maloney. The first nine children including Tom were birthed by Julia, who died when was Tom was still very young. After her death John Maloney quickly remarried and nine more children were added to the family by Tom's stepmother. With so many mouths to feed, money didn't go very far. To make matters worse only a few weeks after Julia's death John was injured while working as a stevedore on the dock. This left him unable to work as much as he used to. Tom as the oldest went to work at the age of six selling news papers down on the dock. Tom would buy the papers for a nickel and sell them to the dock men for a dime. He would sell these papers all along the dock both before and after school each day. At age eleven Tom began work on the dock scaling boilers on steamships. As a twelve-year-old, Tommy worked helping to run his father's saloon, the Cuckoo's Nest at First and Brannan in San Francisco. The Cuckoo's Nest was reputed to be a popular establishment for police and firefighters. Later he worked as a stevedore and after that in a lumber yard. In 1911 Tom married Ellen Twomey, and they had four children: Tom, Jack, Alice, and Barbara.

== Senate career ==
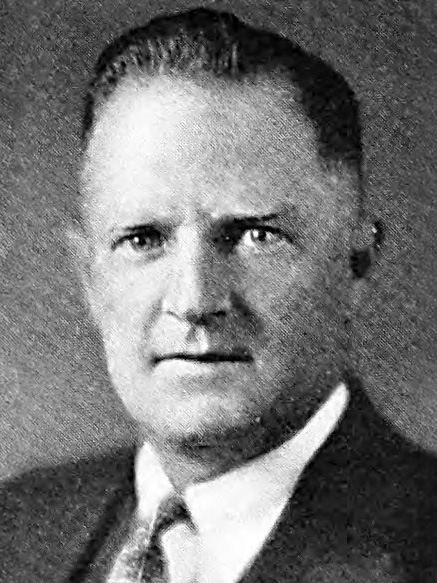
Maloney in 1932 during his California State Senate tenure.

State Senator Tommy Maloney, known as the son of a saloon keeper from Kildare, County in Ireland, was raised on the rough streets South of Market, in San Francisco; he served as a great friend of labor yet with only a sixth grade education. Senator Maloney was elected in 1924 to the Senate, served two terms, then his senate district was abolished and he became an assemblyman; he was known in the Senate to be a very fine man.

== Assembly career ==
Known as the Unbeatable Tommy Maloney at the end of his career, he had been Speaker Pro Tem of the California Assembly and a thirty-two year veteran of Sacramento. He was also known as an icon of the San Francisco Irish Community. Maloney was not known to be like those Assemblymen from San Francisco who did little work. The state's most important laws on worker compensation, payments for the sick and disabled, benefits for the aged, the blind, and housing for veterans were among bills he wrote or championed. Known as a liberal Republican, called by some the liberal dean of the California legislature, he garnered more than 100 union endorsements for his final election—at age sixty-eight—he fell in the 1956 campaign for the Assembly seat in the 70th Democratic District.
