= Wayne R. Grisham =

American politician

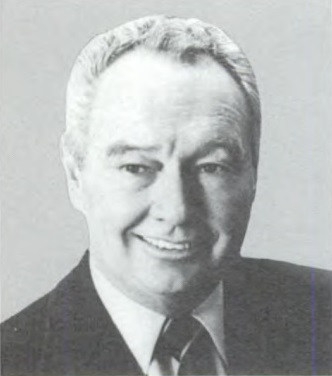

Member of the California State Assembly from the 63rd district
- In office December 3, 1984 – November 30, 1988
- Preceded by: Bruce E. Young
- Succeeded by: Bob Epple

Member of the U.S. House of Representatives from California's 33rd district
- In office January 3, 1979 – January 3, 1983
- Preceded by: Del M. Clawson
- Succeeded by: David Dreier

Member of La Mirada City Council
- In office 1970 - 1978

Mayor of La Mirada, California
- In office 1973 - 1974
- In office 1977 - 1978

Personal details
- Born: Wayne Richard Grisham; January 10, 1923 Lamar, Colorado, U.S.
- Died: January 19, 2011 (aged 88) La Mirada, California, U.S.
- Party: Republican
- Education: Long Beach City College (A.A.); Whittier College (B.A.); University of Southern California
- Occupation: teacher, businessman

Military service
- Branch/service: United States Army Air Forces
- Years of service: 1942-1946
- Battles/wars: World War II: European Theater

Wayne Richard Grisham (January 10, 1923 – January 19, 2011) was a two-term member of the United States House of Representatives from California from 1979 to 1983.

== Biography ==
Born in Lamar, Colorado, Grisham graduated from Jordan High School in Long Beach, California in 1940. He was a fighter pilot in the United States Army Air Forces stationed in the European theater of World War II from 1942 to 1946. During this time, his plane was shot down and he was a prisoner of war.

=== Education and early career ===
In 1947, he received an associate degree from Long Beach City College. In 1949, he earned a B.A. at Whittier College, in Whittier, California. He conducted graduate work at the University of Southern California in Los Angeles, California from 1950 to 1951. He was a teacher, a businessman, and he served as president of Wayne Grisham Realty from 1958 to 1978. He served as chairman of the board of directors of First Mutual Mortgage Co. from 1974 to 1978. He served as member of La Mirada City Council from 1970 to 1978. He then served as mayor of La Mirada from 1973 to 1974 and from 1977 to 1978. He served as a delegate to the California League of Cities and National League of Cities from 1970 to 1978.

=== Congress ===
A Republican, Grisham was elected to the United States House of Representative in 1978, succeeding retiring incumbent Del Clawson.

He served two terms but was an unsuccessful candidate for renomination in 1982, after redistricting combined his district with that of fellow Republican David Dreier.

=== Later career and death ===
He served as director of the Peace Corps in Nairobi, Kenya, 1983.

He was elected to the California State Assembly in 1984 and was reelected in 1986. In 1987, he ran for the California State Senate in a special election to succeed Democrat Paul B. Carpenter, who resigned to become a member of the California Board of Equalization, but was defeated by Democratic Norwalk city councilman Cecil Green. He was narrowly defeated for reelection to the state Assembly in 1988 by Democrat Bob Epple, then a member of the Cerritos College Board of Trustees.

He was a resident of La Mirada, California.

== Electoral history ==
1978 United States House of Representatives elections in California
Party	Candidate	Votes	%
Republican	Wayne R. Grisham	79,533	56.0
Democratic	Dennis S. Kazarian	62,540	44.0
Total votes		142,073	100.0
Republican hold			

1980 United States House of Representatives elections in California
Party	Candidate	Votes	%
Republican	Wayne R. Grisham (Incumbent)	122,439	70.9
Democratic	Fred L. Anderson	50,365	29.1
Total votes		172,804	100.0
Republican hold			
