= Bert B. Snyder =

American politician

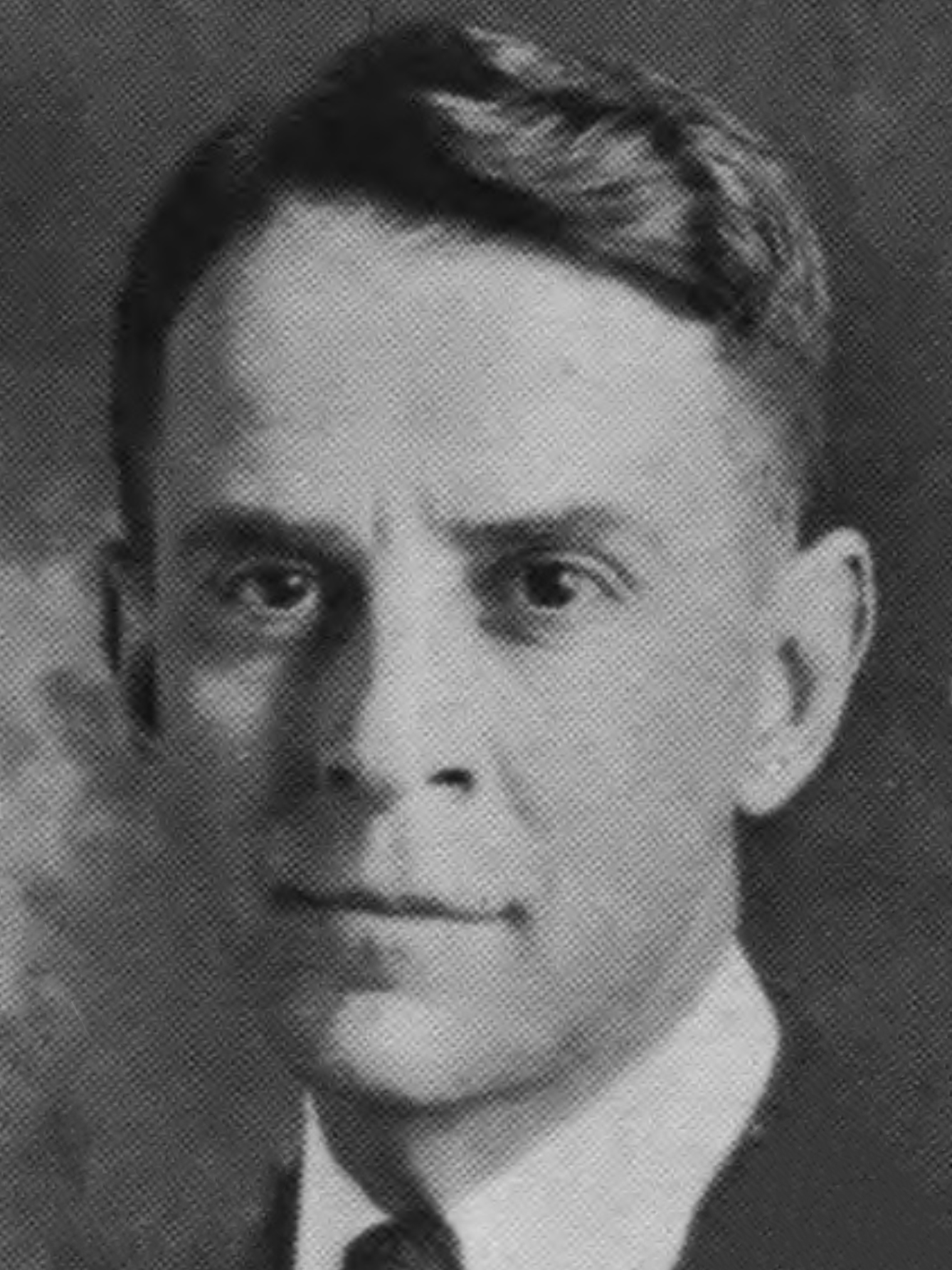
- Official portrait, 1924

Member of the California Senate from the 23rd district
- In office January 2, 1933 – January 4, 1937
- Preceded by: Thomas A. Maloney
- Succeeded by: James B. Holohan

Member of the California State Assembly from the 42nd district
- In office January 5, 1931 – January 2, 1933
- Preceded by: Harry L. Parkman
- Succeeded by: James S. O'Connor

Member of the California State Assembly from the 43rd district
- In office January 3, 1927 – January 5, 1931
- Preceded by: George C. Cleveland
- Succeeded by: Chris N. Jespersen

Member of the California State Assembly from the 7th district
- In office January 8, 1923 – January 5, 1925
- Preceded by: Elizabeth Hughes
- Succeeded by: Charles H. Deuel

Personal details
- Born: December 16, 1886 Santa Cruz, California
- Died: February 22, 1955 (aged 68)
- Party: Republican
- Spouse: Irene Barbara Wedekind (m. 1920)

Military service
- Branch/service: United States Army
- Battles/wars: World War I

Bert Bernard Snyder (December 16, 1886 – February 22, 1955) was an American politician who served in the California State Assembly for the 7th, 43rd, and 42nd district from 1923 to 1933. He served in the California State Senate for the 23rd district from 1933 to 1937. During World War I he also served in the United States Army.
