= Esto Bates Broughton =

American lawyer and politician

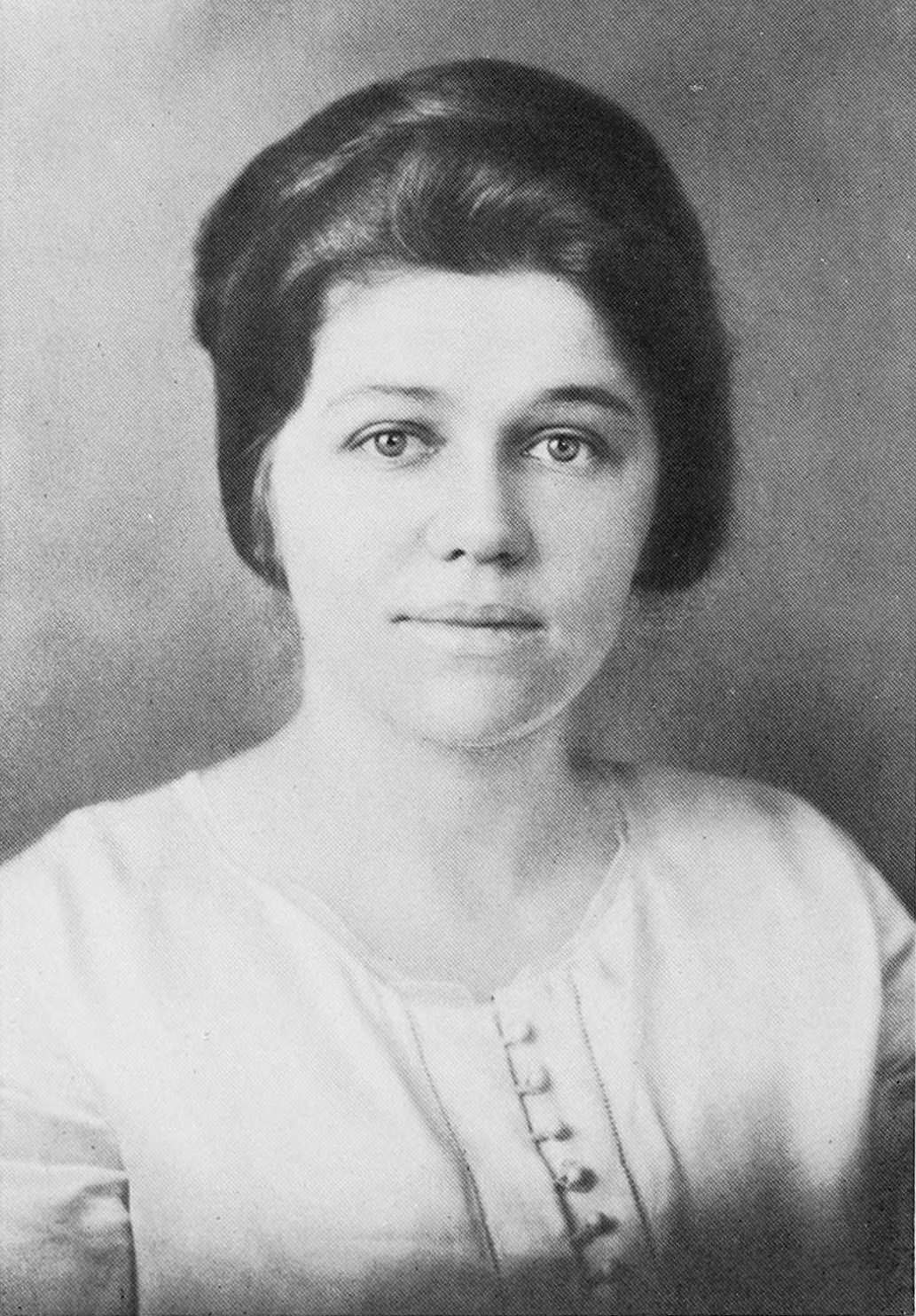

Member of the California State Assembly from the 46th district
- In office January 6, 1919 – January 3, 1927
- Preceded by: Lewis Lincoln Dennett
- Succeeded by: Vernon F. Gant

Personal details
- Born: January 9, 1890 Modesto, California
- Died: November 20, 1956 (aged 66) Modesto, California
- Party: Democratic
- Education: University of California, Berkeley
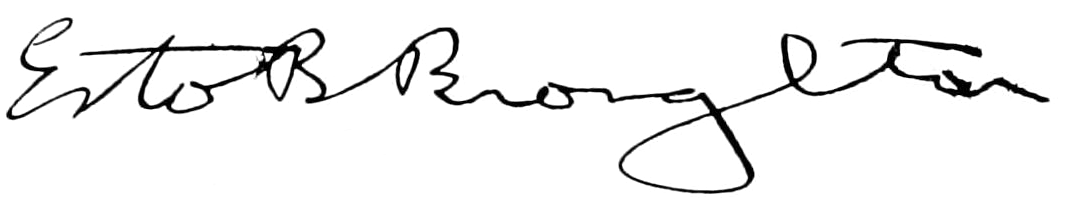
- Signature

Esto Bates Broughton (January 9, 1890 – November 20, 1956) was an American lawyer, journalist, publicist, and politician, one of the first four women to serve in the California State Assembly when they were elected in 1918. Broughton, who was sworn into office at age 29, was also the youngest woman ever to serve in the California legislature, until her record was broken in 2002.

== Early life ==
Esto Bates Broughton was born in Modesto, California, the daughter of James Richard Broughton and Jennie Bates Broughton. Her father was a bank president. She attended the University of California at Berkeley, completing undergraduate studies in 1915, and earning her law degree in the class of 1916.

== Career ==
Esto Bates Broughton was the first woman lawyer in Stanislaus County, California

In 1918 she was the only Democratic woman candidate elected to the California state assembly for the 46th district, and one of the first four women to be elected to the state's legislature, along with Grace S. Dorris, Elizabeth Hughes, and Anna L. Saylor. Broughton, representing Modesto, was reelected in 1920, 1922, and 1924. While in the legislature, she introduced bills on community property, agricultural irrigation, consumer protection, and jobs for World War I veterans. She objected to the exploitation of children in motion picture productions, but said she didn't mind "Theda Bara giving the girls lessons in vamping, although I think she carries it too far."

Broughton chaired the publicity department of the California Federation of Women's Clubs. In 1928, she addressed the Women's International League for Peace and Freedom meeting in Hawaii, at which Jane Addams was presiding. From 1928 to 1931, she was publicist for the Pasadena Playhouse. In 1931, she was working as a journalist, covering state politics for the Fresno Republican and other newspapers. In 1932 she was a delegate to the Democratic National Convention that nominated Franklin Delano Roosevelt for president. She started a weekly newspaper, Political Straws, in 1933.

In 1944, she ran for Congress, and was endorsed by the Merced County Democratic Central Committee. In the same year, she campaigned for Franklin Roosevelt's re-election.

== Personal life ==
Broughton died in Modesto in 1956, aged 66 years. Her nephew was San Francisco poet, filmmaker, and playwright James Broughton (1913-1999).

Esto Bates Broughton was 29 years old when she was sworn into office early in 1919. Nobody younger than that was sworn into the California Assembly until 2002, when Cindy Montañez took office at age 28.

== See also ==
- List of first women lawyers and judges in California
