= Robert Lincoln Patterson =

American politician from California

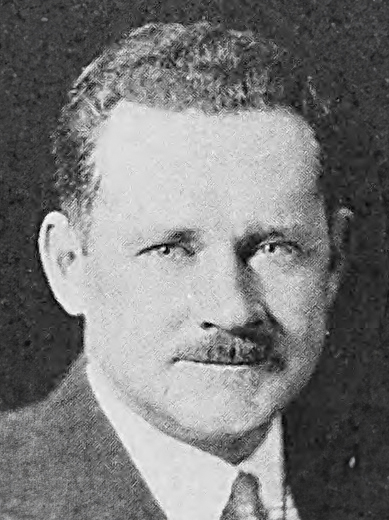

Member of the California State Assembly
- In office January 3, 1927 – January 2, 1933
- Preceded by: Grace S. Dorris
- Succeeded by: Frank G. Martin
- Constituency: 56th district (1927–1931); 48th district (1931–1933)

Personal details
- Born: August 1, 1887 San Francisco, California
- Died: April 2, 1940 (aged 52) Los Angeles, California
- Party: Republican
- Spouse: Mary Clark Jordan

Military service
- Branch/service: United States Army
- Battles/wars: World War I

Robert Lincoln Patterson (August 1, 1887 – April 2, 1940) was an American politician served in the California State Assembly for the 56th district from 1927 to 1931 and 48th district from 1931 to 1933 and during World War I he served in the United States Army.
