= Vernon F. Gant =

American politician

Member of the California State Assembly from the 46th district
- In office January 3, 1927 - January 7, 1929
- Preceded by: Esto Bates Broughton
- Succeeded by: Frank Baltzell Collier

Personal details
- Born: September 8, 1896 Franklin, Kentucky
- Died: January 15, 1959 (aged 62) Modesto, California
- Party: Republican

Military service
- Branch/service: United States Army
- Battles/wars: World War I

Vernon Franklin Gant (September 8, 1896 - January 15, 1959) served in the California State Assembly for the 46th district from 1927 to 1929 and during World War I he served in the United States Navy.
