= California's 46th State Assembly district =

American legislative district

Current assemblymember
Jesse Gabriel; D–Encino
- Population (2010) • Voting age • Citizen voting age: 464,441; 358,293; 247,706
- Demographics: 39.98% White; 4.69% Black; 44.39% Latino; 9.52% Asian; 0.32% Native American; 0.17% Hawaiian/Pacific Islander; 0.42% other; 0.51% remainder of multiracial
- Registered voters: 246,235
- Registration: 53.34% Democratic; 14.86% Republican; 26.94% No party preference

California's 46th State Assembly district is one of 80 California State Assembly districts. It is currently represented by Democrat Jesse Gabriel of North Hollywood.

== District profile ==
The district encompasses the central and southeastern San Fernando Valley. This ethnically diverse district is an important gateway between the valley and the rest of Los Angeles.

Los Angeles County – 4.7%

- Los Angeles – 12.2%
  - Hollywood Hills – partial
  - Lake Balboa
  - North Hills
  - North Hollywood – partial
  - Reseda
  - Sherman Oaks
  - Studio City
  - Toluca Lake
  - Valley Glen
  - Valley Village
  - Van Nuys
- Universal City

== Election results from statewide races ==
Year	Office	Results
2021	Recall	No 76.8 – 23.2%
2020	President	Biden 73.5 - 23.1%
2018	Governor	Newsom 78.0 – 22.0%
2018	Senator	Feinstein 60.2 – 39.8%
2016	President	Clinton 76.2 – 18.5%
2016	Senator	Harris 68.0 – 32.0%
2014	Governor	Brown 72.8 – 27.2%
2012	President	Obama 73.7 – 23.6%
2012	Senator	Feinstein 75.7 – 24.3%

== List of assembly members representing the district ==
Due to redistricting, the 46th district has been moved around different parts of the state. The current iteration resulted from the 2021 redistricting by the California Citizens Redistricting Commission.

Assembly members	Party	Years served	Counties represented	Notes
Thomas H. McDonald	Democratic	January 5, 1885 – January 3, 1887	San Francisco	
Hugh Toner	Democratic	January 3, 1887 – January 7, 1889	San Francisco	
James Reavey	Democratic	January 7, 1889 – January 5, 1891	San Francisco	
Lawrence Hoey	Democratic	January 5, 1891 – January 2, 1893	San Francisco	
Hugh J. O'Neill	Democratic	January 2, 1893 – January 7, 1895	Alameda	
F. R. Fassett	Republican	January 7, 1895 – January 4, 1897	Alameda	
James W. Clarke	Republican	January 4, 1897 – January 2, 1899	Alameda	
William McDonald	Republican	January 2, 1899 – January 1, 1901	Alameda	
John G. Mattos Jr.	Republican	January 1, 1901 – January 2, 1905	Alameda	
Edward Keating Strobridge	Republican	January 2, 1905 – January 4, 1909	Alameda	
Thomas H. Silver	Republican	January 4, 1909 – January 2, 1911	Alameda	
Antone Augustine Rogers	Republican	January 2, 1911 – January 6, 1913	Alameda	
David Whitlaw Tulloch	Democratic	January 6, 1913 – January 4, 1915	Stanislaus	
Lewis Lincoln Dennett	Progressive	January 4, 1915 – January 6, 1919	Stanislaus	
Lewis Lincoln Dennett	Republican	January 4, 1915 – January 6, 1919	Stanislaus	
Esto Bates Broughton	Democratic	January 6, 1919 – January 3, 1927	Stanislaus	First woman to be elected along with Grace S. Dorris, Elizabeth Hughes, and Anna L. Saylor.
Vernon F. Gant	Republican	January 3, 1927 – January 7, 1929	Stanislaus	
Frank Baltzell Collier	Republican	January 7, 1929 – January 5, 1931	Stanislaus	
Charles Todd Clark	Democratic	January 5, 1931 – January 2, 1933	Fresno	
Sam M. Greene	Republican	January 2, 1933 – January 7, 1935	Los Angeles	
Ralph W. Evans	Democratic	January 7, 1935 – January 4, 1937	Los Angeles	
Jack Tenney	Democratic	January 4, 1937 – January 4, 1943	Los Angeles	
Glenn M. Anderson	Democratic	January 4, 1943 – January 8, 1951	Los Angeles	
Charles Edward Chapel	Republican	January 8, 1951 – February 20, 1967	Los Angeles	Died in office from a heart attack.
Vacant		February 20, 1967 – May 16, 1967	Los Angeles	
Robert G. Beverly	Republican	May 16, 1967 – November 30, 1974	Los Angeles	Sworn in after winning special election.
Charles Warren	Democratic	December 2, 1974 – March 11, 1977	Los Angeles	Resigned from office.
Vacant		March 11, 1977 – June 24, 1977	Los Angeles	
Mike Roos	Democratic	June 24, 1977 – March 20, 1991	Los Angeles	Sworn in after winning special election. Resigned from office.
Vacant		March 20, 1991 – August 1, 1991	Los Angeles	
Barbara Friedman	Democratic	August 1, 1991 – November 30, 1992	Los Angeles	Sworn in after winning special election to fill the vacant seat left by Mike Roos.
Louis Caldera	Democratic	December 7, 1992 – September 2, 1997	Los Angeles	Resigned from office to become Managing Director & Chief Operating Officer for the Corporation for National and Community Service.
Vacant		September 2, 1997 – January 16, 1998	Los Angeles	
Gil Cedillo	Democratic	January 16, 1998 – November 30, 2002	Los Angeles	Sworn in after winning special election to replace Louis Caldera, accepted a federal government position.
Fabian Núñez	Democratic	December 2, 2002 – November 30, 2008	Los Angeles	
John Pérez	Democratic	December 1, 2008 – November 30, 2012	Los Angeles	
Adrin Nazarian	Democratic	December 3, 2012 – November 30, 2022	Los Angeles	
Jesse Gabriel	Democratic	December 5, 2022 – present	Los Angeles, Ventura	

== Election results (1990–present) ==
=== 2024 ===
2024 California State Assembly 46th district election
Primary election
Party	Candidate	Votes	%
Democratic	Jesse Gabriel (incumbent)	50,156	65.5
Republican	Tracey Schroeder	26,371	34.5
Total votes		76,527	100.0
General election
Democratic	Jesse Gabriel (incumbent)	107,003	62.9
Republican	Tracey Schroeder	63,114	37.1
Total votes		170,117	100.0
Democratic hold			

=== 2022 ===
2022 California State Assembly 46th district election
Primary election
Party	Candidate	Votes	%
Democratic	Jesse Gabriel (incumbent)	52,362	67.3
Republican	Dana Caruso	25,437	32.7
Total votes		77,799	100.0
General election
Democratic	Jesse Gabriel (incumbent)	78,726	65.4
Republican	Dana Caruso	41,619	34.6
Total votes		120,345	100.0
Democratic hold			

=== 2020 ===
2020 California State Assembly 46th district election
Primary election
Party	Candidate	Votes	%
Democratic	Adrin Nazarian (incumbent)	55,784	69.7
Democratic	Lanira K. Murphy	24,291	30.3
Total votes		80,075	100.0
General election
Democratic	Adrin Nazarian (incumbent)	104,987	63.4
Democratic	Lanira K. Murphy	60,595	36.6
Total votes		165,582	100.0
Democratic hold			

=== 2018 ===
2018 California State Assembly 46th district election
Primary election
Party	Candidate	Votes	%
Democratic	Adrin Nazarian (incumbent)	51,896	79.1
Republican	Roxanne Beckford Hoge	13,672	20.9
Total votes		65,568	100.0
General election
Democratic	Adrin Nazarian (incumbent)	109,938	79.3
Republican	Roxanne Beckford Hoge	28,784	20.7
Total votes		138,722	100.0
Democratic hold			

=== 2016 ===
2016 California State Assembly 46th district election
Primary election
Party	Candidate	Votes	%
Democratic	Adrin Nazarian (incumbent)	51,535	99.6
Democratic	Angela Rupert (write-in)	131	0.3
Republican	Roxanne Beckford Hoge (write-in)	88	0.2
Total votes		51,754	100.0
General election
Democratic	Adrin Nazarian (incumbent)	77,587	56.1
Democratic	Angela Rupert	60,658	43.9
Total votes		138,245	100.0
Democratic hold			

=== 2014 ===
2014 California State Assembly 46th district election
Primary election
Party	Candidate	Votes	%
Democratic	Adrin Nazarian (incumbent)	22,406	70.3
Republican	Zachary Taylor	9,481	29.7
Total votes		31,887	100.0
General election
Democratic	Adrin Nazarian (incumbent)	45,839	71.6
Republican	Zachary Taylor	18,164	28.4
Total votes		64,003	100.0
Democratic hold			

=== 2012 ===
2012 California State Assembly 46th district election
Primary election
Party	Candidate	Votes	%
Democratic	Adrin Nazarian	11,498	27.5
Republican	Jay L. Stern	8,401	20.1
Democratic	Brian C. Johnson	8,370	20.0
Democratic	Andrew B. Lachman	8,085	19.3
Democratic	Laurette Healey	4,502	10.8
Democratic	Adriano Lecaros	1,004	2.4
Total votes		41,860	100.0
General election
Democratic	Adrin Nazarian	92,870	71.0
Republican	Jay L. Stern	37,928	29.0
Total votes		130,798	100.0
Democratic hold			

=== 2010 ===
2010 California State Assembly 46th district election
Party	Candidate	Votes	%
Democratic	John Pérez (incumbent)	38,566	100.0
Total votes		38,566	100.0
Democratic hold			

=== 2008 ===
2008 California State Assembly 46th district election
Party	Candidate	Votes	%
Democratic	John Pérez	51,556	84.9
Republican	Manuel Aldana	9,180	15.1
Total votes		60,736	100.0
Democratic hold			

=== 2006 ===
2006 California State Assembly 46th district election
Party	Candidate	Votes	%
Democratic	Fabian Núñez (incumbent)	30,518	100.0
Total votes		30,518	100.0
Democratic hold			

=== 2004 ===
2004 California State Assembly 46th district election
Party	Candidate	Votes	%
Democratic	Fabian Núñez (incumbent)	44,570	85.0
Republican	Manuel "Manny" Aldana, Jr.	7,837	15.0
Total votes		52,407	100.0
Democratic hold			

=== 2002 ===
2002 California State Assembly 46th district election
Party	Candidate	Votes	%
Democratic	Fabian Núñez	27,227	85.6
Republican	Manuel "Manny" Aldana, Jr.	6,799	14.4
Total votes		34,026	100.0
Democratic hold			

=== 2000 ===
2000 California State Assembly 46th district election
Party	Candidate	Votes	%
Democratic	Gilbert Cedillo (incumbent)	31,919	83.7
Republican	Matt Brown	6,211	16.3
Total votes		38,130	100.0
Democratic hold			

=== 1998 ===
1998 California State Assembly 46th district election
Party	Candidate	Votes	%
Democratic	Gilbert Cedillo (incumbent)	21,654	80.8
Republican	Andrew Kim	5,137	19.2
Total votes		26,791	100.0
Democratic hold			

=== 1998 (special) ===
1998 California State Assembly 46th district special election Vacancy Resulting from the resignation of Louis Caldera
Party	Candidate	Votes	%
Democratic	Gilbert Cedillo	7,152	75.8
Republican	Andrew Kim	2,018	21.4
Libertarian	Patrick Westerberg	261	2.8
Total votes		9,431	100.0
Democratic hold			

=== 1996 ===
1996 California State Assembly 46th district election
Party	Candidate	Votes	%
Democratic	Louis Caldera (incumbent)	22,605	77.5
Republican	Andrew Kim	6,562	22.5
Total votes		29,167	100.0
Democratic hold			

=== 1994 ===
1994 California State Assembly 46th district election
Party	Candidate	Votes	%
Democratic	Louis Caldera (incumbent)	16,264	72.6
Republican	Yongchul Yang	4,762	21.3
Peace and Freedom	William R. Williams	1,378	6.2
Total votes		22,404	100.0
Democratic hold			

=== 1992 ===
1992 California State Assembly 46th district election
Party	Candidate	Votes	%
Democratic	Louis Caldera	21,429	71.8
Republican	David M. Osborne	6,368	21.3
Peace and Freedom	Casey Peters	1,325	4.4
Libertarian	Michael B. Everling	723	2.4
Total votes		34,180	100.0
Democratic hold			

=== 1991 (special) ===
1991 California State Assembly 46th district special election Vacancy resulting from the resignation of Mike Roos
Party	Candidate	Votes	%
Democratic	Barbara Friedman	8,366	72.5
Republican	Geoffrey C. Church	2,420	21.0
Peace and Freedom	Elizabeth A. Nakano	572	5.0
Libertarian	Michael Everling	172	1.5
Total votes		11,530	100.0
Democratic hold			

=== 1990 ===
1990 California State Assembly 46th district election
Party	Candidate	Votes	%
Democratic	Mike Roos (incumbent)	20,454	68.0
Republican	Geoffrey Church	7,383	24.5
Peace and Freedom	Dan Robrish	1,371	4.6
Libertarian	Michael B. Everling	869	2.9
Total votes		30,077	100.0
Democratic hold			

== See also ==
- California State Assembly
- California State Assembly districts
- Districts in California
