= Elizabeth Hughes (politician) =

American politician

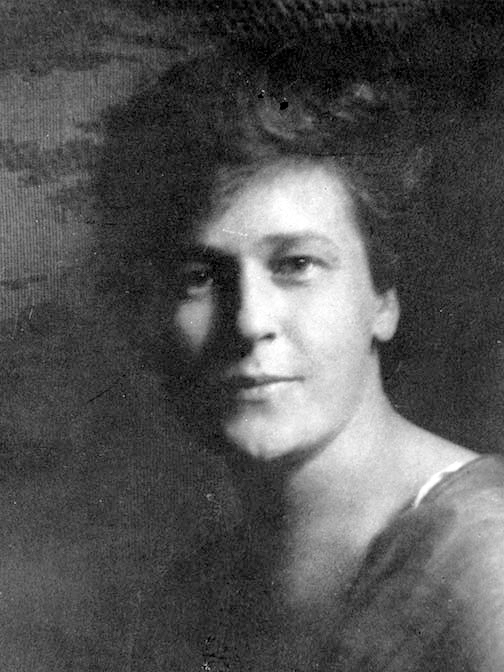

Member of the California State Assembly from the 7th district
- In office January 6, 1919 – January 8, 1923
- Preceded by: C. H. Brown
- Succeeded by: Bert B. Snyder

Personal details
- Born: March 19, 1875 San Francisco, California, US
- Died: March 15, 1941 (aged 65) San Francisco, California, US
- Party: Republican
- Spouse: James B. Hughes

Elizabeth Hughes (March 19, 1875 – March 15, 1941) was an American educator and politician who was one of the four women first elected in 1918 to the California Legislature to serve in the 1919 session of the California State Assembly. She was a member of the Republican Party.

== Family and early life ==
Elizabeth was married to James B. Hughes. They resided in Butte County, California where her husband was the principal of Oroville High School, and she taught school.

== California legislator ==
In 1918 Elizabeth Hughes, along with Esto Bates Broughton, Grace S. Dorris, and Anna L. Saylor, was elected to serve in the 1919 California State Assembly. Hughes was chairwoman of the House Education Committee.
