= Eduardo Garcia (politician) =

American politician

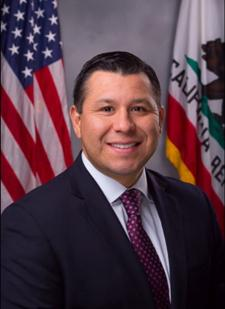

Member of the California Assembly
- In office December 1, 2014 – November 30, 2024
- Preceded by: V. Manuel Perez
- Succeeded by: Jeff Gonzalez
- Constituency: 56th district (2014–2022); 36th district (2022–2024)

Personal details
- Born: February 4, 1977 (age 49) Indio, California, U.S.
- Party: Democratic
- Spouse: Stephanie
- Children: 2
- Education: College of the Desert (AA); University of California, Riverside (BA); University of Southern California (MA)

Eduardo Garcia (born February 4, 1977) is an American politician who represented the 36th district in the California State Assembly from 2014 to 2024, which includes cities and unincorporated communities in eastern Riverside County and Imperial County, including Blythe, Brawley, Bermuda Dunes, Calexico, Calipatria, Cathedral City, Coachella, Desert Hot Springs, El Centro, Heber, Holtville, Imperial, Indio, Mecca, Oasis, North Shore, Salton City, Thermal, Thousand Palms, and Westmorland.

Elected in 2014, Garcia was the chair of Water, Parks and Wildlife. Garcia also served on the Assembly Committees on Appropriations, Communications and Conveyance, Governmental Organization and Utilities and Energy.

In March 2015 Garcia was appointed to chair the Select Committee on Renewable Energy Development and Restoration of the Salton Sea. In his first term he was successful in securing $80.5 million in the State Budget to fund Salton Sea restoration and mitigation projects; such as dust suppression, wetland and habitat recovery.

In 2016, Assemblymember Garcia had over two dozen bills and resolutions signed by Governor Brown.

A graduate of local public schools, Garcia attended Coachella Valley High School and the University of California, Riverside. He also completed the "Senior Executives in State and Local Government" Public Administration program from the John F. Kennedy School of Government at Harvard University and earned a master's degree from the University of Southern California School of Policy, Planning and Development.

Garcia was first elected to the Coachella City Council in November 2004. In 2006, at the age of 29, he became Coachella's first elected Mayor.

He is a father, husband and life-long resident of the Coachella Valley.

Garcia was a member of the California Legislative Progressive Caucus.

== 2016 California State Assembly ==
California's 56th State Assembly district election, 2016
Primary election
Party	Candidate	Votes	%
Democratic	Eduardo Garcia (incumbent)	45,122	100.0
Total votes		45,122	100.0
General election
Democratic	Eduardo Garcia (incumbent)	93,090	100.0
Total votes		93,090	100.0
Democratic hold			

== 2018 California State Assembly ==
California's 56th State Assembly district election, 2018
Primary election
Party	Candidate	Votes	%
Democratic	Eduardo Garcia (incumbent)	31,747	60.3
Republican	Jeff Gonzalez	13,331	25.3
Republican	Jonathan Reiss	7,527	14.3
Total votes		52,605	100.0
General election
Democratic	Eduardo Garcia (incumbent)	62,622	64.8
Republican	Jeff Gonzalez	34,088	35.2
Total votes		96,710	100.0
Democratic hold			

== 2020 California State Assembly ==
2020 California's 56th State Assembly district election
Primary election
Party	Candidate	Votes	%
Democratic	Eduardo Garcia (incumbent)	44,530	64.9%
Republican	America Figueroa	25,074	36.0%
Total votes			

== 2022 California State Assembly ==
2022 California's 36th State Assembly district election
Primary election
Party	Candidate	Votes	%
Democratic	Eduardo Garcia (incumbent)	27,970	48.0
Republican	Ian M. Weeks	25,584	43.9
Democratic	Marlon G. Ware	4,728	8.1
Total votes		58,282	100%
General election
Democratic	Eduardo Garcia (incumbent)	50,482	53.4
Republican	Ian M. Weeks	44,055	46.6
Total votes		94,537	100%
Democratic hold			
