= Adrin Nazarian =

American politician (born 1973)

- Ադրին Նազարեան
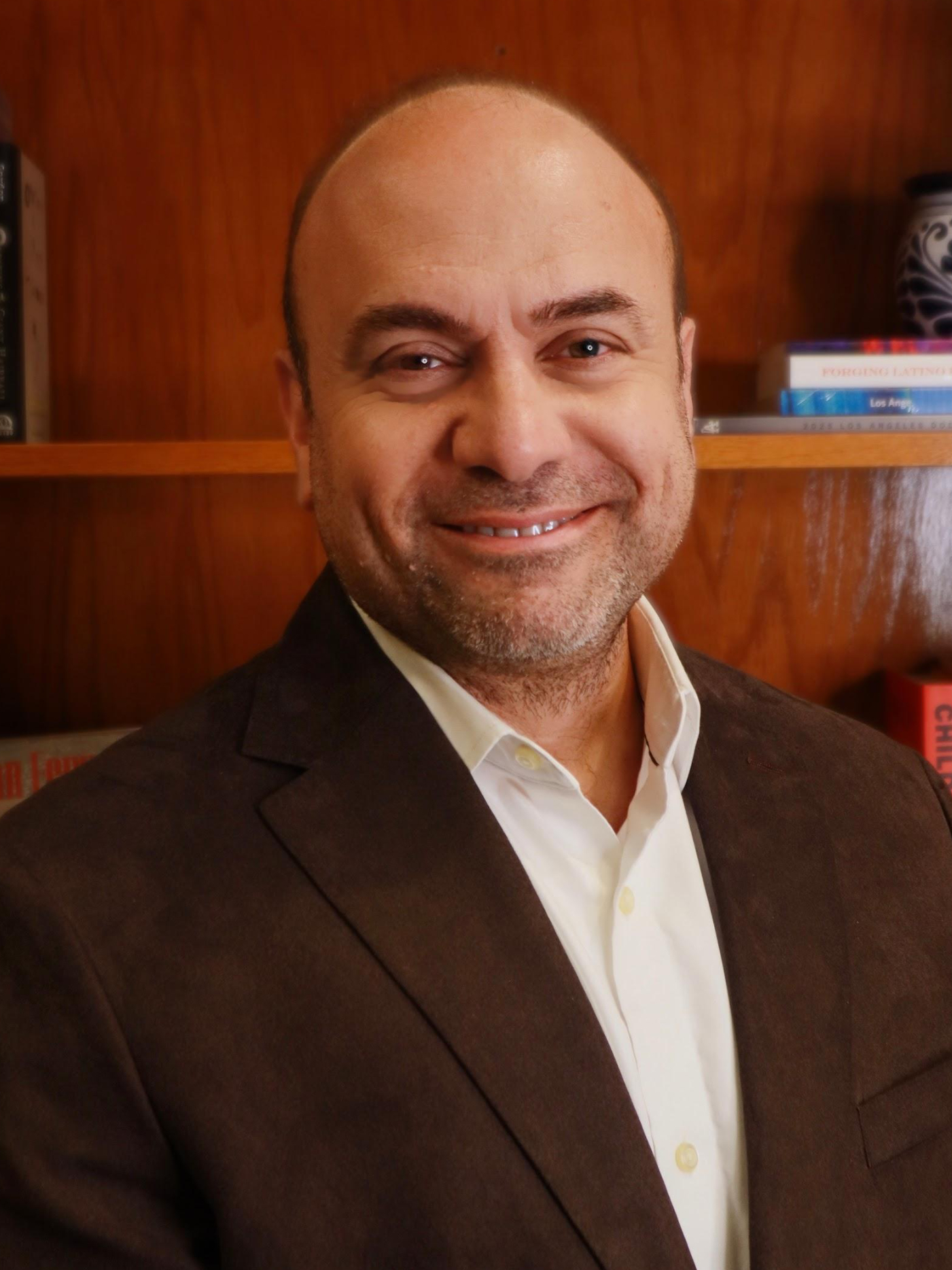
- Official portrait, 2026

Member of the Los Angeles City Council from the 2nd district
- Incumbent
- Assumed office December 9, 2024
- Preceded by: Paul Krekorian

Member of the California State Assembly from the 46th district
- In office December 3, 2012 – December 5, 2022
- Preceded by: John Pérez
- Succeeded by: Jesse Gabriel

Personal details
- Born: March 19, 1973 (age 53) Tehran, Iran
- Party: Democratic
- Spouse: Diana Nazarian (m. 2007)
- Children: 3
- Education: University of California, Los Angeles (BA)
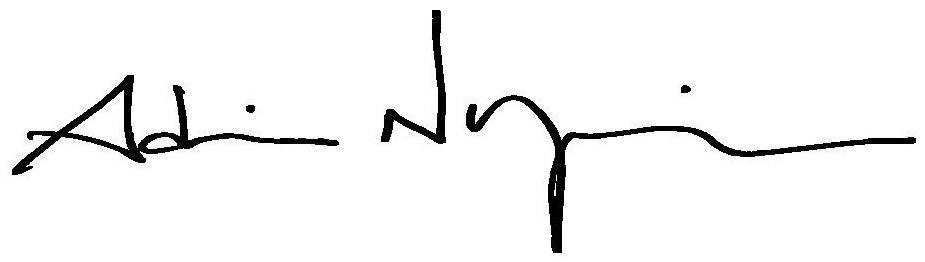
- Signature

Adrin Nazarian (Armenian: Ադրին Նազարեան; born March 19, 1973) is an American politician who is a member of the Los Angeles City Council for the 2nd district since 2024. A member of the Democratic Party, he previously served in the California State Assembly from 2012 to 2022, representing the 46th Assembly District in the central and southern San Fernando Valley.

== Biography ==
Adrin Nazarian was born in Iran. As a child, he immigrated with his family to the San Fernando Valley in Southern California. He grew up there and received his BA degree in Economics from UCLA in 1996.

After graduating UCLA, Nazarian participated in the Coro Fellowship in Public Affairs. From 1997 to 1999, he served as an aide to Congressman Brad Sherman (D-CA), assisting him with business and labor community issues. In 1999, then-Governor Gray Davis appointed Nazarian as Special Assistant to the California Trade and Commerce Agency. During his tenure at the agency, Nazarian helped establish the Division of Science, Technology and Innovation, which focused on creating and maintaining technology-based jobs in California.

Nazarian served as chief of staff to then-Assemblymember Paul Krekorian from 2006 until Krekorian was elected to the Los Angeles City Council in 2010. Nazrian then served as Krekorian's chief of staff at City Hall until 2012.

In February 2022, Nazarian announced that he would not seek reelection in the 2022 California State Assembly election, and also announced that he intended to run in 2024 to replace Krekorian, who was term-limited.

Nazarian has served on the boards of several community-based organizations including the East Valley YMCA and the YWCA. He was one of the founding members of Generation Next Mentorship program which worked with local public schools to give young people alternatives to a life of gangs and drugs.

Nazarian and his wife, Diana, reside in Sherman Oaks with their children Alex, David and Maggie.

== Political positions ==
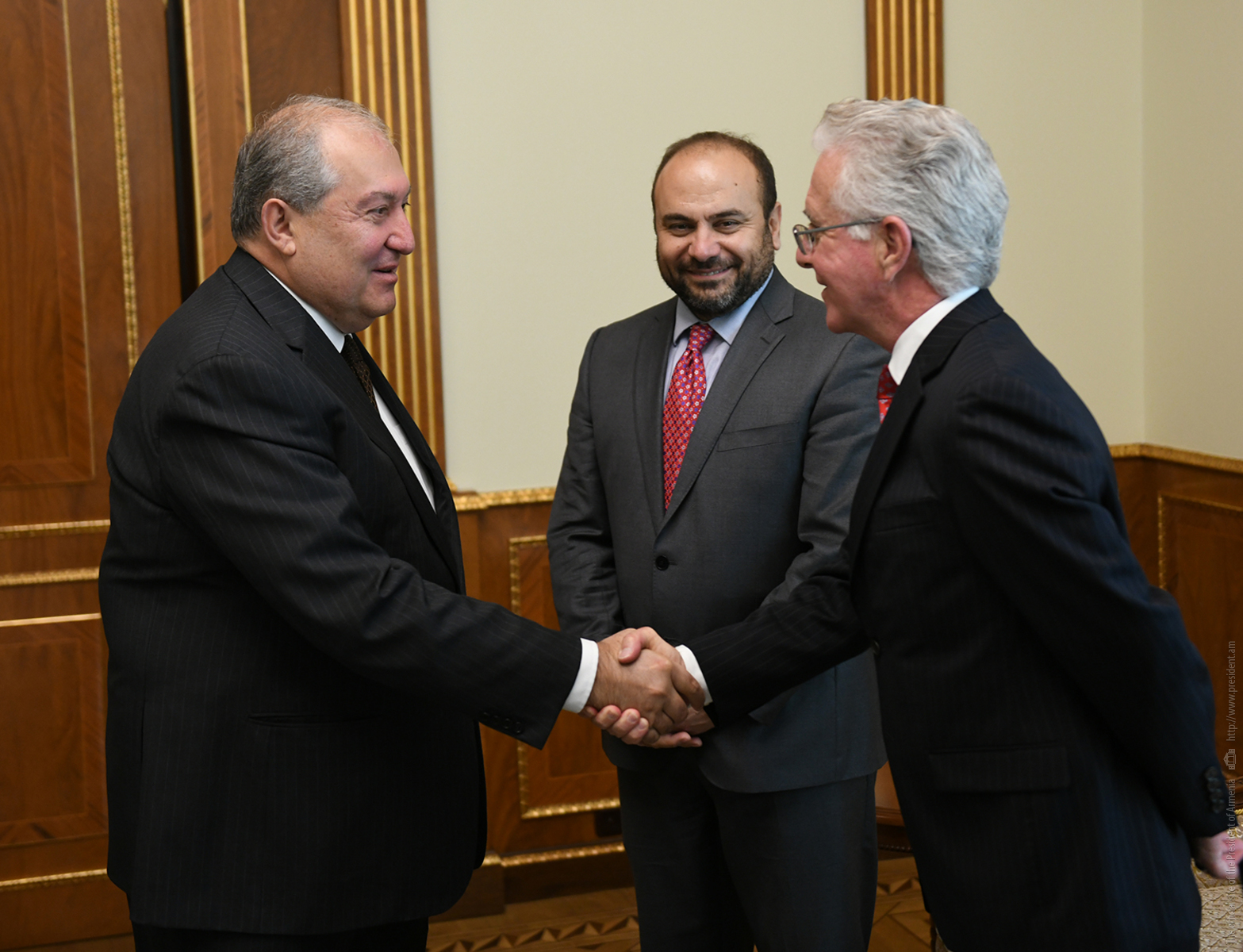
Nazarian (center) with Armenian President Armen Sarkissian and city councilor Paul Krekorian, 2019.

=== Affirmative action ===
Assembly Bill 979, enacted as law in 2020, requires publicly held domestic or foreign corporations whose principal executive office is in California to have a certain minimum numbers of directors from "underrepresented communities" in order to increase diversity on their boards. The term "underrepresented community" is defined as "an individual who self‑identifies as Black, African American, Hispanic, Latino, Asian, Pacific Islander, Native American, Native Hawaiian, or Alaska Native, or who self‑identifies as gay, lesbian, bisexual, or transgender." In 2022, Nazarian attempted, through Assembly Bill 1840, to add Armenians, Assyrians, Greeks, Jews, Muslims, Sikhs and individuals with disabilities, to the list of underrepresented groups.

=== Armenia and Artsakh ===
In response to the Second Nagorno-Karabakh War, Nazarian stated "The United States and other world powers cannot continue to ignore these crimes against the Armenian people. While western global leaders ask for “peace” Turkey has provided arms and even transported Syrian mercenaries to Azerbaijan to fight with Aliyev’s army. Armenia is a thriving democracy, growing stronger each year. We know who the aggressors are and it is time that the international community acknowledges their complicity in these attacks. It's time the Western powers stopped prioritizing a few cheap barrels of oil over human life and peace."

In response to news coverage of the war, Nazarian called upon journalists to present the facts truthfully and in their entirety, stating "It’s your responsibility to make sure that people have a historical context and understand what is going on."

In response to the ongoing destruction of Armenian cultural and historical sites, Nazarian introduced a cultural heritage preservation bill (Assembly Bill 1815), which "would prohibit a museum in California that receives public funding from displaying any country-funded item or artifact, or sending to a country or receiving from a country any item or artifact, if that country has received an adverse judgment by the International Court of Justice regarding its destruction of cultural heritage artifacts or sites."

=== LGBTQ+ Rights ===
In 2021, Nazarian introduced Assembly Bill 465, which requires that professional fiduciaries receive LGBTQ+ cultural competency and sensitivity training during their education and licensing process.

Nazarian hosted an October 2022 fundraiser brunch for GALAS LGBTQ+ Armenian Society, where the organization and its members received awards and recognition from local elected officials, including Los Angeles County Supervisors Kathryn Barger and Hilda Solis and Los Angeles City Councilmember Paul Krekorian.

== Electoral history ==
=== 2012 ===
California's 46th State Assembly district election, 2012
Primary election
Party	Candidate	Votes	%
Democratic	Adrin Nazarian	11,498	27.5
Republican	Jay L. Stern	8,401	20.1
Democratic	Brian C. Johnson	8,370	20.0
Democratic	Andrew B. Lachman	8,085	19.3
Democratic	Laurette Healey	4,502	10.8
Democratic	Adriano Lecaros	1,004	2.4
Total votes		41,860	100.0
General election
Democratic	Adrin Nazarian	92,870	71.0
Republican	Jay L. Stern	37,928	29.0
Total votes		130,798	100.0
Democratic win (new seat)			

=== 2014 ===
California's 46th State Assembly district election, 2014
Primary election
Party	Candidate	Votes	%
Democratic	Adrin Nazarian (incumbent)	22,406	70.3
Republican	Zachary Taylor (California)	9,481	29.7
Total votes		31,887	100.0
General election
Democratic	Adrin Nazarian (incumbent)	45,839	71.6
Republican	Zachary Taylor (California)	18,164	28.4
Total votes		64,003	100.0
Democratic hold			

=== 2016 ===
California's 46th State Assembly district election, 2016
Primary election
Party	Candidate	Votes	%
Democratic	Adrin Nazarian (incumbent)	51,535	99.6
Democratic	Angela Rupert (write-in)	131	0.3
Republican	Roxanne Beckford Hoge (write-in)	88	0.2
Total votes		51,754	100.0
General election
Democratic	Adrin Nazarian (incumbent)	77,587	56.1
Democratic	Angela Rupert	60,658	43.9
Total votes		138,245	100.0
Democratic hold			

=== 2018 ===
California's 46th State Assembly district election, 2018
Primary election
Party	Candidate	Votes	%
Democratic	Adrin Nazarian (incumbent)	51,896	79.1%
Republican	Roxanne Beckford Hoge	13,672	20.9%
Total votes		65,568	100.0
General election
Democratic	Adrin Nazarian (incumbent)	109,938	79.3%
Republican	Roxanne Beckford Hoge	28,784	20.7%
Total votes		138,722	100.0
Democratic hold			
