= George C. Cleveland =

American politician (1874–1935)

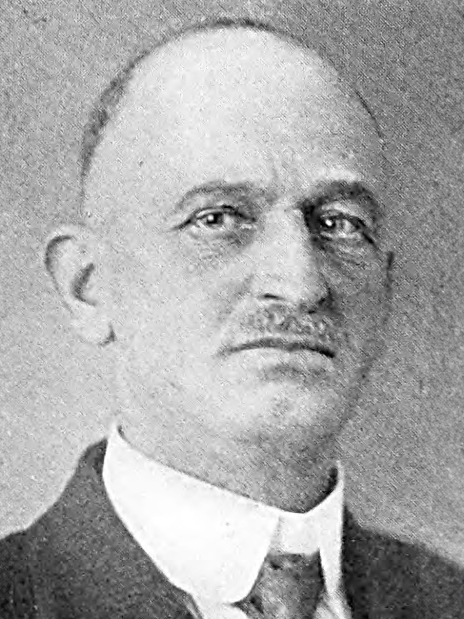

Member of the California Senate from the 11th district
- In office January 7, 1929 – January 2, 1933
- Preceded by: M. B. Johnson
- Succeeded by: Frank L. Gordon

Member of the California State Assembly from the 43rd district
- In office January 3, 1921 – January 3, 1927
- Preceded by: Champ S. Price
- Succeeded by: Bert B. Snyder

Member of the California State Assembly from the 54th district
- In office January 2, 1905 – January 7, 1907
- Preceded by: Harry S. Wanzer
- Succeeded by: Harry C. Lucas

Personal details
- Born: March 10, 1874 Ottawa, Ontario, Canada
- Died: January 19, 1935 (aged 60) Watsonville, California
- Party: Republican
- Spouse: Alma J. Peterson

Military service
- Branch/service: United States Army
- Battles/wars: Spanish–American War; World War I

George C. Cleveland (March 10, 1874 – January 19, 1935) was an American politician who served in the California State Assembly for the 54th district from 1905 to 1907 and the 43rd district from 1921 to 1927. He served in the California State Senate for the 11th district from 1929 to 1933. During the Spanish–American War, he served in the United States Army.
