= California's 23rd district =

California's 23rd district may refer to:

- California's 23rd congressional district
- California's 23rd State Assembly district
- California's 23rd State Senate district
