= Cloudman =

Cloudman may refer to:

- Cloud Man (c. 1780–1862/1863), a Dakota chief
- Cloudman Hall (Georgia Tech), a dormitory
- Harold C. Cloudman, a California politician
- John Greenleaf Cloudman (1813–1892), a painter
- Cloudman, a mascot for the Trenton Thunder baseball team
