= California's 40th district =

California's 40th district may refer to:

- California's 40th congressional district
- California's 40th State Assembly district
- California's 40th State Senate district
