= James Ramos =

American politician

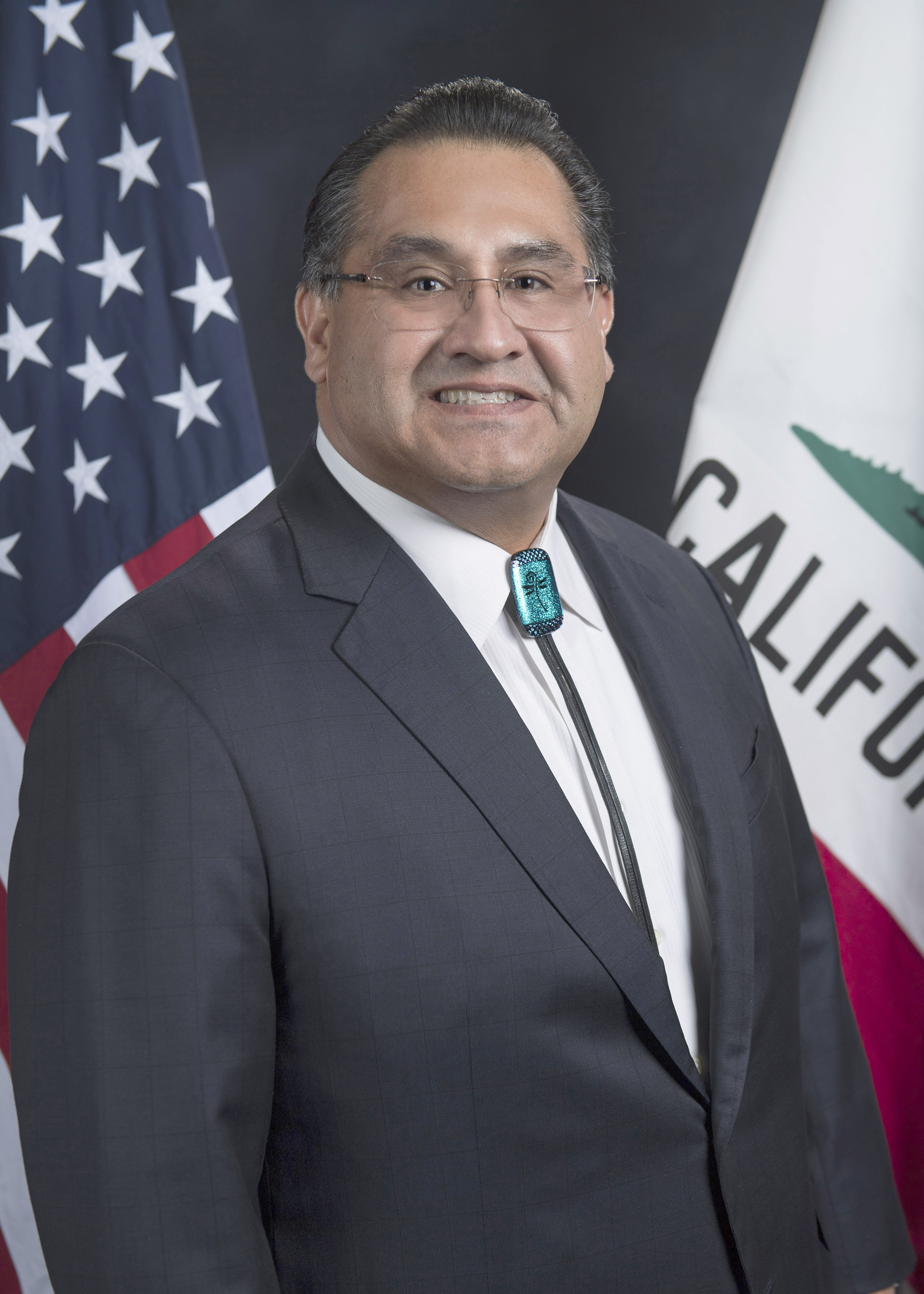

Member of the California State Assembly
- Incumbent
- Assumed office December 3, 2018
- Preceded by: Marc Steinorth
- Constituency: 40th district (2018–2022); 45th district (2022–present)

Personal details
- Born: January 29, 1967 (age 59) San Manuel Indian Reservation, California, U.S.
- Party: Democratic

James C. Ramos (born January 29, 1967) is an American politician who is currently in the California State Assembly. A Democrat, he represents the 45th Assembly District, which encompasses the San Bernardino County community of Muscoy and parts of Highland, Fontana, Redlands, Mentone and the city of San Bernardino. Prior to being elected to the State Assembly, he served on the San Bernardino County Board of Supervisors and as a Trustee on the San Bernardino Community College District Board of Trustees.

Ramos was first elected to the State Assembly in November 2018 after defeating Republican San Bernardino City Councilman Henry Gomez Nickel. Ramos is the first Native American and Native Californian to be elected to the State Assembly and to serve in the State Legislature. He is a member of the Yuhaaviatam of San Manuel Nation and served on the tribal council prior to elected office.

== Electoral history ==
=== San Bernardino County Board of Supervisors ===
2012 San Bernardino County Board of Supervisors 3rd district election
Primary election
Candidate	Votes	%
James Ramos	23,719	47.1
Neil Derry	16,551	32.9
Jim Bagley	10,040	20.0
Total votes	50,310	100.0
General election
James Ramos	67,382	59.1
Neil Derry	46,569	40.9
Total votes	113,951	100.0

2016 San Bernardino County Board of Supervisors 3rd district election
Primary election
Candidate	Votes	%
James Ramos (incumbent)	45,838	64.6
Donna Munoz	25,142	35.4
Total votes	70,980	100.0

=== California State Assembly ===
2018 California State Assembly 40th district election
Primary election
Party	Candidate	Votes	%
Republican	Henry Gomez Nickel	29,550	45.7
Democratic	James Ramos	26,297	40.7
Democratic	Libbern Gwen Cook	8,777	13.6
Total votes		64,624	100.0
General election
Democratic	James Ramos	77,585	59.5
Republican	Henry Gomez Nickel	52,746	40.5
Total votes		130,331	100.0
Democratic gain from Republican			

2020 California State Assembly 40th district election
Primary election
Party	Candidate	Votes	%
Democratic	James Ramos (incumbent)	54,923	59.4
Republican	Jennifer Tullius	37,590	40.6
Total votes		92,513	100.0
General election
Democratic	James Ramos (incumbent)	111,885	58.4
Republican	Jennifer Tullius	79,821	41.6
Total votes		191,706	100.0
Democratic hold			

2022 California State Assembly 45th district election
Primary election
Party	Candidate	Votes	%
Democratic	James Ramos (incumbent)	26,402	64.1
Republican	Joe Martinez	14,783	35.9
Total votes		41,185	100.0
General election
Democratic	James Ramos (incumbent)	45,194	60.7
Republican	Joe Martinez	29,209	39.3
Total votes		74,403	100.0
Democratic hold			

2024 California State Assembly 45th district election
Primary election
Party	Candidate	Votes	%
Democratic	James Ramos (incumbent)	31,826	99.0
Republican	Scott Olson (write-in)	334	1.0
Total votes		32,160	100.0
General election
Democratic	James Ramos (incumbent)	87,062	63.8
Republican	Scott Olson	49,304	36.2
Total votes		136,366	100.0
Democratic hold			
