= Suzette Martinez Valladares =

American politician (born 1980)

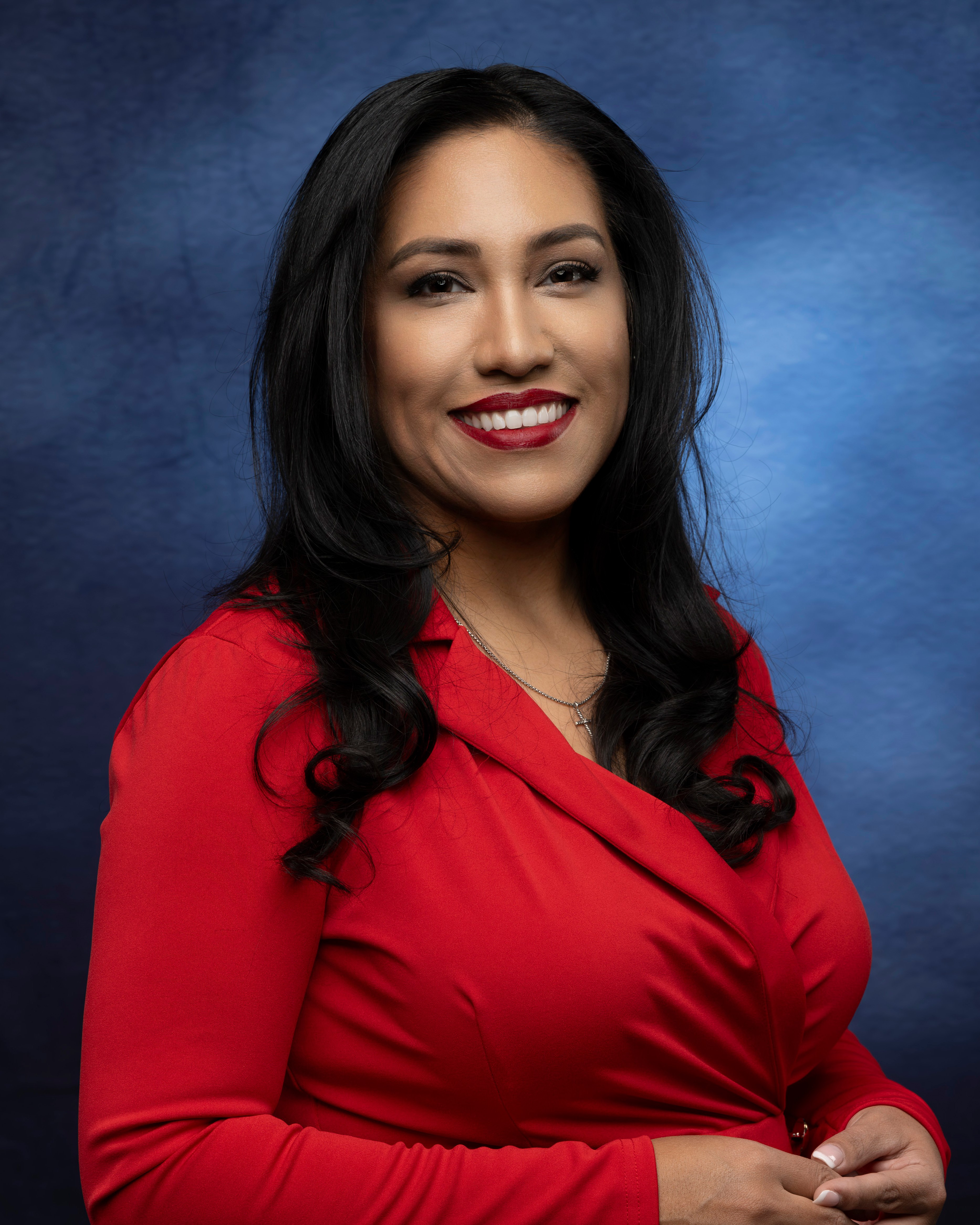
- Official portrait, 2024

Member of the California State Senate from the 23rd district
- Incumbent
- Assumed office December 2, 2024
- Preceded by: Scott Wilk (redistricting)

Member of the California State Assembly from the 38th district
- In office December 7, 2020 – November 30, 2022
- Preceded by: Christy Smith
- Succeeded by: Steve Bennett

Personal details
- Born: Suzette Martinez; December 21, 1980 (age 45) Sylmar, California, U.S.
- Party: Republican
- Spouse: Shane Valladares
- Children: 1
- Education: College of the Canyons (AA); California State University, Northridge (BA)

Suzette Martinez Valladares (born December 21, 1980) is an American politician who is a member of the California State Senate since 2024, representing the 23rd district. A member of the Republican Party, she previously served as a member of the California State Assembly from the 38th district, which included the Santa Clarita Valley and Simi Valley. Elected in 2020, she assumed office on December 7, 2020. In 2022, she ran in the newly redrawn 40th Assembly district, and narrowly lost the election to Pilar Schiavo by a 50.2% to 49.8% margin.

== Early life and education ==
Valladares was born in Sylmar, Los Angeles and graduated from Sylmar High School in 1999. A third-generation Californian, her grandfather was a farmworker who worked alongside Cesar Chavez in vineyards near Bakersfield. She earned an associate degree from the College of the Canyons and a Bachelor of Arts degree in political science from California State University, Northridge.

== Career ==
From 2009 to 2012, Valladares was a district representative for Congressman Buck McKeon. In 2014, she was a candidate for the 36th district in the California State Assembly. In 2014 and 2015, she worked as the California Director of Hispanic Initiatives for the Republican National Committee. From 2015 to 2018, she was the executive director of Southern California Autism Speaks. In 2018, she was a candidate for California's 25th congressional district before withdrawing from the race to run for state assembly.

In 2020, Valladares became one of two Republican nominees for the 38th district in the California State Assembly after incumbent Democrat Christy Smith announced that she would not seek re-election and instead focus on her run for the United States House of Representatives against Mike Garcia. Valladares placed first in the nonpartisan blanket primary and defeated fellow Republican Lucie Lapointe Volotzky, a furniture store owner, in the November general election.

In 2021, Valladares became one of the inaugural members of the California State Legislature's "Problem Solvers Caucus," a bipartisan group consisting of members of both the State Assembly and State Senate. The Problem Solvers Caucus says that their goal is to "create a group of legislators committed more to progress than to ideology."

== Personal life ==
Valladares and her husband, Shane, have one daughter and live in Santa Clarita, California.

== Electoral history ==
2020 California State Assembly 38th district election
Primary election
Party	Candidate	Votes	%
Republican	Suzette Martinez Valladares	39,481	31.8
Republican	Lucie Lapointe Volotzky	21,942	17.6
Democratic	Annie E. Cho	15,498	12.5
Democratic	Kelvin Driscoll	14,868	12.0
Democratic	Brandii Grace	14,387	11.6
Democratic	Dina Cervantes	10,900	8.8
Democratic	Susan M. Christopher	7,255	5.8
Total votes		124,331	100.0
General election
Republican	Suzette Martinez Valladares	149,201	76.1
Republican	Lucie Lapointe Volotzky	46,877	23.9
Total votes		196,078	100.0
Republican gain from Democratic			

2022 California State Assembly 40th district election
Primary election
Party	Candidate	Votes	%
Republican	Suzette Martinez Valladares (incumbent)	48,096	47.4
Democratic	Pilar Schiavo	34,415	33.9
Democratic	Annie E. Cho	18,891	18.6
Total votes		101,402	100.0
General election
Democratic	Pilar Schiavo	79,852	50.2
Republican	Suzette Martinez Valladares (incumbent)	79,330	49.8
Total votes		159,182	100.0
Democratic gain from Republican			

2024 California State Senate 23rd district election
Primary election
Party	Candidate	Votes	%
Republican	Suzette Martinez Valladares	50,937	32.8
Democratic	Kipp Mueller	45,754	29.4
Republican	James "DJ" Hamburger	37,075	23.8
Democratic	Blanca Azucena Gomez	14,257	9.2
Democratic	Ollie M. McCaulley	7,439	4.8
Total votes		155,462	100.0
General election
Republican	Suzette Martinez Valladares	190,957	52.4
Democratic	Kipp Mueller	173,695	47.6
Total votes		364,652	100.0
Republican hold			
