= Barbara Friedman =

American politician (born 1949)

Member of the California State Assembly from the 40th district
- In office December 7, 1992 – November 30, 1996
- Preceded by: Tom Bane
- Succeeded by: Robert Hertzberg

Member of the California State Assembly from the 46th district
- In office August 1, 1991 – November 30, 1992
- Preceded by: Mike Roos
- Succeeded by: Louis Caldera

Personal details
- Born: September 1, 1949 (age 76) Los Angeles, California, U.S.
- Party: Democratic

Barbara Friedman (born September 1, 1949) is an American politician who served in the California State Assembly from 1991 to 1996.
