= Rosilicie Ochoa Bogh =

American politician (born 1972)

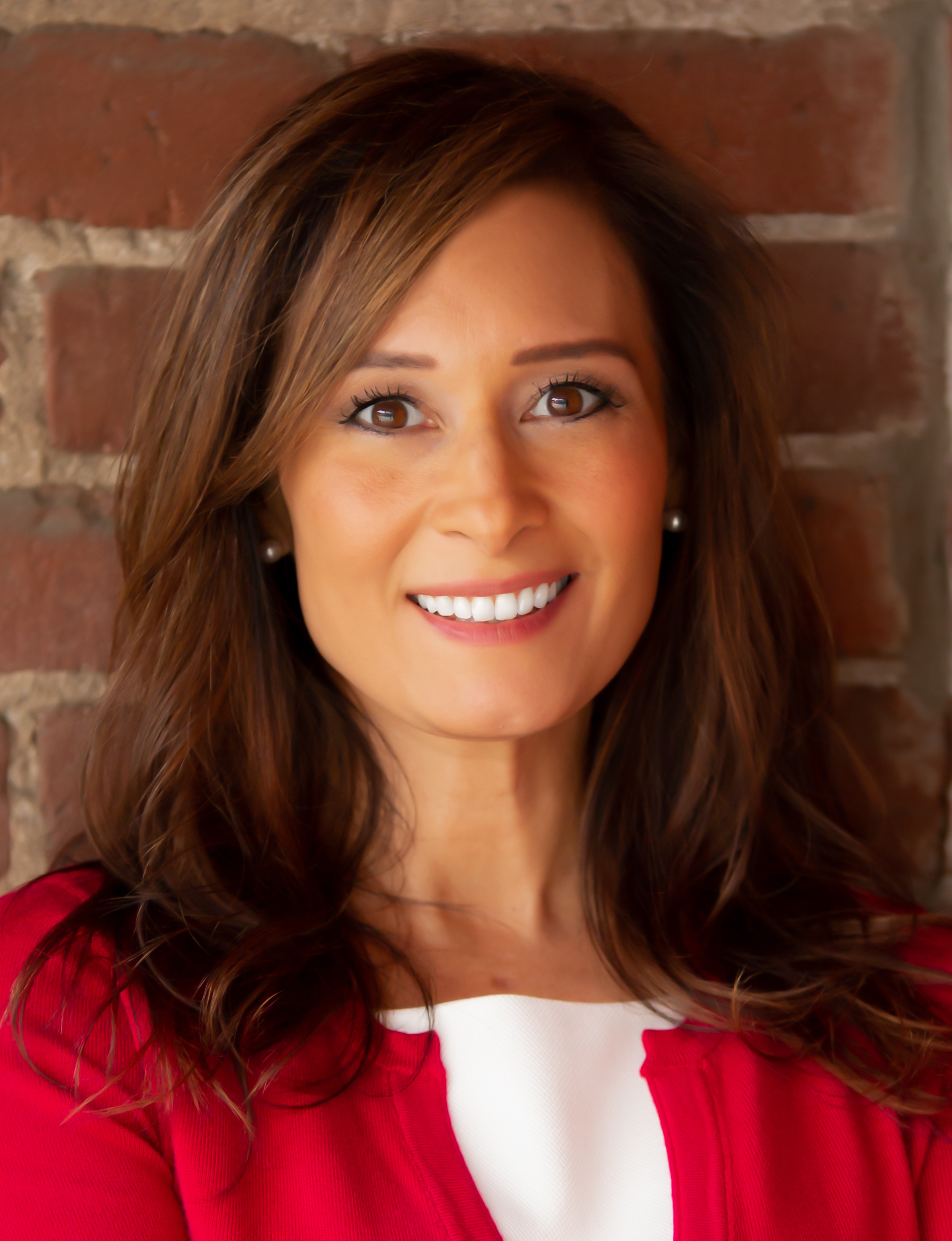

Member of the California State Senate
- Incumbent
- Assumed office December 7, 2020
- Preceded by: Mike Morrell
- Constituency: 23rd district (2020–2024); 19th district (2024–present)

Personal details
- Born: Rosilicie Ochoa; June 30, 1972 (age 54) California, U.S.
- Party: Republican
- Spouse: Greg Bogh (m. 1996)
- Children: 3
- Education: UC Santa Barbara(BA)

Rosilicie Ochoa Bogh (born June 30, 1972) is an American politician, businesswoman, and former educator who is a member of the California State Senate from the 19th district. Elected in 2020, she is the first Republican Latina state senator in California's history.

== Early life and education ==
Ochoa Bogh was born in California, the daughter of Mexican immigrants. As a child, she lived in Hawaii, Mexico, and Florida before settling in San Bernardino, California. She graduated from San Bernardino High School and the University of California, Santa Barbara. Bogh then earned her teaching credential from California State University, San Bernardino.

== Career ==
After graduating from UC Santa Barbara, Ochoa Bogh worked as an English teacher. She also served on the Yucaipa-Calimesa Joint Unified School District School Board. Ochoa Bogh has since worked as a real estate agent in Yucaipa.

In July 2019, Ochoa Bogh announced her candidacy for the California State Senate. In the nonpartisan blanket primary, she placed second in a field of five candidates, outpolling conservative Beaumont City Councilman Lloyd White. In the November general election, she defeated the Democratic nominee, San Bernardino School Board Trustee Abigail Medina, by a 5% margin and assumed office December 7, 2020. She is the first Latina California state senator of the Republican Party.

In February 2025, Ochoa Bogh attended a press conference in San Diego to promote Minority Leader Brian Jones' proposed bill "Safety Before Criminal Sanctuary" that would weaken California's SB54 that limits law enforcement's ability to cooperate with ICE.

== Personal life ==
Ochoa Bogh met her husband, Greg Bogh, while they were attending High School. They moved to Yucaipa, California in 2002. As of 2024, Greg Bogh was a former mayor and member of the Yucaipa City Council. They have three children.

== Electoral history ==
=== 2020 ===
2020 California State Senate 23rd district election
Primary election
Party	Candidate	Votes	%
Democratic	Abigail Medina	59,881	28.1
Republican	Rosilicie Ochoa Bogh	52,820	24.8
Republican	Lloyd White	46,267	21.7
Democratic	Kris Goodfellow	37,153	17.4
Republican	Cristina Puraci	17,028	8.0
Total votes		213,149	100.0
General election
Republican	Rosilicie Ochoa Bogh	224,945	52.5
Democratic	Abigail Medina	203,403	47.5
Total votes		428,348	100.0
Republican hold			

=== 2024 ===
2024 California State Senate 19th district election
Primary election
Party	Candidate	Votes	%
Republican	Rosilicie Ochoa Bogh (incumbent)	101,118	53.8
Democratic	Lisa Middleton	86,975	46.2
Total votes		188,093	100.0
General election
Republican	Rosilicie Ochoa Bogh (incumbent)	209,739	54.8
Democratic	Lisa Middleton	173,291	45.2
Total votes		383,030	100.0
Republican hold			
