= Tom Bane =

American politician

Member of the California State Assembly from the 40th district
- In office December 2, 1974 - November 30, 1992
- Preceded by: Alex P. Garcia
- Succeeded by: Barbara Friedman

Member of the California State Assembly from the 42nd district
- In office January 5, 1959 - January 4, 1965
- Preceded by: William F. Marsh
- Succeeded by: Bob Moretti

Personal details
- Born: December 28, 1913 Los Angeles, California
- Died: April 11, 1999 (aged 85) Los Angeles, California
- Party: Democratic
- Spouse: Claire Brown (m. 1939)
- Children: 1

Tom Bane (December 28, 1913 – April 11, 1999) was an American politician who served in the California State Assembly from 1959 to 1965 and from 1974 to 1992.

== Early life and education ==
Bane was born on December 28, 1913, in Los Angeles and graduated from Burbank High School in 1932. His father was a state highway inspector and the family moved frequently. He attended Los Angeles City College and one of his first jobs was working at the Bullocks Wilshire department store.

== Career ==
Bane worked at various times in the banking industry and as the head of a non-profit organization, but he is best known for his 24 years of service in the California Assembly, serving first from 1959-1965 and later from 1974-1992. Bane was a liberal Democrat whose district covered large parts of the San Fernando Valley. He was the sponsor of the Tom Bane Civil Rights Act, a hate crimes law that was enacted in 1987.

== Personal life ==
Bane was married to Claire Louise Brown in 1939, and together they had one son. Bane was married to his second wife, Marlene (Rothstein) Bane, from 1979 until his death. Together they had three children and six grandchildren.

== Death ==
Bane died on April 11, 1999, in Los Angeles, California, at age 85.
