= Bill Emmerson =

American orthodontist and politician from California

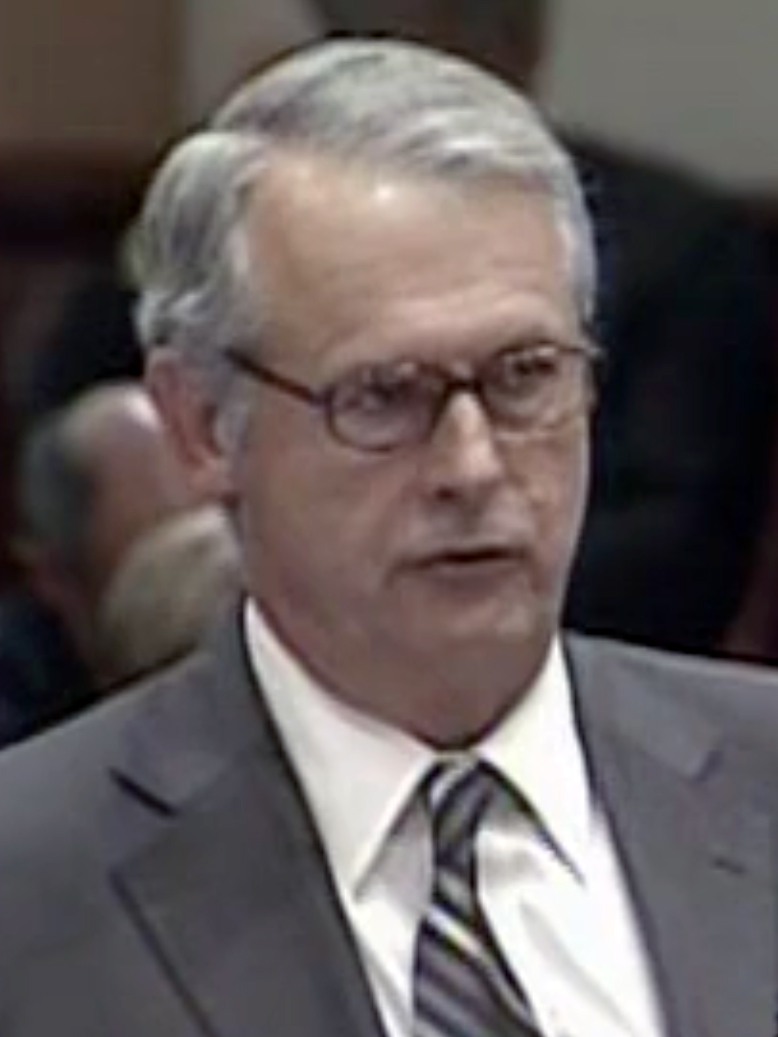
- Emmerson in 2010

Member of the California State Senate
- In office June 9, 2010 – December 1, 2013
- Preceded by: John J. Benoit
- Succeeded by: Mike Morrell
- Constituency: 37th district (2010–2012); 23rd district (2012–2013)

Member of the California State Assembly from the 63rd district
- In office December 6, 2004 – June 9, 2010
- Preceded by: Bob Dutton
- Succeeded by: Mike Morrell

Personal details
- Born: October 28, 1945 (age 80) Oakland, California, U.S.
- Party: Republican
- Spouse: Nan Emmerson
- Children: 2
- Education: La Sierra University (B.A.); American University; Loma Linda University (D.D.S., M.S.)
- Occupation: Orthodontist, politician
- Website: www.calhospital.org/profile/william-j-emmerson-dds

William Emmerson (born October 28, 1945) is a former Republican California State Senator who represented the 23rd district in Riverside County. He previously represented the 37th Senate District, having been elected in a June 8, 2010, special election and sworn into office the next day. Preceding his tenure in the State Senate, Emmerson served as California State Assemblyman from the District 63 representing the counties of Riverside and San Bernardino, having been first elected in November 2004.

== Early life and education ==
Born in Oakland, California, his family moved to Orange County when his father opened a dental practice in Corona Del Mar, then moved again to Riverside County, where he attended high school.

Emmerson received a B.A. degree in history and political science from La Sierra University in Riverside, California. He then studied public administration at American University in Washington, D.C., while working as an aide for Congressman Jerry Pettis. Emmerson moved back to California and joined the staff of the Assembly Majority Leader W. Craig Biddle, where he worked from 1969 to 1974 while also continuing his post graduate studies at California State University, Sacramento.

== Career ==
He then enrolled in The School of Dentistry of Loma Linda University. Upon graduating with his D.D.S. (1980) and M.S. (1982) degrees, Emmerson embarked upon a 26-year orthodontic practice in Hemet. He served as president of Tri-County Dental Society, chair of the California Dental Association's Council on Legislation, and chair of the Association's Political Action Committee.

== Volunteer work ==
Emmerson helped to establish the dental hygiene program at Riverside Community College and to rehabilitate Redlands Fire Station 1, and served on the alumni association of Loma Linda University. He is active in the Kiwanis Club of Hemet, and he serves as a board member on the Ramona Bowl Advisory Board and as a volunteer with the Kiwanis Club of Redlands and Redlands Bicycle Classic.

== Personal life ==
Bill and his wife, Nan, have two daughters, Kate and Caroline.
