= William F. Marsh =

American politician

Member of the California State Assembly from the 42nd district
- In office January 5, 1953 - January 5, 1959
- Preceded by: Everett G. Burkhalter
- Succeeded by: Tom Bane

Personal details
- Born: January 13, 1916 Orange, New Jersey
- Died: March 20, 1995 (aged 79) Tucson, Arizona
- Party: Republican
- Spouse: Mary Jane Streff (m. 1939)
- Children: 2

Military service
- Branch/service: United States Marine Corps
- Battles/wars: World War II

William Francis Marsh (January 13, 1916 - March 20, 1995) served in the California State Assembly for the 42nd district from 1953 to 1959. During World War II he served in the United States Marine Corps.
