= Tom Bane Civil Rights Act =

California law that protects constitutional rights

The Bane Act (California Civil Code § 52.1.), also known as the Tom Bane Civil Rights Act, is a civil code in California Law that forbids people from interfering with a person's constitutional rights by force or threat of violence.

A lawsuit under the Bane Act is a civil claim against someone who has attempted or managed to interfere with someone's civil rights (as guaranteed by state and federal law in the United States) through any act or acts of coercion, violence, threats of violence, or intimidation, including victims of hate crime violence.

The rights protected under the Bane Act are inclusive of the right to vote, speak, bear arms, etc. One example of such a lawsuit followed the death of actress Vanessa Marquez, whose mother's attorneys filed a claim against the City of South Pasadena, California for violation of the Bane Act.

== History ==
The Bane Act was originally enacted in 1987 'to stem a tide of hate crimes.' (Venegas v. County of Los Angeles (2004) 32 Cal.4th 820, 845 (conc. opn. of Baxter, J.).)

This civil code was created by California State Assemblyman Tom Bane, becoming an official law in 1988 that mandated heavy punishment for hate crimes committed in California.
