= California's 40th State Assembly district =

American legislative district

Current assemblymember
Pilar Schiavo; D–Chatsworth
- Population (2020) • Voting age • Citizen voting age: 517,085; 406,132; 349,018
- Demographics: 51.08% White; 5.23% Black; 26.66% Latino; 14.11% Asian; 0.54% Native American; 0.63% Hawaiian/Pacific Islander; 0.61% other; 0% remainder of multiracial
- Registered voters: 325,021
- Registration: 42.27% Democratic; 28.73% Republican; 22.24% No party preference

California's 40th State Assembly district is one of 80 California State Assembly districts. It is currently represented by Democrat Pilar Schiavo of Chatsworth.

== District profile ==
The district encompasses parts of Los Angeles County. This district stretches from Santa Clarita in the north to neighborhoods in the City of Los Angeles in the south.

Los Angeles County – 5.8%

- Los Angeles – 5.82%
- Santa Clarita

== Election results from statewide races ==
Year	Office	Results
2024	President	Harris 52.7 - 44.3%
2024	Senator	Schiff 53.0 - 47.0%
2022	Governor	Newsom 52.6 - 47.4%
2022	Senator	Padilla 55.1 - 44.9%
2020	President	Biden 56.3 – 41.3%
2018	Governor	Newsom 53.7 – 46.3%
2018	Senator	de León 50.8 – 49.2%
2016	President	Clinton 54.1 – 40.0%
2016	Senator	Harris 60.1 – 39.9%
2014	Governor	Kashkari 51.5 – 48.5%
2012	President	Obama 53.1 – 44.7%
2012	Senator	Feinstein 54.1 – 45.9%

== List of assembly members representing the district ==
Due to redistricting, the 40th district has been moved around different parts of the state. The current iteration resulted from the 2021 redistricting by the California Citizens Redistricting Commission.

Assembly members	Party	Years served	Counties represented	Notes
Daniel J. Leary	Democratic	January 5, 1885 – January 3, 1887	San Francisco	
Andrew J. Martin	Republican	January 3, 1887 – January 7, 1889	San Francisco	
Edward Murray	Democratic	January 7, 1889 – January 5, 1891	San Francisco	
Thomas W. Dennis	Republican	January 5, 1891 – January 2, 1893	San Francisco	
Edmond Godchaux	Democratic	January 2, 1893 – January 7, 1895	San Francisco	
Sigmund M. Bettman	Republican	January 7, 1895 – January 2, 1899	San Francisco	
Henry W. Miller	Republican	January 2, 1899 – January 1, 1901	San Francisco	
Hamilton A. Bauer	Republican	January 1, 1901 – January 5, 1903	San Francisco	
Leo H. Susman	Republican	January 5, 1903 – January 2, 1905	San Francisco	
Gus Hartman	Republican	January 2, 1905 – January 7, 1907	San Francisco	
Henry Thompson	Republican	January 7, 1907 – January 4, 1909	San Francisco	
Milton L. Schmitt	Republican	January 4, 1909 – January 6, 1913	San Francisco	
George Gelder	Republican	January 6, 1913 – January 6, 1919	Alameda	
George Gelder	Progressive	January 6, 1913 – January 6, 1919	Alameda	
George Gelder	Republican	January 6, 1913 – January 6, 1919	Alameda	
Arthur A. Wendering	Republican	January 6, 1919 – January 8, 1923	Alameda	
Chris B. Fox	Republican	January 8, 1923 – January 5, 1925	Alameda	
Harold C. Cloudman	Republican	January 5, 1925 – January 2, 1933	Alameda	
James J. McBride	Democratic	January 2, 1933 – January 4, 1937	Ventura	
Fred P. Muldoon	Democratic	January 4, 1937 – January 2, 1939	Ventura	
Roscoe W. Burson	Republican	January 2, 1939 – January 6, 1941	Ventura	
John B. Cooke	Democratic	January 6, 1941 – January 4, 1943	Ventura	
William H. Rosenthal	Democratic	January 4, 1943 – January 5, 1953	Los Angeles	
Edward E. Elliott	Democratic	January 5, 1953 – January 6, 1969	Los Angeles	
Alex P. Garcia	Democratic	January 6, 1969 – November 30, 1974	Los Angeles	
Tom Bane	Democratic	December 2, 1974 – November 30, 1992	Los Angeles	
Barbara Friedman	Democratic	December 7, 1992 – November 30, 1996	Los Angeles	
Robert Hertzberg	Democratic	December 2, 1996 – November 30, 2002	Los Angeles	
Lloyd E. Levine	Democratic	December 2, 2002 – November 30, 2008	Los Angeles	
Bob Blumenfield	Democratic	December 1, 2008 – November 30, 2012	Los Angeles	
Mike Morrell	Republican	December 3, 2012 – April 3, 2014	San Bernardino	Resigned from the California State Assembly to be sworn in the California State Senate after winning a special election for the 23rd district.
Vacant		April 3, 2014 – December 1, 2014	San Bernardino	
Marc Steinorth	Republican	December 1, 2014 – November 30, 2018	San Bernardino	
James Ramos	Democratic	December 3, 2018 – November 30, 2022	San Bernardino	
Pilar Schiavo	Democratic	December 5, 2022 – present	Los Angeles	

== Election results (1990-present) ==
=== 2024 ===
2024 California State Assembly 40th district election
Primary election
Party	Candidate	Votes	%
Democratic	Pilar Schiavo (incumbent)	54,941	50.2
Republican	Patrick Lee Gipson	54,420	49.8
Total votes		109,361	100.0
General election
Democratic	Pilar Schiavo (incumbent)	119,654	52.8
Republican	Patrick Lee Gipson	106,960	47.2
Total votes		226,614	100.0
Democratic hold			

=== 2022 ===
2022 California State Assembly 40th district election
Primary election
Party	Candidate	Votes	%
Republican	Suzette Martinez Valladares (incumbent)	48,096	47.4
Democratic	Pilar Schiavo	34,415	33.9
Democratic	Annie Cho	18,891	18.6
Total votes		101,402	100.0
General election
Democratic	Pilar Schiavo	79,852	50.2
Republican	Suzette Martinez Valladares (incumbent)	79,330	49.8
Total votes		159,182	100.0
Democratic hold			

=== 2020 ===
2020 California State Assembly 40th district election
Primary election
Party	Candidate	Votes	%
Democratic	James Ramos (incumbent)	54,923	59.4
Republican	Jennifer Tullius	37,590	40.6
Total votes		92,313	100.0
General election
Democratic	James Ramos (incumbent)	111,885	58.4
Republican	Jennifer Tullius	79,821	41.6
Total votes		191,706	100.0
Democratic hold			

=== 2018 ===
2018 California State Assembly 40th district election
Primary election
Party	Candidate	Votes	%
Republican	Henry Gomez Nickel	29,550	45.7
Democratic	James Ramos	26,297	40.7
Democratic	Libbern Gwen Cook	8,777	13.6
Total votes		64,624	100.0
General election
Democratic	James Ramos	77,585	59.5
Republican	Henry Gomez Nickel	52,746	40.5
Total votes		130,331	100.0
Democratic gain from Republican			

=== 2016 ===
2016 California State Assembly 40th district election
Primary election
Party	Candidate	Votes	%
Democratic	Abigail Medina	39,583	51.5
Republican	Marc Steinorth (incumbent)	37,339	48.5
Total votes		76,922	100.0
General election
Republican	Marc Steinorth (incumbent)	76,537	50.6
Democratic	Abigail Medina	74,589	49.4
Total votes		151,126	100.0
Republican hold			

=== 2014 ===
2014 California State Assembly 40th district election
Primary election
Party	Candidate	Votes	%
Republican	Marc Steinorth	20,292	53.9
Democratic	Kathleen Henry	6,416	17.1
Democratic	Melissa O'Donnell	5,835	15.5
Democratic	Arthur Bustamonte	5,085	13.5
Total votes		37,628	100.0
General election
Republican	Marc Steinorth	39,303	55.7
Democratic	Kathleen Henry	31,309	44.3
Total votes		70,612	100.0
Republican hold			

=== 2012 ===
2012 California State Assembly 40th district election
Primary election
Party	Candidate	Votes	%
Republican	Mike Morrell (incumbent)	26,261	58.2
Democratic	Russ Warner	18,862	41.8
Total votes		42,123	100.0
General election
Republican	Mike Morrell (incumbent)	65,282	50.4
Democratic	Russ Warner	64,264	49.6
Total votes		129,546	100.0
Republican gain from Democratic			

=== 2010 ===
2010 California State Assembly 40th district election
Party	Candidate	Votes	%
Democratic	Bob Blumenfield (incumbent)	56,208	61.0
Republican	Dennis Deyoung	36,069	39.0
Total votes		92,277	100.0
Democratic hold			

=== 2008 ===
2008 California State Assembly 40th district election
Party	Candidate	Votes	%
Democratic	Bob Blumenfield	72,360	58.6
Republican	Armineh Chelebian	32,973	26.7
Libertarian	Pamela Brown	18,239	14.8
Total votes		123,572	100.0
Democratic hold			

=== 2006 ===
2006 California State Assembly 40th district election
Party	Candidate	Votes	%
Democratic	Lloyd E. Levine (incumbent)	50,807	63.4
Republican	Rick Montaine	29,325	36.6
Total votes		80,132	100.0
Democratic hold			

=== 2004 ===
2004 California State Assembly 40th district election
Party	Candidate	Votes	%
Democratic	Lloyd E. Levine (incumbent)	69,421	58.0
Republican	Mark Isler	50,323	42.0
Total votes		119,744	100.0
Democratic hold			

=== 2002 ===
2002 California State Assembly 40th district election
Party	Candidate	Votes	%
Democratic	Lloyd E. Levine	44,191	56.5
Republican	Connie Friedman	34,038	43.5
Total votes		78,229	100.0
Democratic hold			

=== 2000 ===
2000 California State Assembly 40th district election
Party	Candidate	Votes	%
Democratic	Bob Hertzberg (incumbent)	70,463	70.2
Republican	Kyle Hammans	22,808	22.7
Libertarian	Kelley L. Ross	7,093	7.1
Total votes		100,364	100.0
Democratic hold			

=== 1998 ===
1998 California State Assembly 40th district election
Party	Candidate	Votes	%
Democratic	Bob Hertzberg (incumbent)	51,145	68.8
Republican	Eunice Deleuw	18,998	25.5
Libertarian	Kelley L. Ross	4,245	5.7
Total votes		74,388	100.0
Democratic hold			

=== 1996 ===
1996 California State Assembly 40th district election
Party	Candidate	Votes	%
Democratic	Bob Hertzberg	51,960	59.0
Republican	H. R. "Ron" Culver	27,248	30.9
Libertarian	Kelley L. Ross	6,985	7.9
Natural Law	David L. Cossak	1,899	2.2
Total votes		88,092	100.0
Democratic hold			

=== 1994 ===
1994 California State Assembly 40th district election
Party	Candidate	Votes	%
Democratic	Barbara Friedman (incumbent)	45,926	57.9
Republican	Noel A. Degaetano	28,764	36.3
Libertarian	Kelley L. Ross	4,607	5.8
Total votes		79,297	100.0
Democratic hold			

=== 1992 ===
1992 California State Assembly 40th district election
Party	Candidate	Votes	%
Democratic	Barbara Friedman (incumbent)	66,597	57.8
Republican	Horace H. Heidt	35,111	30.5
Peace and Freedom	Jean K. Glasser	5,808	5.0
Green	Glenn Bailey	4,093	3.6
Libertarian	John Vernon	3,547	3.1
Total votes		115,156	100.0
Democratic hold			

=== 1990 ===
1990 California State Assembly 40th district election
Party	Candidate	Votes	%
Democratic	Tom Bane (incumbent)	47,215	65.8
Republican	Helen R. Gabriel	20,113	28.0
Libertarian	John Vernon	4,399	6.1
Total votes		71,727	100.0
Democratic hold			

== See also ==
- California State Assembly
- California State Assembly districts
- Districts in California
