= 2022 California State Assembly election =

- November 8, 2022

All 80 seats in the California State Assembly 41 seats needed for a majority
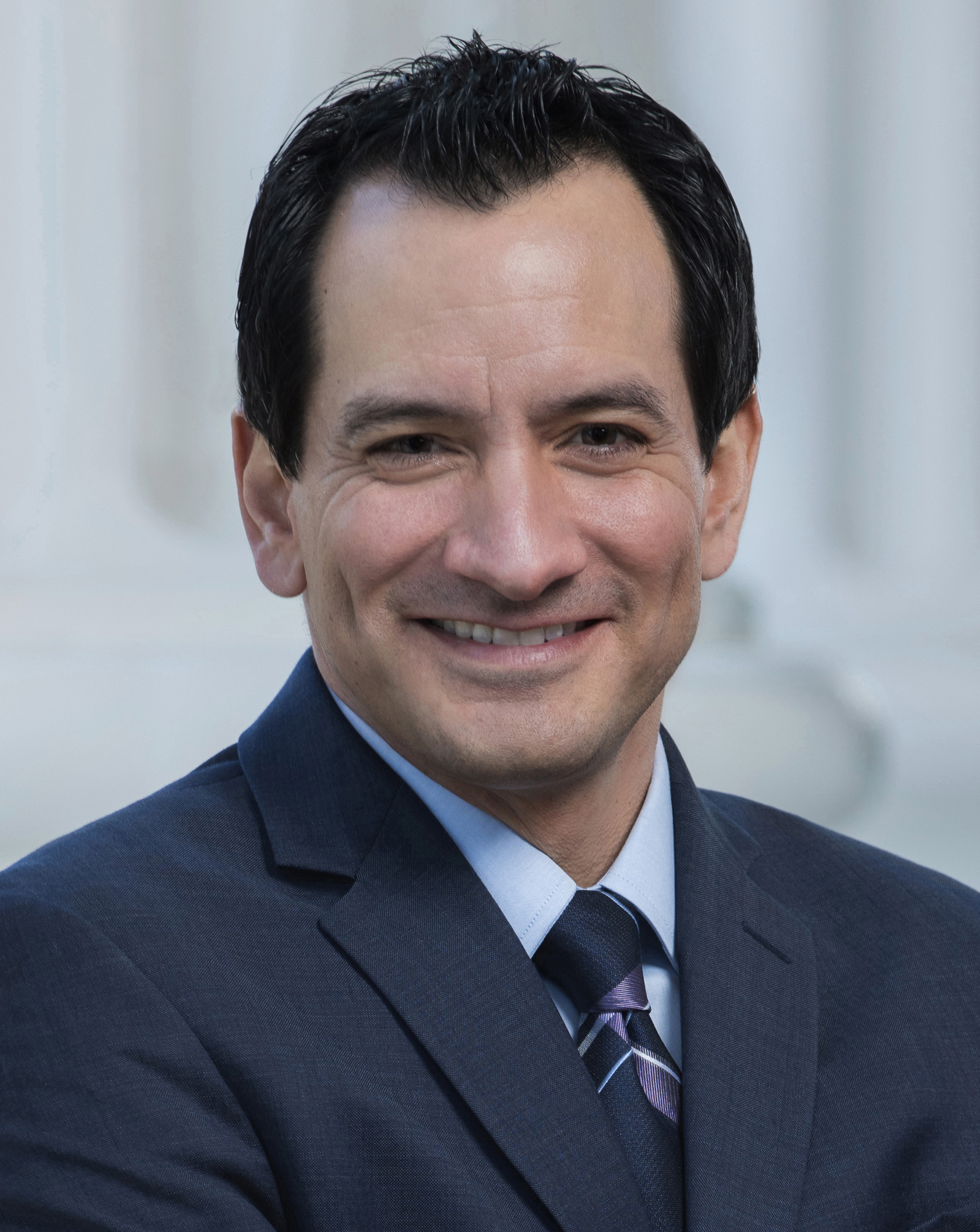

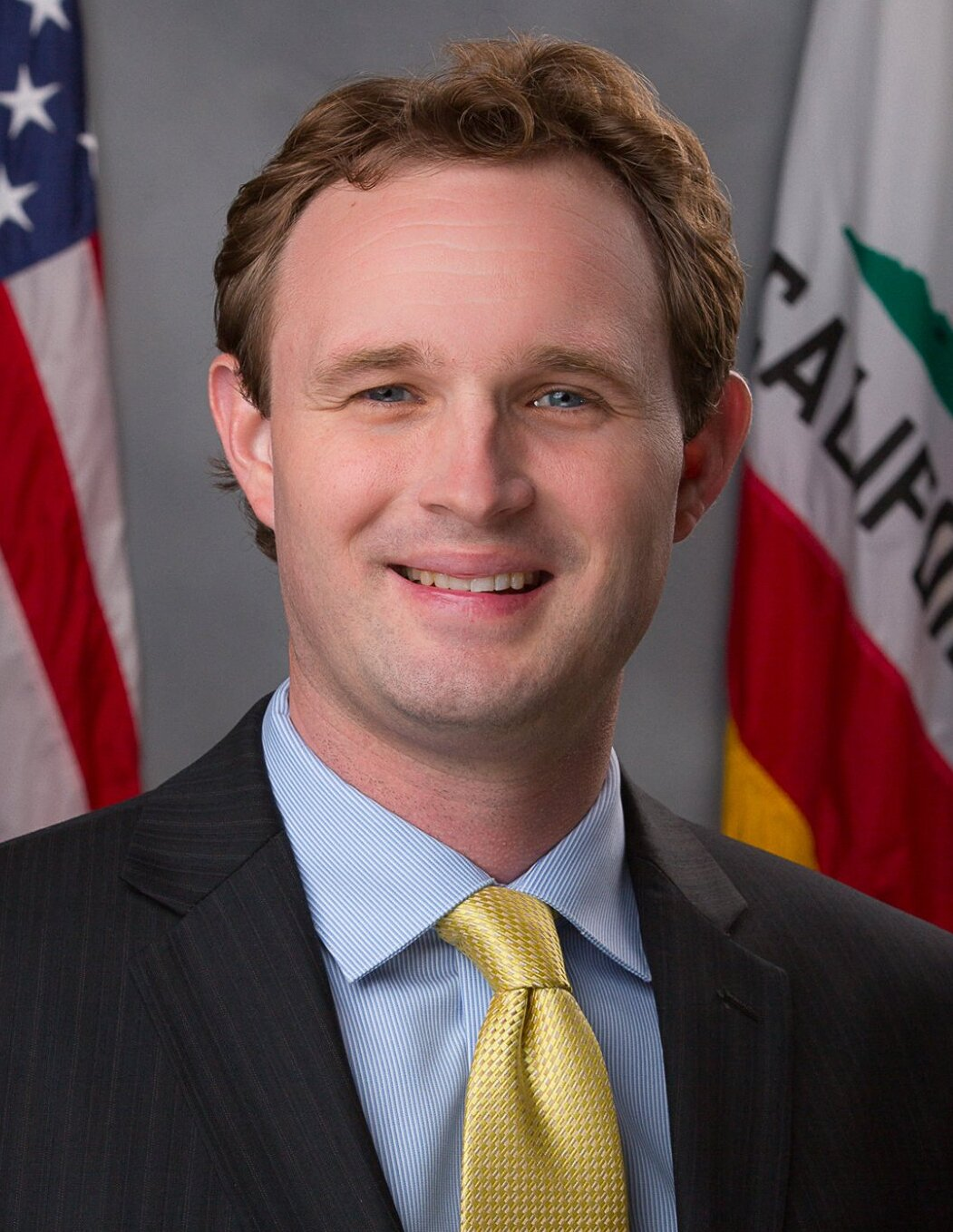
	Majority party	Minority party
Leader	Anthony Rendon	James Gallagher
Party	Democratic	Republican
Leader since	March 7, 2016	February 8, 2022
Leader's seat	62nd–Lakewood (Note: Redistricted from the 63rd district.)	3rd–Yuba City
Last election	60 seats, 62.78%	19 seats, 35.51%
Seats before	60	19
Seats won	62	18
Seat change	▲2	▼1
Popular vote	6,181,972	3,824,294
Percentage	60.86%	37.65%
Swing	▼1.92pp	▲2.14pp
- Democratic gain Republican gain Democratic hold Republican hold Vote share: 50–60% 60–70% 70–80% 80–90% >90% 50–60% 60–70% 70–80% >90%
Speaker before election
Anthony Rendon
Democratic
Elected Speaker
Anthony Rendon (Note: Until June 30th, at which point Robert Rivas will become speaker.)
Democratic

The 2022 California State Assembly election was held on Tuesday, November 8, 2022, with the primary election being held on June 7, 2022. All of the seats of the California State Assembly were elected as part of the 2022 California elections.

Democrats gained two seats, increasing their supermajority to 62 out of 80 seats.

== Predictions ==
Source	Ranking	As of
Sabato's Crystal Ball	Safe D	May 19, 2022

== Overview ==
=== Primary ===
2022 California State Assembly election Primary election – June 7, 2022
Party	Votes	Percentage	Candidates	Advancing to general	Seats contesting
Democratic	3,936,102	61.26	130	88	74
Republican	2,444,344	38.04	94	67	64
No party preference	37,071	0.58	4	2	2
Peace and Freedom	2,898	<0.1	1	0	0
Libertarian	3,518	<0.1	2	1	1
Green	1,620	<0.1	1	0	0
Totals	6,425,553	100.00	232	158	—

=== Election ===
2022 California State Assembly election General election — November 8, 2022
Party	Votes	Percentage	Seats	+/–
Democratic	6,181,972	60.86	62	▲2
Republican	3,824,294	37.65	18	▼1
Libertarian	43,815	0.43	0	Steady
Independents	107,031	1.05	0	▼1
Valid votes	10,157,112	—	—	—
Invalid votes	—	—	—	—
Totals	10,157,112	100	80	—
Registered voter/turnout	21,940,274	46.29		

=== Summary of results by State Assembly district ===
† - Incumbent not seeking re-election

Assembly district	Incumbent	Party	Elected Assemblymember	Party
1st	Megan Dahle	Rep	Megan Dahle	Rep
2nd	Jim Wood	Dem	Jim Wood	Dem
3rd	James Gallagher	Rep	James Gallagher	Rep
4th	Cecilia Aguiar-Curry	Dem	Cecilia Aguiar-Curry	Dem
5th	Kevin Kiley† (Note: Redistricted from the 6th district.)	Rep	Joe Patterson	Rep
6th	Kevin McCarty (Note: Redistricted from the 7th district.)	Dem	Kevin McCarty	Dem
7th	Ken Cooley (Note: Redistricted from the 8th district.)	Dem	Josh Hoover	Rep
8th	Jim Patterson (Note: Redistricted from the 23rd district.)	Rep	Jim Patterson	Rep
8th	Frank Bigelow† (Note: Redistricted from the 5th district.)	Rep	Jim Patterson	Rep
9th	Heath Flora (Note: Redistricted from the 12th district.)	Rep	Heath Flora	Rep
10th	Jim Cooper† (Note: Redistricted from the 9th district.)	Dem	Stephanie Nguyen	Dem
11th	Lori Wilson	Dem	Lori Wilson	Dem
12th	Marc Levine† (Note: Redistricted from the 10th district.)	Dem	Damon Connolly	Dem
13th	Carlos Villapudua	Dem	Carlos Villapudua	Dem
14th	Buffy Wicks (Note: Redistricted from the 15th district.)	Dem	Buffy Wicks	Dem
15th	Tim Grayson (Note: Redistricted from the 14th district.)	Dem	Tim Grayson	Dem
16th	Rebecca Bauer-Kahan	Dem	Rebecca Bauer-Kahan	Dem
17th	Matt Haney	Dem	Matt Haney	Dem
18th	Mia Bonta	Dem	Mia Bonta	Dem
19th	Phil Ting	Dem	Phil Ting	Dem
20th	Bill Quirk†	Dem	Liz Ortega	Dem
21st	Kevin Mullin† (Note: Redistricted from the 22nd district.)	Dem	Diane Papan	Dem
22nd	New Seat		Juan Alanis	Rep
23rd	Marc Berman (Note: Redistricted from the 24th district.)	Dem	Marc Berman	Dem
24th	Alex Lee (Note: Redistricted from the 25th district.)	Dem	Alex Lee	Dem
25th	Ash Kalra (Note: Redistricted from the 27th district.)	Dem	Ash Kalra	Dem
26th	Evan Low (Note: Redistricted from the 28th district.)	Dem	Evan Low	Dem
27th	Adam Gray† (Note: Redistricted from the 21st district.)	Dem	Esmeralda Soria	Dem
28th	Mark Stone† (Note: Redistricted from the 29th district.)	Dem	Gail Pellerin	Dem
29th	Robert Rivas (Note: Redistricted from the 30th district.)	Dem	Robert Rivas	Dem
30th	Jordan Cunningham† (Note: Redistricted from the 35th district.)	Rep	Dawn Addis	Dem
31st	Joaquin Arambula	Dem	Joaquin Arambula	Dem
32nd	Vince Fong (Note: Redistricted from the 34th district.)	Rep	Vince Fong	Rep
33rd	Devon Mathis (Note: Redistricted from the 26th district.)	Rep	Devon Mathis	Rep
34th	Tom Lackey (Note: Redistricted from the 36th district.)	Rep	Tom Lackey	Rep
34th	Thurston Smith (Note: Redistricted from the 33rd district.)	Rep	Tom Lackey	Rep
35th	Rudy Salas† (Note: Redistricted from the 32nd district.)	Dem	Jasmeet Bains	Dem
36th	Eduardo Garcia (Note: Redistricted from the 56th district.)	Dem	Eduardo Garcia	Dem
37th	New Seat		Gregg Hart	Dem
38th	Steve Bennett (Note: Redistricted from the 37th district.)	Dem	Steve Bennett	Dem
39th	New Seat		Juan Carrillo	Dem
40th	Suzette Martinez Valladares (Note: Redistricted from the 38th district.)	Rep	Pilar Schiavo	Dem
41st	Chris Holden	Dem	Chris Holden	Dem
42nd	Jacqui Irwin (Note: Redistricted from the 44th district.)	Dem	Jacqui Irwin	Dem
43rd	Luz Rivas (Note: Redistricted from the 39th district.)	Dem	Luz Rivas	Dem
44th	Laura Friedman (Note: Redistricted from the 43rd district.)	Dem	Laura Friedman	Dem
44th	Adrin Nazarian† (Note: Redistricted from the 46th district.)	Dem	Laura Friedman	Dem
45th	James Ramos (Note: Redistricted from the 40th district.)	Dem	James Ramos	Dem
46th	Jesse Gabriel (Note: Redistricted from the 45th district.)	Dem	Jesse Gabriel	Dem
47th	Chad Mayes† (Note: Redistricted from the 42nd district.)	Ind	Greg Wallis	Rep
48th	Blanca Rubio	Dem	Blanca Rubio	Dem
49th	Mike Fong	Dem	Mike Fong	Dem
50th	Eloise Reyes (Note: Redistricted from the 47th district.)	Dem	Eloise Reyes	Dem
51st	Richard Bloom† (Note: Redistricted from the 50th district.)	Dem	Rick Zbur	Dem
52nd	Wendy Carrillo (Note: Redistricted from the 51st district.)	Dem	Wendy Carrillo	Dem
53rd	Freddie Rodriguez (Note: Redistricted from the 52nd district.)	Dem	Freddie Rodriguez	Dem
54th	Miguel Santiago (Note: Redistricted from the 53rd district.)	Dem	Miguel Santiago	Dem
55th	Isaac Bryan (Note: Redistricted from the 54th district.)	Dem	Isaac Bryan	Dem
56th	Lisa Calderon (Note: Redistricted from the 57th district.)	Dem	Lisa Calderon	Dem
57th	Reggie Jones-Sawyer (Note: Redistricted from the 59th district.)	Dem	Reggie Jones-Sawyer	Dem
58th	Sabrina Cervantes (Note: Redistricted from the 60th district.)	Dem	Sabrina Cervantes	Dem
58th	Jose Medina† (Note: Redistricted from the 61st district.)	Dem	Sabrina Cervantes	Dem
59th	Phillip Chen (Note: Redistricted from the 55th district.)	Rep	Phillip Chen	Rep
60th	New Seat		Corey Jackson	Dem
61st	Tina McKinnor (Note: Redistricted from the 62nd district.)	Dem	Tina McKinnor	Dem
62nd	Anthony Rendon (Note: Redistricted from the 63rd district.)	Dem	Anthony Rendon	Dem
63rd	New Seat		Bill Essayli	Rep
64th	Cristina Garcia† (Note: Redistricted from the 58th district.)	Dem	Blanca Pacheco	Dem
65th	Mike Gipson (Note: Redistricted from the 64th district.)	Dem	Mike Gipson	Dem
66th	Al Muratsuchi	Dem	Al Muratsuchi	Dem
67th	Sharon Quirk-Silva (Note: Redistricted from the 65th district.)	Dem	Sharon Quirk-Silva	Dem
68th	Tom Daly† (Note: Redistricted from the 69th district.)	Dem	Avelino Valencia	Dem
69th	Patrick O'Donnell† (Note: Redistricted from the 70th district.)	Dem	Josh Lowenthal	Dem
70th	New Seat		Tri Ta	Rep
71st	Kelly Seyarto† (Note: Redistricted from the 67th district.)	Rep	Kate Sanchez	Rep
72nd	Janet Nguyen	Rep	Diane Dixon	Rep
73rd	Cottie Petrie-Norris (Note: Redistricted from the 74th district.)	Dem	Cottie Petrie-Norris	Dem
73rd	Steven Choi (Note: Redistricted from the 68th district.)	Rep	Cottie Petrie-Norris	Dem
74th	Laurie Davies (Note: Redistricted from the 73rd district.)	Rep	Laurie Davies	Rep
75th	Marie Waldron	Rep	Marie Waldron	Rep
75th	Randy Voepel (Note: Redistricted from the 71st district.)	Rep	Marie Waldron	Rep
76th	Brian Maienschein (Note: Redistricted from the 77th district.)	Dem	Brian Maienschein	Dem
77th	Tasha Boerner Horvath (Note: Redistricted from the 76th district.)	Dem	Tasha Boerner Horvath	Dem
78th	Chris Ward	Dem	Chris Ward	Dem
79th	Akilah Weber	Dem	Akilah Weber	Dem
80th	David Alvarez	Dem	David Alvarez	Dem

== Retiring incumbents ==
- 5th: Frank Bigelow: (R-Madera): Retiring
- 6th: Kevin Kiley (R-Rocklin): Retiring to run for the United States House of Representatives
- 9th: Jim Cooper (D-Elk Grove): Retiring to run for Sacramento County Sheriff
- 10th: Marc Levine (D-San Rafael): Retiring to run for state Insurance Commissioner
- 20th: Bill Quirk (D–Hayward): Retiring
- 21st: Adam Gray (D–Merced): Retiring to run for U.S. House of Representatives
- 22nd: Kevin Mullin (D–South San Francisco): Retiring to run for U.S. House of Representatives
- 29th: Mark Stone (D–Scotts Valley): Retiring
- 32nd: Rudy Salas (D–Bakersfield): Retiring to run for U.S. House of Representatives
- 35th: Jordan Cunningham (R–Paso Robles): Retiring
- 42nd: Chad Mayes (I-Rancho Mirage): Retiring
- 58th: Cristina Garcia (D-Bell Gardens): Running for the United States House of Representatives
- 61st: Jose Medina (D-Riverside) Retiring
- 67th: Kelly Seyarto (R-Murrieta): Retiring to run for the California State Senate
- 69th: Tom Daly (D-Santa Ana): Retiring
- 70th: Patrick O'Donnell (D-Long Beach): Retiring
- 72nd: Janet Nguyen (R-Huntington Beach): Retiring to run for the California State Senate

== District 1 ==
2022 California's 1st State Assembly district election
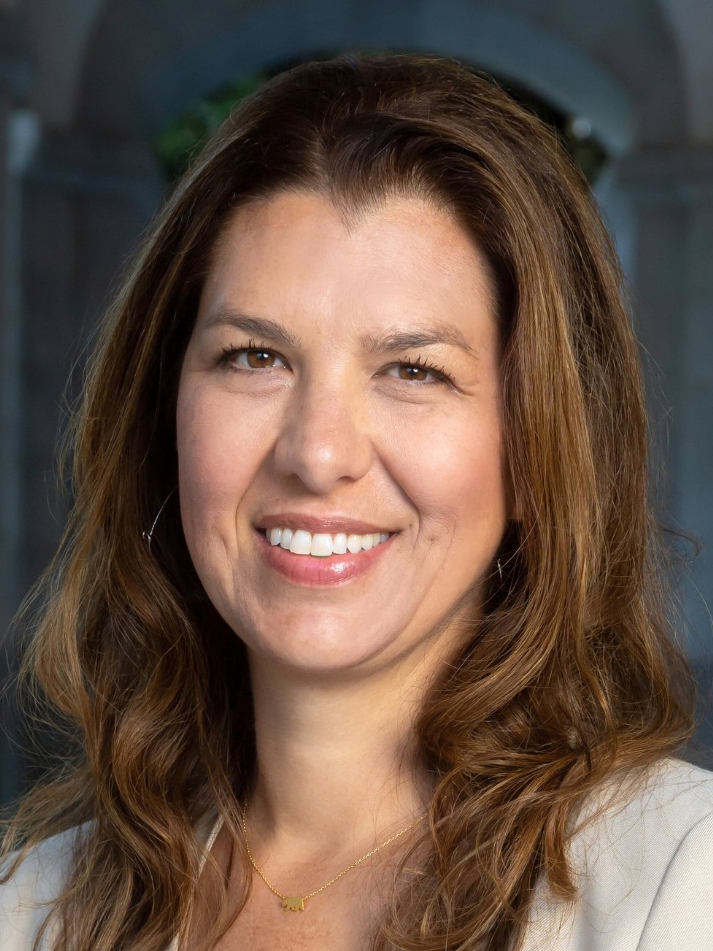

Candidate	Megan Dahle	Belle Starr Sandwith
Party	Republican	Democratic
Popular vote	129,527	79,068
Percentage	62.1%	37.9%
State assemblymember before election
Megan Dahle
Republican
Elected State assemblymember
Megan Dahle
Republican

2022 California's 1st State Assembly district election
Primary election
Party	Candidate	Votes	%
Republican	Megan Dahle (incumbent)	79,201	52.5
Democratic	Belle Starr Sandwith	51,237	34.0
Republican	Kelly Tanner	17,577	11.6
Peace and Freedom	Joshua Brown	2,898	1.9
Total votes		150,913	100%
General election
Republican	Megan Dahle (incumbent)	129,527	62.1
Democratic	Belle Starr Sandwith	79,068	37.9
Total votes		208,595	100%
Republican hold			

== District 2 ==
2022 California's 2nd State Assembly district election
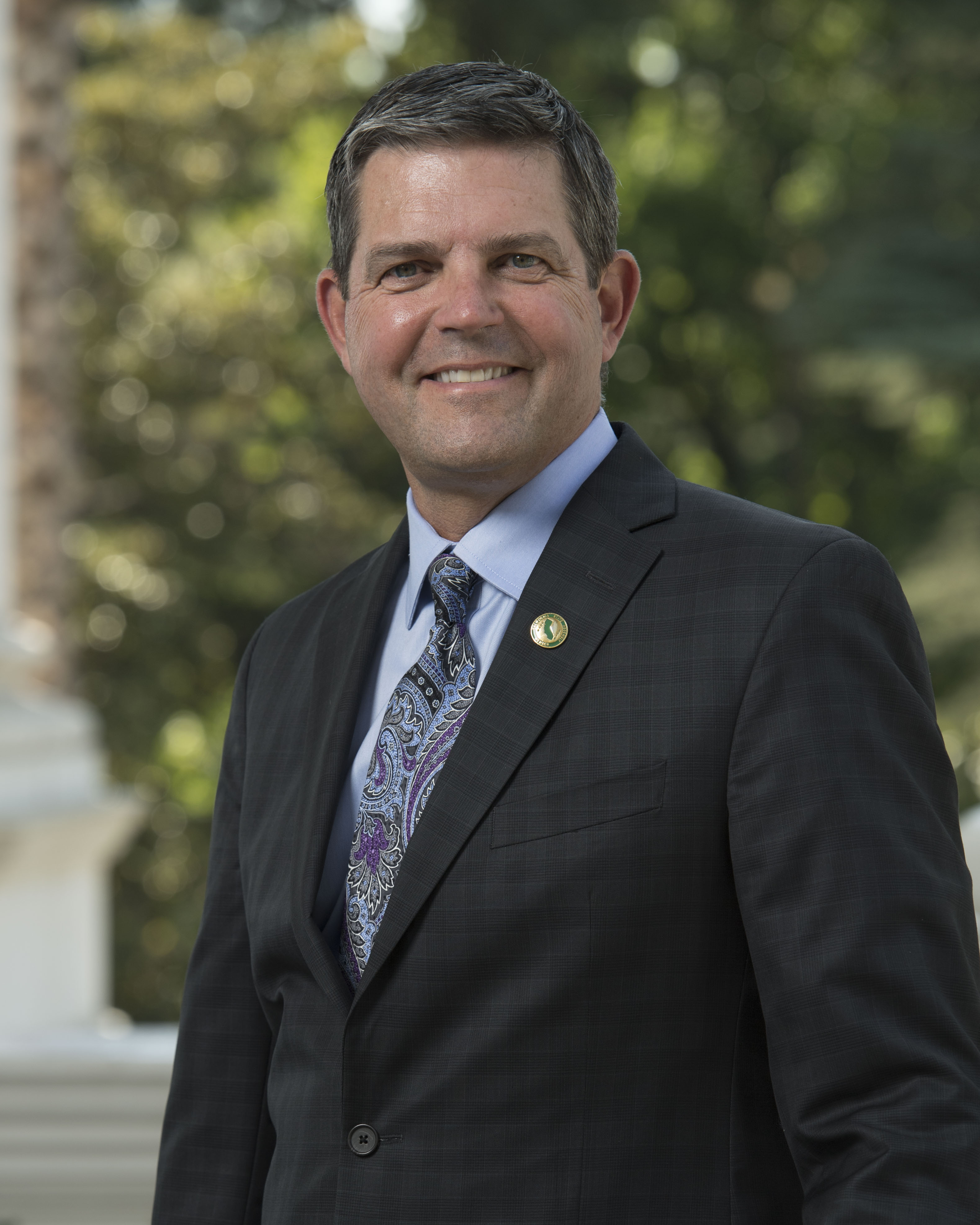

	Majority party	Minority party
Candidate	Jim Wood	Charlotte Svolos
Party	Democratic	Republican
Popular vote	129,356	58,330
Percentage	68.9%	31.1%
State assemblymember before election
Jim Wood
Democratic
Elected State assemblymember
Jim Wood
Democratic

2022 California's 2nd State Assembly district election
Primary election
Party	Candidate	Votes	%
Democratic	Jim Wood (incumbent)	92,411	71.1
Republican	Charlotte Svolos	37,636	28.9
Total votes		130,047	100%
General election
Democratic	Jim Wood (incumbent)	129,356	68.9
Republican	Charlotte Svolos	58,330	31.1
Total votes		187,686	100%
Democratic hold			

== District 3 ==
2022 California's 3rd State Assembly district election
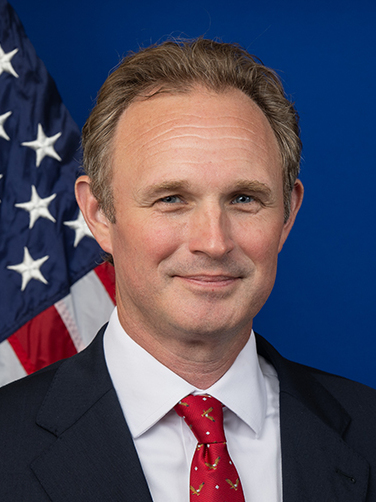

Candidate	James Gallagher	David Leon Zink
Party	Republican	Democratic
Popular vote	98,475	52,198
Percentage	65.4%	34.6%
State assemblymember before election
James Gallagher
Republican
Elected State assemblymember
James Gallagher
Republican

2022 California's 3rd State Assembly district election
Primary election
Party	Candidate	Votes	%
Republican	James Gallagher (incumbent)	65,115	66.0
Democratic	David Leon Zink	33,513	34.0
Democratic	Jeanenne H. Hoston (write-in)	41	0.0
Total votes		98,669	100%
General election
Republican	James Gallagher (incumbent)	98,475	65.4
Democratic	David Leon Zink	52,198	34.6
Total votes		150,673	100%
Republican hold			

== District 4 ==
2022 California's 4th State Assembly district election
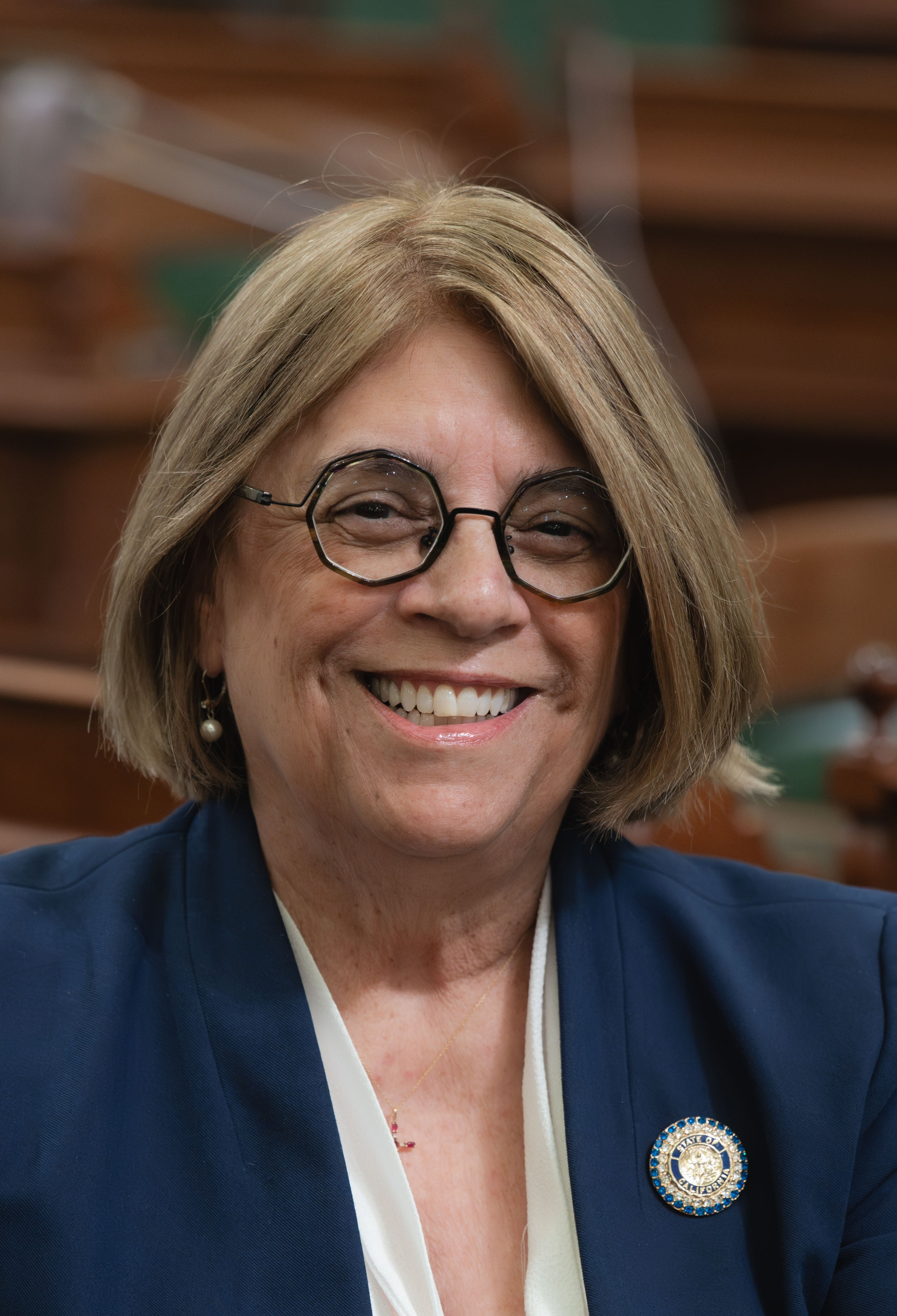

Candidate	Cecilia Aguiar-Curry	Bryan Pritchard
Party	Democratic	Republican
Popular vote	99,342	53,734
Percentage	64.9%	35.1%
State assemblymember before election
Cecilia Aguiar-Curry
Democratic
Elected State assemblymember
Cecilia Aguiar-Curry
Democratic

2022 California's 4th State Assembly district election
Primary election
Party	Candidate	Votes	%
Democratic	Cecilia Aguiar-Curry (incumbent)	70,593	67.1
Republican	Bryan Pritchard	34,532	32.8
No party preference	Susan G. Pelican (write-in)	36	0.0
Total votes		105,161	100%
General election
Democratic	Cecilia Aguiar-Curry (incumbent)	99,342	64.9
Republican	Bryan Pritchard	53,734	35.1
Total votes		153,076	100%
Democratic hold			

== District 5 ==
2022 California's 5th State Assembly district election
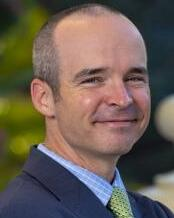

Candidate	Joe Patterson	Rebecca L. Chenoweth
Party	Republican	Democratic
Popular vote	134,729	89,245
Percentage	60.2%	39.8%
State assemblymember before election
Kevin Kiley
Republican
Elected State assemblymember
Joe Patterson
Republican

2022 California's 5th State Assembly district election
Primary election
Party	Candidate	Votes	%
Democratic	Rebecca L. Chenoweth	58,856	38.6
Republican	Joe Patterson	56,923	37.3
Republican	Jason Paletta	27,930	18.3
Republican	Greg Smith	8,895	5.8
Total votes		152,604	100%
General election
Republican	Joe Patterson	134,729	60.2
Democratic	Rebecca L. Chenoweth	89,245	39.8
Total votes		223,974	100%
Republican hold			

== District 6 ==
2022 California's 6th State Assembly district election
Primary election
Party	Candidate	Votes	%
Democratic	Kevin McCarty (incumbent)	57,740	55.4
Republican	Cathy Cook	21,522	20.6
Democratic	Josh Pane	15,709	15.1
Republican	Bob Marques	7,340	7.0
Libertarian	Janice Marlae Bonser	1,931	1.9
Total votes		104,242	100%
General election
Democratic	Kevin McCarty (incumbent)	98,656	65.6
Republican	Cathy Cook	51,823	34.4
Total votes		150,479	100%
Democratic hold			

== District 7 ==
2022 California's 7th State Assembly district election
Primary election
Party	Candidate	Votes	%
Democratic	Ken Cooley (incumbent)	56,949	50.9
Republican	Josh Hoover	38,001	34.0
Republican	Raymond Riehle	9,429	8.4
Republican	Jeffrey Erik Perrine	6,214	5.6
Republican	Quintin Toshi Levesque	1,249	1.1
Total votes		111,842	100%
General election
Republican	Josh Hoover	83,768	50.4
Democratic	Ken Cooley (incumbent)	82,385	49.6
Total votes		166,153	100%
Republican gain from Democratic			

== District 8 ==
2022 California's 8th State Assembly district election
Primary election
Party	Candidate	Votes	%
Republican	Jim Patterson (incumbent)	91,237	100%
Libertarian	Thomas Edward Nichols (write-in)	15	0.0
Total votes		91,252	100%
General election
Republican	Jim Patterson (incumbent)	128,124	74.2
Libertarian	Thomas Edward Nichols	44,451	25.8
Total votes		172,575	100%
Republican hold			

== District 9 ==
2022 California's 9th State Assembly district election
Primary election
Party	Candidate	Votes	%
Republican	Heath Flora (incumbent)	65,647	99.8
Democratic	Mushtaq A. Tahirkheli (write-in)	142	0.2
Total votes		65,789	100%
General election
Republican	Heath Flora (incumbent)	96,990	69.2
Democratic	Mushtaq A. Tahirkheli	43,109	30.8
Total votes		140,099	100%
Republican hold			

== District 10 ==
2022 California's 10th State Assembly district election
Primary election
Party	Candidate	Votes	%
Democratic	Stephanie Nguyen	26,652	29.9
Democratic	Eric Guerra	26,193	29.4
Republican	Eric M. Rigard	24,293	27.3
Democratic	Tecoy Porter	7,632	8.6
Democratic	Ben Thompkins	4,291	4.8
Total votes		89,061	100%
General election
Democratic	Stephanie Nguyen	63,570	53.8
Democratic	Eric Guerra	54,595	46.2
Total votes		118,165	100%
Democratic hold			

== District 11 ==
2022 California's 11th State Assembly district election
Primary election
Party	Candidate	Votes	%
Democratic	Lori Wilson (incumbent)	52,139	64.2
No party preference	Jenny Leilani Callison	28,992	35.7
No party preference	James Berg (write-in)	23	0.0
Total votes		81,154	100%
General election
Democratic	Lori Wilson (incumbent)	85,599	59.2
No party preference	Jenny Leilani Callison	58,889	40.8
Total votes		144,488	100%
Democratic hold			

== District 12 ==
2022 California's 12th State Assembly district election
Primary election
Party	Candidate	Votes	%
Democratic	Damon Connolly	42,950	37.1
Democratic	Sara Aminzadeh	41,934	36.2
Democratic	Steve Schwartz	16,612	14.3
Democratic	Ida Times-Green	13,164	11.4
Republican	Andrew Alan Podshadley (write-in)	1,181	1.0
Total votes		115,841	100%
General election
Democratic	Damon Connolly	92,287	51.8
Democratic	Sara Aminzadeh	85,900	48.2
Total votes		178,187	100%
Democratic hold			

== District 13 ==
2022 California's 13th State Assembly district election
Primary election
Party	Candidate	Votes	%
Democratic	Carlos Villapudua (incumbent)	28,099	59.1
Democratic	Veronica Vargas	12,598	26.5
Democratic	Mateo Bedolla	6,643	14.0
Republican	Jessica Wagner (write-in)	222	0.5
Total votes		47,562	100%
General election
Democratic	Carlos Villapudua (incumbent)	51,891	60.6
Democratic	Veronica Vargas	33,673	39.4
Total votes		85,564	100%
Democratic hold			

== District 14 ==
2022 California's 14th State Assembly district election
Primary election
Party	Candidate	Votes	%
Democratic	Buffy Wicks (incumbent)	85,180	100%
Republican	Richard Kinney (write-in)	37	0.0
Total votes		84,619	100%
General election
Democratic	Buffy Wicks (incumbent)	139,331	88.4
Republican	Richard Kinney	18,242	11.6
Total votes		157,573	100%
Democratic hold			

== District 15 ==
2022 California's 15th State Assembly district election
Primary election
Party	Candidate	Votes	%
Democratic	Tim Grayson (incumbent)	61,742	68.4
Republican	Janell Elizabeth Proctor	28,501	31.6
Total votes		90,243	100%
General election
Democratic	Tim Grayson (incumbent)	100,712	67.3
Republican	Janell Elizabeth Proctor	48,911	32.7
Total votes		149,623	100%
Democratic hold			

== District 16 ==
2022 California's 16th State Assembly district election
Primary election
Party	Candidate	Votes	%
Democratic	Rebecca Bauer-Kahan (incumbent)	80,054	66.6
Republican	Joseph A. Rubay	40,203	33.4
Total votes		120,257	100%
General election
Democratic	Rebecca Bauer-Kahan (incumbent)	130,813	65.7
Republican	Joseph A. Rubay	68,149	34.3
Total votes		198,962	100%
Democratic hold			

== District 17 ==
2022 California's 17th State Assembly district election
Primary election
Party	Candidate	Votes	%
Democratic	Matt Haney (incumbent)	69,412	63.2
Democratic	David Campos	27,270	24.8
Republican	Bill Shireman	13,071	11.9
Total votes		109,753	100%
General election
Democratic	Matt Haney (incumbent)	101,891	69.1
Democratic	David Campos	45,470	30.9
Total votes		147,361	100%
Democratic hold			

== District 18 ==
2022 California's 18th State Assembly district election
Primary election
Party	Candidate	Votes	%
Democratic	Mia Bonta (incumbent)	69,142	100%
Republican	Mindy Pechenuk (write-in)	31	0.0
Total votes		69,173	100%
General election
Democratic	Mia Bonta (incumbent)	120,863	89.9
Republican	Mindy Pechenuk	13,504	10.1
Total votes		134,367	100%
Democratic hold			

== District 19 ==
2022 California's 19th State Assembly district election
Primary election
Party	Candidate	Votes	%
Democratic	Phil Ting (incumbent)	89,910	80.0
Republican	Karsten Weide	22,509	20.0
Total votes		112,419	100%
General election
Democratic	Phil Ting (incumbent)	133,316	81.0
Republican	Karsten Weide	31,252	19.0
Total votes		164,568	100%
Democratic hold			

== District 20 ==
2022 California's 20th State Assembly district election
Primary election
Party	Candidate	Votes	%
Democratic	Liz Ortega	23,503	32.2
Democratic	Shawn Kumagai	17,481	23.9
Democratic	Jennifer Esteen	16,211	22.2
Republican	Joseph Grcar	15,869	21.7
Total votes		73,064	100%
General election
Democratic	Liz Ortega	68,853	62.2
Democratic	Shawn Kumagai	41,917	37.8
Total votes		110,770	100%
Democratic hold			

== District 21 ==
2022 California's 21st State Assembly district election
Primary election
Party	Candidate	Votes	%
Democratic	Diane Papan	40,434	41.3
Democratic	Giselle Hale	19,400	19.8
Republican	Mark Gilham	19,078	19.5
Democratic	James H. Coleman	11,269	11.5
Democratic	Alison M. Madden	3,359	3.4
Democratic	Maurice Goodman	2,664	2.7
Green	Tania Solé	1,620	1.7
Total votes		97,824	100%
General election
Democratic	Diane Papan	94,676	72.4
Democratic	Giselle Hale (withdrawn)	36,014	27.6
Total votes		130,690	100%
Democratic hold			

== District 22 ==
2022 California's 22nd State Assembly district election
Primary election
Party	Candidate	Votes	%
Republican	Juan Alanis	23,453	36.5
Democratic	Jessica Self	17,315	27.0
Democratic	Chad M. Condit	13,015	20.3
Republican	Joel Gutierrez Campos	8,160	12.7
Republican	Lupita Salazar	2,250	3.5
Total votes		64,193	100%
General election
Republican	Juan Alanis	60,338	58.1
Democratic	Jessica Self	43,526	41.9
Total votes		103,864	100%
Republican win (new seat)			

== District 23 ==
2022 California's 23rd State Assembly district election
Primary election
Party	Candidate	Votes	%
Democratic	Marc Berman (incumbent)	83,533	76.3
Republican	Tim Dec	26,002	23.7
Total votes		109,535	100%
General election
Democratic	Marc Berman (incumbent)	124,602	73.4
Republican	Tim Dec	45,149	26.6
Total votes		169,751	100%
Democratic hold			

== District 24 ==
2022 California's 24th State Assembly district election
Primary election
Party	Candidate	Votes	%
Democratic	Alex Lee (incumbent)	26,531	38.5
Republican	Bob Brunton	14,730	21.4
Democratic	Kansen Chu	12,683	18.4
Democratic	Teresa Keng	9,721	14.1
Democratic	Lan Diep	5,308	7.7
Total votes		68,973	100%
General election
Democratic	Alex Lee (incumbent)	75,232	69.1
Republican	Bob Brunton	33,662	30.9
Total votes		108,894	100%
Democratic hold			

== District 25 ==
2022 California's 25th State Assembly district election
Primary election
Party	Candidate	Votes	%
Democratic	Ash Kalra (incumbent)	47,942	71.5
Republican	Ted Stroll	19,123	28.5
Total votes		67,065	100%
General election
Democratic	Ash Kalra (incumbent)	74,546	70.0
Republican	Ted Stroll	31,893	30.0
Total votes		106,439	100%
Democratic hold			

== District 26 ==
2022 California's 26th State Assembly district election
Primary election
Party	Candidate	Votes	%
Democratic	Evan Low (incumbent)	45,916	66.9
Republican	Tim Gorsulowsky	16,289	23.7
Democratic	Long Jiao	6,434	9.4
Total votes		68,639	100%
General election
Democratic	Evan Low (incumbent)	81,595	74.0
Republican	Tim Gorsulowsky	28,616	26.0
Total votes		110,211	100%
Democratic hold			

== District 27 ==
2022 California's 27th State Assembly district election
Primary election
Party	Candidate	Votes	%
Democratic	Esmeralda Soria	20,395	40.1
Republican	Mark Nicholas Pazin	17,801	35.0
Republican	Amanda Fleming	8,541	16.8
Democratic	Mike Karbassi	4,107	8.1
Libertarian	Randall Pellissier (write-in)	4	0.0
Total votes		50,848	100%
General election
Democratic	Esmeralda Soria	45,721	51.3
Republican	Mark Nicholas Pazin	43,335	48.7
Total votes		89,056	100%
Democratic hold			

== District 28 ==
2022 California's 28th State Assembly district election
Primary election
Party	Candidate	Votes	%
Democratic	Gail Pellerin	41,575	35.9
Republican	Liz Lawler	34,065	29.4
Democratic	Rob Rennie	28,592	24.7
Democratic	Joe Thompson	11,664	10.1
Total votes		115,896	100%
General election
Democratic	Gail Pellerin	121,119	68.0
Republican	Liz Lawler	56,917	32.0
Total votes		178,036	100%
Democratic hold			

== District 29 ==
2022 California's 29th State Assembly district election
Primary election
Party	Candidate	Votes	%
Democratic	Robert Rivas (incumbent)	38,163	64.3
Republican	Stephanie L. Castro	21,148	35.7
Total votes		59,311	100%
General election
Democratic	Robert Rivas (incumbent)	63,439	63.8
Republican	Stephanie L. Castro	36,030	36.2
Total votes		99,469	100%
Democratic hold			

== District 30 ==
2022 California's 30th State Assembly district election
Primary election
Party	Candidate	Votes	%
Democratic	Dawn Addis	54,924	40.8
Republican	Vicki Nohrden	49,287	36.6
Democratic	Jon Wizard	14,090	10.5
Democratic	Zoë G. Carter	11,584	8.6
Democratic	John R. Drake	4,695	3.5
Total votes		134,580	100%
General election
Democratic	Dawn Addis	115,770	60.0
Republican	Vicki Nohrden	77,079	40.0
Total votes		192,849	100%
Democratic gain from Republican			

== District 31 ==
2022 California's 31st State Assembly district election
Primary election
Party	Candidate	Votes	%
Democratic	Joaquin Arambula (incumbent)	23,629	55.5
Republican	Dolce Misol Calandra	13,858	32.6
Democratic	John Mendoza	3,242	7.6
No party preference	Andrew Verhines	1,842	4.3
Total votes		42,571	100%
General election
Democratic	Joaquin Arambula (incumbent)	44,255	60.8
Republican	Dolce Misol Calandra	28,557	39.2
Total votes		72,812	100%
Democratic hold			

== District 32 ==
2022 California's 32nd State Assembly district election
Primary election
Party	Candidate	Votes	%
Republican	Vince Fong (incumbent)	77,776	100%
Total votes		77,776	100%
General election
Republican	Vince Fong (incumbent)	129,326	100%
Total votes		129,326	100%
Republican hold			

== District 33 ==
2022 California's 33rd State Assembly district election
Primary election
Party	Candidate	Votes	%
Republican	Devon Mathis (incumbent)	30,987	64.8
Democratic	Jose Sigala	9,528	19.9
Democratic	Ruben Macareno	7,272	15.2
Total votes		47,787	100%
General election
Republican	Devon Mathis (incumbent)	52,436	62.5
Democratic	Jose Sigala	31,486	37.5
Total votes		83,922	100%
Republican hold			

== District 34 ==
2022 California's 34th State Assembly district election
Primary election
Party	Candidate	Votes	%
Republican	Thurston Smith (incumbent)	23,663	31.1
Republican	Tom Lackey (incumbent)	22,622	29.7
Democratic	Rita Ramirez Dean	20,384	26.8
Democratic	Raj Kahlon	4,063	5.3
Republican	Paul Fournier	3,189	4.2
No party preference	Roger LaPlante	2,122	2.8
Total votes		76,043	100%
General election
Republican	Tom Lackey (incumbent)	63,840	56.5
Republican	Thurston Smith (incumbent)	49,183	43.5
Total votes		113,023	100%
Republican hold			

== District 35 ==
2022 California's 35th State Assembly district election
Primary election
Party	Candidate	Votes	%
Democratic	Leticia Perez	14,101	50.5
Democratic	Jasmeet Bains	13,812	49.5
Total votes		27,913	100%
General election
Democratic	Jasmeet Bains	35,998	60.3
Democratic	Leticia Perez	23,709	39.7
Total votes		59,707	100%
Democratic hold			

== District 36 ==
2022 California's 36th State Assembly district election
Primary election
Party	Candidate	Votes	%
Democratic	Eduardo Garcia (incumbent)	27,970	48.0
Republican	Ian M. Weeks	25,584	43.9
Democratic	Marlon G. Ware	4,728	8.1
Total votes		58,282	100%
General election
Democratic	Eduardo Garcia (incumbent)	50,482	53.4
Republican	Ian M. Weeks	44,055	46.6
Total votes		94,537	100%
Democratic hold			

== District 37 ==
2022 California's 37th State Assembly district election
Primary election
Party	Candidate	Votes	%
Democratic	Gregg Hart	54,923	56.1
Republican	Mike Stoker	39,815	40.6
Democratic	Bruce Wallach	3,241	3.3
Total votes		97,979	100%
General election
Democratic	Gregg Hart	84,345	58.0
Republican	Mike Stoker	60,959	42.0
Total votes		145,304	100%
Democratic win (new seat)			

== District 38 ==
2022 California's 38th State Assembly district election
Primary election
Party	Candidate	Votes	%
Democratic	Steve Bennett (incumbent)	54,690	59.7
Republican	Cole Brocato	33,352	36.4
No party preference	Daniel Wilson	3,506	3.8
Total votes		91,818	100%
General election
Democratic	Steve Bennett (incumbent)	79,709	61.2
Republican	Cole Brocato	50,544	38.8
Total votes		130,253	100%
Democratic hold			

== District 39 ==
2022 California's 39th State Assembly district election
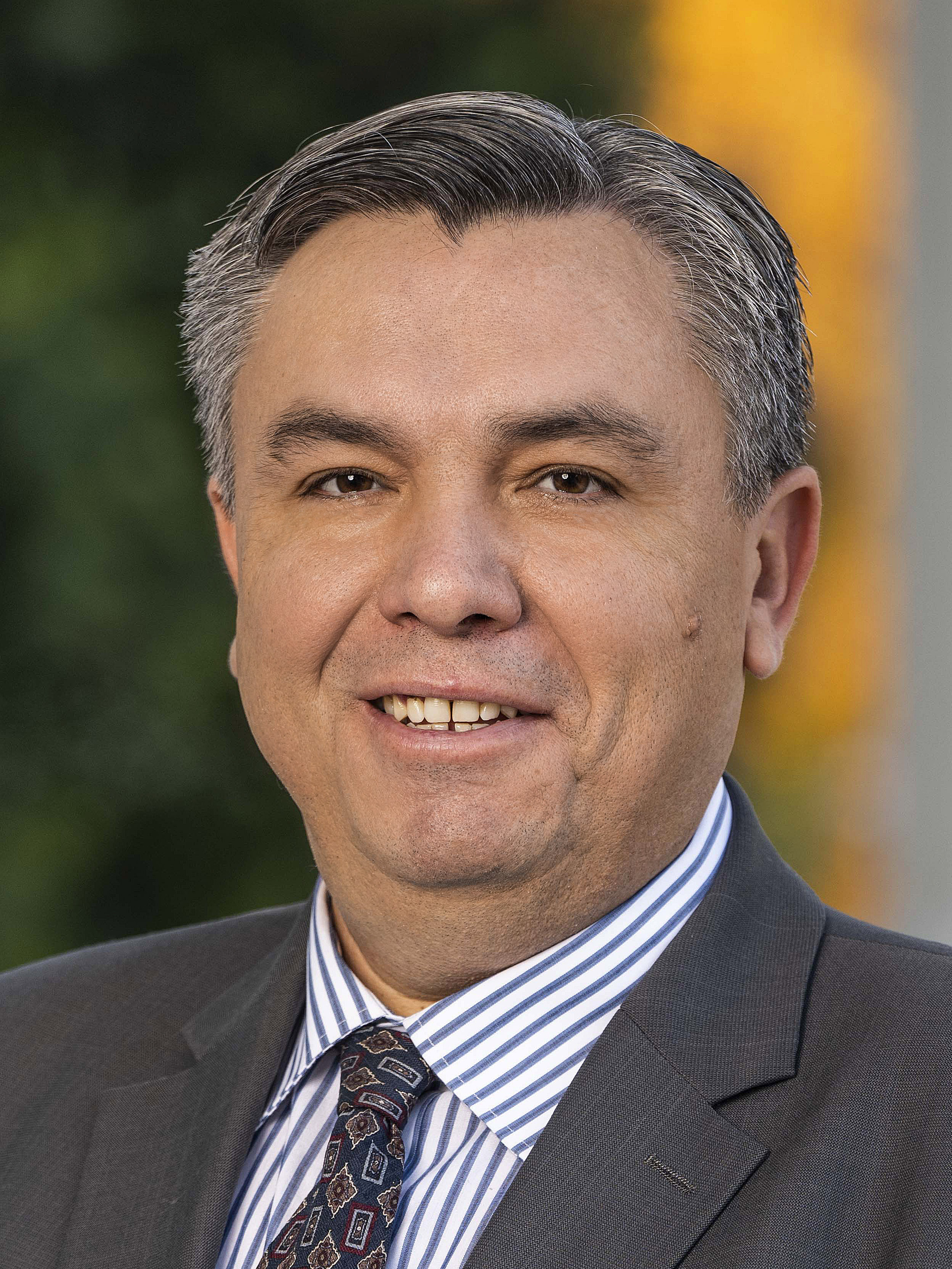

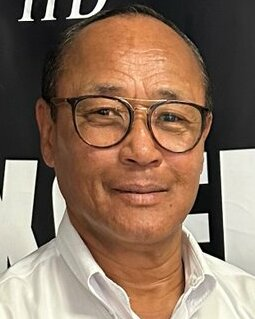
Candidate	Juan Carrillo	Paul Marsh
Party	Democratic	Republican
Popular vote	37,531	28,291
Percentage	57.0%	43.0%
U.S. Representative before election
Juan Carrillo
Democratic
Elected U.S. Representative
Juan Carrillo
Democratic

2022 California's 39th State Assembly district election
Primary election
Party	Candidate	Votes	%
Republican	Paul Andre Marsh	13,572	38.1
Democratic	Juan Carrillo	10,706	30.0
Democratic	Andrea Rosenthal	7,746	21.7
Democratic	Steve G. Fox	3,615	10.1
Total votes		35,639	100%
General election
Democratic	Juan Carrillo	37,531	57.0
Republican	Paul Andre Marsh	28,291	43.0
Total votes		65,822	100%
Democratic win (new seat)			

== District 40 ==
2022 California's 40th State Assembly district election
Primary election
Party	Candidate	Votes	%
Republican	Suzette Martinez Valladares (incumbent)	48,096	47.4
Democratic	Pilar Schiavo	34,415	34.0
Democratic	Annie E. Cho	18,891	18.6
Total votes		101,402	100%
General election
Democratic	Pilar Schiavo	79,852	50.2
Republican	Suzette Martinez Valladares (incumbent)	79,330	49.8
Total votes		159,182	100%
Democratic gain from Republican			

== District 41 ==
2022 California's 41st State Assembly district election
Primary election
Party	Candidate	Votes	%
Democratic	Chris Holden (incumbent)	74,735	96.7
Republican	Michael McMahon (write-in)	2,580	3.3
Total votes		77,315	100%
General election
Democratic	Chris Holden (incumbent)	104,740	60.0
Republican	Michael McMahon	69,835	40.0
Total votes		174,575	100%
Democratic hold			

== District 42 ==
2022 California's 42nd State Assembly district election
Primary election
Party	Candidate	Votes	%
Democratic	Jacqui Irwin (incumbent)	80,404	55.9
Republican	Lori Mills	41,717	29.0
Republican	Ted Nordblum	21,629	15.1
Total votes		143,750	100%
General election
Democratic	Jacqui Irwin (incumbent)	118,131	55.0
Republican	Lori Mills	96,482	45.0
Total votes		214,613	100%
Democratic hold			

== District 43 ==
2022 California's 43rd State Assembly district election
Primary election
Party	Candidate	Votes	%
Democratic	Luz Rivas (incumbent)	38,303	98.5
Republican	Siaka Massaquoi (write-in)	575	1.5
Total votes		38,878	100%
General election
Democratic	Luz Rivas (incumbent)	55,282	74.6
Republican	Siaka Massaquoi	18,782	25.4
Total votes		74,064	100%
Democratic hold			

== District 44 ==
2022 California's 44th State Assembly district election
Primary election
Party	Candidate	Votes	%
Democratic	Laura Friedman (incumbent)	80,209	73.2
Republican	Barry Curtis Jacobsen	29,381	26.8
Total votes		109,590	100%
General election
Democratic	Laura Friedman (incumbent)	113,380	71.4
Republican	Barry Curtis Jacobsen	45,519	28.6
Total votes		158,899	100%
Democratic hold			

== District 45 ==
2022 California's 45th State Assembly district election
Primary election
Party	Candidate	Votes	%
Democratic	James Ramos (incumbent)	26,402	64.1
Republican	Joseph W. Martinez	14,783	35.9
Total votes		41,185	100%
General election
Democratic	James Ramos (incumbent)	45,194	60.7
Republican	Joseph W. Martinez	29,209	39.3
Total votes		74,403	100%
Democratic hold			

== District 46 ==
2022 California's 46th State Assembly district election
Primary election
Party	Candidate	Votes	%
Democratic	Jesse Gabriel (incumbent)	52,362	67.3
Republican	Dana Caruso	25,437	32.7
Total votes		77,799	100%
General election
Democratic	Jesse Gabriel (incumbent)	78,726	65.4
Republican	Dana Caruso	41,619	34.6
Total votes		120,345	100%
Democratic hold			

== District 47 ==
2022 California's 47th State Assembly district election
Primary election
Party	Candidate	Votes	%
Democratic	Christy Holstege	51,169	46.5
Republican	Greg Wallis	37,996	34.5
Republican	Gary Michaels	12,716	11.5
Democratic	Jamie Swain	8,200	7.4
Total votes		110,081	100%
General election
Republican	Greg Wallis	84,752	50.03
Democratic	Christy Holstege	84,667	49.97
Total votes		169,419	100%
Republican gain from Independent			

== District 48 ==
2022 California's 48th State Assembly district election
Primary election
Party	Candidate	Votes	%
Democratic	Blanca Rubio (incumbent)	38,026	97.1
Republican	Ryan Maye (write-in)	1,138	2.9
Total votes		39,164	100%
General election
Democratic	Blanca Rubio (incumbent)	60,770	60.8
Republican	Ryan Maye	39,110	39.2
Total votes		99,880	100%
Democratic hold			

== District 49 ==
2022 California's 49th State Assembly district election
Primary election
Party	Candidate	Votes	%
Democratic	Mike Fong (incumbent)	42,929	70.2
Republican	Burton Brink	18,259	29.8
Total votes		61,188	100%
General election
Democratic	Mike Fong (incumbent)	65,965	66.6
Republican	Burton Brink	33,024	33.4
Total votes		98,989	100%
Democratic hold			

== District 50 ==
2022 California's 50th State Assembly district election
Primary election
Party	Candidate	Votes	%
Democratic	Eloise Reyes (incumbent)	26,540	57.0
Republican	Sheela Stark	18,428	39.6
Libertarian	Rodgir Cohen	1,577	3.4
Total votes		46,545	100%
General election
Democratic	Eloise Reyes (incumbent)	51,340	56.9
Republican	Sheela Stark	38,851	43.1
Total votes		90,191	100%
Democratic hold			

== District 51 ==
2022 California's 51st State Assembly district election
Primary election
Party	Candidate	Votes	%
Democratic	Rick Zbur	53,522	61.6
Democratic	Louis Abramson	33,300	38.4
Total votes		86,822	100%
General election
Democratic	Rick Zbur	76,110	54.9
Democratic	Louis Abramson	62,647	45.1
Total votes		138,757	100%
Democratic hold			

== District 52 ==
2022 California's 52nd State Assembly district election
Primary election
Party	Candidate	Votes	%
Democratic	Wendy Carrillo (incumbent)	43,040	49.2
Democratic	Mia Livas Porter	33,889	38.7
Republican	Gia D'Amato	10,541	12.1
Total votes		87,470	100%
General election
Democratic	Wendy Carrillo (incumbent)	65,039	56.9
Democratic	Mia Livas Porter	49,211	43.1
Total votes		114,250	100%
Democratic hold			

== District 53 ==
2022 California's 53rd State Assembly district election
Primary election
Party	Candidate	Votes	%
Democratic	Freddie Rodriguez (incumbent)	27,179	60.6
Republican	Toni Holle	17,646	39.4
Total votes		44,825	100%
General election
Democratic	Freddie Rodriguez (incumbent)	49,221	60.1
Republican	Toni Holle	32,684	39.9
Total votes		81,905	100%
Democratic hold			

== District 54 ==
2022 California's 54th State Assembly district election
Primary election
Party	Candidate	Votes	%
Democratic	Miguel Santiago (incumbent)	37,714	99.7
Republican	Elaine Alaniz (write-in)	129	0.3
Total votes		37,843	100%
General election
Democratic	Miguel Santiago (incumbent)	53,993	78.6
Republican	Elaine Alaniz	14,704	21.4
Total votes		68,697	100%
Democratic hold			

== District 55 ==
2022 California's 55th State Assembly district election
Primary election
Party	Candidate	Votes	%
Democratic	Isaac Bryan (incumbent)	79,141	85.7
Republican	Keith Girolamo Cascio	13,200	14.3
Total votes		92,341	100%
General election
Democratic	Isaac Bryan (incumbent)	114,384	83.7
Republican	Keith Girolamo Cascio	22,295	16.3
Total votes		136,679	100%
Democratic hold			

== District 56 ==
2022 California's 56th State Assembly district election
Primary election
Party	Candidate	Votes	%
Democratic	Lisa Calderon (incumbent)	35,943	59.7
Republican	Jessica Martinez	17,845	29.6
Republican	Natasha Serrano	6,466	10.7
Total votes		60,254	100%
General election
Democratic	Lisa Calderon (incumbent)	62,079	58.5
Republican	Jessica Martinez	44,105	41.5
Total votes		106,184	100%
Democratic hold			

== District 57 ==
2022 California's 57th State Assembly district election
Primary election
Party	Candidate	Votes	%
Democratic	Reggie Jones-Sawyer (incumbent)	25,332	100%
Total votes		25,332	100%
General election
Democratic	Reggie Jones-Sawyer (incumbent)	40,334	100%
Total votes		40,334	100%
Democratic hold			

== District 58 ==
2022 California's 58th State Assembly district election
Primary election
Party	Candidate	Votes	%
Democratic	Sabrina Cervantes (incumbent)	28,568	54.1
Republican	Bernard William Murphy	13,449	25.5
Republican	Leticia Castillo	10,756	20.4
Total votes		52,773	100%
General election
Democratic	Sabrina Cervantes (incumbent)	50,259	53.6
Republican	Bernard William Murphy	43,464	46.4
Total votes		93,723	100%
Democratic hold			

== District 59 ==
2022 California's 59th State Assembly district election
Primary election
Party	Candidate	Votes	%
Republican	Phillip Chen (incumbent)	75,555	99.2
No party preference	Leon Sit (write-in)	551	0.7
Libertarian	David Naranjo (write-in)	58	0.1
Total votes		76,164	100%
General election
Republican	Phillip Chen (incumbent)	113,363	70.0
No party preference	Leon Q. Sit	48,602	30.0
Total votes		161,965	100%
Republican hold			

== District 60 ==
2022 California's 60th State Assembly district election
Primary election
Party	Candidate	Votes	%
Republican	Hector Diaz-Nava	16,518	39.9
Democratic	Corey Jackson	11,158	27.0
Democratic	Esther Portillo	8,219	19.9
Democratic	Jasmin Rubio	5,471	13.2
Total votes		41,366	100%
General election
Democratic	Corey Jackson	39,260	54.7
Republican	Hector Diaz-Nava	32,574	45.3
Total votes		71,834	100%
Democratic win (new seat)			

== District 61 ==
2022 California's 61st State Assembly district election
Primary election
Party	Candidate	Votes	%
Democratic	Robert Pullen-Miles	24,322	38.6
Democratic	Tina McKinnor	20,478	32.5
Republican	James Arlandus Spencer	8,942	14.2
Democratic	Angie Reyes English	6,777	10.7
Democratic	Nico Ruderman	2,540	4.0
Total votes		63,059	100%
General election
Democratic	Tina McKinnor (incumbent) (Note: Candidate was not an incumbent during the primary but was an incumbent in the general election after winning the special election for the seat. The special election was held on the same day as the primary.)	58,888	63.6
Democratic	Robert Pullen-Miles	33,691	36.4
Total votes		92,579	100%
Democratic hold			

== District 62 ==
2022 California's 62nd State Assembly district election
Primary election
Party	Candidate	Votes	%
Democratic	Anthony Rendon (incumbent)	24,003	67.0
Democratic	Maria Estrada	11,826	33.0
Total votes		35,829	100%
General election
Democratic	Anthony Rendon (incumbent)	39,442	63.9
Democratic	Maria Estrada	22,285	36.1
Total votes		61,727	100%
Democratic hold			

== District 63 ==
2022 California's 63rd State Assembly district election
Primary election
Party	Candidate	Votes	%
Democratic	Fauzia Rizvi	33,456	40.0
Republican	Bill Essayli	28,659	34.2
Republican	Clint Lorimore	21,598	25.8
Total votes		83,713	100%
General election
Republican	Bill Essayli	82,613	58.6
Democratic	Fauzia Rizvi	58,346	41.4
Total votes		140,959	100%
Republican win (new seat)			

== District 64 ==
2022 California's 64th State Assembly district election
Primary election
Party	Candidate	Votes	%
Republican	Raul Ortiz Jr.	18,048	33.0
Democratic	Blanca Pacheco	12,640	23.1
Democratic	Elizabeth Alcantar	9,558	17.5
Democratic	Rose Espinoza	4,929	9.0
Democratic	Ana M. Valencia	4,916	9.0
Democratic	Robert Cancio	4,655	8.5
Total votes		54,746	100%
General election
Democratic	Blanca Pacheco	59,575	61.4
Republican	Raul Ortiz Jr.	37,426	38.6
Total votes		97,001	100%
Democratic hold			

== District 65 ==
2022 California's 65th State Assembly district election
Primary election
Party	Candidate	Votes	%
Democratic	Mike Gipson (incumbent)	28,801	68.0
Democratic	Fatima Iqbal-Zubair	13,162	31.1
Republican	Lydia Gutierrez (write-in)	414	1.0
Total votes		42,377	100%
General election
Democratic	Mike Gipson (incumbent)	43,118	61.7
Democratic	Fatima Iqbal-Zubair	26,719	38.3
Total votes		69,837	100%
Democratic hold			

== District 66 ==
2022 California's 66th State Assembly district election
Primary election
Party	Candidate	Votes	%
Democratic	Al Muratsuchi (incumbent)	67,618	61.7
Republican	George Barks	41,918	38.3
Total votes		109,536	100%
General election
Democratic	Al Muratsuchi (incumbent)	99,280	59.9
Republican	George Barks	66,332	40.1
Total votes		165,612	100%
Democratic hold			

== District 67 ==
2022 California's 67th State Assembly district election
Primary election
Party	Candidate	Votes	%
Democratic	Sharon Quirk-Silva (incumbent)	30,873	47.7
Republican	Soo Yoo	25,005	38.6
Democratic	Param Brar	4,800	7.4
Republican	Sou Moua	4,076	6.3
Total votes		64,754	100%
General election
Democratic	Sharon Quirk-Silva (incumbent)	58,781	53.3
Republican	Soo Yoo	51,441	46.7
Total votes		110,222	100%
Democratic hold			

== District 68 ==
2022 California's 68th State Assembly district election
Primary election
Party	Candidate	Votes	%
Democratic	Avelino Valencia	22,635	48.3
Republican	Mike Tardif	11,034	23.5
Democratic	Bulmaro Vicente	7,029	15.0
Republican	James Wallace	6,189	13.2
Total votes		46,887	100%
General election
Democratic	Avelino Valencia	49,385	62.3
Republican	Mike Tardif	29,910	37.7
Total votes		79,295	100%
Democratic hold			

== District 69 ==
2022 California's 69th State Assembly district election
Primary election
Party	Candidate	Votes	%
Democratic	Josh Lowenthal	30,919	45.6
Democratic	Al Austin II	17,985	26.5
Democratic	Janet Denise Foster	12,790	18.9
Democratic	Merry Taheri	6,052	8.9
Total votes		67,746	100%
General election
Democratic	Josh Lowenthal	62,582	58.9
Democratic	Al Austin II	43,686	41.1
Total votes		106,268	100%
Democratic hold			

== District 70 ==
2022 California's 70th State Assembly district election
Primary election
Party	Candidate	Votes	%
Democratic	Diedre Thu-Ha Nguyen	31,293	39.7
Republican	Tri Ta	16,708	21.2
Republican	Ted Bui	10,968	13.9
Republican	Kimberly Ho	10,936	13.9
Republican	Emily Hibard	5,278	6.7
Republican	Jason Gray	3,624	4.6
Total votes		78,807	100%
General election
Republican	Tri Ta	64,849	53.8
Democratic	Diedre Thu-Ha Nguyen	55,661	46.2
Total votes		120,510	100%
Republican win (new seat)			

== District 71 ==
2022 California's 71st State Assembly district election
Primary election
Party	Candidate	Votes	%
Republican	Matt Rahn	41,943	51.7
Republican	Kate Sanchez	39,143	48.2
Democratic	Albia Cooper Miller (write-in)	58	0.1
Total votes		81,144	100%
General election
Republican	Kate Sanchez	75,603	51.3
Republican	Matt Rahn	71,730	48.7
Total votes		147,333	100%
Republican hold			

== District 72 ==
2022 California's 72nd State Assembly district election
Primary election
Party	Candidate	Votes	%
Democratic	Judie Mancuso	59,016	43.3
Republican	Diane Dixon	58,132	42.7
Republican	Benjamin Yu	19,115	14.0
Total votes		136,263	100%
General election
Republican	Diane Dixon	116,588	56.2
Democratic	Judie Mancuso	90,730	43.8
Total votes		207,318	100%
Republican hold			

== District 73 ==
2022 California's 73rd State Assembly district election
Primary election
Party	Candidate	Votes	%
Democratic	Cottie Petrie-Norris (incumbent)	44,890	56.2
Republican	Steven Choi (incumbent)	34,957	43.8
Total votes		79,847	100%
General election
Democratic	Cottie Petrie-Norris (incumbent)	75,950	55.8
Republican	Steven Choi (incumbent)	60,212	44.2
Total votes		136,162	100%
Democratic hold			

== District 74 ==
2022 California's 74th State Assembly district election
Primary election
Party	Candidate	Votes	%
Republican	Laurie Davies (incumbent)	60,568	53.9
Democratic	Chris Duncan	51,768	46.1
Total votes		112,336	100%
General election
Republican	Laurie Davies (incumbent)	91,637	52.6
Democratic	Chris Duncan	82,466	47.4
Total votes		174,103	100%
Republican hold			

== District 75 ==
2022 California's 75th State Assembly district election
Primary election
Party	Candidate	Votes	%
Republican	Marie Waldron (incumbent)	59,612	63.5
Republican	Randy Voepel (incumbent)	34,328	36.5
Total votes		93,940	100%
General election
Republican	Marie Waldron (incumbent)	100,950	67.8
Republican	Randy Voepel (incumbent)	47,888	32.2
Total votes		148,838	100%
Republican hold			

== District 76 ==
2022 California's 76th State Assembly district election
Primary election
Party	Candidate	Votes	%
Democratic	Brian Maienschein (incumbent)	48,635	49.9
Republican	Kristie Bruce-Lane	27,375	28.1
Republican	June Cutter	21,381	22.0
Total votes		97,391	100%
General election
Democratic	Brian Maienschein (incumbent)	78,895	51.6
Republican	Kristie Bruce-Lane	73,944	48.4
Total votes		152,839	100%
Democratic hold			

== District 77 ==
2022 California's 77th State Assembly district election
Primary election
Party	Candidate	Votes	%
Democratic	Tasha Boerner Horvath (incumbent)	78,673	60.9
Republican	Dan Downey	50,530	39.1
Total votes		129,203	100%
General election
Democratic	Tasha Boerner Horvath (incumbent)	121,447	60.4
Republican	Dan Downey	79,637	39.6
Total votes		201,084	100%
Democratic hold			

== District 78 ==
2022 California's 78th State Assembly district election
Primary election
Party	Candidate	Votes	%
Democratic	Chris Ward (incumbent)	76,917	68.2
Republican	Eric E. Gonzales	35,857	31.8
Total votes		112,774	100%
General election
Democratic	Chris Ward (incumbent)	118,215	68.6
Republican	Eric E. Gonzales	54,234	31.4
Total votes		172,449	100%
Democratic hold			

== District 79 ==
2022 California's 79th State Assembly district election
Primary election
Party	Candidate	Votes	%
Democratic	Akilah Weber (incumbent)	42,857	64.3
Republican	Corbin Sabol	16,651	25.0
Republican	John Moore	7,159	10.7
Total votes		66,667	100%
General election
Democratic	Akilah Weber (incumbent)	67,674	63.9
Republican	Corbin Sabol	38,290	36.1
Total votes		105,964	100%
Democratic hold			

== District 80 ==
2022 California's 80th State Assembly district election
Primary election
Party	Candidate	Votes	%
Democratic	Georgette Gómez	25,308	36.4
Democratic	David Alvarez	21,548	31.0
Republican	John Vogel Garcia	14,162	20.3
Republican	Lincoln Pickard	8,578	12.3
Total votes		69,596	100%
General election
Democratic	David Alvarez (incumbent)	67,309	69.3
Democratic	Georgette Gómez	29,869	30.7
Total votes		97,178	100%
Democratic hold			

== See also ==
- 2022 California elections
- 2022 United States elections
