= Pilar Schiavo =

American politician (born 1975)

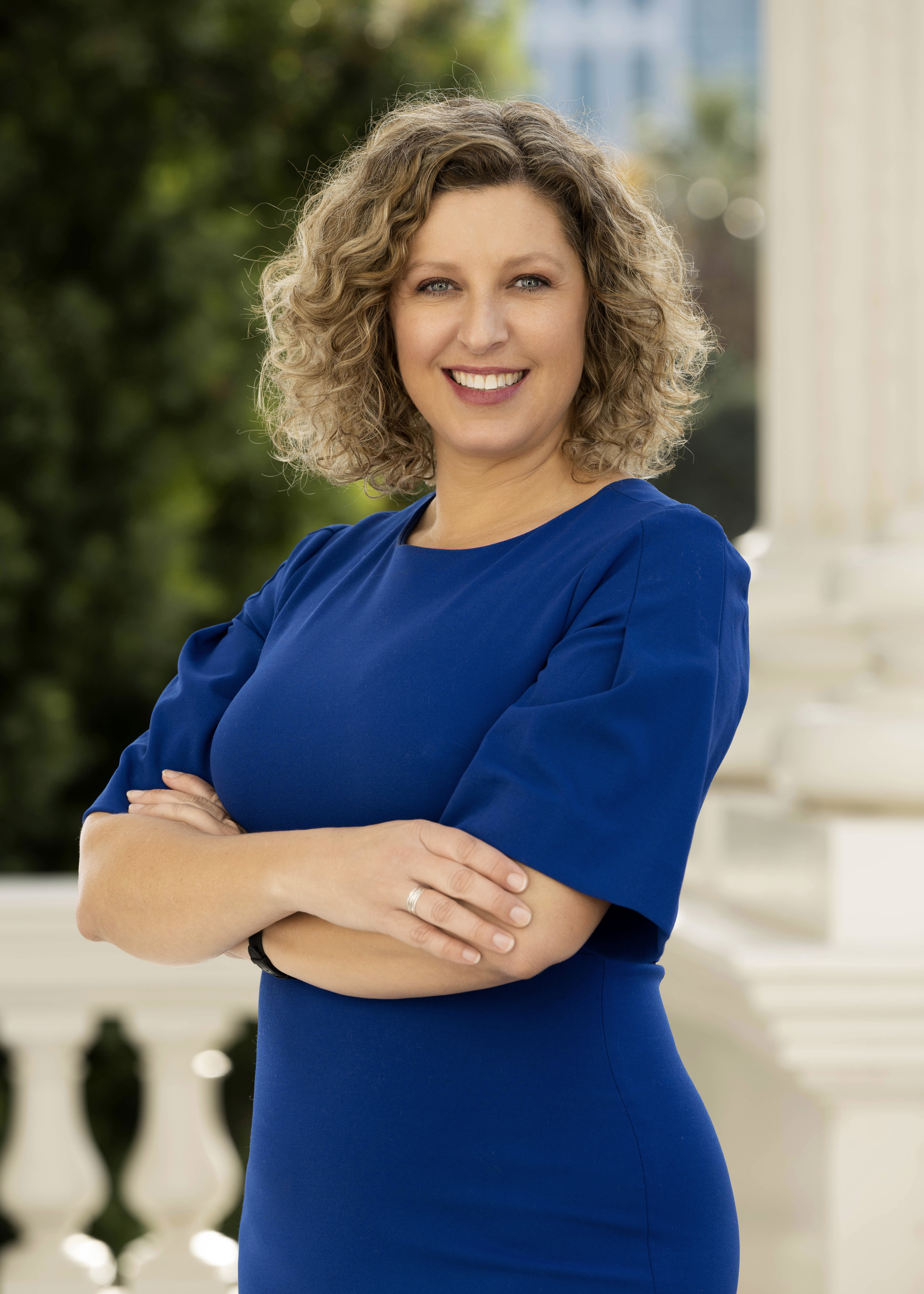
- Official portrait, 2022

Member of the California State Assembly from the 40th district
- Incumbent
- Assumed office December 7, 2022
- Preceded by: Suzette Martinez Valladares

Personal details
- Born: January 22, 1975 (age 51) Sonora, California
- Party: Democratic
- Children: 1
- Education: Sonoma State University; University of Massachusetts Amherst

Pilar Schiavo (born January 22, 1975) is a member of the California State Assembly, representing the state's 40th District as a member of the Democratic Party since 2022. The area represents parts of northwest San Fernando Valley, Santa Clarita Valley and Valencia. Prior to serving in the Assembly, Schiavo was a small business owner and Nurse Advocate.

== Political career ==
In her first campaign for political office, Schiavo defeated incumbent Republican Assemblymember Suzette Valladares in the November 2022 election by 522 votes. In 2022, Schiavo gained the endorsement of the Los Angeles Times, among dozens of others.

During her campaign, she was endorsed by a broad-range of organizations, elected officials, community leaders, and labor unions, including firefighters, nurses, police officers, teachers, Planned Parenthood and the Sierra Club.

== Electoral history ==
2022 California State Assembly 40th district election
Primary election
Party	Candidate	Votes	%
Republican	Suzette Martinez Valladares (incumbent)	48,096	47.4
Democratic	Pilar Schiavo	34,415	33.9
Democratic	Annie E. Cho	18,891	18.6
Total votes		101,402	100.0
General election
Democratic	Pilar Schiavo	79,852	50.2
Republican	Suzette Martinez Valladares (incumbent)	79,330	49.8
Total votes		159,182	100.0
Democratic gain from Republican			

2024 California State Assembly 40th district election
Primary election
Party	Candidate	Votes	%
Democratic	Pilar Schiavo (incumbent)	54,941	50.2
Republican	Patrick Lee Gipson	54,420	49.8
Total votes		109,361	100.0
General election
Democratic	Pilar Schiavo (incumbent)	119,654	52.8
Republican	Patrick Lee Gipson	106,960	47.2
Total votes		226,614	100.0
Democratic hold			
