= Vanessa Marquez =

American actress (1968–2018)

- Born: Vanessa Rosalia Marquez; December 21, 1968; Los Angeles County, California, U.S.
- Died: August 30, 2018 (aged 49); South Pasadena, California, U.S.
- Cause of death: Suicide by cop
- Occupation: Actress
- Years active: 1987–2017

Vanessa Rosalia Marquez (December 21, 1968 – August 30, 2018) was an American actress. She was primarily known for her recurring role in the first three seasons of ER as nurse Wendy Goldman, as well as her role as Ana Delgado in the 1988 biographical drama film Stand and Deliver.

== Career ==
In 1992, Marquez appeared in the Seinfeld fourth season episode "The Cheever Letters", portraying a secretary in the Cuban Permanent Mission (the US and Cuba did not have mutual embassies from 1961 to 2015). Her success with Stand and Deliver led to a career in film and television, with roles in the crime drama Blood In Blood Out (1993), and the independent film Twenty Bucks (1993). Her television work included guest spots on popular programs, including Melrose Place in 1994 and Malcolm & Eddie in 1999, and recurring roles on ER from 1994 to 1997. In addition to her acting credentials, Marquez appeared as a singer in the 2000 thriller film Under Suspicion.

== Personal life ==
Vanessa Rosalia Marquez was born in Los Angeles County, California. She was the daughter of John Marquez, who died during the Vietnam War when she was one and half years old; and Delia McElfresh. She grew up in Montebello, where she attended Schurr High School.

In October 2017, Marquez made headlines related to the #MeToo movement, alleging that she endured harassment while on the set of ER. She accused series star George Clooney of helping to "blacklist" her after she complained to executives about the harassment. Clooney denied the allegations.

=== Mental illness and health problems ===
Marquez appeared in an early episode of the A&E Network reality television series Intervention, as she tried to manage her shopping addiction. Marquez was given an "intervention" by friends (including Stand and Deliver co-star Karla Montana) to get her to go to treatment; she later said that her treatment was not successful. She had several mental health conditions, including bipolar disorder, obsessive compulsive disorder, anorexia nervosa, and agoraphobia, that ended her career as an actress and left her almost entirely house bound. She also had celiac disease, fibromyalgia, and depression at the time of her death, and had regular seizures.

== Death ==
Marquez died on August 30, 2018, at her home in South Pasadena, California, where a wellness check by local authorities led to an armed confrontation between her and the South Pasadena Police Department. Her home was found in a state of disarray and she claimed to be experiencing a seizure, for which paramedics and a mental health expert were called to evaluate her. Marquez was shot several times by police after she pointed a firearm and advanced toward the officers, who had retreated down the stairs after initially seeing the "firearm". She was taken to a nearby hospital where she was pronounced dead at 2:36 p.m. local time. The "firearm" was later determined to be a replica. The Los Angeles County District Attorney's Office has ruled that the police officers had acted in lawful self-defense in the shooting.

In February 2019, attorneys representing her mother filed a wrongful death claim against the City of South Pasadena. The claim alleges battery, negligence, unlawful entry, false arrest and imprisonment, wrongful death, negligent training, conspiracy, seizure of property, failure to summon prompt medical care and violation of the Bane Act. In March 2020, the South Pasadena Police Department released bodycam footage from the incident, showing Marquez pleading to the officers to kill her, as well as pointing the replica gun at them. The LA County District Attorney's Office released its report on February 25 the same year. On February 23, 2021, the City of South Pasadena settled the wrongful death suit with Marquez's mother in the amount of $450,000.

== Filmography ==
=== Film ===
Year	Title	Role	Notes
1988	Stand and Deliver	Ana Delgado	
1989	Night Children	Runt	
1992	Maniac Cop III: Badge of Silence	Terry	
1993	Twenty Bucks	Melanie	
1993	Blood In Blood Out	Montana's daughter	
1993	Father Hood	Delores	
2000	Under Suspicion	Singer	Voice

=== Television ===
Year	Title	Role	Notes
1990	To My Daughter	Student #1	Television film
1990	Wiseguy	Consuelo Burns	Episodes: "Point of No Return" and "Changing Houses"
1990	Sweet 15	Lupe	Television film
1991	Locked Up: A Mother's Rage	Yo-Yo	Television film
1992	Tequila and Bonetti	Lupe	Episode: "Brooklyn and the Beast"
1992	Seinfeld	Receptionist	Episode: "The Cheever Letters"
1994	State of Emergency	Violetta	Television film
1994	Nurses	Angelica	Episode: "The One After the Earthquake"
1994	Melrose Place	Linda Cortez	Episode: "The Doctor Who Rocks the Cradle"
1994–1997	ER	Nurse Wendy Goldman	Recurring role, 27 episodes
1997	All Lies End in Murder	Yvonne Valesquez	Television film
1999	Malcolm & Eddie	Janice Ramos	Episodes: "The Fool Monty", "As You Strike It" and "Worst Impressions"
2001	Fire & Ice	Wanda Hernandez	Television film

=== Video ===
Year	Title	Role	Notes
2006	Return of Pink Five	Pink Squadron Pilot	Short
