= Marc Steinorth =

American politician

Member of the California State Assembly from the 40th district
- In office December 1, 2014 – November 30, 2018
- Preceded by: Mike Morrell
- Succeeded by: James Ramos

Personal details
- Born: May 19, 1970 (age 56)
- Party: Republican
- Spouse: Maria (m. 1996)
- Children: Madison; Mason
- Education: University of California, Riverside

Marc Steinorth (born May 19, 1970) is an American politician who served in the California State Assembly. A Republican, he represented the 40th Assembly District, encompassing the San Bernardino County communities of Highland, Loma Linda, Redlands, and parts of both Rancho Cucamonga and the city of San Bernardino. Prior to being elected to the State Assembly, he was a Rancho Cucamonga City Councilmember.

Steinorth was first elected to the State Assembly in 2014, and was re-elected in 2016. He chose not to run for re-election to the State Assembly in 2018.

== Early life and career ==
Steinorth was raised in a military family, as his father served as an Officer in the United States Air Force. After graduating from Ramstein American High School in West Germany, Steinorth attended the University of Maryland at Munich before returning to Southern California, where he then completed his studies and graduated with honors from the University of California, Riverside with a bachelor's degree in political science. In 1998, Steinorth founded The Atlas Buying Group inc, an advertising agency that provides professional services to local businesses and corporations nationwide.

== Politics ==
=== 2012 City council ===
In the 2012 general election, Steinorth received the most votes (17,385 or 26%) and secured a seat in the Rancho Cucamonga City Council. As a Council Member, Steinorth was the vice chairman of the League of California Cities Inland Region Legislative Task Force, member of the Chamber of Commerce committee and the Technology and Communications Subcommittee, as well as the Consolidated Fire Agencies (ConFire) committee.

=== 2014 California State Assembly candidacy ===
On December 5, 2013, Steinorth announced that he would be running as a Republican candidate for California's 40th State Assembly district in the upcoming 2014 mid-term elections and won.

California's 40th State Assembly district election, 2014
Primary election
Party	Candidate	Votes	%
Republican	Marc Steinorth	20,292	53.9
Democratic	Kathleen Henry	6,416	17.1
Democratic	Melissa O'Donnell	5,835	15.5
Democratic	Arthur Bustamonte	5,085	13.5
Total votes		37,628	100.0
General election
Republican	Marc Steinorth	39,303	55.7
Democratic	Kathleen Henry	31,309	44.3
Total votes		70,612	100.0
Republican hold			

=== 2016 California State Assembly candidacy ===
In 2016, Steinorth was challenged by Democratic San Bernardino School Board Trustee Abigail Medina, who waged a vigorous campaign. Medina pointed out her own rise from poverty and tried to tie Steinorth to Donald Trump, who was unpopular in California. Steinorth won by 1,948 votes, one of the closest Assembly elections of 2016.

Steinorth was reelected with 50.6% of the vote.

California's 40th State Assembly district election, 2016
Primary election
Party	Candidate	Votes	%
Democratic	Abigail Medina	39,583	51.5
Republican	Marc Steinorth (incumbent)	37,339	48.5
Total votes		76,922	100.0
General election
Republican	Marc Steinorth (incumbent)	76,537	50.6
Democratic	Abigail Medina	74,589	49.4
Total votes		151,126	100.0
Republican hold			

=== 2018 election cycle ===
In 2017, Steinorth voted for the AB 398 Cap and Trade program, which was estimated to raise gas prices by up to 71 cents per gallon according to the Howard Jarvis Taxpayers Association. Following his vote, Steinorth faced backlash from conservative activists who accused him of betraying taxpayers.

Steinorth decided to challenge incumbent 2nd District San Bernardino County Supervisor Janice Rutherford in the 2018 primary election. Steinorth lost the race despite spending more money and receiving more outside support.

After losing to Supervisor Janice Rutherford in the June 2018 Primary Election, Steinorth ran for the Rancho Cucamonga City Council in November 2018, a position he held from 2012 until 2014. Steinorth narrowly lost this race as well.

== Personal ==
Steinorth has two children, Madison and Mason.
