= Leo H. Susman =

American politician

Member of the California State Assembly from the 40th district
- In office January 5, 1903 - January 2, 1905
- Preceded by: Hamilton A. Bauer
- Succeeded by: Gus Hartman

Personal details
- Born: April 27, 1879 Hobart, Tasmania, Australia
- Died: December 19, 1928 (aged 49) San Francisco, California
- Party: Republican

Leo H. Susman (April 27, 1879 - December 19, 1928) served in the California State Assembly for the 40th district from 1903 to 1905.

He was born in Hobart, Tasmania, Australia.
