= Chris B. Fox =

American politician

Member of the California State Assembly from the 40th district
- In office January 8, 1923 - January 5, 1925
- Preceded by: Arthur A. Wendering
- Succeeded by: Harold C. Cloudman

Personal details
- Born: September 25, 1888 Grass Valley, California
- Died: February 12, 1968 (aged 79) Alameda, California
- Party: Republican
- Spouse: Henriette Ruth Skinner
- Children: 2

Military service
- Branch/service: United States Army
- Battles/wars: World War I

Christopher Bernhardt Fox (September 25, 1888 – February 12, 1968) served in the California State Assembly for the 40th district from 1923 to 1925. During World War I he also served in the United States Army.
