= Mike Morrell =

American politician and real estate broker from California

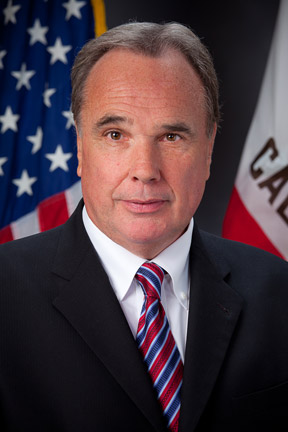

Member of the California State Senate from the 23rd district
- In office April 3, 2014 – November 30, 2020
- Preceded by: Bill Emmerson
- Succeeded by: Rosilicie Ochoa Bogh

Member of the California State Assembly
- In office December 6, 2010 – April 3, 2014
- Preceded by: Bill Emmerson
- Succeeded by: Marc Steinorth
- Constituency: 63rd district (2010–2012); 40th district (2012–2014)

Personal details
- Born: October 14, 1952 (age 73) Covina, California, U.S.
- Party: Republican
- Spouse: Joanie Morrell
- Children: 4
- Education: University of La Verne (BA)

Mike Morrell (born October 14, 1952) is an American politician who served in the California State Senate from 2014 to 2020. He was elected as a Republican to the California State Assembly in 2010, and won a special election to the State Senate in March 2014. Prior to serving in the state legislature, he was a real estate broker.

== Early life ==
Morrell was born in Covina, California.

== Education ==
Morrell has a BA in Business from the University of La Verne.

== Career ==
As a state assemblyman, Morrell represented the 40th district, encompassing part of San Bernardino County. He served as the Vice Chair of the Labor and Employment Committee and a member of the Budget, the Banking and Finance, the Environmental Safety and Toxic Materials, the Jobs, Economic Development, and the Economy, and the Joint Sunset Review Committees.

In March 2014, Morrell won a special election and became a Republican member of California State Senate for District 23. Morrell succeeded Bill Emmerson, who resigned. Morrell was sworn in on April 3, 2014 to serve District 23.

=== Memberships ===
- Legislative Committee for the Citrus Valley Association of Realtor
- Advisory Board to the Pacific Justice Institute

== Electoral history ==
2016 • 2014 • 2012 • 2010

=== 2016 California State Senate election ===
California's 23rd State Senate district election, 2016
Primary election
Party	Candidate	Votes	%
Republican	Mike Morrell (incumbent)	93,484	54.8
Democratic	Ronald J. O'Donnell	50,850	29.8
Democratic	Mark Westwood	26,300	15.4
Total votes		170,634	100.0
General election
Republican	Mike Morrell (incumbent)	184,470	56.6
Democratic	Ronald J. O'Donnell	141,533	43.4
Total votes		326,003	100.0
Republican hold			

=== 2014 California State Senate special election ===
California's 23rd State Senate district special election, 2014 Vacancy resulting from the resignation of Bill Emmerson
Primary election
Party	Candidate	Votes	%
Republican	Mike Morrell	43,447	62.6
Democratic	Ronald J. O'Donnell	10,531	15.2
Democratic	Ameenah Fuller	6,705	9.7
Libertarian	Jeff Hewitt	4,479	6.5
Republican	Crystal Ruiz	4,187	6.0
Total votes		69,349	100.0
Republican hold			

=== 2012 California State Assembly election ===
California's 40th State Assembly district election, 2012
Primary election
Party	Candidate	Votes	%
Republican	Mike Morrell (incumbent)	26,261	58.2
Democratic	Russ Warner	18,862	41.8
Total votes		42,123	100.0
General election
Republican	Mike Morrell (incumbent)	65,282	50.4
Democratic	Russ Warner	64,264	49.6
Total votes		129,546	100.0
Republican hold			

=== 2010 California State Assembly election ===
California's 63rd State Assembly district election, 2010
Party	Candidate	Votes	%
Republican	Mike Morrell	72,866	58.1
Democratic	Renea Wickman	52,653	41.9
Total votes		125,519	100.0
Republican hold			

== Awards ==
- 2014 Henry J. Mello award. Presented at 34th Annual Legislative Session of the California Senior Legislature.

== Personal life ==
Morrell's wife is Joanie Morrell. They have three children. Morrell and his family live in Rancho Cucamonga, California.
