= Harold C. Cloudman =

American politician (1880–1955)

Member of the California State Assembly from the 40th district
- In office January 5, 1925 - January 2, 1933
- Preceded by: Chris B. Fox
- Succeeded by: James J. McBride

Personal details
- Born: April 29, 1880 You Bet, California
- Died: July 28, 1955 (aged 75) Berkeley, California
- Party: Republican
- Spouse: Elizabeth L.

Military service
- Branch/service: United States Army
- Battles/wars: World War I

Harold Caldwell Cloudman (April 29, 1880 - July 28, 1955) served in the California State Assembly for the 40th district from 1925 to 1933. During World War I he served in the United States Army.
