= California's 23rd senatorial district =

American legislative district

California's 23rd State Senate district
Current senator
Suzette Martinez Valladares; R–Santa Clarita
- Population (2020) • Voting age • Citizen voting age: 1,033,749; 681,524; 622,618
- Demographics: 45.5% White; 10.8% Black; 37.9% Latino; 5.8% Asian; 0% Native American; 0% Hawaiian/Pacific Islander; 0% other; 0% remainder of multiracial
- Registered voters: 561,146
- Registration: 40.44% Democratic; 29.97% Republican; 21.07% No party preference

California's 23rd senatorial district is one of 40 California State Senate districts. It is currently represented by Republican Suzette Martinez Valladares of Santa Clarita.

== District profile ==
For and after the 2024 California State Senate election, the district will encompass the high desert communities of the Antelope Valley and Victor Valley, as well as the Santa Clarita Valley in Los Angeles County. The district has a very large Latino population.

Los Angeles County

- Lancaster
- Palmdale
- Santa Clarita

San Bernardino County

- Hesperia
- Victorville

== Election results from statewide races ==
Year	Office	Results
2022	Governor	Dahle 53.6 – 46.4%
2022	Senator	Meuser 51.5 – 48.5%
2020	President	Biden 49.0 – 48.8%
2018	Governor	Cox 54.4 – 45.6%
2018	Senator	de Leon 52.6 – 47.4%
2016	President	Trump 48.7 – 45.7%
2016	Senator	Harris 58.3 – 41.7%
2014	Governor	Kashkari 57.7 – 42.3%
2012	President	Romney 51.8 – 46.0%
2012	Senator	Emken 51.9 – 48.1%

== List of senators representing the district ==
Due to redistricting, the 23rd district has been moved around different parts of the state. The current iteration resulted from the 2021 redistricting by the California Citizens Redistricting Commission.

=== 1863–1873: two seats ===
Years	Seat A			Seat B			Counties represented
Years	Senator	Party	Electoral history	Member	Party	Electoral history	Counties represented
January 6, 1862 – December 7, 1863	Lewis Cunningham (Marysville)	Union	Elected in 1862. Re-elected in 1863. Re-elected in 1865. [data missing]	William H. Parks (Marysville)	Union	Elected in 1862. [data missing]	Yuba
December 7, 1863 – December 4, 1865	Lewis Cunningham (Marysville)	Union	Elected in 1862. Re-elected in 1863. Re-elected in 1865. [data missing]	Charles S. Haswell (Nicolaus)	Union	Elected in 1863. [data missing]	Sutter, Yuba
December 4, 1865 – December 6, 1867	Lewis Cunningham (Marysville)	Union	Elected in 1862. Re-elected in 1863. Re-elected in 1865. [data missing]	Eli Teegarden (Marysville)	Union	Elected in 1865. Re-elected in 1867. [data missing]	Sutter, Yuba
December 6, 1867 – December 6, 1869	Horace Beach (Marysville)	Union	Elected in 1867. [data missing]	Eli Teegarden (Marysville)	Union	Elected in 1865. Re-elected in 1867. [data missing]	Sutter, Yuba
December 6, 1869 – December 4, 1871	Samuel C. Hutchings (Marysville)	Democratic	Elected in 1868. [data missing]	Second seat was eliminated for the term.			Sutter, Yuba
December 4, 1871 – December 1, 1873	Samuel C. Hutchings (Marysville)	Democratic	Elected in 1868. [data missing]	L. T. Crane (Marysville)	Republican	Elected in 1871. [data missing]	Sutter, Yuba

=== 1873–present: one seat ===
Senator	Party	Years served	Electoral history	Counties represented
Stephen L. Spencer (Camptonville)	Republican	December 1, 1873 – December 6, 1875	Elected in 1873. Redistricted to the 25th district.	Sutter, Yuba
Thomas Fraser (Placerville)	Republican	December 6, 1875 – December 3, 1877	Elected in 1874 [data missing]	Alpine, El Dorado
William H. Brown (Placerville)	Republican	December 3, 1877 – January 8, 1883	Elected in 1877. Re-elected in 1879. Re-elected in 1880. [data missing]	Alpine, El Dorado
Thomas Fraser (Placerville)	Republican	January 8, 1883 – January 5, 1885	Elected in 1882.	Alpine, El Dorado
Henry Mahler (Coloma)	Democratic	January 5, 1885 – January 3, 1887	Elected in 1884. Retired to run for State Assembly.	Alpine, El Dorado
P. J. Crimmins (San Francisco)	Republican	January 3, 1887 – January 7, 1889	Elected in 1886. [data missing]	San Francisco
William H. Williams (San Francisco)	Democratic	January 7, 1889 – January 2, 1893	Elected in 1888. [data missing]	San Francisco
Charles S. Arms (San Francisco)	Democratic	January 2, 1893 – January 4, 1897	Elected in 1892. [data missing]	San Francisco
Sydney Hall (San Francisco)	Democratic	January 4, 1897 – January 1, 1901	Elected in 1896. [data missing]	San Francisco
John G. Tyrrell (San Francisco)	Republican	January 1, 1901 – January 2, 1905	Elected in 1900. [data missing]	San Francisco
George B. Keane (San Francisco)	Republican	January 2, 1905 – January 4, 1909	Elected in 1904. [data missing]	San Francisco
John P. Hare (San Francisco)	Democratic	January 4, 1909 – January 6, 1913	Elected in 1908. [data missing]	San Francisco
Thomas F. Finn (San Francisco)	Republican	January 6, 1913 – January 8, 1917	Elected in 1912. [data missing]	San Francisco
Walter A. McDonald (San Francisco)	Republican	January 8, 1917 – January 5, 1925	Elected in 1916. [data missing]	San Francisco
Thomas A. Maloney (San Francisco)	Republican	January 5, 1925 – January 2, 1933	Elected in 1924. Re-elected in 1928. Retired to run for State Assembly.	San Francisco
Bert B. Snyder (Chico)	Republican	January 2, 1933 – January 4, 1937	Elected in 1932. Lost re-election.	Santa Cruz
James B. Holohan (Watsonville).	Democratic	January 4, 1937 – January 6, 1941	Elected in 1936. [data missing]	Santa Cruz
H. R. Judah (Santa Cruz)	Republican	January 6, 1941 – January 5, 1953	Elected in 1940. Re-elected in 1944. Re-elected in 1948. [data missing]	Santa Cruz
Donald L. Grunsky (Santa Cruz)	Republican	January 5, 1953 – January 2, 1967	Elected in 1952. Re-elected in 1956. Re-elected in 1960. Re-elected in 1964. Redistricted to the 17th district.	San Benito, Santa Cruz
Lou Cusanovich (Westlake Village)	Republican	January 2, 1967 – November 30, 1976	Elected in 1966. Re-elected in 1970. Re-elected in 1974. Redistricted to the 19th district.	Los Angeles
David Roberti (Los Angeles)	Democratic	December 6, 1976 – July 2, 1992	Redistricted from the 27th district and re-elected in 1976. Re-elected in 1980. Re-elected in 1984. Re-elected in 1988. Resigned to assume seat in 20th district.	Los Angeles
Vacant		July 2, 1992 – December 7, 1992		Los Angeles
Tom Hayden (Los Angeles)	Democratic	December 7, 1992 – November 30, 2000	Elected in 1992. Re-elected in 1996. Retired due to term limits.	Los Angeles
Sheila Kuehl (Santa Monica)	Democratic	December 4, 2000 – November 30, 2008	Elected in 2000. Re-elected in 2004. Retired due to term limits.	Los Angeles
Fran Pavley (Agoura Hills)	Democratic	December 1, 2008 – November 30, 2012	Elected in 2008. Redistricted to the 27th district.	Los Angeles, Ventura
Bill Emmerson (Redlands)	Republican	December 3, 2012 – December 1, 2013	Redistricted from the 37th district and Re-elected in 2012. Resigned.	Los Angeles, Riverside, San Bernardino
Vacant		December 1, 2013 – April 3, 2014		Los Angeles, Riverside, San Bernardino
Mike Morrell (Rancho Cucamonga)	Republican	April 3, 2014 – November 30, 2020	Elected to finish Emmerson's term. Re-elected in 2016. Retired due to term limits.	Los Angeles, Riverside, San Bernardino
Rosilicie; Ochoa Bogh (Yucaipa)	Republican	December 7, 2020 – November 30, 2024	Elected in 2020. Redistricted to the 19th district.	Los Angeles, Riverside, San Bernardino
Suzette Martinez; Valladares (Santa Clarita)	Republican	December 2, 2024 – present	Elected in 2024.	Los Angeles, Riverside, San Bernardino

== Election results (1990-present) ==
=== 2024 ===
2024 California State Senate 23rd district election
Primary election
Party	Candidate	Votes	%
Republican	Suzette Martinez Valladares	50,937	32.8
Democratic	Kipp Mueller	45,754	29.4
Republican	James "DJ" Hamburger	37,075	23.8
Democratic	Blanca Azucena Gomez	14,257	9.2
Democratic	Ollie M. McCaulley	7,439	4.8
Total votes		155,462	100.0
General election
Republican	Suzette Martinez Valladares	190,957	52.4
Democratic	Kipp Mueller	173,695	47.6
Total votes		364,652	100.0
Republican hold			

=== 2020 ===
2020 California State Senate 23rd district election
Primary election
Party	Candidate	Votes	%
Democratic	Abigail Medina	59,881	28.1
Republican	Rosilicie Ochoa Bogh	52,820	24.8
Republican	Lloyd White	46,267	21.7
Democratic	Kris Goodfellow	37,153	17.4
Republican	Cristina Puraci	17,028	8.0
Total votes		213,149	100.0
General election
Republican	Rosilicie Ochoa Bogh	224,945	52.5
Democratic	Abigail Medina	203,403	47.5
Total votes		428,348	100.0
Republican hold			

=== 2016 ===
2016 California State Senate 23rd district election
Primary election
Party	Candidate	Votes	%
Republican	Mike Morrell (incumbent)	93,484	54.8
Democratic	Ronald J. O'Donnell	50,850	29.8
Democratic	Mark Westwood	26,300	15.4
Total votes		170,634	100.0
General election
Republican	Mike Morrell (incumbent)	184,470	56.6
Democratic	Ronald J. O'Donnell	141,533	43.4
Total votes		326,003	100.0
Republican hold			

=== 2014 (special) ===
2014 California State Senate 23rd district special election Vacancy resulting from the resignation of Bill Emmerson
Primary election
Party	Candidate	Votes	%
Republican	Mike Morrell	43,447	62.6
Democratic	Ronald J. O'Donnell	10,531	15.2
Democratic	Ameenah Fuller	6,705	9.7
Libertarian	Jeff Hewitt	4,479	6.5
Republican	Crystal Ruiz	4,187	6.0
Total votes		69,349	100.0
Republican hold			

=== 2012 ===
2012 California State Senate 23rd district election
Primary election
Party	Candidate	Votes	%
Republican	Bill Emmerson (incumbent)	70,465	65.0
Democratic	Melissa Ruth O'Donnell	37,939	35.0
Total votes		108,404	100.0
General election
Republican	Bill Emmerson (incumbent)	159,045	56.3
Democratic	Melissa Ruth O'Donnell	123,518	43.7
Total votes		282,563	100.0
Republican gain from Democratic			

=== 2008 ===
2008 California State Senate 23rd district election
Party	Candidate	Votes	%
Democratic	Fran Pavley	238,172	67.4
Republican	Rick Montaine	96,274	27.2
Libertarian	Colin Goldman	18,906	5.4
Total votes		353,352	100.0
Democratic hold			

=== 2004 ===
2004 California State Senate 23rd district election
Party	Candidate	Votes	%
Democratic	Sheila Kuehl (incumbent)	229,321	65.7
Republican	Leonard Michael Lanzi	101,648	29.1
Libertarian	Colin Goldman	18,168	5.2
Total votes		349,137	100.0
Democratic hold			

=== 2000 ===
2000 California State Senate 23rd district election
Party	Candidate	Votes	%
Democratic	Sheila Kuehl	225,736	70.6
Republican	Daniel B. Rego	79,009	24.7
Libertarian	Charles T. Black	15,059	4.7
Total votes		319,804	100.0
Democratic hold			

=== 1996 ===
1996 California State Senate 23rd district election
Party	Candidate	Votes	%
Democratic	Tom Hayden (incumbent)	172,295	56.2
Republican	Scott L. Schreiber	101,876	34.4
Peace and Freedom	Shirley Rachel Isaacson	11,731	4.0
Libertarian	Charles T. Black	7,438	2.5
Natural Law	Robert P. Swanson	2,722	0.9
Total votes		296,062	100.0
Democratic hold			

=== 1992 ===
1992 California State Senate 23rd district election
Party	Candidate	Votes	%
Democratic	Tom Hayden	198,425	55.9
Republican	Leonard H. "Len" McRoskey	117,455	33.1
Peace and Freedom	Shirley Rachel Isaacson	27,976	7.9
Libertarian	R. William Weilburg	11,160	3.1
No party	Joseph Alexander Cota (write-in)	8	0.0
Total votes		355,024	100.0
Democratic hold			

== See also ==
- California State Senate
- California State Senate districts
- Districts in California
