= Cristina Garcia (politician) =

American politician from California

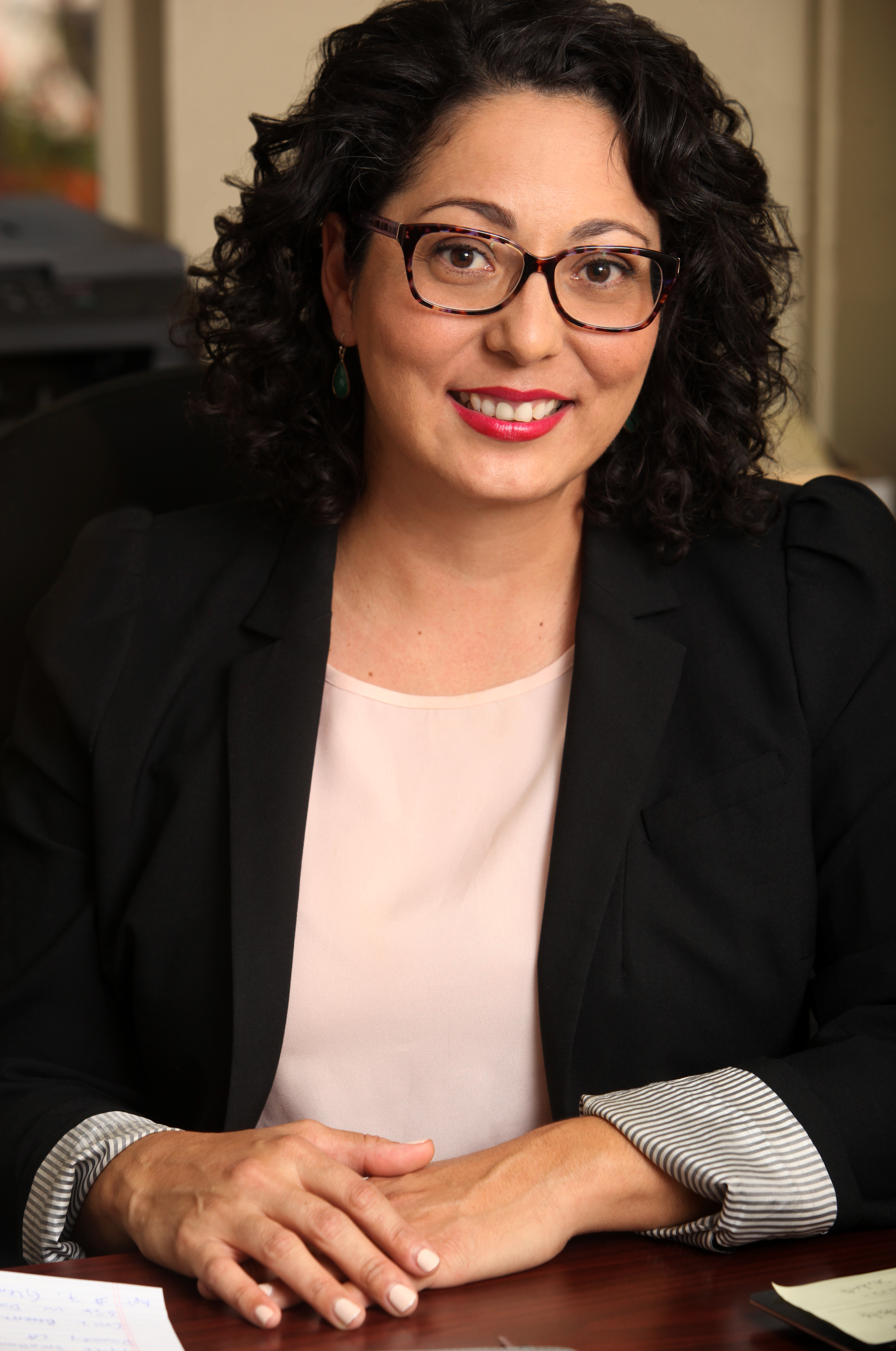
- Garcia in 2018

Member of the California State Assembly from the 58th district
- In office December 3, 2012 – December 5, 2022
- Preceded by: Charles Calderon
- Succeeded by: Sabrina Cervantes (redistricting)

Personal details
- Born: August 22, 1977 (age 48) Bell Gardens, California, U.S.
- Party: Democratic
- Education: Pomona College (BA); Claremont Graduate University (MA); University of Southern California

Cristina Garcia (born August 22, 1977) is an American educator and politician who served in the California State Assembly. She is a Democrat who represented the 58th Assembly District, which encompassed parts of southeastern Los Angeles County, including her home city of Bell Gardens. She had served in the Assembly since 2012.

While Garcia had been involved in politics in high school, where she organized opposition to Proposition 187, after college she became a teacher. In the late 2000s, tired of what seemed to her to be inaction by the Bell Gardens city council, she began attending its meetings and questioning its members. A bid to get elected to council herself failed, but a friend who lived in neighboring Bell asked her if she could attend that city's council meetings and help her figure out why its property taxes were so high. The investigations they did led to a municipal corruption scandal in which several city officials were found to have enriched themselves at public expense, and were imprisoned.

In 2012, Garcia defeated Tom Calderon, a former assemblyman, in the primary and went on to defeat her Republican opponent in the general election for the 58th District seat. She was re-elected in 2014, 2016, 2018 and 2020. In December 2021, Garcia announced she was running in the primary for the newly created 42nd Congressional District that will stretch from Long Beach to Downtown Los Angeles; she lost the June 7 primary, finishing in third place.

== Early life ==
Garcia was raised in Bell Gardens, California, one of a number of largely Latino working-class suburbs in Southeast Los Angeles County. Her parents, who were from Mexico, divorced when Garcia's mother was pregnant with her. Her mother worked making clothes in a sweatshop, raising her four children in a one bedroom apartment. Later, Garcia's mother started her own clothing manufacturing business and remarried. Investments in other businesses and properties followed, and though they were upwardly mobile, the family stayed in Bell Gardens.

=== Prop 187 opposition ===
While still in high school, Garcia and a friend organized opposition to Proposition 187, a statewide ballot measure championed by then-governor Pete Wilson that sought to establish a state-run citizenship screening system and prohibit undocumented residents from receiving non-emergency health care, public education and other services in California. Although Prop 187 passed in November 1994, it was later found unconstitutional and never implemented.

=== Education ===
Growing up, Garcia was a self-described math nerd. She went to Pomona College, where she studied both math and politics. She spent her junior year studying in Prague as the Czech Republic, after years of Soviet rule, took its first steps toward democracy in the wake of the Velvet Revolution. Later, she earned a teaching credential and a master's degree from Claremont Graduate School, and is a doctoral candidate in public administration at USC.

== Early career ==
After graduation, Cristina taught math and statistics for 12 years, first in a Los Angeles public high school, then at L.A. City College, and at USC where she taught statistics.

== Anti-corruption advocacy ==
After her mother suffered a heart attack in 2009, the thirty year-old Garcia moved back to Bell Gardens to help care for her parents (her stepfather was already struggling with diabetes). She has admitted to being frustrated with the move because, like many ambitious young people from the area, she had felt success meant "leaving and never coming back."

=== Bell Gardens activism ===
She complained regularly about the city's lack of services and economic development, until she took her sister's advice to stop griping and do something about it. She became a regular at City Council meetings, turning into an agitator and a gadfly. She studied budgets, learned how to make Public Records Act requests, tracked the compensation city officials received, and demanded fiscal responsibility.

In 2009, Garcia ran for Bell Gardens city council, but fell 114 votes short of getting one of the three open seats.

=== City of Bell corruption ===
At about the same time, activists in the neighboring city of Bell, California were growing concerned about rising local property taxes, and what their money was going toward. One of them asked Garcia for help, and she started digging into Bell's finances. Los Angeles Times reporter Jeff Gottlieb said Garcia was one of the first people he interviewed about corruption in Bell— "Talking to Cristina and others, you got a feeling that there was something wrong in Bell".

==== BASTA ====
On Thursday, July 15, 2010, the Los Angeles Times broke its first story on the corruption in Bell. Headlined "Is A City Manager Worth $800,000?" it detailed the exorbitant salaries Robert Rizzo and other Bell city officials were paid. (For their coverage of the corruption in Bell, Times reporters Jeff Gottlieb and Ruben Vives were awarded the 2011 Pulitzer Prize for Public Service.)

That night, Garcia and local businessman Ali Saleh—with Dale Walker and Denise Rodarte joining the next day— founded a group that would come to be called BASTA—an acronym for the Bell Association to Stop the Abuse, and in Spanish, ENOUGH!

Garcia became the chief spokesperson for the grassroots movement that, according to BASTA political consultant Leo Briones, did 60 press releases in a year. In a city where the electorate was known for apathy, the group drew hundreds of residents to town hall meetings, covered the city with overnight flyer blitzes, staged rallies and flooded council meetings with thousands of angry residents.

==== Bell recall ====
After the mayor and targeted council members refused to step down, BASTA organized a recall effort in August 2010 and started collecting signatures to put the measure before the voters. In March 2011, the effort succeeded in ousting Mayor Oscar Hernandez and council members Teresa Jacobo, George Mirabal, as well as Luis Artiga, who had resigned but remained on the ballot.

==== Rizzo and corrupt officials sentenced ====
On April 16, 2014, former city administrator Robert Rizzo was sentenced to 12 years in state prison and ordered to pay $8.8 million in restitution to the city of Bell—in addition to the 33 month federal prison sentence he had already received for tax fraud. In all, seven officials received sentences and fines, including an 11 years and eight months prison sentence for Rizzo's assistant city manager, Angela Spaccia.

== California Assembly ==
In 2012, Cristina won a seat in the California Assembly with an upset victory over former Assemblyman Tom Calderon in the Democratic Primary, and garnered 71.5% of the vote despite being outspent by a margin of 7 to 1 against her Republican opponent.

=== Calderon resignation advocacy ===
In 2013, Garcia was the first member of the California Legislature to call for then State Senator Ron Calderon to resign from office after an unsealed FBI affidavit and subsequent news reports surfaced of possible corruption. Calderon was the most powerful member of a political dynasty for decades in California that included his brothers, former state assembly members Tom Calderon and Charles Calderon, and his nephew, current state Assemblyman Ian Calderon.

In October 2016, Ron Calderon was sentenced to 42 months and admitted in a plea deal of accepting tens of thousands of dollars from undercover FBI agents and a hospital executive. Tom Calderon was sentenced to a year in federal custody for laundering bribes taken by his brother.

A judge's recommendation in August 2017 that Ron Calderon be considered for early release drew outrage from Garcia who said, "Granting his request ... after only serving seven months in a white-collar facility—is an added insult to my community and a void of justice in our democracy."

=== #MeToo advocacy and sexual misconduct allegations ===
In 2017, Garcia became recognized as a strong voice in the #MeToo movement. In an interview with The New York Times, Garcia revealed that she had been repeatedly sexually harassed by men during her legislative career, and later co-signed a letter calling for an end to workplace harassment of women. She has also said that some members of the California Assembly are not attentive during sexual harassment training that is conducted by legislative staff. She was one of a number of people whose pictures were featured in Time magazine's 2017 Person of the Year issue honoring what it called "The Silence Breakers"—women (and men) who had broken their silence about experiences of sexual harassment.

In January 2018, Daniel Fierro, a former staff member for Assemblyman Ian Calderon and current head of Presidio Strategic Communications (formerly Fierro Public Affairs), a public relations and public policy consulting firm that lists Calderon as a client, claimed an intoxicated Garcia had once groped him against his will following the Assembly's annual softball game in 2014. Assembly Speaker Anthony Rendon removed Garcia from all her committee assignments, one of which, the Natural Resources Committee, she chaired. In November 2018, Rendon notified Garcia the second investigation found that a preponderance of evidence supported a finding that Garcia had encountered Fierro in an overly familiar way that she would not have if she were sober, but did not support his claim that the encounter was sexual in nature. It found her behavior violated the California Assembly's Policy Against Sexual Harassment.

An unnamed lobbyist also accused Garcia of sexual harassing him at a Sacramento political fundraiser in March 2017 while she was intoxicated, alleging that she had made inappropriate sexual proposals and attempted to grope him.

=== Committee assignments ===
As of January 2019, Garcia's committee assignments for the 2019-2020 legislative session, include Budget; Environmental Safety and Toxic Materials; Natural Resources; and Utilities and Energy.

For the 2021-2022 session, Garcia was named chair of the Budget Subcommittee No. 5 on Public Safety and co-chair of the select committee for Corporate Board and California Workforce Diversity. Garcia's membership assignments on standing committees include Banking and Finance; Budget; Budget Committee No. 6 on Budget Process, Oversight and Program Evaluation; Environmental Safety and Toxic Materials; Natural Resources; Utilities and Energy; Water, Parks, and Wildlife. Garcia was one of eight assembly members named to the Joint legislative Budget Committee.

In December 2020, Cristina Garcia was elected to again lead the bipartisan California Legislative Women's Caucus, made up of members of both the California Senate and Assembly, a body she had chaired up until the spring of 2018.

== 2022 run for U.S. Congress ==
On December 23, 2021, Cristina Garcia announced that she will run for the newly created 42nd District seat to join California's Congressional delegation in the U.S. Congress. The new district combines portions of two previous districts to create a majority Latino district that includes a swath of Long Beach along with areas Garcia currently represents in the California Assembly that include Bell and Downey. She lost the June 7 primary finishing in third behind educator John Briscoe and Long Beach Mayor Robert Garcia (no relation), who went on to win the general election

== Electoral history ==
=== 2012 California State Assembly ===
California's 58th State Assembly district election, 2012
Primary election
Party	Candidate	Votes	%
Republican	Patricia A. Kotze-Ramos	9,015	28.1
Democratic	Cristina Garcia	8,517	26.6
Democratic	Tom Calderon	7,290	22.7
Democratic	Luis H. Marquez	3,946	12.3
Democratic	Daniel Crespo	2,096	6.5
Democratic	Sultan "Sam" Ahmad	1,197	3.7
Total votes		32,061	100.0
General election
Democratic	Cristina Garcia	91,019	71.8
Republican	Patricia A. Kotze-Ramos	35,676	28.2
Total votes		126,695	100.0
Democratic hold			

=== 2014 California State Assembly ===
California's 58th State Assembly district election, 2014
Primary election
Party	Candidate	Votes	%
Democratic	Cristina Garcia (incumbent)	19,392	100.0
Total votes		19,392	100.0
General election
Democratic	Cristina Garcia (incumbent)	43,182	100.0
Total votes		43,182	100.0
Democratic hold			

=== 2016 California State Assembly ===
California's 58th State Assembly district election, 2016
Primary election
Party	Candidate	Votes	%
Democratic	Cristina Garcia (incumbent)	56,052	100.0
Republican	Ramiro Alvarado (write-in)	19	0.0
Total votes		56,071	100.0
General election
Democratic	Cristina Garcia (incumbent)	105,170	75.3
Republican	Ramiro Alvarado	34,449	24.7
Total votes		139,619	100.0
Democratic hold			

=== 2018 California State Assembly ===
On June 5, 2018, Garcia finished first in the race for the 58th California Assembly seat in California's top-two primary election. In a field that included seven Democrats, Mike Simpfenderfer, the lone Republican, finished second, setting up a race between him and Garcia in the November general election.

California's 58th State Assembly district election, 2018
Primary election
Party	Candidate	Votes	%
Democratic	Cristina Garcia (incumbent)	14,509	28.9
Republican	Mike Simpfenderfer	13,246	26.4
Democratic	Pedro Aceituno	6,386	12.7
Democratic	Karla V. Salazar	4,603	9.2
Democratic	Friné (Lore) Medrano	4,447	8.9
Democratic	Ivan Altamirano	3,809	7.6
Democratic	John Paul Drayer	1,653	3.3
Democratic	Miguel Angel Alvarado	1,568	3.1
Total votes		50,221	100.0
General election
Democratic	Cristina Garcia (incumbent)	84,003	70.4
Republican	Mike Simpfenderfer	35,301	29.6
Total votes		119,304	100.0
Democratic hold			

=== 2020 California State Assembly ===
2020 California's 58th State Assembly district election
Primary election
Party	Candidate	Votes	%
Democratic	Cristina Garcia (incumbent)	55,553	77.3%
Green	Margaret Villa	16,295	22.7%
Total votes		71,848	100
General election
Democratic	Cristina Garcia (incumbent)	122,864	74.9
Green	Margaret Villa	41,100	25.1
Total votes		163,964	100
Democratic hold			

=== 2022 United States House of Representatives ===
California's 42nd congressional district, 2022
Primary election
Party	Candidate	Votes	%
Democratic	Robert Garcia	43,406	46.7
Republican	John Briscoe	24,319	26.1
Democratic	Cristina Garcia	11,685	12.6
Democratic	Peter Mathews	3,415	3.7
Democratic	Nicole López	3,164	3.4
Green	Julio Flores	2,491	2.7
Democratic	William Summerville	2,301	2.5
Democratic	Joaquín Beltrán	2,254	2.4
Total votes		93,035	100.0
