= 2020 California State Assembly election =

- November 3, 2020

All 80 seats in the California State Assembly 41 seats needed for a majority
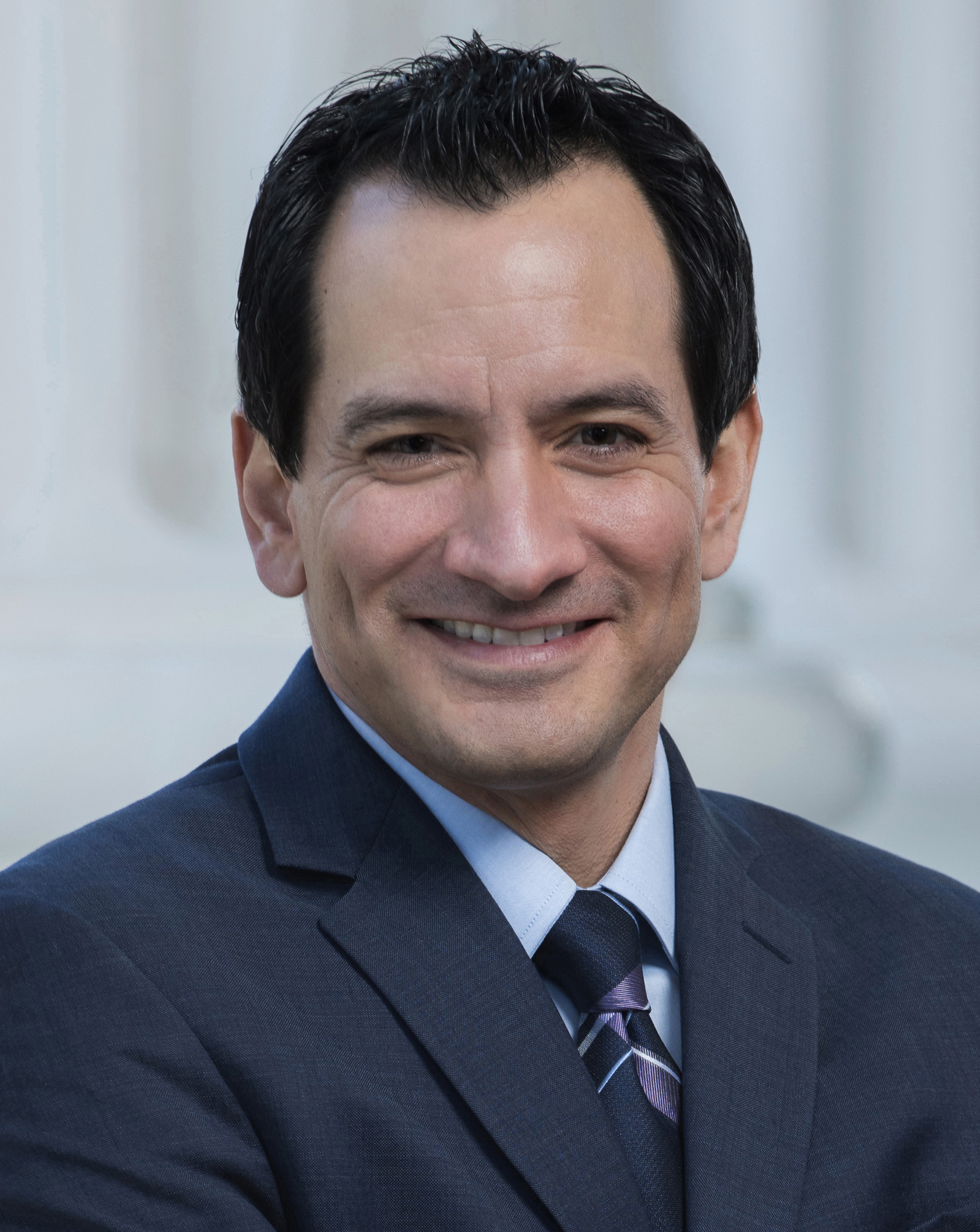

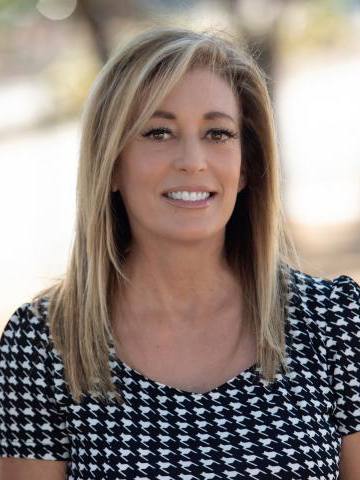

	Majority party	Minority party	Third party
Leader	Anthony Rendon	Marie Waldron
Party	Democratic	Republican	Independent
Leader since	March 7, 2016	November 8, 2018
Leader's seat	63rd–Lakewood	75th–Escondido
Last election	60 seats, 66.76%	20 seats, 31.47%	0 seats, 0.54%
Seats before	61	18	1
Seats won	60	19	1
Seat change	▼1	▲1	Steady
Popular vote	10,091,733	5,708,733	157,091
Percentage	62.78%	35.51%	0.98%
Swing	▼3.98pp	▲4.04pp	▲0.07pp
- Republican gain Democratic hold Republican hold Independent hold 50–60% 60–70% 70–80% 80–90% >90% 50–60% 60–70% 70–80% >90% 50–60%
Speaker before election
Anthony Rendon
Democratic
Elected Speaker
Anthony Rendon
Democratic

The 2020 California State Assembly election was held on Tuesday, November 3, 2020, with the primary election being held on March 3, 2020. Voters in the 80 districts of the California State Assembly elected their representatives. The elections coincided with the elections for other offices, including for U.S. president and the state senate.

== Predictions ==
Source	Ranking	As of
The Cook Political Report	Safe D	October 21, 2020
Sabato's Crystal Ball	Safe D	May 7, 2020

== Overview ==
=== Primary ===
2020 California State Assembly election Primary election — March 3, 2020
Party	Votes	Percentage	Candidates	Advancing to general	Seats contesting
Democratic	5,609,968	65.23%	132	86	75
Republican	2,873,709	33.41%	83	65	63
No party preference	83,801	0.97%	5	2	2
Green	16,295	0.19%	1	1	1
Peace and Freedom	10,107	0.12%	1	0	0
Libertarian	6,467	0.07%	3	2	2
Valid votes	8,600,347	88.88%	—	—	—
Invalid votes	1,086,729	11.22%	—	—	—
Totals	9,687,076	100.00%	223		—
Voter turnout	46.89% (registered voters)				

=== Election ===
2020 California State Assembly election General election — November 3, 2020
Party	Votes	Percentage	Seats	+/–
Democratic	10,090,713	62.77	60	▼1
Republican	5,708,733	35.51	19	▲1
Libertarian	76,377	0.48	0	Steady
Green	41,100	0.26	0	Steady
Independents	157,091	0.98	1	▲1
Valid votes	16,074,014	90.38	—	—
Invalid votes	1,711,137	9.62	—	—
Totals	17,785,151	100	80	—
Registered voter/turnout	22,047,448	80.67		

== Retiring incumbents ==
- 13th: Susan Eggman (D–Stockton): Retiring to run for California State Senate
- 25th: Kansen Chu (D–San Jose): Retiring to run for the Santa Clara County Board of Supervisors
- 33rd: Jay Obernolte (R–Big Bear Lake): Retiring to run for Congress
- 37th: Monique Limón (D–Santa Barbara): Retiring to run for California State Senate
- 38th: Christy Smith (D–Santa Clarita): Retiring to run for Congress
- 57th: Ian Calderon (D–Whittier): Retiring
- 67th: Melissa Melendez (R–Lake Elsinore): Retiring to run for California State Senate
- 78th: Todd Gloria (D–San Diego): Retiring to run for mayor of San Diego

== Results ==
Source: Official results.

=== District 1 ===
2020 California's 1st State Assembly district election
Primary election
Party	Candidate	Votes	%
Republican	Megan Dahle (incumbent)	83,883	51.0
Democratic	Elizabeth L. Betancourt	64,948	39.5
No party preference	PK "Paul" Dhanuka	15,630	9.5
Total votes		164,461	100.0
General election
Republican	Megan Dahle (incumbent)	146,902	58.9
Democratic	Elizabeth L. Betancourt	102,541	41.1
Total votes		249,443	100.0
Republican hold			

=== District 2 ===
2020 California's 2nd State Assembly district election
Primary election
Party	Candidate	Votes	%
Democratic	Jim Wood (incumbent)	112,839	70.8
Republican	Charlotte Svolos	46,439	29.2
Total votes		159,278	100.0
General election
Democratic	Jim Wood (incumbent)	162,287	68.5
Republican	Charlotte Svolos	74,582	31.5
Total votes		236,869	100.0
Democratic hold			

=== District 3 ===
2020 California's 3rd State Assembly district election
Primary election
Party	Candidate	Votes	%
Republican	James Gallagher (incumbent)	83,022	65.3
Democratic	James R. Henson	44,107	34.7
Total votes		127,129	100.0
General election
Republican	James Gallagher (incumbent)	117,314	57.4
Democratic	James R. Henson	87,045	42.6
Total votes		204,359	100.0
Republican hold			

=== District 4 ===
2020 California's 4th State Assembly district election
Primary election
Party	Candidate	Votes	%
Democratic	Cecilia Aguiar-Curry (incumbent)	83,861	58.5
Republican	Matthew L. Nelson	42,960	30.0
Democratic	Sophia Racke	16,570	11.6
Total votes		143,391	100.0
General election
Democratic	Cecilia Aguiar-Curry (incumbent)	150,153	66.7
Republican	Matthew L. Nelson	75,108	33.3
Total votes		225,261	100.0
Democratic hold			

=== District 5 ===
2020 California's 5th State Assembly district election
Primary election
Party	Candidate	Votes	%
Republican	Frank Bigelow (incumbent)	104,807	100.0
Total votes		104,807	100.0
General election
Republican	Frank Bigelow (incumbent)	165,624	100.0
Total votes		165,624	100.0
Republican hold			

=== District 6 ===
2020 California's 6th State Assembly district election
Primary election
Party	Candidate	Votes	%
Republican	Kevin Kiley (incumbent)	104,412	58.0
Democratic	Jackie Smith	75,557	42.0
Total votes		179,669	100.0
General election
Republican	Kevin Kiley (incumbent)	178,559	59.0
Democratic	Jackie Smith	124,294	41.0
Total votes		302,853	100.0
Republican hold			

=== District 7 ===
2020 California's 7th State Assembly district election
Primary election
Party	Candidate	Votes	%
Democratic	Kevin McCarty (incumbent)	88,869	99.8
Libertarian	James O. Just (write-in)	199	0.2
Total votes		89,068	100.0
General election
Democratic	Kevin McCarty (incumbent)	149,083	73.9
Libertarian	James O. Just	52,543	26.1
Total votes		201,626	100.0
Democratic hold			

=== District 8 ===
2020 California's 8th State Assembly district election
Primary election
Party	Candidate	Votes	%
Democratic	Ken Cooley (incumbent)	73,444	57.0
Republican	Cathy Cook	55,376	43.0
Total votes		128,820	100.0
General election
Democratic	Ken Cooley (incumbent)	126,969	55.1
Republican	Cathy Cook	103,496	44.9
Total votes		230,465	100.0
Democratic hold			

=== District 9 ===
2020 California's 9th State Assembly district election
Primary election
Party	Candidate	Votes	%
Democratic	Jim Cooper (incumbent)	50,609	43.8
Republican	Eric M. Rigard	33,997	29.4
Democratic	Tracie Stafford	27,974	24.2
Democratic	Mushtaq A. Tahirkheli	3,015	2.6
Total votes		115,595	100.0
General election
Democratic	Jim Cooper (incumbent)	142,088	65.8
Republican	Eric M. Rigard	73,742	34.2
Total votes		215,830	100.0
Democratic hold			

=== District 10 ===
2020 California's 10th State Assembly district election
Primary election
Party	Candidate	Votes	%
Democratic	Marc Levine (incumbent)	112,683	62.0
Democratic	Veronica "Roni" Jacobi	32,663	18.0
Republican	Ron Sondergaard	31,284	17.2
Democratic	Ted Cabral	5,192	2.9
Total votes		181,822	100.0
General election
Democratic	Marc Levine (incumbent)	158,263	65.7
Democratic	Veronica "Roni" Jacobi	82,638	34.3
Total votes		240,901	100.0
Democratic hold			

=== District 11 ===
2020 California's 11th State Assembly district election
Primary election
Party	Candidate	Votes	%
Democratic	Jim Frazier (incumbent)	83,125	98.8
Republican	Debra Schwab (write in)	1,044	1.2
Total votes		84,169	100.0
General election
Democratic	Jim Frazier (incumbent)	149,304	64.7
Republican	Debra Schwab	81,374	35.3
Total votes		230,678	100.0
Democratic hold			

=== District 12 ===
2020 California's 12th State Assembly district election
Primary election
Party	Candidate	Votes	%
Republican	Heath Flora (incumbent)	71,098	62.9
Democratic	Paul Akinjo	41,859	37.1
Total votes		112,957	100.0
General election
Republican	Heath Flora (incumbent)	131,625	60.9
Democratic	Paul Akinjo	84,373	39.1
Total votes		215,998	100.0
Republican hold			

=== District 13 ===
2020 California's 13th State Assembly district election
Primary election
Party	Candidate	Votes	%
Democratic	Carlos Villapudua	27,068	35.9
Democratic	Kathy Miller	24,091	31.9
Democratic	Christina Fugazi	24,061	31.9
Republican	Khalid Jeffrey Jafri (write-in)	210	0.3
Total votes		75,430	100.0
General election
Democratic	Carlos Villapudua	83,746	51.6
Democratic	Kathy Miller	78,609	48.4
Total votes		162,355	100.0
Democratic hold			

=== District 14 ===
2020 California's 14th State Assembly district election
Primary election
Party	Candidate	Votes	%
Democratic	Tim Grayson (incumbent)	82,052	66.4
Republican	Janell Elizabeth Proctor	31,477	25.5
Peace and Freedom	Cassandra Devereaux	10,107	8.2
Total votes		123,636	100.0
General election
Democratic	Tim Grayson (incumbent)	163,205	70.3
Republican	Janell Elizabeth Proctor	68,819	29.7
Total votes		232,024	100.0
Democratic hold			

=== District 15 ===
2020 California's 15th State Assembly district election
Primary election
Party	Candidate	Votes	%
Democratic	Buffy Wicks (incumbent)	135,623	83.6
No party preference	Sara Brink	13,841	8.5
Republican	Jeanne M. Solnordal	12,791	7.9
Total votes		162,255	100.0
General election
Democratic	Buffy Wicks (incumbent)	204,108	84.7
No party preference	Sara Brink	36,732	15.3
Total votes		240,840	100.0
Democratic hold			

=== District 16 ===
2020 California's 16th State Assembly district election
Primary election
Party	Candidate	Votes	%
Democratic	Rebecca Bauer-Kahan (incumbent)	109,852	68.3
Republican	Joseph A. Rubay	51,097	31.7
Total votes		160,949	100.0
General election
Democratic	Rebecca Bauer-Kahan (incumbent)	192,977	67.4
Republican	Joseph A. Rubay	93,137	32.6
Total votes		286,114	100.0
Democratic hold			

=== District 17 ===
2020 California's 17th State Assembly district election
Primary election
Party	Candidate	Votes	%
Democratic	David Chiu (incumbent)	120,498	99.95
Libertarian	Starchild (write in)	56	0.05
Total votes		120,554	100.0
General election
Democratic	David Chiu (incumbent)	190,731	88.9
Libertarian	Starchild	23,834	11.1
Total votes		214,565	100.0
Democratic hold			

=== District 18 ===
2020 California's 18th State Assembly district election
Primary election
Party	Candidate	Votes	%
Democratic	Rob Bonta (incumbent)	118,300	89.3
Republican	Stephen Slauson	14,158	10.7
Total votes		132,458	100.0
General election
Democratic	Rob Bonta (incumbent)	190,168	87.6
Republican	Stephen Slauson	26,942	12.4
Total votes		217,110	100.0
Democratic hold			

=== District 19 ===
2020 California's 19th State Assembly district election
Primary election
Party	Candidate	Votes	%
Democratic	Phil Ting (incumbent)	111,464	82.0
Republican	John P. McDonnell	24,530	18.0
Total votes		135,994	100.0
General election
Democratic	Phil Ting (incumbent)	175,847	77.6
Republican	John P. McDonnell	50,845	22.4
Total votes		226,692	100.0
Democratic hold			

=== District 20 ===
2020 California's 20th State Assembly district election
Primary election
Party	Candidate	Votes	%
Democratic	Bill Quirk (incumbent)	42,606	47.1
Democratic	Alexis Villalobos	19,900	22.0
Republican	Son Nguyen	18,410	20.4
Democratic	Vipan Singh Bajwa	9,463	10.5
Total votes		90,379	100.0
General election
Democratic	Bill Quirk (incumbent)	100,105	56.9
Democratic	Alexis Villalobos	75,672	43.1
Total votes		175,777	100.0
Democratic hold			

=== District 21 ===
2020 California's 21st State Assembly district election
Primary election
Party	Candidate	Votes	%
Democratic	Adam Gray (incumbent)	54,987	99.0
Republican	Joel Gutierrez Campos (write in)	300	0.5
Republican	Guadalupe Salazar (write in)	256	0.5
Total votes		55,543	100.0
General election
Democratic	Adam Gray (incumbent)	93,816	59.6
Republican	Joel Gutierrez Campos	63,514	40.4
Total votes		157,330	100.0
Democratic hold			

=== District 22 ===
2020 California's 22nd State Assembly district election
Primary election
Party	Candidate	Votes	%
Democratic	Kevin Mullin (incumbent)	107,738	75.7
Republican	Mark Gilham	17,942	12.6
Republican	Bridget Mahoney	16,606	11.7
Total votes		142,286	100.0
General election
Democratic	Kevin Mullin (incumbent)	182,365	75.4
Republican	Mark Gilham	59,511	24.6
Total votes		241,876	100.0
Democratic hold			

=== District 23 ===
2020 California's 23rd State Assembly district election
Primary election
Party	Candidate	Votes	%
Republican	Jim Patterson (incumbent)	101,217	100.0
Total votes		101,217	100.0
General election
Republican	Jim Patterson (incumbent)	177,600	100.0
Total votes		177,600	100.0
Republican hold			

=== District 24 ===
2020 California's 24th State Assembly district election
Primary election
Party	Candidate	Votes	%
Democratic	Marc Berman (incumbent)	99,642	74.2
Republican	Peter Ohtaki	28,408	21.2
Libertarian	Kennita Watson	6,212	4.6
Total votes		134,262	100.0
General election
Democratic	Marc Berman (incumbent)	158,240	73.4
Republican	Peter Ohtaki	57,212	26.6
Total votes		215,452	100.0
Democratic hold			

=== District 25 ===
2020 California's 25th State Assembly district election
Primary election
Party	Candidate	Votes	%
Republican	Bob Brunton	19,612	20.8
Democratic	Alex Lee	14,542	15.4
Democratic	Anne Kepner	12,823	13.6
Democratic	Anna Song	11,992	12.7
Democratic	Natasha Gupta	9,778	10.4
Democratic	Carmen Montano	9,672	10.2
Democratic	Anthony Phan	6,780	7.2
Democratic	Roman Reed	5,549	5.9
Democratic	Jim Canova	3,623	3.8
Total votes		94,371	100.0
General election
Democratic	Alex Lee	135,733	70.5
Republican	Bob Brunton	56,775	29.5
Total votes		192,508	100.0
Democratic hold			

=== District 26 ===
2020 California's 26th State Assembly district election
Primary election
Party	Candidate	Votes	%
Republican	Devon Mathis (incumbent)	49,413	61.5
Democratic	Drew Phelps	30,981	38.5
Total votes		80,394	100.0
General election
Republican	Devon Mathis (incumbent)	85,005	54.9
Democratic	Drew Phelps	69,717	45.1
Total votes		154,722	100.0
Republican hold			

=== District 27 ===
2020 California's 27th State Assembly district election
Primary election
Party	Candidate	Votes	%
Democratic	Ash Kalra (incumbent)	66,324	75.7
Republican	G. Burt Lancaster	21,323	24.3
Total votes		87,647	100.0
General election
Democratic	Ash Kalra (incumbent)	127,772	72.6
Republican	G. Burt Lancaster	48,112	27.4
Total votes		175,884	100.0
Democratic hold			

=== District 28 ===
2020 California's 28th State Assembly district election
Primary election
Party	Candidate	Votes	%
Democratic	Evan Low (incumbent)	96,976	71.1
Republican	Carlos Rafael Cruz	32,136	23.5
No party preference	Sam Ross	7,350	5.4
Total votes		136,462	100.0
General election
Democratic	Evan Low (incumbent)	166,733	71.6
Republican	Carlos Rafael Cruz	65,976	28.4
Total votes		232,709	100.0
Democratic hold			

=== District 29 ===
2020 California's 29th State Assembly district election
Primary election
Party	Candidate	Votes	%
Democratic	Mark Stone (incumbent)	124,519	75.8
Republican	Shomir Banerjee	39,835	24.2
Total votes		164,354	100.0
General election
Democratic	Mark Stone (incumbent)	185,496	73.0
Republican	Shomir Banerjee	68,772	27.0
Total votes		254,268	100.0
Democratic hold			

=== District 30 ===
2020 California's 30th State Assembly district election
Primary election
Party	Candidate	Votes	%
Democratic	Robert Rivas (incumbent)	64,086	69.4
Republican	Gregory Swett	28,308	30.6
Total votes		92,394	100.0
General election
Democratic	Robert Rivas (incumbent)	123,617	69.6
Republican	Gregory Swett	53,928	30.4
Total votes		177,545	100.0
Democratic hold			

=== District 31 ===
2020 California's 31st State Assembly district election
Primary election
Party	Candidate	Votes	%
Democratic	Joaquin Arambula (incumbent)	38,317	61.7
Republican	Fernando Banuelos	23,743	38.3
Total votes		62,060	100.0
General election
Democratic	Joaquin Arambula (incumbent)	77,193	61.9
Republican	Fernando Banuelos	47,551	38.1
Total votes		124,744	100.0
Democratic hold			

=== District 32 ===
2020 California's 32nd State Assembly district election
Primary election
Party	Candidate	Votes	%
Democratic	Rudy Salas (incumbent)	27,679	58.1
Republican	Todd Cotta	19,957	41.9
Total votes		47,636	100.0
General election
Democratic	Rudy Salas (incumbent)	63,450	60.0
Republican	Todd Cotta	42,328	40.0
Total votes		105,778	100.0
Democratic hold			

=== District 33 ===
2020 California's 33rd State Assembly district election
Primary election
Party	Candidate	Votes	%
Republican	Thurston Smith	32,891	37.9
Republican	Rick Herrick	14,922	17.2
Democratic	Socorro Cisneros	12,136	14.0
Democratic	Blanca A. Gomez	8,950	10.3
Democratic	Anthony A. Rhoades	7,670	8.8
Democratic	Roger La Plante	5,655	6.5
Republican	Alex Walton	4,564	5.3
Total votes		86,788	100.0
General election
Republican	Thurston Smith	86,948	54.9
Republican	Rick Herrick	71,567	45.1
Total votes		158,515	100.0
Republican hold			

=== District 34 ===
2020 California's 34th State Assembly district election
Primary election
Party	Candidate	Votes	%
Republican	Vince Fong (incumbent)	83,909	71.6
Democratic	Julie Solis	32,922	28.1
Democratic	Regina Velasquez (write in)	343	0.3
Total votes		117,174	100.0
General election
Republican	Vince Fong (incumbent)	146,611	68.1
Democratic	Julie Solis	68,716	31.9
Total votes		215,327	100.0
Republican hold			

=== District 35 ===
2020 California's 35th State Assembly district election
Primary election
Party	Candidate	Votes	%
Republican	Jordan Cunningham (incumbent)	85,029	56.8
Democratic	Dawn Addis	64,548	43.2
Total votes		149,577	100.0
General election
Republican	Jordan Cunningham (incumbent)	126,579	55.1
Democratic	Dawn Addis	103,206	44.9
Total votes		229,785	100.0
Republican hold			

=== District 36 ===
2020 California's 36th State Assembly district election
Primary election
Party	Candidate	Votes	%
Republican	Tom Lackey (incumbent)	45,255	53.0
Democratic	Steve Fox	14,771	17.3
Democratic	Johnathon Ervin	6,615	7.8
Democratic	Diedra M. Greenaway	5,084	6.0
Democratic	Michael P. Rives	4,055	4.7
Democratic	Ollie M. McCaulley	3,729	4.4
Democratic	Lourdes Everett	3,405	4.0
Democratic	Eric Andrew Ohlsen	2,440	2.9
Total votes		85,354	100.0
General election
Republican	Tom Lackey (incumbent)	102,442	55.2
Democratic	Steve Fox	83,240	44.8
Total votes		185,682	100.0
Republican hold			

=== District 37 ===
2020 California's 37th State Assembly district election
Primary election
Party	Candidate	Votes	%
Republican	Charles W. Cole	41,945	27.5
Democratic	Steve Bennett	37,516	24.6
Democratic	Cathy Murillo	29,498	19.4
Democratic	Jonathan Abboud	12,039	7.9
Democratic	Jason Dominguez	11,177	7.3
Democratic	Elsa Granados	10,840	7.1
Democratic	Stephen Blum	9,278	6.1
Total votes		152,293	100.0
General election
Democratic	Steve Bennett	166,015	67.6
Republican	Charles W. Cole	79,661	32.4
Total votes		245,676	100.0
Democratic hold			

=== District 38 ===
2020 California's 38th State Assembly district election
Primary election
Party	Candidate	Votes	%
Republican	Suzette Martinez Valladares	39,481	31.8
Republican	Lucie Lapointe Volotzky	21,942	17.6
Democratic	Annie E. Cho	15,498	12.5
Democratic	Kelvin Driscoll	14,868	12.0
Democratic	Brandii Grace	14,387	11.6
Democratic	Dina Cervantes	10,900	8.8
Democratic	Susan M. Christopher	7,255	5.8
Total votes		124,331	100.0
General election
Republican	Suzette Martinez Valladares	149,201	76.1
Republican	Lucie Lapointe Volotzky	46,877	23.9
Total votes		196,078	100.0
Republican gain from Democratic			

=== District 39 ===
2020 California's 39th State Assembly district election
Primary election
Party	Candidate	Votes	%
Democratic	Luz Rivas (incumbent)	54,512	77.8
Republican	Ricardo Benitez	15,590	22.2
Total votes		70,102	100.0
General election
Democratic	Luz Rivas (incumbent)	117,207	74.1
Republican	Ricardo Benitez	41,033	25.9
Total votes		158,240	100.0
Democratic hold			

=== District 40 ===
2020 California's 40th State Assembly district election
Primary election
Party	Candidate	Votes	%
Democratic	James Ramos (incumbent)	54,923	59.4
Republican	Jennifer Tullius	37,590	40.6
Total votes		92,313	100.0
General election
Democratic	James Ramos (incumbent)	111,885	58.4
Republican	Jennifer Tullius	79,821	41.6
Total votes		191,706	100.0
Democratic hold			

=== District 41 ===
2020 California's 41st State Assembly district election
Primary election
Party	Candidate	Votes	%
Democratic	Chris Holden (incumbent)	94,505	68.7
Republican	Robin A. Hvidston	43,006	31.3
Total votes		137,511	100.0
General election
Democratic	Chris Holden (incumbent)	160,878	65.3
Republican	Robin A. Hvidston	85,604	34.7
Total votes		246,482	100.0
Democratic hold			

=== District 42 ===
2020 California's 42nd State Assembly district election
Primary election
Party	Candidate	Votes	%
Independent	Chad Mayes (incumbent)	42,717	35.0
Republican	Andrew Kotyuk	40,893	33.5
Democratic	DeniAntionette Mazingo	38,492	31.5
Total votes		122,102	100.0
General election
Independent	Chad Mayes (incumbent)	120,401	55.6
Republican	Andrew Kotyuk	96,203	44.4
Total votes		216,604	100.0
Independent hold			

=== District 43 ===
2020 California's 43rd State Assembly district election
Primary election
Party	Candidate	Votes	%
Democratic	Laura Friedman (incumbent)	88,541	75.6
Republican	Mike Graves	24,258	20.7
No party preference	Robert J. Sexton	4,264	3.6
Total votes		117,063	100.0
General election
Democratic	Laura Friedman (incumbent)	149,214	69.6
Republican	Mike Graves	65,270	30.4
Total votes		214,484	100.0
Democratic hold			

=== District 44 ===
2020 California's 44th State Assembly district election
Primary election
Party	Candidate	Votes	%
Democratic	Jacqui Irwin (incumbent)	73,294	62.2
Republican	Denise Pedrow	44,534	37.8
Total votes		117,828	100.0
General election
Democratic	Jacqui Irwin (incumbent)	132,679	60.7
Republican	Denise Pedrow	86,051	39.3
Total votes		218,730	100.0
Democratic hold			

=== District 45 ===
2020 California's 45th State Assembly district election
Primary election
Party	Candidate	Votes	%
Democratic	Jesse Gabriel (incumbent)	77,512	98.8
Republican	Jeffi Girgenti (write-in)	955	1.2
Democratic	Denise Feldman (write-in)	23	0.0
Total votes		78,490	100.0
General election
Democratic	Jesse Gabriel (incumbent)	136,904	66.2
Republican	Jeffi Girgenti	69,802	33.8
Total votes		206,706	100.0
Democratic hold			

=== District 46 ===
2020 California's 46th State Assembly district election
Primary election
Party	Candidate	Votes	%
Democratic	Adrin Nazarian (incumbent)	55,784	69.7
Democratic	Lanira K. Murphy	24,291	30.3
Total votes		80,075	100.0
General election
Democratic	Adrin Nazarian (incumbent)	104,987	63.4
Democratic	Lanira K. Murphy	60,595	36.6
Total votes		165,582	100.0
Democratic hold			

=== District 47 ===
2020 California's 47th State Assembly district election
Primary election
Party	Candidate	Votes	%
Democratic	Eloise Reyes (incumbent)	45,618	71.0
Republican	Matthew Gordon	18,649	29.0
Total votes		64,267	100.0
General election
Democratic	Eloise Reyes (incumbent)	109,635	69.0
Republican	Matthew Gordon	49,170	31.0
Total votes		158,805	100.0
Democratic hold			

=== District 48 ===
2020 California's 48th State Assembly district election
Primary election
Party	Candidate	Votes	%
Democratic	Blanca Rubio (incumbent)	58,432	100.0
Total votes		58,432	100.0
General election
Democratic	Blanca Rubio (incumbent)	126,430	100.0
Total votes		126,430	100.0
Democratic hold			

=== District 49 ===
2020 California's 49th State Assembly district election
Primary election
Party	Candidate	Votes	%
Democratic	Ed Chau (incumbent)	36,985	52.0
Republican	Burton Brink	17,531	24.6
Democratic	Bryan Mesinas Pérez	9,006	12.7
Democratic	Priscilla Silva	7,628	10.7
Total votes		71,150	100.0
General election
Democratic	Ed Chau (incumbent)	107,976	67.9
Republican	Burton Brink	50,988	32.1
Total votes		158,964	100.0
Democratic hold			

=== District 50 ===
2020 California's 50th State Assembly district election
Primary election
Party	Candidate	Votes	%
Democratic	Richard Bloom (incumbent)	89,797	78.7
Democratic	Will Hess	16,482	14.5
Democratic	Jim King	7,750	6.8
Total votes		114,029	100.0
General election
Democratic	Richard Bloom (incumbent)	166,503	80.4
Democratic	Will Hess	40,709	19.6
Total votes		207,212	100.0
Democratic hold			

=== District 51 ===
2020 California's 51st State Assembly district election
Primary election
Party	Candidate	Votes	%
Democratic	Wendy Carrillo (incumbent)	73,578	100.0
Total votes		73,578	100.0
General election
Democratic	Wendy Carrillo (incumbent)	127,026	100.0
Total votes		127,026	100.0
Democratic hold			

=== District 52 ===
2020 California's 52nd State Assembly district election
Primary election
Party	Candidate	Votes	%
Democratic	Freddie Rodriguez (incumbent)	47,539	68.9
Republican	Toni Holle	21,499	31.1
Democratic	Jesus Gonzalez (write-in)	18	0.0
Total votes		69,056	100.0
General election
Democratic	Freddie Rodriguez (incumbent)	112,165	68.3
Republican	Toni Holle	52,022	31.7
Total votes		164,187	100.0
Democratic hold			

=== District 53 ===
2020 California's 53rd State Assembly district election
Primary election
Party	Candidate	Votes	%
Democratic	Miguel Santiago (incumbent)	35,515	62.9
Democratic	Godfrey Santos Plata	20,923	37.1
Total votes		56,438	100.0
General election
Democratic	Miguel Santiago (incumbent)	63,776	56.3
Democratic	Godfrey Santos Plata	49,580	43.7
Total votes		113,356	100.0
Democratic hold			

=== District 54 ===
2020 California's 54th State Assembly district election
Primary election
Party	Candidate	Votes	%
Democratic	Sydney Kamlager (incumbent)	64,620	56.7
Democratic	Tracy Bernard Jones	34,005	29.8
Republican	Glen Ratcliff	10,880	9.5
Democratic	Clinton Brown	4,513	4.0
Total votes		114,018	100.0
General election
Democratic	Sydney Kamlager (incumbent)	119,818	64.2
Democratic	Tracy Bernard Jones	66,915	35.8
Total votes		186,733	100.0
Democratic hold			

=== District 55 ===
2020 California's 55th State Assembly district election
Primary election
Party	Candidate	Votes	%
Republican	Phillip Chen (incumbent)	64,785	56.2
Democratic	Andrew E. Rodriguez	50,458	43.8
Total votes		115,243	100.0
General election
Republican	Phillip Chen (incumbent)	125,212	54.9
Democratic	Andrew E. Rodriguez	102,683	45.1
Total votes		227,895	100.0
Republican hold			

=== District 56 ===
2020 California's 56th State Assembly district election
Primary election
Party	Candidate	Votes	%
Democratic	Eduardo Garcia (incumbent)	44,530	64.0
Republican	America Figueroa	25,074	36.0
Total votes		69,604	100.0
General election
Democratic	Eduardo Garcia (incumbent)	97,459	63.6
Republican	America Figueroa	55,684	36.4
Total votes		153,143	100.0
Democratic hold			

=== District 57 ===
2020 California's 57th State Assembly district election
Primary election
Party	Candidate	Votes	%
Republican	Jessica Martinez	23,752	28.7
Democratic	Lisa Calderon	16,622	20.1
Democratic	Sylvia Rubio	14,123	17.1
Democratic	Josue Alvarado	11,361	13.7
Democratic	Vanessa C. Tyson	7,121	8.6
Democratic	Primo Castro	3,156	3.8
Democratic	Gary Mendez	2,799	3.4
Democratic	Dora D. Sandoval	2,445	3.0
Democratic	Oscar Valladares	1,297	1.6
Total votes		82,676	100.0
General election
Democratic	Lisa Calderon	114,122	60.5
Republican	Jessica Martinez	74,371	39.5
Total votes		188,493	100.0
Democratic hold			

=== District 58 ===
2020 California's 58th State Assembly district election
Primary election
Party	Candidate	Votes	%
Democratic	Cristina Garcia (incumbent)	55,553	77.3
Green	Margaret Villa	16,295	22.7
Total votes		71,848	100.0
General election
Democratic	Cristina Garcia (incumbent)	122,864	74.9
Green	Margaret Villa	41,100	25.1
Total votes		163,964	100.0
Democratic hold			

=== District 59 ===
2020 California's 59th State Assembly district election
Primary election
Party	Candidate	Votes	%
Democratic	Efren Martinez	22,416	50.6
Democratic	Reggie Jones-Sawyer (incumbent)	19,873	44.9
Democratic	Marcello Villeda	1,999	4.5
Total votes		44,288	100.0
General election
Democratic	Reggie Jones-Sawyer (incumbent)	63,448	57.5
Democratic	Efren Martinez	46,853	42.5
Total votes		110,301	100.0
Democratic hold			

=== District 60 ===
2020 California's 60th State Assembly district election
Primary election
Party	Candidate	Votes	%
Democratic	Sabrina Cervantes (incumbent)	46,511	54.4
Republican	Chris Raahauge	38,968	45.6
Total votes		85,479	100.0
General election
Democratic	Sabrina Cervantes (incumbent)	109,976	56.4
Republican	Chris Raahauge	84,907	43.6
Total votes		194,883	100.0
Democratic hold			

=== District 61 ===
2020 California's 61st State Assembly district election
Primary election
Party	Candidate	Votes	%
Democratic	Jose Medina (incumbent)	51,402	66.2
Republican	Ali Mazarei	26,250	33.8
Total votes		77,652	100.0
General election
Democratic	Jose Medina (incumbent)	115,982	65.9
Republican	Ali Mazerei	59,934	34.1
Total votes		175,916	100.0
Democratic hold			

=== District 62 ===
2020 California's 62nd State Assembly district election
Primary election
Party	Candidate	Votes	%
Democratic	Autumn Burke (incumbent)	82,532	84.4
Republican	Robert A. Steele	15,273	15.6
Total votes		97,805	100.0
General election
Democratic	Autumn Burke (incumbent)	158,832	80.9
Republican	Robert A. Steele	37,500	19.1
Total votes		196,332	100.0
Democratic hold			

=== District 63 ===
2020 California's 63rd State Assembly district election
Primary election
Party	Candidate	Votes	%
Democratic	Anthony Rendon (incumbent)	32,471	58.0
Democratic	Maria D. Estrada	23,481	42.0
Total votes		55,952	100.0
General election
Democratic	Anthony Rendon (incumbent)	71,460	53.7
Democratic	Maria D. Estrada	61,611	46.3
Total votes		133,071	100.0
Democratic hold			

=== District 64 ===
2020 California's 64th State Assembly district election
Primary election
Party	Candidate	Votes	%
Democratic	Mike Gipson (incumbent)	38,324	67.5
Democratic	Fatima S. Iqbal-Zubair	18,469	32.5
Total votes		56,793	100.0
General election
Democratic	Mike Gipson (incumbent)	83,559	59.5
Democratic	Fatima S. Iqbal-Zubair	56,875	40.5
Total votes		140,434	100.0
Democratic hold			

=== District 65 ===
2020 California's 65th State Assembly district primary results and general election by county supervisorial district Map legend: Quirk-Silva—50–60%

2020 California's 65th State Assembly district election
Primary election
Party	Candidate	Votes	%
Democratic	Sharon Quirk-Silva (incumbent)	54,240	57.7
Republican	Cynthia Thacker	39,796	42.3
Total votes		94,036	100.0
General election
Democratic	Sharon Quirk-Silva (incumbent)	112,333	58.3
Republican	Cynthia Thacker	80,468	41.7
Total votes		192,801	100.0
Democratic hold			

=== District 66 ===
2020 California's 66th State Assembly district election
Primary election
Party	Candidate	Votes	%
Democratic	Al Muratsuchi (incumbent)	83,172	66.2
Republican	Arthur C. Schaper	42,536	33.8
Total votes		125,708	100.0
General election
Democratic	Al Muratsuchi (incumbent)	145,874	63.2
Republican	Arthur C. Schaper	84,867	36.8
Total votes		230,741	100.0
Democratic hold			

=== District 67 ===
2020 California's 67th State Assembly district election
Primary election
Party	Candidate	Votes	%
Democratic	Jerry Carlos	40,112	35.4
Republican	Kelly Seyarto	31,067	27.4
Republican	Jeremy Smith	19,439	17.2
Republican	Steve Manos	16,111	14.2
Republican	Nick Pardue	6,520	5.8
Total votes		113,249	100.0
General election
Republican	Kelly Seyarto	144,317	60.0
Democratic	Jerry Carlos	96,140	40.0
Total votes		240,457	100.0
Republican hold			

=== District 68 ===
2020 California's 68th State Assembly district election
Primary election
Party	Candidate	Votes	%
Republican	Steven Choi (incumbent)	57,633	43.8
Democratic	Melissa Fox	44,033	33.5
Democratic	Eugene Fields	17,332	13.2
Republican	Benjamin Yu	12,503	9.5
Total votes		131,501	100.0
General election
Republican	Steven Choi (Incumbent)	136,841	53.1
Democratic	Melissa Fox	120,965	46.9
Total votes		257,806	100.0
Republican hold			

=== District 69 ===
2020 California's 69th State Assembly district election
Primary election
Party	Candidate	Votes	%
Democratic	Tom Daly (incumbent)	44,015	73.9
Republican	Jon Paul White	15,555	26.1
Total votes		59,570	100.0
General election
Democratic	Tom Daly (incumbent)	99,731	72.9
Republican	Jon Paul White	37,065	27.1
Total votes		136,796	100.0
Democratic hold			

=== District 70 ===
2020 California's 70th State Assembly district election
Primary election
Party	Candidate	Votes	%
Democratic	Patrick O'Donnell (incumbent)	78,609	74.4
Republican	David W. Thomas	27,081	25.6
Total votes		105,690	100.0
General election
Democratic	Patrick O'Donnell (incumbent)	143,191	71.7
Republican	David W. Thomas	56,516	28.3
Total votes		199,707	100.0
Democratic hold			

=== District 71 ===
2020 California's 71st State Assembly district election
Primary election
Party	Candidate	Votes	%
Republican	Randy Voepel (incumbent)	77,069	61.1
Democratic	Liz "Elizabeth" Lavertu	49,073	38.9
Total votes		126,142	100.0
General election
Republican	Randy Voepel (incumbent)	136,156	59.6
Democratic	Liz "Elizabeth" Lavertu	92,385	40.4
Total votes		228,541	100.0
Republican hold			

=== District 72 ===
2020 California's 72nd State Assembly district primary results by county supervisorial district Map legend: J. Nguyen—40–50%

2020 California's 72nd State Assembly district election
Primary election
Party	Candidate	Votes	%
Republican	Janet Nguyen	39,778	33.8
Democratic	Diedre Nguyen	30,021	25.5
Republican	Tyler Diep (incumbent)	29,186	24.8
Democratic	Bijan Mohseni	18,668	15.9
Total votes		117,653	100.0
General election
Republican	Janet Nguyen	122,483	54.2
Democratic	Diedre Nguyen	103,707	45.8
Total votes		226,190	100.0
Republican hold			

=== District 73 ===
2020 California's 73rd State Assembly district election
Primary election
Party	Candidate	Votes	%
Republican	Laurie Davies	41,499	27.3
Democratic	Scott Rhinehart	36,170	23.8
Democratic	Chris Duncan	27,993	18.4
Republican	Bill Brough (incumbent)	25,281	16.6
Republican	Ed Sachs	21,089	13.9
Total votes		152,032	100.0
General election
Republican	Laurie Davies	161,650	58.5
Democratic	Scott Rhinehart	114,578	41.5
Total votes		276,228	100.0
Republican hold			

=== District 74 ===
2020 California's 74th State Assembly district election
Primary election
Party	Candidate	Votes	%
Democratic	Cottie Petrie-Norris (incumbent)	76,081	52.3
Republican	Diane Dixon	36,683	25.2
Republican	Kelly Ernby	32,602	22.4
Total votes		145,366	100.0
General election
Democratic	Cottie Petrie-Norris (incumbent)	133,607	50.5
Republican	Diane Dixon	131,023	49.5
Total votes		264,630	100.0
Democratic hold			

=== District 75 ===
2020 California's 75th State Assembly district election
Primary election
Party	Candidate	Votes	%
Republican	Marie Waldron (incumbent)	71,217	56.3
Democratic	Karen "Kate" Schwartz	47,988	37.9
Democratic	Roger Garcia	7,327	5.8
Total votes		126,532	100.0
General election
Republican	Marie Waldron (incumbent)	128,559	54.5
Democratic	Karen "Kate" Schwartz	107,150	45.5
Total votes		235,709	100.0
Republican hold			

=== District 76 ===
2020 California's 76th State Assembly district election
Primary election
Party	Candidate	Votes	%
Democratic	Tasha Boerner Horvath (incumbent)	77,792	57.5
Republican	Melanie Burkholder	57,391	42.5
Total votes		135,183	100.0
General election
Democratic	Tasha Boerner Horvath (incumbent)	132,668	55.6
Republican	Melanie Burkholder	105,855	44.4
Total votes		238,523	100.0
Democratic hold			

=== District 77 ===
2020 California's 77th State Assembly district election
Primary election
Party	Candidate	Votes	%
Democratic	Brian Maienschein (incumbent)	86,998	57.5
Republican	June Yang Cutter	64,384	42.5
Total votes		151,382	100.0
General election
Democratic	Brian Maienschein (incumbent)	149,367	55.8
Republican	June Yang Cutter	118,396	44.2
Total votes		267,763	100.0
Democratic hold			

=== District 78 ===
2020 California's 78th State Assembly district election
Primary election
Party	Candidate	Votes	%
Democratic	Chris Ward	69,125	55.6
Democratic	Sarah Davis	34,410	27.7
Democratic	Micah Perlin	20,741	16.7
Total votes		124,276	100.0
General election
Democratic	Chris Ward	123,755	56.2
Democratic	Sarah Davis	95,486	43.8
Total votes		219,241	100.0
Democratic hold			

=== District 79 ===
2020 California's 79th State Assembly district election
Primary election
Party	Candidate	Votes	%
Democratic	Shirley Weber (incumbent)	74,121	65.7
Republican	John Moore	19,619	17.4
Republican	Carmelita "C.L." Larrabaster	19,080	16.9
Total votes		112,820	100.0
General election
Democratic	Shirley Weber (incumbent)	147,994	65.4
Republican	John Moore	78,367	34.6
Total votes		226,361	100.0
Democratic hold			

=== District 80 ===
2020 California's 80th State Assembly district election
Primary election
Party	Candidate	Votes	%
Democratic	Lorena Gonzalez (incumbent)	56,872	72.7
Republican	John J. Vogel	13,999	17.9
Republican	Lincoln Pickard	7,334	9.4
Total votes		78,205	100.0
General election
Democratic	Lorena Gonzalez (incumbent)	121,661	71.5
Republican	John J. Vogel	48,390	28.5
Total votes		170,051	100.0
Democratic hold			
