= Electoral history of Grace Napolitano =

American political record

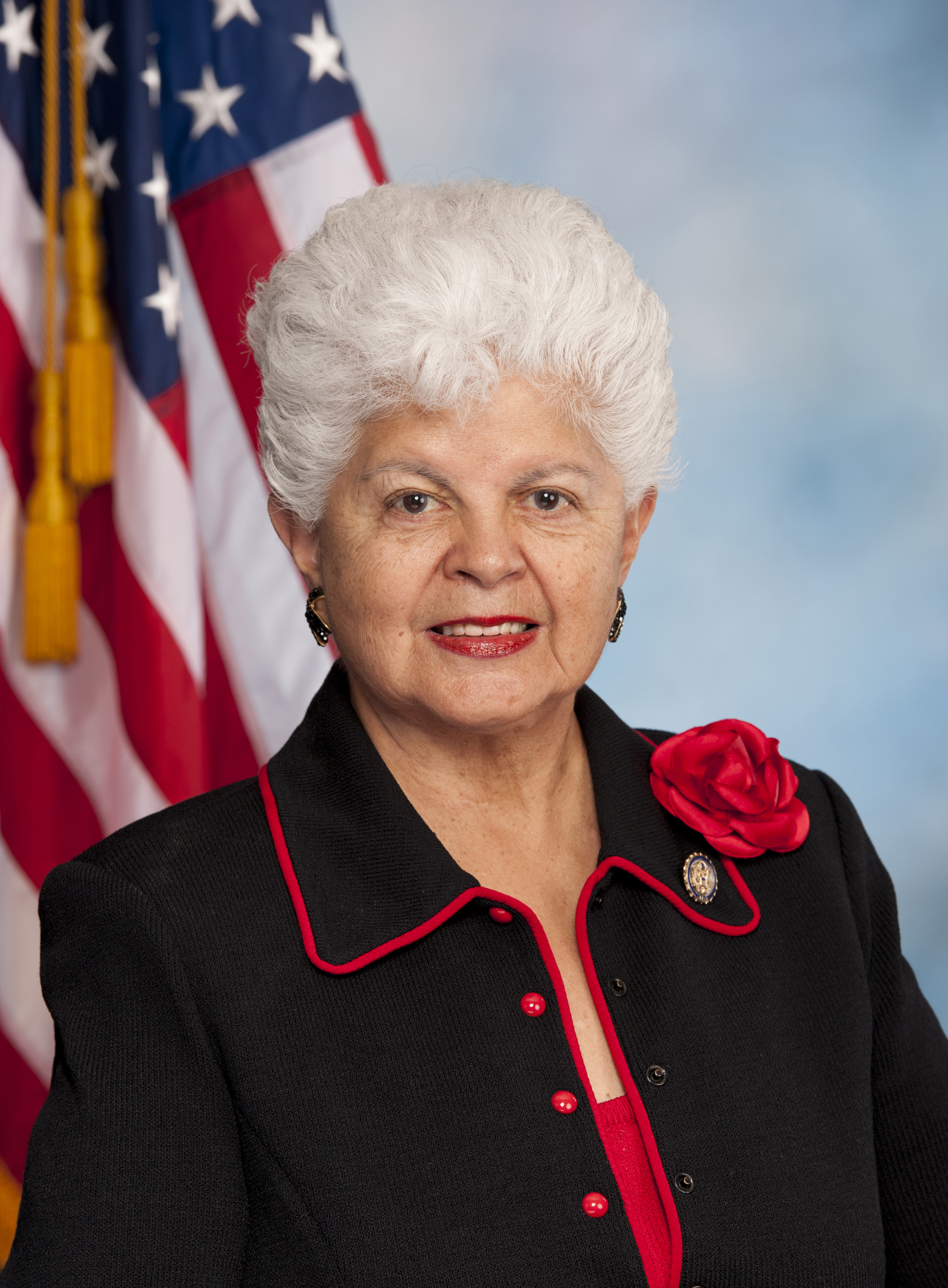
Official portrait, 2011.

Grace Napolitano is an American politician from California who served in the U.S. House of Representatives from 1999 to 2025. She previously served in the California State Assembly and the Norwalk City Council. Napolitano is a member of the Democratic Party, and she primarily served Los Angeles County in both the California State Assembly and the U.S. House of Representatives.

== California State Assembly ==
1992 California State Assembly 58th district election
Primary election
Party	Candidate	Votes	%
Democratic	Grace Napolitano	13,921	42.1
Democratic	Armando Duron	10,487	31.7
Democratic	Rick D. Sanchez	3,462	10.5
Democratic	Raul Pardo	2,829	8.6
Democratic	Albert "Al" Perez, Jr.	2,347	7.1
Total votes		33,046	100.0
General election
Democratic	Grace Napolitano	62,426	64.2
Republican	Ken Gow	27,352	28.1
Libertarian	John P. McCready	7,459	7.7
Total votes		97,237	100.0
Democratic gain from Republican			

1994 California State Assembly 58th district election
Primary election
Party	Candidate	Votes	%
Democratic	Grace Napolitano (incumbent)	19,048	100.0
Total votes		19,048	100.0
General election
Democratic	Grace Napolitano (incumbent)	45,078	59.3
Republican	James "Brett" Marymee	25,547	33.6
Libertarian	John P. McCready	5,394	7.1
Total votes		76,019	100.0
Democratic hold			

1996 California State Assembly 58th district election
Primary election
Party	Candidate	Votes	%
Democratic	Grace Napolitano (incumbent)	22,268	100.0
Total votes		22,268	100.0
General election
Democratic	Grace Napolitano (incumbent)	54,710	61.3
Republican	Albert J. Nunez	27,678	31.0
Libertarian	John P. McCready	6,900	7.7
Total votes		89,288	100.0
Democratic hold			

== U.S. House of Representatives ==
=== 34th district ===
1998 California's 34th congressional district election
Primary election
Party	Candidate	Votes	%
Democratic	Grace Napolitano	30,134	50.5
Democratic	James M. Casso	29,516	49.5
Total votes		59,650	100.0
General election
Democratic	Grace Napolitano	76,471	67.6
Republican	Ed Perez	32,321	28.6
Libertarian	Jason Heath	2,195	1.9
American Independent	Walter Scott	2,088	1.8
Total votes		113,075	100.0
Democratic hold			

2000 California's 34th congressional district election
Primary election
Party	Candidate	Votes	%
Democratic	Grace Napolitano (incumbent)	68,631	100.0
Total votes		68,631	100.0
General election
Democratic	Grace Napolitano (incumbent)	105,980	71.3
Republican	Robert Arthur Canales	33,445	22.5
Natural Law	Julia F. Simon	9,262	6.2
Republican	John W. Brantuk (write-in)	36	0.0
Total votes		148,723	100.0
Democratic hold			

=== 38th district ===
2002 California's 38th congressional district election
Primary election
Party	Candidate	Votes	%
Democratic	Grace Napolitano (incumbent)	21,815	65.0
Democratic	Gregory Salcido	11,755	35.0
Total votes		33,570	100.0
General election
Democratic	Grace Napolitano (incumbent)	62,600	71.1
Republican	Alex A. Burrola	23,126	26.3
Libertarian	Al Cuperus	2,301	2.6
Total votes		88,027	100.0
Democratic gain from Republican			

2004 California's 38th congressional district election
Primary election
Party	Candidate	Votes	%
Democratic	Grace Napolitano (incumbent)	26,632	79.0
Democratic	Michael J. Manzo	7,122	21.0
Total votes		33,754	100.0
General election
Democratic	Grace Napolitano (incumbent)	116,851	100.0
Total votes		116,851	100.0
Democratic hold			

2006 California's 38th congressional district election
Primary election
Party	Candidate	Votes	%
Democratic	Grace Napolitano (incumbent)	31,123	100.0
Total votes		31,123	100.0
General election
Democratic	Grace Napolitano (incumbent)	75,181	75.3
Republican	Sidney Street	24,620	24.7
Total votes		99,801	100.0
Democratic hold			

2008 California's 38th congressional district election
Primary election
Party	Candidate	Votes	%
Democratic	Grace Napolitano (incumbent)	16,140	100.0
Total votes		16,140	100.0
General election
Democratic	Grace Napolitano (incumbent)	130,211	81.7
Libertarian	Christopher Agrella	29,113	18.3
Total votes		159,324	100.0
Democratic hold			

2010 California's 38th congressional district election
Primary election
Party	Candidate	Votes	%
Democratic	Grace Napolitano (incumbent)	22,447	100.0
Total votes		22,447	100.0
General election
Democratic	Grace Napolitano (incumbent)	85,459	73.5
Republican	Robert Vaughn	30,883	26.5
Total votes		116,342	100.0
Democratic hold			

=== 32nd district ===
2012 California's 32nd congressional district election
Primary election
Party	Candidate	Votes	%
Democratic	Grace Napolitano (incumbent)	24,094	46.1
Republican	David Miller	21,843	41.8
Democratic	G. Bill Gonzalez	6,322	12.1
Total votes		52,259	100.0
General election
Democratic	Grace Napolitano (incumbent)	124,903	65.7
Republican	David Miller	65,208	34.3
Total votes		190,111	100.0
Democratic hold			

2014 California's 32nd congressional district election
Primary election
Party	Candidate	Votes	%
Democratic	Grace Napolitano (incumbent)	24,639	60.0
Republican	Arturo Enrique Alas	16,459	40.0
Total votes		41,098	100.0
General election
Democratic	Grace Napolitano (incumbent)	50,353	59.7
Republican	Arturo Enrique Alas	34,053	40.3
Total votes		84,406	100.0
Democratic hold			

2016 California's 32nd congressional district election
Primary election
Party	Candidate	Votes	%
Democratic	Grace Napolitano (incumbent)	54,987	51.4
Democratic	Roger Hernández	26,386	24.7
Republican	Gordon E. Fisher	25,594	23.9
Total votes		106,967	100.0
General election
Democratic	Grace Napolitano (incumbent)	114,926	61.6
Democratic	Roger Hernández	71,720	38.4
Total votes		186,646	100.0
Democratic hold			

2018 California's 32nd congressional district election
Primary election
Party	Candidate	Votes	%
Democratic	Grace Napolitano (incumbent)	56,674	99.9
Republican	Joshua M. Scott (write-in)	42	0.1
Democratic	Ricardo De La Fuente (write-in)	1	0.0
Total votes		56,717	100.0
General election
Democratic	Grace Napolitano (incumbent)	121,759	68.8
Republican	Joshua M. Scott	55,272	31.2
Total votes		177,031	100.0
Democratic hold			

2020 California's 32nd congressional district election
Primary election
Party	Candidate	Votes	%
Democratic	Grace Napolitano (incumbent)	60,011	51.7
Republican	Joshua M. Scott	32,707	28.2
Democratic	Emanuel Gonzales	14,475	12.5
Democratic	Meshal "Kash" Kashifalghita	8,958	7.7
Total votes		116,151	100.0
General election
Democratic	Grace Napolitano (incumbent)	172,942	66.6
Republican	Joshua M. Scott	86,818	33.4
Total votes		259,760	100.0
Democratic hold			

=== 31st district ===
2022 California's 31st congressional district election
Primary election
Party	Candidate	Votes	%
Democratic	Grace Napolitano (incumbent)	49,415	55.5
Republican	Daniel Bocic Martinez	32,721	36.7
Democratic	Rocco Anthony De Luca	6,948	7.8
No party preference	Erskine Levi (write-in)	17	0.0
Total votes		89,101	100.0
General election
Democratic	Grace Napolitano (incumbent)	91,472	59.5
Republican	Daniel Bocic Martinez	62,153	40.5
Total votes		153,625	100.0
Democratic hold			
