= Senator Calderon =

Senator Calderon may refer to:

- Charles Calderon (born 1950), California State Senate
- Ron Calderon (born 1957), California State Senate
- Sila María González Calderón (born 1965), Senate of Puerto Rico
