= Michael Drobot =

American businessman and fraudster

Michael Drobot is a convicted felon who pleaded guilty to orchestrating the largest fraud in California’s history. In 2018, he was sentenced for "overseeing a 15-year-long healthcare fraud scheme" involving over $40 million in illegal kickbacks and $500 million in fraudulent medical bills. The scheme involved bribing physicians to ensure "patients received surgeries at Pacific Hospital, not knowing that [Drobot] bribed their physician to perform their surgery at Pacific Hospital." Between 1978 and 2013, Drobot managed 28 hospitals along the East Coast, including the Mount Sinai Roosevelt in New York (formerly the Roosevelt Medical Center). At the time of his crimes and arrest, he owned Pacific Hospital in Long Beach (now College Medical Center).

== Career ==
=== Early years in hospital administration ===
Drobot spent his early years in Detroit, Michigan, before joining the United States Navy during the Vietnam War. During his time in the Navy, Drobot managed the Naval Hospital in Oakland, California. Upon his discharge from the Navy, Drobot earned an MBA in hospital administration from George Washington University and began a career in hospital management.

=== Healthcare administration in California ===
Drobot's Concept Health Group, Inc. acquired the Healthcare Medical Center of Tustin in July 1990. Drobot had been the executive director of Healthcare Medical Center from 1980 to 1984. Under Drobot, Concept Healthcare expanded the hospital’s services deeper into the Irvine area and added new centers for oncology and sports medicine.

Drobot's longest association was with Pacific Hospital of Long Beach, which he owned and managed from 1997 to 2013, when it was sold to Molina Healthcare and became College Medical Center. During his tenure as CEO, the hospital implemented measures to improve infection control, and was recognized by the Southern California Patient Safety First (SCPSF) initiative for reducing sepsis mortality and hospital-associated infection rates between 2010 and 2012. In 2009, the hospital received a Certificate of Special Congressional Recognition. However, these achievements were later overshadowed by Drobot's criminal activities, which significantly impacted the hospital's reputation.

In 2013, Pacific Hospital of Long Beach was accredited by National Integrated Accreditation of Healthcare Organizations for meeting its standards of patient care and quality management. The same year, the hospital was also designated as ISO 9001:3008 compliant by DNV Healthcare, an accreditor of US hospitals integrating ISO 9001 quality compliance with the Medicare Conditions of Participation.

== Convictions and lawsuits ==
During a criminal investigation in February 2014, Drobot was charged by the FBI in connection with organizing a broad scheme and providing unauthorized payments. As part of the indictment, Drobot was charged with bribing Senator Ron Calderon to preserve California’s “spinal pass-through law.” Senator Calderon was separately indicted by the FBI for accepting bribes and kickbacks from Drobot and others. Drobot signed a plea agreement to cooperate in the government’s ongoing investigation of Senator Calderon and his brother, Tom Calderon, and also into the healthcare fraud scheme known as Operation Spinal Cap.

In October 2014, Drobot and his business partners were sued for using counterfeit screws and hardware in spinal surgeries performed at Pacific Hospital and other area hospitals. At a court hearing on February 20, 2015, Los Angeles Superior Court Judge Elihu M. Berle rejected the claims against the group, as in 29 out of 32 cases, the plaintiffs were not treated at Pacific Hospital. In October 2014, Drobot filed a $50 million defamation suit against attorneys Brian Kabateck and Robert Hutchinson and the law firms of Kabateck Brown Kellner, Cotchett Pitre & McCarthy and Knox Ricksen. In April 2015, Drobot and his company Healthsmart Pacific, Inc. filed a lawsuit against 30 individuals and their attorneys for claiming that Drobot and Healthsmart’s former hospital, Pacific Hospital of Long Beach, harmed them via a counterfeit screw conspiracy. Drobot agreed to cooperate fully with prosecutors in a case that U.S. attorney’s office spokesman Thom Mrozek described as 'active and ongoing."

In 2018, Drobot was sentenced to five years in prison and ordered to pay $10 million to the federal government in forfeiture. Subsequently, federal prosecutors further charged him with wire fraud, among other crimes, to which Drobot pled guilty in 2019. His house and other assets were then seized by the government.

Drobot was released from prison in February 2023. On July 14, 2023, Drobot was sentenced to 33 months in federal prison for accepting more than $315,000 in bribes and kickbacks.
