= Lisa Calderon =

American politician (born 1965)

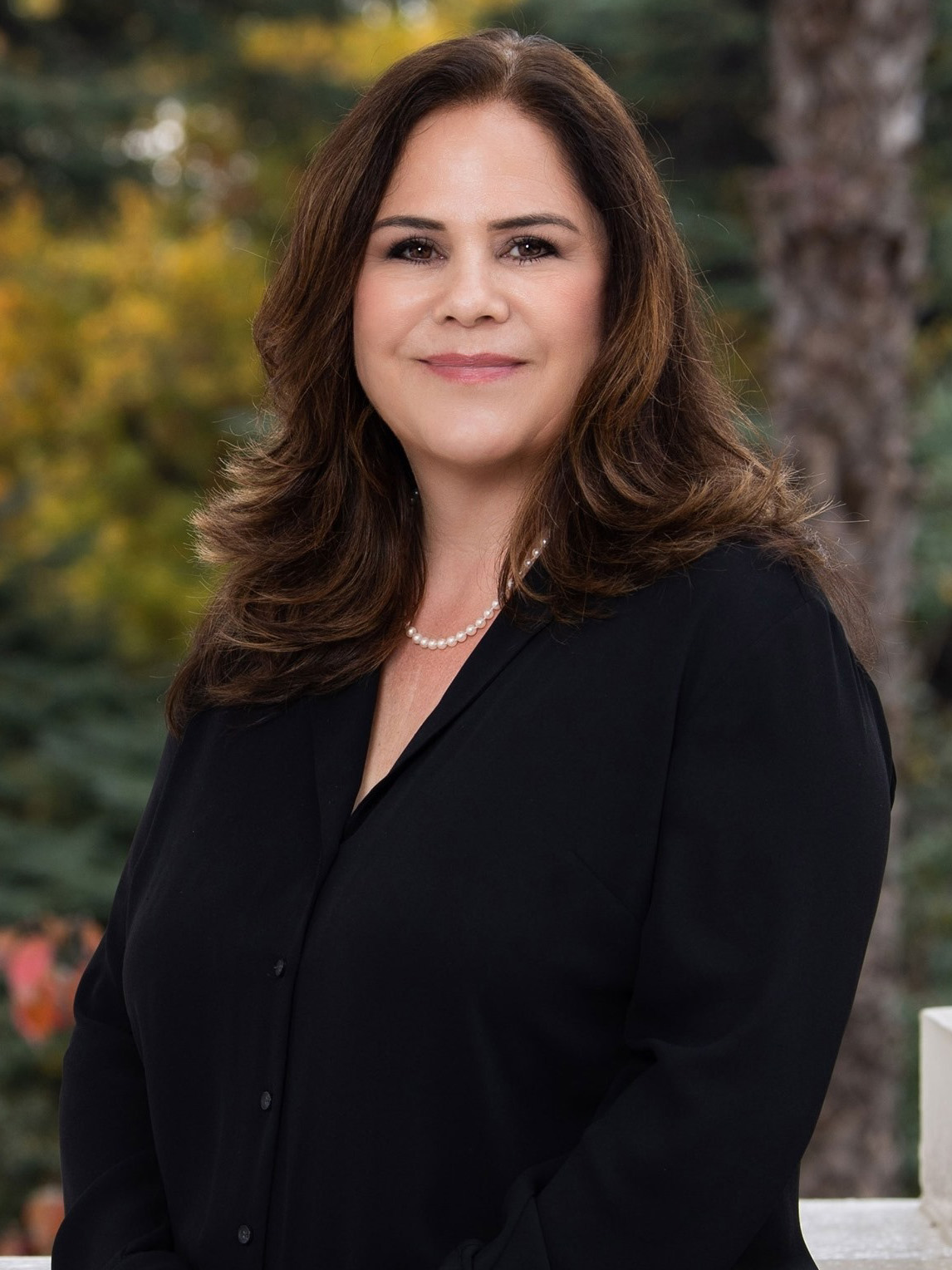
- Official portrait, 2024

Member of the California State Assembly
- Incumbent
- Assumed office December 7, 2020
- Preceded by: Ian Calderon
- Constituency: 57th district (2020–2022); 56th district (2022–present)

Personal details
- Born: Lisa Yvette Rodriguez; January 25, 1965 (age 61)
- Party: Democratic
- Spouse: Charles Calderon
- Relatives: Ian Calderon (stepson); Ron Calderon (brother-in-law); Tom Calderon (brother-in-law)
- Education: Sacramento State University (BS)

Lisa Yvette Calderon (née Rodriguez, born January 25, 1965) is an American politician serving in the California State Assembly. She is a Democrat representing the 56th Assembly District, which encompasses the Gateway Cities and portions of the San Gabriel Valley, including Whittier, South El Monte, and Hacienda Heights. In December 2019, she announced that she would be running in the 2020 election, following the retirement of her stepson, Ian Calderon.

== Personal life ==
She is the second wife of former Assemblymember and State Senator Charles Calderon and stepmother of former Assemblymember and Majority Leader Ian Calderon. She has two other sons, Matthew and Brennan. She worked as a Government Affairs Director for Edison International from 1996 until 2020 and previously was a legislative aide to former California State Assembly Speaker Willie Brown from 1990 until 1996.

== Electoral history ==
2020 California State Assembly 57th district election
Primary election
Party	Candidate	Votes	%
Republican	Jessica Martinez	23,752	28.7
Democratic	Lisa Calderon	16,622	20.1
Democratic	Sylvia Rubio	14,123	17.1
Democratic	Josue Alvarado	11,361	13.7
Democratic	Vanessa C. Tyson	7,121	8.6
Democratic	Primo Castro	3,156	3.8
Democratic	Gary Mendez	2,799	3.4
Democratic	Dora D. Sandoval	2,445	3.0
Democratic	Oscar Valladares	1,297	1.6
Total votes		82,676	100.0
General election
Democratic	Lisa Calderon	114,122	60.5
Republican	Jessica Martinez	74,371	39.5
Total votes		188,493	100.0
Democratic hold			

2022 California State Assembly 56th district election
Primary election
Party	Candidate	Votes	%
Democratic	Lisa Calderon (incumbent)	35,943	59.7
Republican	Jessica Martinez	17,845	29.6
Republican	Natasha Serrano	6,466	10.7
Total votes		60,254	100.0
General election
Democratic	Lisa Calderon (incumbent)	62,079	58.5
Republican	Jessica Martinez	44,105	41.5
Total votes		106,184	100.0
Democratic hold			

2024 California State Assembly 56th district election
Primary election
Party	Candidate	Votes	%
Democratic	Lisa Calderon (incumbent)	38,003	56.4
Republican	Jessica Martinez	21,678	32.1
Republican	Natasha Serrano	7,751	11.5
Total votes		67,432	100.0
General election
Democratic	Lisa Calderon (incumbent)	94,470	56.7
Republican	Jessica Martinez	72,198	43.3
Total votes		166,668	100.0
Democratic hold			
