= Grace Napolitano =

American politician (born 1936)

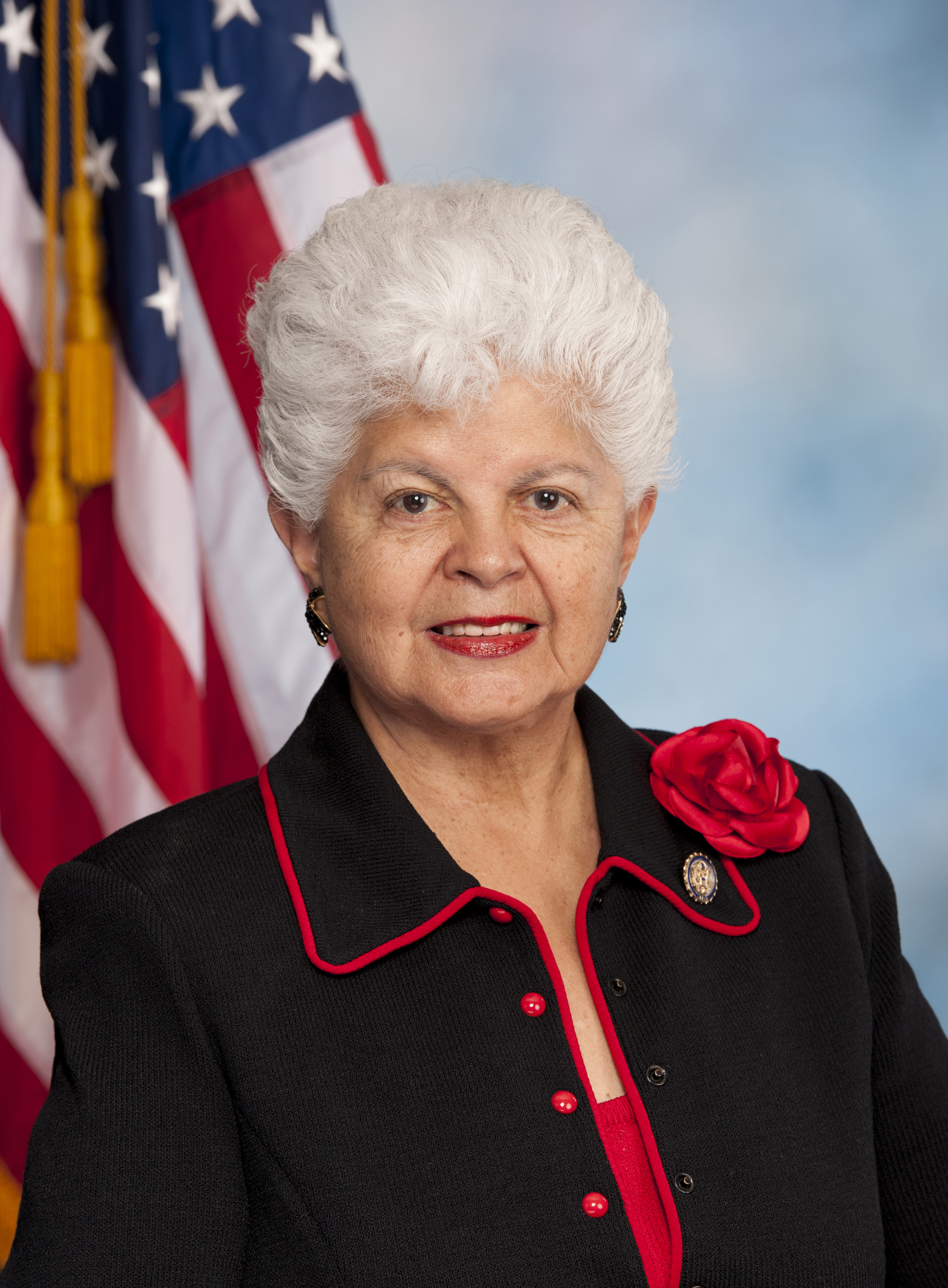
- Official portrait, 2011

Member of the U.S. House of Representatives from California
- In office January 3, 1999 – January 3, 2025
- Preceded by: Esteban Edward Torres
- Succeeded by: Gil Cisneros
- Constituency: 34th district (1999–2003); 38th district (2003–2013); 32nd district (2013–2023); 31st district (2023–2025)

Member of the California State Assembly from the 58th district
- In office December 7, 1992 – November 30, 1998
- Preceded by: Tom Mays
- Succeeded by: Tom Calderon

Personal details
- Born: Graciela Flores; December 4, 1936 (age 89) Brownsville, Texas, U.S.
- Party: Democratic
- Spouses: Fred Musquiz (m. 1954; died 1980); Frank Napolitano (m. 1982; died 2017)
- Children: 5
- Education: Cerritos College (attended); Texas Southmost College (attended)
- Napolitano's voice Napolitano on Hispanic veterans. Recorded May 14, 2007

Graciela "Grace" Napolitano (/nəˌpɒlɪˈtɑːnoʊ/ nə-POL-ih-TAH-noh; née Flores; born December 4, 1936) is an American Democratic Party politician who represented California's San Gabriel Valley and other parts of Los Angeles County in the United States House of Representatives from 1999 to 2025. She previously served in the California State Assembly and the Norwalk City Council. At the age of 88, Napolitano was the oldest sitting member of the House of Representatives at the time of her departure.

Napolitano represented the 34th district from 1999 to 2003, the 38th district from 2003 to 2013, the 32nd district from 2013 to 2023, and 31st district from 2023 to 2025. Due to redistricting, Napolitano ran for and won reelection in the 2012 United States elections in California's 32nd congressional district against Republican nominee David Miller. In the 2014 midterm elections, Napolitano was reelected, defeating Republican nominee Arturo Alas. Napolitano retired from Congress in 2025.

== Early life, education and career ==
Napolitano was born and raised in Brownsville, Texas. After high school, she married Federico "Fred" Musquiz and moved with her husband to Norwalk, California, where they raised five children. After Musquiz's death in 1980, she married Frank Napolitano in 1982.

Napolitano began her political career as a member of the Norwalk City Council, winning her first election in 1986 by 28 votes. Four years later, she was reelected by the largest margin recorded in city history. In 1989, Napolitano's council colleagues elevated her to serve as mayor. During her council tenure, she focused much of her attention on providing access to constituents and on redevelopment and transportation issues to address the city's need for jobs and a more diversified economic base.

Napolitano made her way up through the ranks of Ford Motor Company for 21 years. After her retirement in 1992, she was elected to the California Assembly and became a leader in international trade, environmental protection, transportation and immigration. In 1996 she requested and received the creation of the first new California State Assembly Standing Committee in nine years, the Committee on International Trade, which she chaired until being termed out in 1998. In her six years in the Assembly, she also served as chair of the Women's Caucus and vice chair of the Latino caucus.

Napolitano is a member of the Congressional Progressive Caucus.

== U.S. House of Representatives ==
=== Elections ===
==== 1998 ====
In 1998, Napolitano was termed out of the State Assembly and decided to run for a State Senate seat being vacated by Charles Calderon. She would be facing a difficult race against fellow termed-out Assemblywoman Martha Escutia. Three days before the candidate filing deadline, U.S. Representative Esteban Torres announced his retirement, hoping the late timing of his decision would help his son-in-law, James "Jamie" Casso, win the seat. Napolitano switched races at the last moment and narrowly defeated Casso in the Democratic primary, 51% to 49%.

A 2009 story first reported by Bloomberg News and further detailed by the Los Angeles Times questioned the personal loan interest rate that the Federal Election Commission authorized Napolitano to use during her 1998 campaign for Congress. Both Bloomberg and the Times noted that the FEC had accepted the argument that the 18% rate was equivalent to the early withdrawal penalty that Napolitano was subject to by withdrawing $150,000 from her employee retirement fund and then lending that money to her campaign. Both sources also reported the rate dropping to 10% in 2006, and cited FEC filings as of December 31, 2009, indicating that $221,780 in interest had been paid. The Hill reported that FEC filings for the campaign reporting period ending September 30, 2010, indicated that the debt had been completely retired.

In July 2023, Napolitano announced her intention to retire from Congress and not seek re-election in 2024.

=== Tenure ===
In 2011, Napolitano voted against the National Defense Authorization Act for Fiscal Year 2012 as part of a controversial provision that allows the government and the military to indefinitely detain American citizens and others without trial.

==== Natural Resources Committee ====
Napolitano has been a member of the House Committee on Natural Resources since the 106th Congress and was selected as chair of the Water and Power Subcommittee for the 110th Congress. She has promoted conservation, water recycling, desalination, and sound groundwater management and storage to address Southern California's need for adequate water quality and supply. She is proud of her legislative efforts on a number of fronts—assisting in the implementation of the CALFED Bay-Delta Program, a water management plan for the State of California, protection of the ecosystem in the Bay-Delta and promotion of the use of advanced technologies. She is also a member of the Congressional Wildlife Refuge Caucus.

==== Transportation and Infrastructure Committee ====
At the start of the 110th Congress, Napolitano became the most senior new member of the House Committee on Transportation and Infrastructure, with jurisdiction over America's aviation system, surface transportation, freight and passenger rail, the inland waterway system, international maritime commerce, the Economic Development Administration, the U.S. Army Corps of Engineers' support of the nation's water resources, and the federal clean water program. Napolitano's experience includes six years on the California State Assembly Transportation Committee, and current work on rail safety and congestion relief in the San Gabriel Valley.

Hearings:

- Oversight of U.S. Airline Customer Service: May 2, 2017. Napolitano posed questions to the witnesses, including Oscar Munoz, after committee chair Bill Shuster left his chair. Her questions were critical of the airlines' plans to impose self-regulation in response to recent customer service controversies. As the founder and chair of the Congressional Mental Health Caucus, Napolitano further asked whether the airlines provide mental health services to their employees because of the stressful nature of flight attendant jobs and increasing demands that airlines make of flight attendants. William J. McGee, the country's foremost expert and advocate on consumer rights as the Aviation Consultant for Consumers Union responded that this was "an excellent question because… right now we have a situation where employees are under tremendous strain because of the executive decisions that are putting flight attendants in the front lines of many of these situations. Flight attendants have a primary responsibility to ensure safety, evacuation, and of course customer service, but we have asked them to be bouncers, and police officers, and all kinds of other things, so there is no question that there is an issue of training as well."

==== Congressional Mental Health Caucus ====
Statistics showing one in three Latina adolescents contemplated suicide prompted Napolitano to spearhead a school-based Latina adolescent mental health program in three local middle schools and one high school. She and Tim Murphy co-chair the Congressional Mental Health Caucus. The bipartisan caucus included more than 70 members during the 108th Congress and over 90 members during the 109th Congress. As co-chair, Napolitano has hosted congressional briefings on children's and veteran's mental health needs, working on proposals to improve VA mental health services. A key priority is legislation to provide mental health parity in health insurance.

==== Congressional Hispanic Caucus ====
During the 109th Congress, Napolitano chaired the Congressional Hispanic Caucus, which continues to address national education, immigration, health, and civil rights issues, and the impact these policies have on the Hispanic community.

=== Committee assignments ===
For the 118th Congress:

- Committee on Natural Resources
  - Subcommittee on Energy and Mineral Resources
  - Subcommittee on Water, Wildlife and Fisheries
- Committee on Transportation and Infrastructure
  - Subcommittee on Economic Development, Public Buildings and Emergency Management
  - Subcommittee on Highways and Transit
  - Subcommittee on Railroads, Pipelines, and Hazardous Materials
  - Subcommittee on Water Resources and Environment (Ranking Member)

=== Caucus memberships ===
- Medicare for All Caucus
- Congressional Hispanic Caucus
- Congressional Mental Health Caucus (Co-Chair)
- Congressional Wildlife Refuge Caucus
- Congressional Equality Caucus
- United States Congressional International Conservation Caucus
- House Baltic Caucus
- Congressional Arts Caucus
- Congressional Asian Pacific American Caucus
- Congressional Progressive Caucus
- Congressional Taiwan Caucus

== Political positions ==
Napolitano voted with President Joe Biden's stated position 100% of the time in the 117th Congress, according to a FiveThirtyEight analysis.

=== Abortion ===
Napolitano opposed the overturning of Roe v. Wade, calling it "abhorrent" and a "dreadfully sad and dark day when you wake up with fewer and diminished rights in the United States of America."

== Personal life ==
Napolitano was married to Frank Napolitano, a restaurateur and community activist, from the early 1980s until his death from cancer on December 15, 2017, aged 90. Grace Napolitano had five children from a previous marriage, which ended with her husband's death. In 2013, their daughter Yolanda Maria Louwers died of cancer. Louwers was regularly on the campaign trail with Napolitano throughout her political career.

On February 13, 2016, Napolitano had a minor hemorragic stroke during a campaign event. She returned to work by mid-April.

== See also ==
- List of Hispanic and Latino Americans in the United States Congress
- Women in the United States House of Representatives

U.S. House of Representatives
Preceded by Esteban Torres	Member of the U.S. House of Representatives from California's 34th congressional district 1999–2003	Succeeded by Lucille Roybal-Allard
Preceded by Steve Horn	Member of the U.S. House of Representatives from California's 38th congressional district 2003–2013	Succeeded by Linda Sánchez
Preceded by Ciro Rodriguez	Chair of the Congressional Hispanic Caucus; 2005–2007	Succeeded by Joe Baca
Preceded by Judy Chu	Member of the U.S. House of Representatives from California's 32nd congressional district 2013–2023	Succeeded by Brad Sherman
Preceded by Pete Aguilar	Member of the U.S. House of Representatives from California's 31st congressional district 2023–2025	Succeeded by Gil Cisneros
Honorary titles
Preceded by Eddie Bernice Johnson	Oldest member of the U.S. House of Representatives; 2023–2025	Succeeded by Eleanor Holmes Norton; Delegate
Preceded by Eddie Bernice Johnson	Oldest member of the U.S. House of Representatives; 2023–2025	Succeeded by Hal Rogers; Representative
U.S. order of precedence (ceremonial)
Preceded by Barbara Lee as Former U.S. Representative	Order of precedence of the United States as Former U.S. Representative	Succeeded by Jim Saxton as Former U.S. Representative
