= Lawrence Cobb =

American politician (1894–1945)

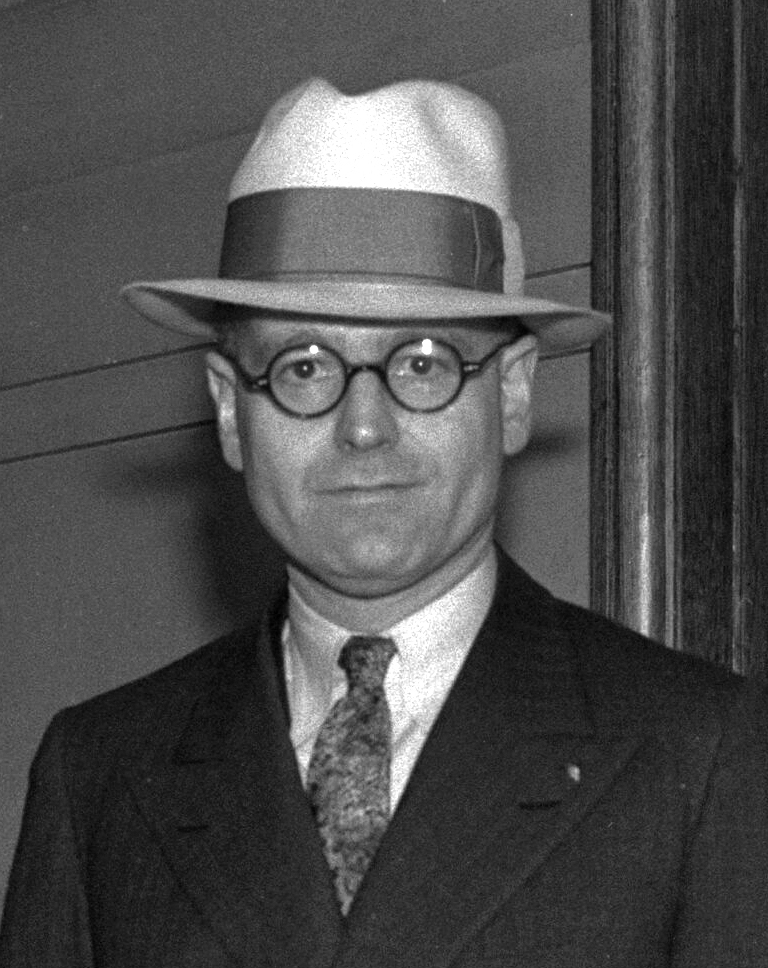
- Cobb in 1935

Member of the California State Assembly from the 58th district
- In office January 5, 1931 – January 7, 1935
- Preceded by: Archibald E. Brock
- Succeeded by: Frank J. Waters Sr.

Personal details
- Born: May 7, 1894 Nebraska, US
- Died: February 11, 1945 (aged 50) California, US
- Party: Republican

Military service
- Branch/service: United States Army
- Battles/wars: World War I

Lawrence Conley Cobb (May 7, 1894 – February 11, 1945) served in the California State Assembly for the 58th district from 1931 to 1935 and during World War I he served in the United States Army.
