= Tom Mays =

American politician

Member of the California State Assembly from the 58th district
- In office December 3, 1990 – November 30, 1992
- Preceded by: Dennis L. Brown
- Succeeded by: Grace Napolitano

Personal details
- Born: February 6, 1954 (age 72) Huntington Park, California, U.S.
- Party: Republican
- Children: 4
- Education: University of California, Los Angeles (BA); University of Chicago (MA)

Tom Mays (born February 6, 1954) is an American politician who served as a member of the California State Assembly for the 58th district from 1990 to 1992. He was previously the mayor of Huntington Beach, California.

== Early life and education ==
Mays was born in Huntington Park, California and raised in Manhattan Beach. He earned a Bachelor of Arts degree in political science from the University of California, Los Angeles and a Master of Arts in social science from the University of Chicago.

== Career ==
Mays began his career as a campaign staffer for Congressman Dan Lungren in 1979. He later served as a district staffer in the office of Assemblyman Nolan Frizzelle. From 1986 to 1990, Mays was a member of the Huntington Beach City Council. During his tenure, Mays also served as mayor. He was elected to the California State Assembly in 1990 and served for one term. He was defeated for re-election by Grace Napolitano. Mays briefly served as director of the California Department of Toxic Substances Control before joining Pacific Life as the company's vice president of government relations. After working for the company from 1993 to 2018, Mays established his own government relations firm.
