= California's 58th State Assembly district =

American legislative district

Current assemblymember
Leticia Castillo; R–Home Gardens
- Population (2020) • Voting age • Citizen voting age: 496,636; 372,127; 310,998
- Demographics: 22.05% White; 5.10% Black; 61.86% Latino; 7.19% Asian; 0.31% Native American; 0.29% Hawaiian/Pacific Islander; 0.55% other; 2.65% remainder of multiracial

California's 58th State Assembly district is one of 80 California State Assembly districts. It is currently represented by Republican Leticia Castillo of Corona.

== District profile ==
The district encompasses portions of northwestern Riverside County and southwestern San Bernardino County.

Riverside County

- Jurupa Valley
- Corona - partial
- Eastvale - partial
- Riverside - partial

San Bernardino County

- Grand Terrace

== Election results from statewide races ==
Year	Office	Results
2024	President	Harris 50.4% – 46.4%
2024	Senator	Schiff 51.7% – 48.3%
2024	Senator (special)	Schiff 51.5 – 48.5%
2022	Governor	Newsom 51.4 – 48.6%
2022	Lieutenant Governor	Jacobs 52.3 – 47.6%
2022	Senator	Meuser 50.7 – 49.2%
2022	Senator (special)	Meuser 50.9 – 49.0%
2021	Recall	Yes 50.1% - 49.8%
2021	Recall	Elder 72.0 - 27.9%
2020	President	Biden 68.1 – 28.3%
2018	Governor	Newsom 71.0 – 29.0%
2018	Lieutenant Governor	Hernandez 51.0 – 48.9%
2018	Senator	Feinstein 51.4 – 48.6%
2016	President	Clinton 72.5 – 22.3%
2016	Senator	Harris 50.4 – 49.6%
2014	Governor	Brown 64.5 – 35.5%
2014	Lieutenant Governor	Nehring 54.7 – 45.2%
2012	President	Obama 70.2 – 27.8%
2012	Senator	Feinstein 71.3 – 28.7%

== List of assembly members representing the district ==
Due to redistricting, the 58th district has been moved around different parts of the state. The current iteration resulted from the 2021 redistricting by the California Citizens Redistricting Commission.

Assembly members	Party	Years served	Counties represented	Notes
Hugh J. Corcoran	Democratic	January 5, 1885 – January 3, 1887	San Joaquin	
Junius Davis Young	Democratic	January 3, 1887 – January 7, 1889	San Joaquin	
Robert S. Johnson	Republican	January 7, 1889 – January 2, 1893	San Joaquin	
B. O. Marston	Democratic	January 2, 1893 – January 7, 1895	Mariposa, Tuolumne	
Charles A. Holland	Democratic	January 7, 1895 – January 4, 1897	Mariposa, Tuolumne	
T. G. McCandish	Democratic	January 4, 1897 – January 2, 1899	Mariposa, Tuolumne	
A. M. McDonald	Republican	January 2, 1899 – January 1, 1901	Mariposa, Tuolumne	
Nathanel Ray	Democratic	January 1, 1901 – January 5, 1903	Mariposa, Tuolumne	
William J. Dougherty	Democratic	January 5, 1903 – January 2, 1905	San Benito	
James Slaven	Republican	January 2, 1905 – January 7, 1907	San Benito	
John O. Davis	Democratic	January 7, 1907 – January 4, 1909	San Benito	
William R. Flint	Republican	January 4, 1909 – January 6, 1913	San Benito	
James E. Cram	Republican	January 6, 1913 – January 4, 1915	San Bernardino	
John Sheldon Phelps	Prohibition	January 4, 1915 – January 8, 1917	San Bernardino	
Samuel Knight Jr.	Republican	January 8, 1917 – January 3, 1921	San Bernardino	
Jeffrey Joseph Prendergast	Republican	January 3, 1921 – January 5, 1925	San Bernardino	
Archibald E. Brock	Republican	January 5, 1925 – January 5, 1931	San Bernardino	
Lawrence Cobb	Republican	January 5, 1931 – January 7, 1935	Los Angeles	
Frank J. Waters Sr.	Republican	January 7, 1935 – February 11, 1938	Los Angeles	Died in office from a heart attack.
Vacant		February 11, 1938 – January 2, 1939	Los Angeles	
Frank J. Waters Jr.	Republican	January 2, 1939 – January 6, 1947	Los Angeles	
Laughlin Edward Waters Sr.	Republican	January 6, 1947 – July 30, 1953	Los Angeles	Resigned to become U.S. Attorney of the Southern California District.
Vacant		July 30, 1953 – December 2, 1953	Los Angeles	
Joseph C. Shell	Republican	December 2, 1953 – January 7, 1963	Los Angeles	Sworn in after winning special election.
Harvey Johnson	Democratic	January 7, 1963 – November 30, 1974	Los Angeles	
Fred W. Chel	Democratic	December 7, 1974 – November 30, 1978	Los Angeles	
Dennis L. Brown	Republican	December 4, 1978 – November 30, 1990	Los Angeles	
Dennis L. Brown	Republican	December 4, 1978 – November 30, 1990	Los Angeles, Orange	
Tom Mays	Republican	December 3, 1990 – November 30, 1992	Los Angeles, Orange	
Grace Napolitano	Democratic	December 7, 1992 – November 30, 1998	Los Angeles	Retired to successfully run for the U.S. House of Representatives in 1998.
Tom Calderon	Democratic	December 7, 1998 – November 30, 2002	Los Angeles	Retired to unsuccessfully run for California Insurance Commissioner in 2002
Ron Calderon	Democratic	December 2, 2002 – November 30, 2006	Los Angeles	Retired to successfully run for State Senate in 2006.
Charles Calderon	Democratic	December 4, 2006 – November 30, 2012	Los Angeles	Term limited
Cristina Garcia	Democratic	December 3, 2012 – November 30, 2022	Los Angeles	Retired to unsuccessfully run for the U.S. House of Representatives in 2022.
Sabrina Cervantes	Democratic	December 5, 2022 – November 30, 2024	Riverside, San Bernardino	Redistricted from the 60th district Retired to successfully run for State Senate in 2024.
Leticia Castillo	Republican	December 2, 2024 – present	Riverside, San Bernardino	

== Election results (1990–present) ==
=== 2024 ===
2024 California State Assembly 58th district election
Primary election
Party	Candidate	Votes	%
Republican	Leticia Castillo	29,500	48.6
Democratic	Clarissa Cervantes	15,713	25.9
Democratic	Ronaldo Fierro	15,514	25.5
Total votes		60,727	100.0
General election
Republican	Leticia Castillo	78,292	50.2
Democratic	Clarissa Cervantes	77,696	49.8
Total votes		155,988	100.0
Republican gain from Democratic			

=== 2022 ===
2022 California State Assembly 58th district election
Primary election
Party	Candidate	Votes	%
Democratic	Sabrina Cervantes (incumbent)	28,568	54.1
Republican	Bernard William Murphy	13,449	25.5
Republican	Leticia Castillo	10,756	20.4
Total votes		52,773	100.0
General election
Democratic	Sabrina Cervantes (incumbent)	50,259	53.6
Republican	Bernard William Murphy	43,464	46.4
Total votes		93,723	100.0
Democratic hold			

=== 2020 ===
2020 California State Assembly 58th district election
Primary election
Party	Candidate	Votes	%
Democratic	Cristina Garcia (incumbent)	55,553	77.3
Green	Margaret Villa	16,295	22.7
Total votes		71,848	100.0
General election
Democratic	Cristina Garcia (incumbent)	122,864	74.9
Green	Margaret Villa	41,100	25.1
Total votes		163,964	100.0
Democratic hold			

=== 2018 ===
2018 California State Assembly 58th district election
Primary election
Party	Candidate	Votes	%
Democratic	Cristina Garcia (incumbent)	14,509	28.9
Republican	Mike Simpfenderfer	13,246	26.4
Democratic	Pedro Aceituno	6,386	12.7
Democratic	Karla V. Salazar	4,603	9.2
Democratic	Friné (Lore) Medrano	4,447	8.9
Democratic	Ivan Altamirano	3,809	7.6
Democratic	John Paul Drayer	1,653	3.3
Democratic	Miguel Angel Alvarado	1,568	3.1
Total votes		50,221	100.0
General election
Democratic	Cristina Garcia (incumbent)	84,003	70.4
Republican	Mike Simpfenderfer	35,301	29.6
Total votes		119,304	100.0
Democratic hold			

=== 2016 ===
2016 California State Assembly 58th district election
Primary election
Party	Candidate	Votes	%
Democratic	Cristina Garcia (incumbent)	56,052	100.0
Republican	Ramiro Alvarado (write-in)	19	0.0
Total votes		56,071	100.0
General election
Democratic	Cristina Garcia (incumbent)	105,170	75.3
Republican	Ramiro Alvarado	34,449	24.7
Total votes		139,619	100.0
Democratic hold			

=== 2014 ===
2014 California State Assembly 58th district election
Primary election
Party	Candidate	Votes	%
Democratic	Cristina Garcia (incumbent)	19,392	100.0
Total votes		19,392	100.0
General election
Democratic	Cristina Garcia (incumbent)	43,182	100.0
Total votes		43,182	100.0
Democratic hold			

=== 2012 ===
2012 California State Assembly 58th district election
Primary election
Party	Candidate	Votes	%
Republican	Patricia A. Kotze-Ramos	9,015	28.1
Democratic	Cristina Garcia	8,517	26.6
Democratic	Tom Calderon	7,290	22.7
Democratic	Luis H. Marquez	3,946	12.3
Democratic	Daniel Crespo	2,096	6.5
Democratic	Sultan "Sam" Ahmad	1,197	3.7
Total votes		32,061	100.0
General election
Democratic	Cristina Garcia	91,019	71.8
Republican	Patricia A. Kotze-Ramos	35,676	28.2
Total votes		126,695	100.0
Democratic hold			

=== 2010 ===
2010 California State Assembly 58th district election
Party	Candidate	Votes	%
Democratic	Charles Calderon (incumbent)	61,375	68.9
Republican	Garrett M. May	27,771	31.1
Total votes		89,146	100.0
Democratic hold			

=== 2008 ===
2008 California State Assembly 58th district election
Party	Candidate	Votes	%
Democratic	Charles Calderon (incumbent)	85,086	70.3
Republican	Carlos Getino	35,867	29.7
Total votes		120,953	100.0
Democratic hold			

=== 2006 ===
2006 California State Assembly 58th district election
Party	Candidate	Votes	%
Democratic	Charles Calderon	53,879	69.4
Republican	Jim Kleinpell	23,766	30.6
Total votes		77,645	100.0
Democratic hold			

=== 2004 ===
2004 California State Assembly 58th district election
Party	Candidate	Votes	%
Democratic	Ronald S. Calderon (incumbent)	71,233	61.9
Republican	Rita Topalian	43,839	38.1
Total votes		115,072	100.0
Democratic hold			

=== 2002 ===
2002 California State Assembly 58th district election
Party	Candidate	Votes	%
Democratic	Ronald S. Calderon	44,997	63.5
Republican	Dave Butler	25,903	36.5
Total votes		70,900	100.0
Democratic hold			

=== 2000 ===
2000 California State Assembly 58th district election
Party	Candidate	Votes	%
Democratic	Thomas M. Calderon (incumbent)	73,028	75.3
Republican	Alex A. Burrola	23,978	24.7
Total votes		97,006	100.0
Democratic hold			

=== 1998 ===
1998 California State Assembly 58th district election
Party	Candidate	Votes	%
Democratic	Thomas M. Calderon	52,311	72.2
Republican	Albert J. Nunez	20,136	27.8
Total votes		72,447	100.0
Democratic hold			

=== 1996 ===
1996 California State Assembly 58th district election
Party	Candidate	Votes	%
Democratic	Grace Napolitano (incumbent)	54,710	61.3
Republican	Albert J. Nunez	27,678	31.0
Libertarian	John P. McCready	6,900	7.7
Total votes		89,288	100.0
Democratic hold			

=== 1994 ===
1994 California State Assembly 58th district election
Party	Candidate	Votes	%
Democratic	Grace Napolitano (incumbent)	45,078	59.3
Republican	James "Brett" Marymee	25,547	33.6
Libertarian	John P. McCready	5,394	7.1
Total votes		76,019	100.0
Democratic hold			

=== 1992 ===
1992 California State Assembly 58th district election
Party	Candidate	Votes	%
Democratic	Grace Napolitano	62,426	64.2
Republican	Ken Gow	27,352	28.1
Libertarian	John P. McCready	7,459	7.7
Total votes		97,237	100.0
Democratic gain from Republican			

=== 1990 ===
1990 California State Assembly 58th district election
Party	Candidate	Votes	%
Republican	Tom Mays	57,311	55.1
Democratic	Luanne W. Pryor	41,905	40.3
Libertarian	Scott Stier	4,754	4.6
Total votes		103,970	100.0
Republican hold			

== See also ==
- California State Assembly
- California State Assembly districts
- Districts in California
