= Tom Calderon =

American politician

Member of the California State Assembly from the 58th district
- In office December 7, 1998 - November 30, 2002
- Preceded by: Grace Napolitano
- Succeeded by: Ron Calderon

Personal details
- Born: April 8, 1954 (age 72) Los Angeles, California, US
- Party: Democratic
- Relations: Charles Calderon (brother); Ron Calderon (brother); Lisa Calderon (sister-in-law); Ian Calderon (nephew)
- Children: 2

Thomas M. Calderon (born April 8, 1954) is an American Democratic politician from the state of California. He served in the California State Assembly from 1998 through 2002. He retired from the State Assembly to run unsuccessfully for California insurance commissioner, a race in which he came in third in the Democratic primary.

In 2014, Calderon and his brother State Senator Ron Calderon were indicted for bribery. In early June 2016, Calderon pleaded guilty to money laundering. In September, he was sentenced to one year and one day, five months of which were to be served at home with electronic monitoring. In a statement, Calderon blamed his poor judgement on his wife's death saying that "had she been alive [he] would have never come anywhere near to taking the actions that [he] did."

Calderon is from Montebello, California.
