= Ian Calderon =

American politician (born 1985)

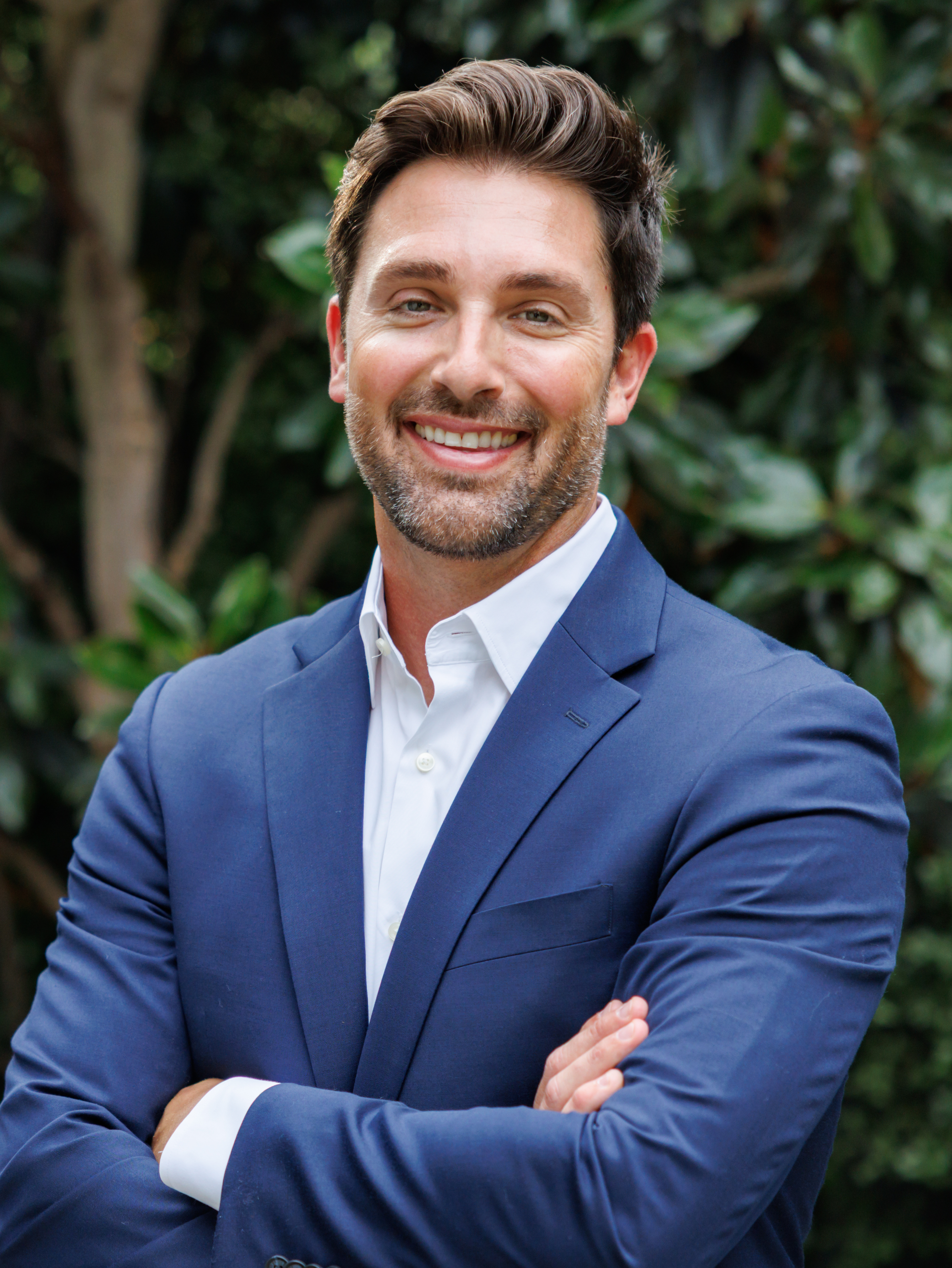
- Calderon in 2025

Majority Leader of the California Assembly
- In office March 10, 2016 – November 30, 2020
- Preceded by: Chris Holden
- Succeeded by: Eloise Reyes

Member of the California State Assembly from the 57th district
- In office December 3, 2012 – November 30, 2020
- Preceded by: Roger Hernández (redistricted)
- Succeeded by: Lisa Calderon

Personal details
- Born: October 19, 1985 (age 40) Whittier, California, U.S.
- Party: Democratic
- Spouse: Elise Lau (m. 2015)
- Children: 4
- Relatives: Charles Calderon (father); Lisa Calderon (stepmother); Tom Calderon (uncle); Ron Calderon (uncle)
- Education: California State University, Long Beach (BA)

Ian Charles Calderon (born October 19, 1985) is an American politician who served in the California State Assembly from 2012 to 2020, representing the 57th district as a member of the Democratic Party. He served as the Assembly majority leader from 2016 to 2020.

Calderon was briefly a candidate in the 2026 California gubernatorial election, withdrawing from the race in March 2026.

== Early life and education ==
Ian Calderon was born on October 19, 1985. He is the son of former assemblymember and state senator Charles Calderon. His stepmother, Lisa Calderon, and uncle, Tom Calderon, were also members of the California State Assembly. His uncle Ron Calderon was a member of the California State Senate.

Calderon earned a Bachelor of Arts from California State University, Long Beach.

== Early career ==
Before holding elective office, Calderon worked as a field representative for state legislators.

== Legislative career ==
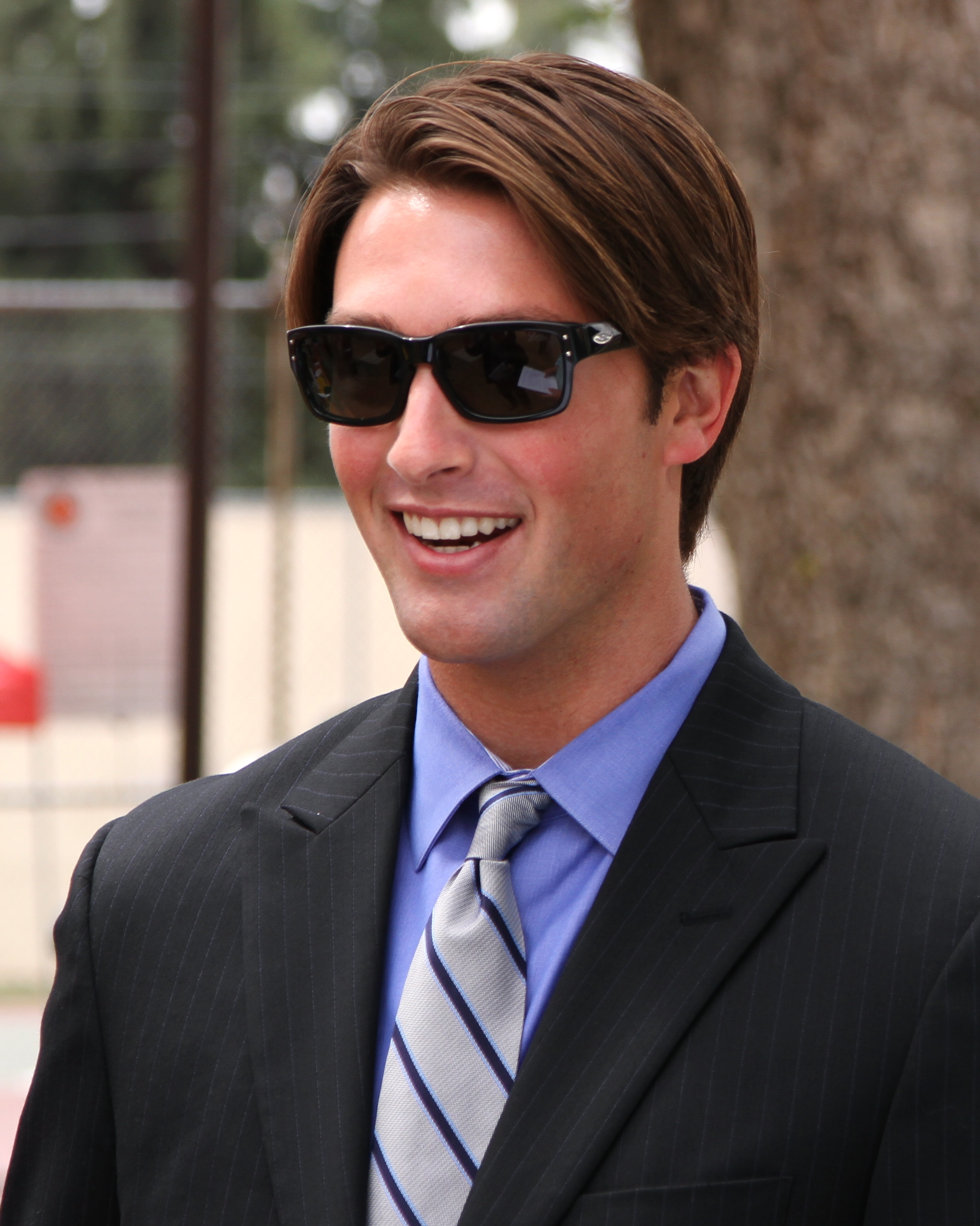
Calderon as a field representative for Roger Hernández in 2011.

In 2012, Calderon was first elected to the California State Assembly representing the 57th District in Los Angeles County, making him the first millennial elected to the California Legislature. He was re-elected in subsequent cycles (2014, 2016, 2018).

In March 2016, Calderon was chosen to become Majority Leader of the Assembly. He remained Majority Leader until the end of his Assembly tenure in 2020.

He introduced AB 2658 in 2018, which created the California Blockchain Working Group to deliberate on blockchain, cryptocurrency, and related technology policy.

Calderon also supported increases in the state minimum wage to $15 per hour by 2022, and efforts to reduce greenhouse gas emissions.

During his Assembly tenure, he served as Chair of the Select Committee on Youth and California's Future, Co-Chair of the Legislative Technology & Innovation Caucus, and Co-Chair of the Legislative Millennial Caucus.

== Post-legislative career and gubernatorial candidacy ==
In November 2019, Calderon announced he would not seek re-election in 2020 in order to focus more on spending time with his family. He served out his term through late 2020.

His stepmother, Lisa Calderon, ran for and won his former Assembly seat in November 2020.

After leaving office, Calderon founded a consulting and lobbying firm called Majority Advisors. The firm's name is a reference to is his tenure as Majority Leader.

In September 2025, Calderon officially announced his candidacy for the 2026 California gubernatorial election. In March 2026, he announced his withdrawal, and endorsed the campaign of Congressman Eric Swalwell.. Then, after Swalwell's exodus from the race, Calderon endorsed Xavier Becerra.

== Personal life ==
Calderon married Elise Calderon in 2015. They have four children. As of 2025, he resides in Orange County, California.

== Electoral history ==
=== 2014 California State Assembly ===
California's 57th State Assembly district election, 2014
Primary election
Party	Candidate	Votes	%
Republican	Rita Topalian	15,859	52.2
Democratic	Ian Calderon (incumbent)	14,544	47.8
Total votes		30,403	100.0
General election
Democratic	Ian Calderon (incumbent)	32,284	51.5
Republican	Rita Topalian	30,397	48.5
Total votes		62,681	100.0

=== 2016 California State Assembly ===
California's 57th State Assembly district election, 2016
Primary election
Party	Candidate	Votes	%
Democratic	Ian Calderon (incumbent)	50,996	65.7
Republican	Rita Topalian	26,639	34.3
Total votes		77,635	100.0
General election
Democratic	Ian Calderon (incumbent)	93,339	62.7
Republican	Rita Topalian	55,577	37.3
Total votes		148,916	100.0
Democratic hold			

=== 2018 California State Assembly ===
California's 57th State Assembly district election, 2018
Primary election
Party	Candidate	Votes	%
Democratic	Ian Calderon (incumbent)	27,136	46.6
Republican	Jessica Martinez	13,824	23.7
Republican	Oscar J. Llamas	9,025	15.5
Democratic	Justin Joshua Valero	6,829	11.7
Democratic	Blake Sullivan Carter	1,393	2.4
Total votes		57,331	100.0
General election
Democratic	Ian Calderon (incumbent)	84,159	64.9
Republican	Jessica Martinez	45,492	35.1
Total votes		129,651	100.0
Democratic hold			

California Assembly
Preceded by Chris Holden	Majority Leader of the California Assembly; 2016–2020	Succeeded by Eloise Reyes
