= Charles Calderon =

American politician (born 1950)

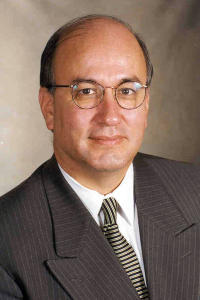

Majority Leader of the California Assembly
- In office March 18, 2010 – September 1, 2012
- Preceded by: Alberto Torrico
- Succeeded by: Toni Atkins

Member of the California State Assembly
- In office December 4, 2006 – November 30, 2012
- Preceded by: Ron Calderon
- Succeeded by: Cristina Garcia
- Constituency: 58th district
- In office December 6, 1982 – April 16, 1990
- Preceded by: Matthew G. Martínez
- Succeeded by: Xavier Becerra
- Constituency: 59th district

Majority Leader of the California Senate
- In office 1996–1998

Member of the California State Senate
- In office April 16, 1990 – December 7, 1998
- Preceded by: Joseph B. Montoya
- Succeeded by: Martha Escutia
- Constituency: 26th district (1990–1994); 30th district (1994–1998)

Personal details
- Born: Charles Michael Calderon; March 12, 1950 (age 76) Montebello, California, U.S.
- Party: Democratic
- Spouse: Lisa Calderon
- Children: 3, including Ian
- Relatives: Ron Calderon (brother); Tom Calderon (brother)
- Education: California State University, Los Angeles (BA); University of California, Davis (JD)
- Occupation: Attorney

Charles Michael Calderon (born March 12, 1950) is an American attorney and politician who served in both chambers of the California State Legislature.

== Early life and education ==
Calderon was born on March 12, 1950, in Montebello, California. He graduated from California State University, Los Angeles and earned a J.D. degree from the UC Davis School of Law.

== Career ==
Prior to his 1982 election to the California State Assembly, Calderon was a prosecutor and also served on the Montebello School Board.

Calderon was first elected to the California State Assembly in 1982. In 1988–89, he became leader of a power struggle for control of the Assembly. The "Gang of Five", included Calderon, Gary Condit, Steve Peace of Chula Vista, Gerald Eaves of Rialto, and Rusty Areias of Los Banos. Self-identified conservative Democrats, the group attempted to wrest power from Willie Brown, then Speaker of the Assembly. Calderon was nominated for the office of Speaker, but Brown prevailed by a vote of 40–34. Brown stripped all five members of committee leadership positions and staff.

In 1990, Calderon left the Assembly, and he was elected to the California State Senate. From September 1996 until the end of his term, Calderon served as the first Hispanic Senate Majority leader in California history. He ran unsuccessfully for Attorney General of California in 1998, losing the primary to Bill Lockyer. Prior to his 2006 election to the Assembly, he served as California Health Care Commissioner and was a partner with the law firm of Nossaman. During his second term in the Assembly he served as Majority Leader between 2010 and 2012.

== Personal life ==
His brothers Ronald S. Calderon and Thomas M. Calderon have both served in the State Assembly. Ronald held Charles's former Senate seat until 2014; Thomas has been out of the legislature since an unsuccessful run for Insurance Commissioner in 2002.

Calderon and his wife, Lisa, have three children. Calderon's son, Ian, served in the State Assembly from 2012 to 2020, representing the 57th district. Lisa won Ian's Assembly seat in 2020.
