= Ron Calderon =

American politician (born 1957)

Ronald Calderon
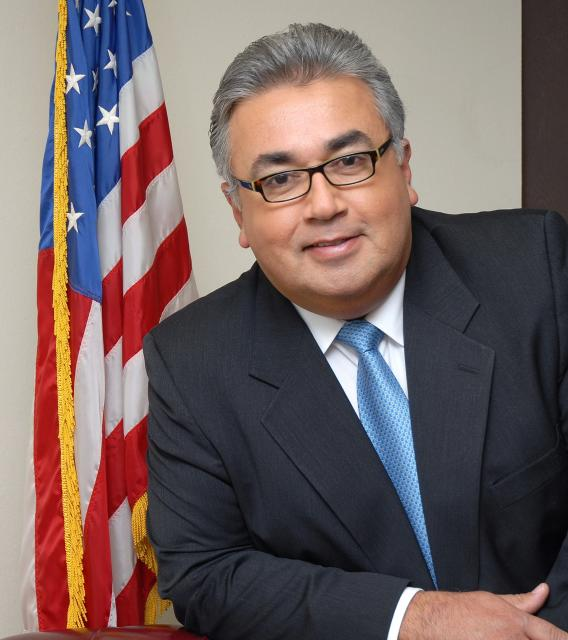

Member of the California State Senate from the 30th district
- In office December 4, 2006 – November 30, 2014
- Preceded by: Martha Escutia
- Succeeded by: Holly Mitchell (redistricted)

Member of the California State Assembly from the 58th district
- In office December 2, 2002 – November 30, 2006
- Preceded by: Thomas M. Calderon
- Succeeded by: Charles M. Calderon

Personal details
- Born: Ronald Steven Calderon; August 12, 1957 (age 69) Montebello, California, U.S.
- Party: Democratic
- Spouse: Ana Calderon
- Relations: Charles Calderon (brother); Tom Calderon (brother); Lisa Calderon (sister-in-law); Ian Calderon (nephew)
- Children: 2
- Education: University of California, Los Angeles (BA)
- Occupation: Owner, financial services sales and marketing firm Mortgage banker Real estate agent

Ronald Steven Calderon (born August 12, 1957, in Montebello, California) is a former Democratic California State Senator from the 30th Senate District. Calderon is also known for receiving bribes from Michael Drobot.

== Early life ==
On August 12, 1957, Calderon was born in Montebello, California. Calderon attended Montebello High School.

== Education ==
In 1980, Calderon earned a Bachelor of Arts degree in Psychology from UCLA. Calderon graduated from the Western State University of Law.

== Career ==
Calderon served as a manager in the manufacturing industry, a mortgage banker, and a real estate agent.

Calderon's political career began when he served as chief of staff for Ed Chavez.

Calderon is the second of his family to serve in the senate and the third to hold a seat in the legislature. Prior to Ronald's election his brothers Charles and Thomas also served in the state assembly.

=== California Assembly ===
After redistricting, Calderon's brother Tom Calderon decided to run for California Insurance Commissioner in 2002. Calderon ran for the seat vacated by his brother Tom and won the Democratic primary with 46% of the vote. He won the general election with 63% of the vote. In 2004, he won re-election with 62% of the vote. In 2006, he retired to run for the California State Senate. His brother, Charles, succeeded him.

Calderon served as Chairman of the Assembly Banking and Finance Committee. He was also elected Assistant Majority Leader.

=== California Senate ===
Calderon was elected to the 30th Senate District, which includes: Bell, Bell Gardens, Commerce, Cudahy, Huntington Park, La Mirada, Los Angeles, Montebello, Norwalk, Pico Rivera, California, Santa Fe Springs, South El Monte, South Gate, Whittier, East Whittier, East Los Angeles, Florence-Graham, Hacienda Heights, South Whittier, and West Whittier-Los Nietos.

In 2006, incumbent Democratic State Senator Martha Escutia decided to retire. In the Democratic primary, Calderon defeated fellow State Representative Rudy Bermúdez 50.4%-49.7%, a difference of just 305 votes. He won the general election with 71% of the vote. In 2010, he won re-election with 69% of the vote. In 2014, Calderon could not run for re-election due to term limits, and he was succeeded by Tony Mendoza.

Calderon was chairman of the Elections, Reapportionment and Constitutional Amendments Committee. Senate President Don Perata selected Calderon to lead senate efforts to reform term-limits and redistricting laws, as well as moving the state's presidential primary from June to February. Calderon also chaired the Select Committee on International Business Trade, in addition to sitting on the Appropriations and Energy, Utilities and Communications committees. Calderon also sat on the California Film Commission, which is tasked with promoting and subsidizing the California film industry.

=== 2012 congressional election ===
In August 2011, Calderon announced he would be running for the United States Congress in the newly redrawn California's 38th congressional district against incumbent U.S. Congresswoman Linda Sánchez in the Democratic primary. Calderon's State Senate district represented around 70% of the redrawn thirty-eighth. Calderon withdrew from the race in January 2012.

== Corruption case ==
On June 4, 2013, the Federal Bureau of Investigation (FBI) raided Calderon's offices in the California State Capitol in an attempt to find evidence regarding accusations of criminal activity.

An FBI affidavit was published online on October 30, 2013, by cable network Al Jazeera America with a claim that State Sen. Ron Calderon accepted about $88,000 in bribes from a Southern California hospital executive, Michael Drobot, for legislation regarding workers' compensation for an expensive surgical procedure, and an undercover FBI agent posing as a film studio owner during a wide-ranging probe into his conduct as a legislator. On November 12, 2013, Calderon was suspended from his committee assignments, citing the ongoing inquiry into the alleged bribe.

On February 21, 2014, Calderon agreed to surrender to federal authorities after being named in a federal grand jury indictment. After surrendering to authorities on February 24, 2014, Calderon appeared in Court and pleaded not guilty to 24 charges relating to wire fraud, bribery, money laundering and falsification of tax returns. His trial was scheduled to commence on April 22, 2014. Calderon was released on a $50,000 surety bond. He could have faced a prison term of up to a maximum 396 years if convicted on all charges. The California Senate gave the senator until March 3, 2014, to either resign or take a leave of absence, failing which a vote would be taken to suspend him from office. On March 2, Calderon announced that he would take a leave of absence. He was absent until the end of the 2014 session, at which point he was term-limited out of office.

On June 13, 2016, federal prosecutors announced that Calderon agreed to plead guilty to mail fraud. A week earlier his brother Tom pleaded guilty to money-laundering.

In October 2016, Calderon was sentenced by U.S. District Judge Christina A. Snyder to serve 42 months in federal prison and perform 150 hours of community service. Calderon began his prison sentence at the Federal Correctional Institution, Sheridan in January 2017, and released in January 2019, after serving only 24 months of his 42-month sentence. Through his attorney, Mark Geragos, he had petitioned the Bureau of Prisons to be released 12 month earlier, in January 2018, under the Second Chance Act of 2007.

== Personal life ==
In 1982, Calderon married Ana. They have two children, Jessica and Zachary. Calderon resides in Montebello, California.

== See also ==
- List of 2010s American state and local politicians convicted of crimes#California

California Assembly
Preceded by Thomas M. Calderon	California State Assemblyman, 58th District; 2002–2006	Succeeded by Charles M. Calderon
California Senate
Preceded by Martha Escutia	California State Senator, 30th District; 2006–2014	Succeeded by Tony Mendoza
