= Gressitt =

Gressitt may refer to:

- Felicia Gressitt Bock (1916–2011), American translator and scholar
- Judson Linsley Gressitt (1914–1982), American entomologist and naturalist
- Gressitt, Virginia, an unincorporated community in King and Queen County, Virginia, United States
