= 1998–99 California special elections =

U.S. state elections

From April 1998 to March 1999, five special elections were held in the Oakland and Berkeley area. The process was triggered by the mid-term retirement of U.S. Representative Ron Dellums and ended one year later with the unexpected election to the California State Assembly of Green Party candidate Audie Bock, by which time turnout had fallen to just 15% of registered voters.

The five special elections were:

- April 7, 1998: Barbara Lee replaced Ron Dellums in the United States House of Representatives
- September 1, 1998: Special election to replace Barbara Lee in the California State Senate
  - November 3, 1998: Don Perata wins the run-off to replace Barbara Lee in the California State Senate
- February 2, 1999: Special election to replace Don Perata in the California State Assembly
  - March 30, 1999: Audie Bock wins the run-off to replace Don Perata in the California State Assembly

The cycle is the most famous example of what has been referred to as special election musical chairs, a series of special elections in which each but the last election winner is an elected official who must then vacate their seat, triggering another special election.

== Congressional special election ==
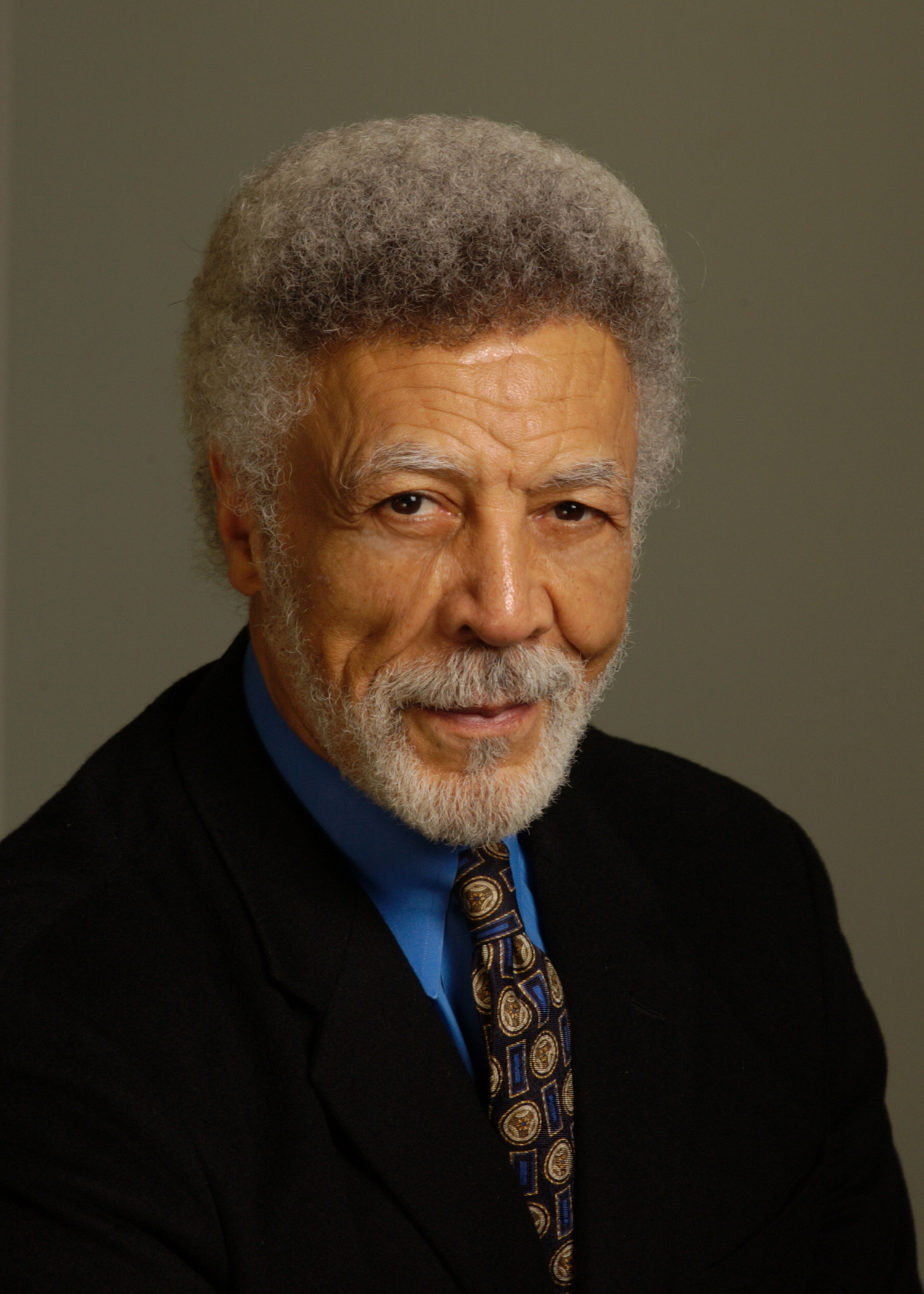
Ron Dellums

On November 17, 1997, U.S. Representative Ron Dellums announced that he was retiring from Congress. Having represented the Oakland-Berkeley area since 1970 and first elected as anti-Vietnam War activist, the 61-year-old Dellums said: "Now I choose to make a personal decision and to empower myself to regain my life. It is important for me to now move on." However, rather than serve the rest of his 2-year term (which was set to expire in January 1999), Dellums announced that he would step down effective February 1998. Therefore, a special election would have to be called, and was scheduled for April 7, 1998.

Upon stepping down, Dellums endorsed a long-time aide, Barbara Lee, who at the time was representing the Berkeley and Oakland area in the California State Senate. With strong support from a popular incumbent, Lee faced little opposition in the April 7th special election. She was elected to Congress with 67% of the vote, defeating fellow Democrats Greg Harper and Randall Stewart, as well as Republican Charlie Sanders. Voter turnout was 16%. Lee resigned from the State Senate immediately to take her seat in Congress. This triggered a special election for Lee's California State Senate seat, called for September 1, 1998.

== California State Senate election special election ==
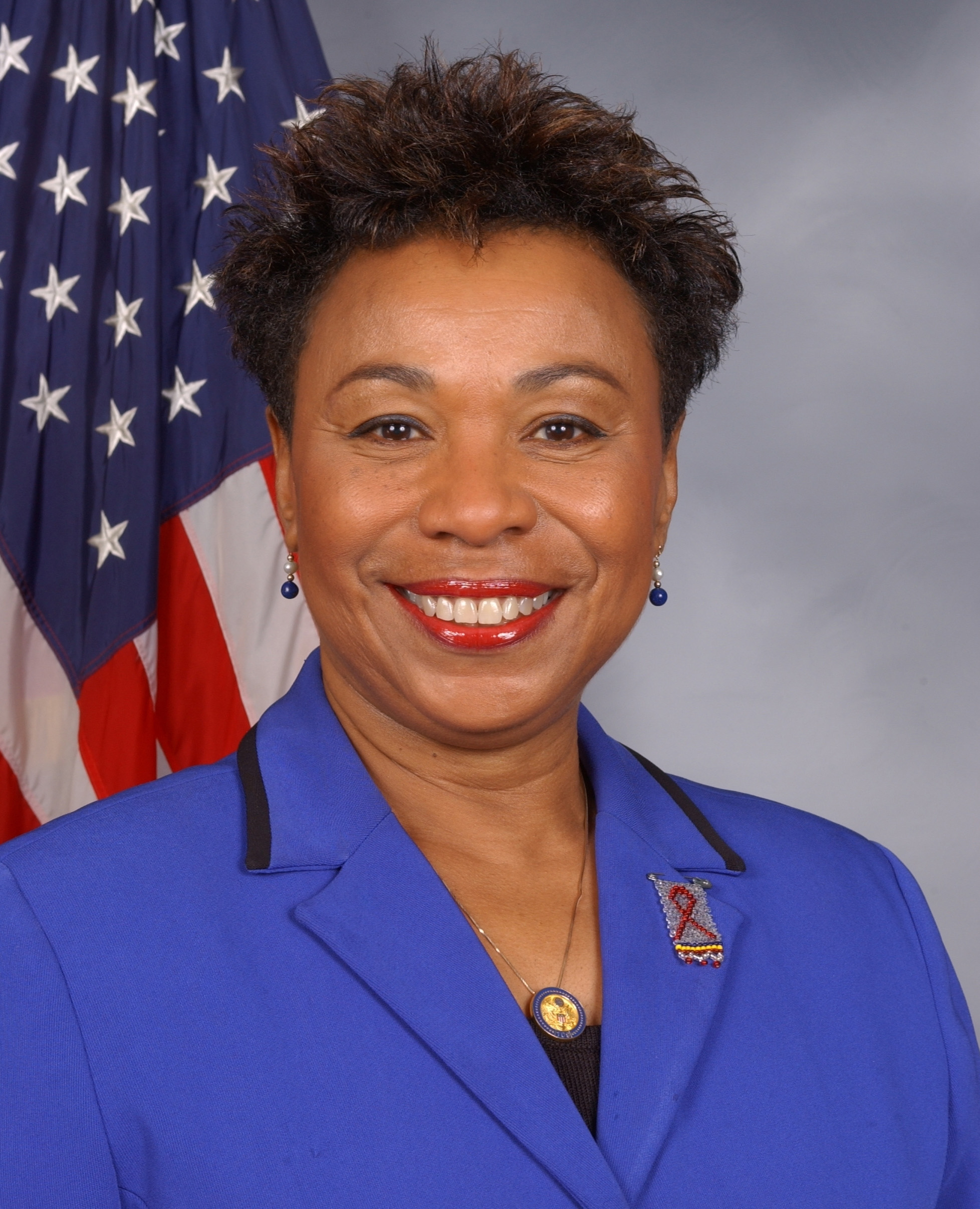
Barbara Lee

Unlike the congressional race, where Lee had no significant opposition, the special election for Lee's state senate seat was fiercely contested by local Democrats. Because the California legislature has term limits, there were many politicians seeking higher office—and many viewed the special election as a rare opportunity to run for a Senate seat without risking their existing office.

At first, two Democrats entered the race: California State Assemblywoman Dion Aroner of Berkeley, and Alameda County Supervisor Keith Carson, also of Berkeley. Both were considered progressive Democrats in the Dellums-Lee mold, and shared a similar political base. Like Lee, Carson was on Dellums' staff for 20 years.

California State Assemblyman Don Perata of Alameda "told Carson that he had no plans to run himself, but then after Carson jumped into the race, Perata did, too." Aroner and Carson split the progressive vote, thereby helping Perata win the race.

The September special election had a 15% voter turnout. Fueled by a well-financed, absentee ballot-driven campaign, Don Perata finished in first place with 33% of the vote. Dion Aroner came in a very close second with 32% -- only 900 votes short of a first-place finish. Carson finished third with 20% -- and other candidates finished far behind.

With no candidate receiving a majority, a run-off election was required. But it was not to be a run-off between the top two finishers (Perata and Aroner) because both were Democrats. Under California election law at that time, if no candidate receives a majority in a special election for a partisan office, there must be a run-off among the top finishers of each political party, not the top two vote-getters overall. Therefore, Aroner and Carson were eliminated from the run-off because, like Perata, they were Democrats.

=== Runoff coinciding with the statewide gubernatorial election ===
The run-off was between Perata as the Democratic candidate, Deborah Wright as the Republican candidate and Marsha Feinland as the Peace & Freedom Party candidate. Because the district is overwhelmingly Democratic, running against these two candidates did not generate much excitement. With the November 1998 general election just two months away, the special run-off election was consolidated with the previously scheduled statewide election.

On November 3, 1998, when Gray Davis was elected Governor of California and U.S. Senator Barbara Boxer was reelected to a second term, Don Perata easily won the special election to the State Senate over the Republican and Peace & Freedom party candidates.

But while running for the State Senate, Perata was also on the ballot for re-election to the California State Assembly—and in that race he easily defeated Republican Linda Marshall. Since he could not legally hold a seat in both houses of the legislature, Perata announced on November 4 that he would resign his Assembly seat as soon as possible.

Therefore, a special election was called for Perata's Assembly seat on February 2, 1999.

== California State Assembly special election ==
Perata represented the 16th Assembly district, which covered most of Oakland, Piedmont, and Alameda. Oakland Mayor Elihu Harris (who had represented the district from 1977-1991 in the state Assembly) entered the race, and was heavily supported by the California Democratic Party establishment. However, Oakland lawyer Frank Russo, a Democrat, also entered the race and received significant support from Democrats who were disenchanted with Harris. Audie Bock, a Green Party candidate, also entered the race.

On February 2, with a 19.5 percent voter turnout, Harris finished first with 49% of the vote. Frank Russo came in second place with 37% and Audie Bock received 8.7% of the vote. Harris came up just a few thousand votes short of an outright majority. As in the State Senate election, California law required a run-off election between the top finishers of each political party. A special run-off election was called for Tuesday, March 30, 1999 between Harris as the Democratic Party candidate, and Audie Bock as the Green Party candidate. Since Russo was a Democrat like Harris, he was eliminated.

=== Run-off ===
Harris was initially an overwhelming favorite to win. Not only was he the former mayor of Oakland and the district's former assemblyman, but he had almost won the February election outright. Additionally, Audie Bock had received only 8.7% of the vote in the February election. Harris was so sure he would win that he spent Election Day in Sacramento negotiating his committee assignments.

But the California Democratic Party made a mistake that arguably created one of the biggest upsets in local political history. In an effort to boost voter turnout in black-majority, heavily Democratic precincts in Oakland, the party sent voters "chicken-dinner" vouchers that said that if they could bring their voter stub to certain locations proving that they had voted, they would receive a free chicken dinner. This created an outcry among voters who felt that it amounted to illegal vote-buying, and also deemed the offer racist and demeaning.

The voucher incident severely crippled Harris's campaign. On March 30, in a special run-off election with 15% turnout, Harris lost by less than 1,000 votes to Bock.

It was one of the largest political upsets in California history—as Bock became the first Green Party candidate in the country to be elected to a state legislative body. Bock's victory was heralded by progressives across the country, but was minimized by the fact that she had been elected in a very low turnout special election—after a series of five special elections in less than twelve months.

Bock's victory ended the year-long Special Election musical chairs. In the following seven years, the East Bay did not have a special election for statewide or congressional office.

== Retrospective analysis ==
Holding five special elections in less than twelve months cost the state an enormous amount of money. With repeated special elections, voter turnout declined, placing fateful decisions of who would dominate East Bay politics in the hands of a small minority of the area's population who are generally more informed and more politically active.

=== Inevitability ===
Some argue that Ron Dellums should not have resigned in the middle of his term and that his decision to retire prematurely caused the chain reaction of special elections. However, his mid-term resignation was not the only cause of the chain reaction. Had Dellums simply retired at the end of his term in November 1998 and endorsed Barbara Lee as his successor, the April 1998 congressional election and the September 1998 state Senate election would have been avoided, but, assuming Lee would still have run for and won the House seat, she would have then been forced to resign her state Senate seat, creating the need for a special election in February 1999, and possibly follow-on elections as well.

=== Election law for special elections ===
Another issue that played out in these elections is whether California election law should be amended to deal with how and when run-off special elections should be held. Section 10706(a) of the California Election Code, which governs special elections, said at the time:

If no candidate receives a majority of votes cast, the name of that candidate of each qualified political party who receives the most votes cast for all candidates of that party shall be placed on the special general election ballot as the candidate of that party.

This law was passed in 1963 by Democrats in the California state legislature to deal with a problem that had plagued the party for years. The previous law did not require a run-off at all, and whichever candidate in a special election received a simple plurality of the vote won. Because Republicans tended to be more unified than Democrats, this law benefited Republicans—who would often run only one candidate who would win in a crowded field of candidates, even in strong Democratic districts. The idea behind changing the law was to require a run-off so that, under such a scenario, the top Republican who came in first would then have to face the top Democrat.

However, in districts as overwhelmingly partisan as the districts of the East Bay, this meant that the candidate of the minority party had typically come in third or fourth in the special primary election, increasing the importance of the primary, and leading to possible upsets, such as Harris unexpectedly losing to Green Party candidate Audie Bock, who had received less than 9% of the vote in the previous special election.

Some people argued that this scenario as played out in these elections did not give voters a fair choice because a run-off should be held between the top two finishers, not the top finisher of each party. While Aroner, theoretically, could have challenged Perata two years later in the regularly scheduled election, political reality dictates that it is virtually impossible to defeat an incumbent legislator in a safe district.

In California Democratic Party v. Jones, the Supreme Court of the United States struck down the blanket primary. California's partisan primary system was changed in 2010 by Proposition 14 and replaced with a jungle primary in which the top two finishers advance to a runoff without regard for partisan affiliation. The new jungle primary was first used in 2012.
