= California's 16th district =

California's 16th district may refer to:

- California's 16th congressional district
- California's 16th State Assembly district
- California's 16th State Senate district
