= Audie Bock =

American film scholar and politician

Audie Elizabeth Bock

Member of the California State Assembly from the 16th district
- In office April 5, 1999 – November 30, 2000
- Preceded by: Don Perata
- Succeeded by: Wilma Chan

Member of the Sarasota Soil and Water Conservation District Board
- Incumbent
- Assumed office 2018

Personal details
- Born: October 15, 1946 (age 80) Berkeley, California, U.S.
- Party: Republican (before 1994, 2016–present)
- Other political affiliations: No Party Preference (2000; 2014–2016); Democratic (2001–2013); Green (1994–1999)
- Occupation: Film scholar

Audie Elizabeth Bock (born October 15, 1946) is an American film scholar and politician who served in the California State Assembly from 1999 to 2000, and was elected to the Sarasota County, Florida Soil and Water Conservation District in 2018.

She was elected in 1999 as a Green Party member during a special election for Oakland's 16th Assembly District, but switched to the Democratic Party after losing the 2000 election.

== Early life and career ==
Bock was born in New York and raised in Berkeley, California, the daughter of Charles K. Bock and Felicia Gressitt Bock. She attended Berkeley High School. She then attended Wellesley College, graduating in 1967.

For the next five years, she lived in Japan, near Tokyo, where she taught English and helped to publish English-language travel books.

After that, she returned to the United States to attend Harvard University, where she received a master's degree in East Asian studies. She stayed at Harvard to receive a PhD, where she wrote a dissertation on Japanese film directors. This involved returning to Japan and interviewing some directors, including Akira Kurosawa; the two struck up a friendship as a result.

Bock's dissertation was published as the 1978 book Japanese Film Directors (ISBN 0-87011-304-6).

Bock served as an assistant producer on Kurosawa's 1980 film Kagemusha.

== Academic career ==
Bock translated Akira Kurosawa's partial autobiography, Something Like An Autobiography (ISBN 0-394-71439-3), which was published in 1983 by Vintage International. In 1985 she wrote the first book-length study in English of Mikio Naruse, Naruse: A Master of the Japanese Cinema.

Bock has taught college classes, as well as teaching throughout Hayward as a K-12 and adult school substitute teacher.

She holds a Certificate in Non-Profit Management from the University of San Francisco.

In 1994, Bock joined the Green Party. She served as a volunteer on Ralph Nader's 1996 campaign for the presidency.

== California State Assembly ==
Bock was elected to the Assembly in a 1999 special election after the mid-term resignation of U.S. Congressman Ron Dellums. Dellums' resignation caused a number of special elections that resulted in the ascension of State Senator Barbara Lee to Dellums' congressional seat (she had been Dellums' former chief of staff), and the rise of State Assemblyman Don Perata to Lee's Senate seat. The special election was the last in a series of five special elections in twelve months known as the special election musical chairs.

Although she received less than 9 percent of the vote in the February 2 special election for Perata's assembly seat, no candidate received 50 percent of the vote, causing a runoff election. Poor campaigning and a scandal involving her Democratic opponent worked in her favor; her opponent, former Assemblyman and former Oakland mayor Elihu Harris, had received nearly 49% of the vote in the first election. Harris sent targeted mailers to households in selected precincts, mostly African American, urging voters to vote for him and receive a fried chicken meal if they presented a voting stub at selected supermarkets. There was voter backlash because of the perception of vote buying (Section 18521 of the California Elections Code prohibits offering money or "other valuable consideration" in return for voting; the Harris campaign argued the fried chicken coupons were not covered) and that the tactic had a subtext of racism. Working with Bock, in the capacity of Campaign Coordinator, John Maurice Cromwell helped build a coalition of Green Party members, disaffected Democrats and Republicans (who had no candidate in the race) to defeat Harris. Bock was outspent by Harris by a margin of better than 16 to 1 ($550,000 to $33,000).

While an assemblywoman, she helped secure funding for numerous park projects, including restoration of the shores of Oakland's Lake Merritt.

On October 7, 1999, Bock left the Green Party and re-registered as "Decline to State" so that she would not have to run in the March 2000 blanket primary and thus not have to compete directly against her Democratic opponent Alameda County Supervisor Wilma Chan until the November 2000 General Election, by when she presumably would have had more time to fundraise. During this same period, however, her acceptance of $500 campaign contributions from Chevron and Tosco drew criticism from within the Green Party. Running as an independent, Bock lost the November 2000 election and afterwards re-registered as a Democrat.

== Additional runs for office ==
Bock announced her run against Barbara Lee in the 2002 primary as a Democrat, arguing that Lee's vote against the war in Afghanistan was unpatriotic. She later withdrew from the race before the filing deadline.

In 2003, Bock ran for Governor of California in the 2003 California gubernatorial recall election. She received 3,358 votes, placing 22nd in a field of 135 candidates.

In 2008, Bock ran for a two-year term on the board of the Hayward Area Recreation & Park District. Bock received 22,845 votes (46%), finishing second behind interim incumbent Paul Hodges.

In 2012, Bock ran successfully for a four-year term on the Board of the Fairview Fire Protection District.

In 2014, Bock ran for the California Senate in the 10th State Senate District, running as having No Party Preference. She came in 5th place, with 4% of the vote.

Subsequently, she relocated to Florida and ran for the Sarasota Soil and Water Conservation District in 2018, winning office unopposed.

California Assembly
Preceded by Don Perata	California State Assemblymember; 16th district 1999-2000	Succeeded by Wilma Chan
