= Wilma Chan =

American politician (1949–2021)

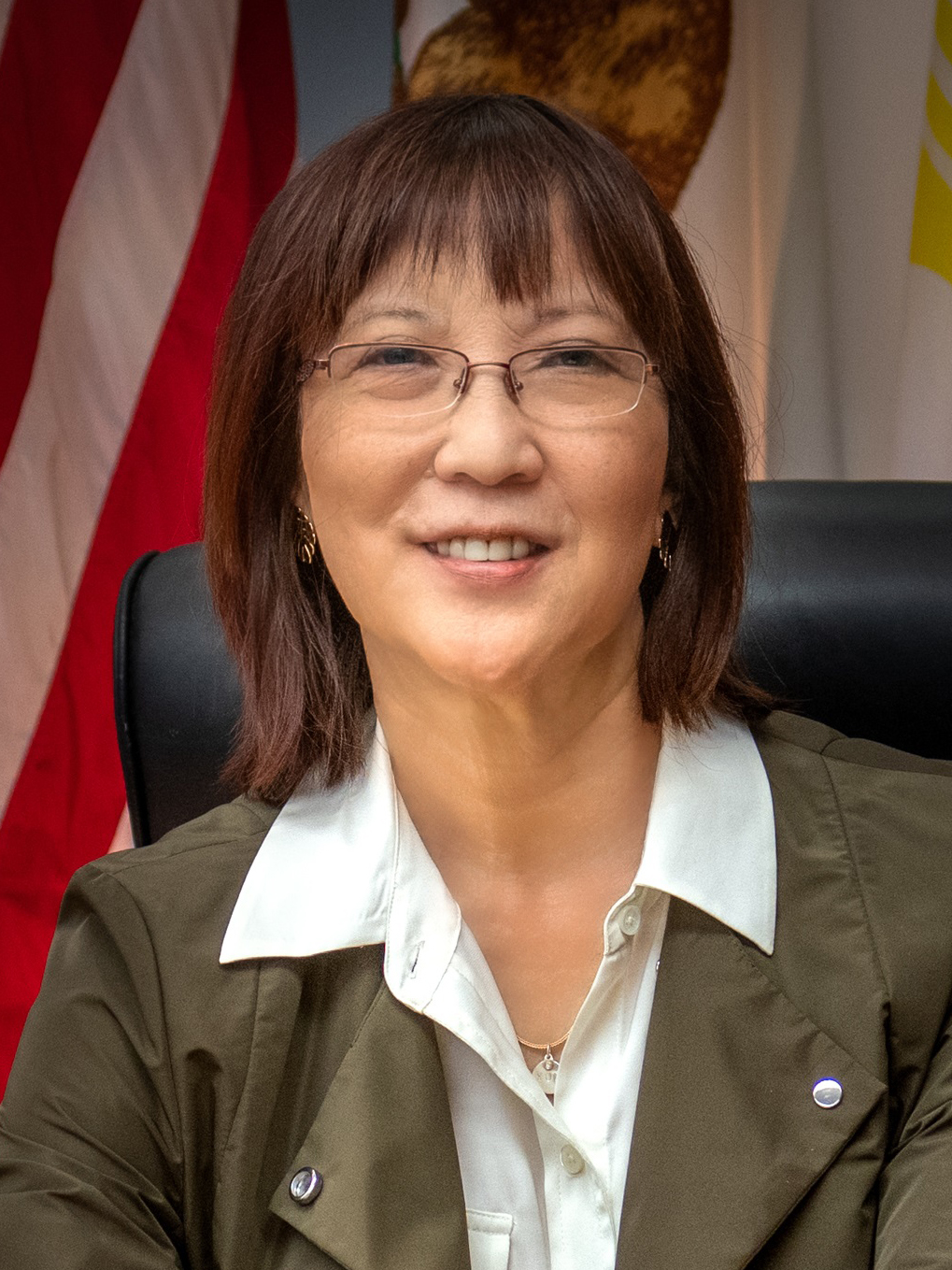
- Official portrait, 2021

Member of the Alameda County Board of Supervisors from the 3rd district
- In office January 3, 2011 – November 3, 2021
- Preceded by: Alice Lai-Bitker
- Succeeded by: Dave Brown
- In office January 2, 1995 – December 4, 2000
- Preceded by: Don Perata
- Succeeded by: Alice Lai-Bitker

Majority Leader of the California Assembly
- In office February 7, 2002 – November 30, 2004
- Preceded by: Kevin Shelley
- Succeeded by: Dario Frommer

Member of the California State Assembly from the 16th district
- In office December 4, 2000 – November 30, 2006
- Preceded by: Audie Bock
- Succeeded by: Sandré Swanson

Personal details
- Born: October 5, 1949 Boston, Massachusetts
- Died: November 3, 2021 (aged 72) Oakland, California
- Party: Democratic Party
- Education: Wellesley College; Stanford Graduate School of Education
- Occupation: Politician

Wilma Chan (Chinese: 陳煥瑛; pinyin: Chén Huànyīng; October 5, 1949 – November 3, 2021) was an American politician in California serving on the Alameda County Board of Supervisors. A Democrat, she served in the California State Assembly from 2000 to 2006 before being termed out, representing the 16th District, which at the time included Oakland, Alameda, and Piedmont. She served as Assembly Majority Whip from 2001 to 2002 and from 2002 to 2004 as Assembly Majority Leader, the first woman and the first Asian American to hold the position. In 2008, Chan lost a Democratic Party primary election for the California State Senate District 9 seat.

On November 3, 2021, while walking her dog, Chan was struck and killed by a vehicle in the City of Alameda, California.

== Early life and education ==
Chan was born in Boston, Massachusetts to Chinese immigrant parents. She held a BA from Wellesley and a master's degree in Education Policy from the Stanford Graduate School of Education.

== Career ==
=== Early political activism ===
From the late 1960s into the 1980s Chan was active in Bay Area political movements, as a member of the League of Revolutionary Struggle (M-L). For a time, she served as the Chairperson of the National Asian Struggles Commission within the LRS.

=== Alameda County Board of Supervisors ===
Chan won election to the Alameda County Board of Supervisors in 1994, the first Asian American to do so, and was reelected unopposed in 1998. In 2000, while serving as President of the board, she was elected to the California State Assembly and resigned her seat on the board.

During Chan's term, she chaired the county's committee on health. She was the first chair of the Alameda County Children and Families Commission that annually distributed $20 million for children's services. As a member of the Board of Supervisors, she worked to expand the number of school-based health clinics and worked to restore benefits to legal immigrants. She initiated a pilot welfare-to-work project in Oakland's San Antonio neighborhood, and developed the strategic plan on the future of health care services in Alameda County.

=== Run for the Assembly ===
Chan declared her candidacy for California Assembly District 16 by mid-June 1999. In her campaign she highlighted the need for more Asian American representation in the Assembly. Former Oakland mayor Elihu Harris briefly entered the Democratic primary but dropped out, leaving Chan unopposed. She won the primary with over 80% of all votes cast and in the general election defeated the incumbent, Audie Bock, with over two-thirds of all votes cast.

=== State Assembly ===
Beyond her role as majority leader and whip, Chan served in several committees during her time in the Assembly. She served as a Chair of the Health committee, Chair of the Select Committee on Language Access to State Services, and Vice Chair of the Asian-Pacific Islander Legislative Caucus. She also served as a member of the committees on Aging and Long Term Care, Jobs, Economic Development, Government Organization, and Banking and Finance. Chan was a member of the Legislative Women's Caucus, Environmental Caucus, Internet Caucus and Smart Growth Caucus.

During her six years in the Assembly, she passed more than 70 bills and resolutions. Her primary legislative areas include health care, senior services, early childhood education, environmental health, jobs and economic development. Chan authored legislation to phase out birth defect and cancer causing chemicals in California. Chan expanded preschool opportunities for toddlers by working to gain $100 million in the state budget. She also carried landmark legislation to make affordable health insurance available to 800,000 uninsured California children.

In 2006, Chan termed out of the Assembly.

=== Run for State Senate ===
In 2003, Chan considered running for Don Perata's State Senate District 9 seat. Because Perata had won his seat during a special election, it was unclear whether he would be termed out in 2004. California Attorney General Bill Lockyer issued a legal opinion declaring that it was within California term limits law for Perata to stand for reelection. Chan hired her own lawyers who offered the opposite finding, but she did not challenge Perata in the primary or contest Lockyer's findings. In 2005, Chan briefly considered a run for Alameda County Board of Supervisors, District 3, but decided against because she wanted to focus her attention on legislating in 2006 and on her 2008 Senate campaign.

In 2008 Chan ran for the District 9 seat against current Berkeley Assembly member Loni Hancock. The race was hard-fought and controversial. On May 29 on KQED's Forum show, Chan acknowledged that she sent campaign mailers featuring a large photo of Barack Obama without his endorsement and without his permission. There was a great deal of confusion over who incumbent Senator Perata supported, with both Hancock and Chan claiming his endorsement in direct mail and robocalls. Loni Hancock bested Chan in a low-turnout Democratic primary in June 2008.

=== Return to Alameda County Board of Supervisors ===
In 2010, Chan ran for her old seat on the Alameda County Board of Supervisors. and won with 54.6% of the vote. She was re-elected unopposed in 2014 and 2018, as a nonpartisan candidate. In 2015, she abandoned another attempt to run for State Senate District 9 because of the fundraising required.

One of Chan's most significant accomplishments as supervisor was keeping San Leandro Hospital open after Sutter Health announced it would close the facility. At the time, San Leandro Hospital was the sole acute care facility in San Leandro with its emergency room serving 26,478 people and had 3,599 inpatient admissions annually. Chan proposed that the City of San Leandro donate $1 million per year for three years. This amount, combined with funds from Alameda County, provided a subsidy to keep the hospital open until it could achieve profitability as part of its transfer to public ownership by the Alameda Health System. San Leandro Mayor Stephen H. Cassidy credited Chan with saving the hospital: "Wilma Chan's work was extraordinary. Our deal was dead, but she persisted, sustained it, and moved it forward."

== Personal life ==
Chan was a resident of Oakland for more than 20 years and later moved to Alameda. She was married to a public school teacher and has two children and two grandchildren.

On November 3, 2021, while walking her dog, Chan was struck by the driver of a vehicle near the intersection of Shore Line Drive and Grand Street in Alameda. She suffered major head injuries and was transported to Highland Hospital where she was pronounced dead at 2:30 p.m. after unsuccessful life-saving efforts.

California Assembly
Preceded by Audie Bock	California State Assemblywoman, 16th District; 2000–2006	Succeeded by Sandré Swanson
Political offices
Preceded by Gloria Romero	Majority Whip of the California State Assembly; 2000–2002	Succeeded by Fabian Núñez
Preceded by Kevin Shelley	Majority Leader of the California State Assembly; 2002–2004	Succeeded by Dario Frommer
