= Hispanics and Latinos in California =

Ethnic group in the U.S. state of California

Hispanos y Latinos en California
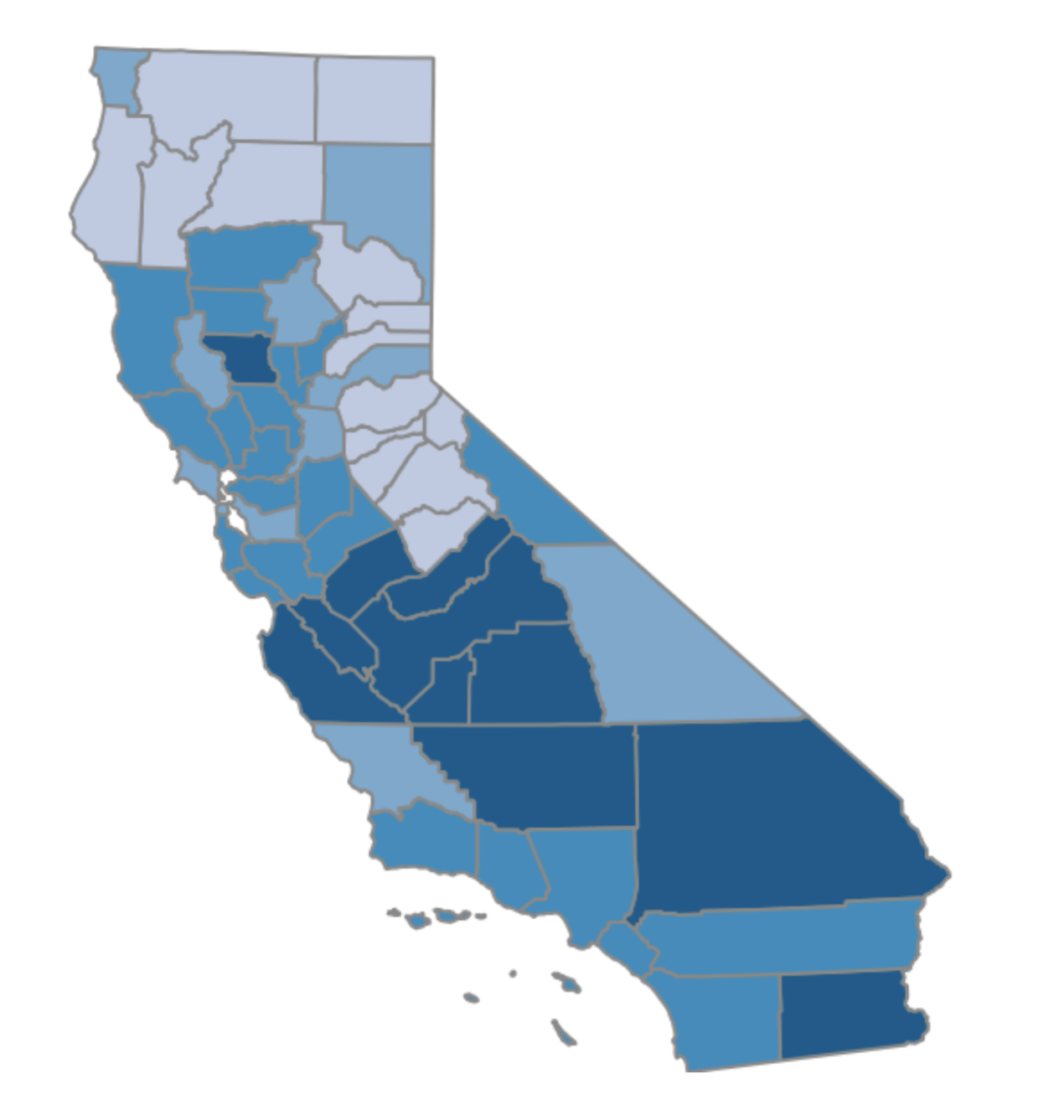
- Counties of California by percentage of Hispanics and Latinos in the 2020 Census: 50% or more 25-49% 15-24% 5-15%

Total population
- 39.4% (2020)

Regions with significant populations
- Imperial County: 79.6%
- Greater Los Angeles: 44.8%
- San Diego County: 31.6%
- San Francisco Bay Area: 23%

Languages
- American Spanish, American English, Indigenous languages, Spanglish

Religion
- Predominantly Roman Catholicism

Related ethnic groups
- Hispanic and Latino Americans

Hispanic and Latino Californians are residents of the state of California who are of full or partial Hispanic or Latino ancestry. As of the 2020 U.S. Census, Hispanics and Latinos of any race were 39.4% of the state's population, making it the largest ethnicity in California.

Californios (regional Californian Spanish for "Californians") is a term to refer to the Californian Hispanic community, which has existed in California since 1683, and which is mainly of varying Spanish and Mexican national origin, and from racially broad groups such as Criollo Spaniards and Mestizos, with both European and Amerindian ancestry. Most would identify as Mexican Americans or as Chicanos.

== History ==
The Hispanic presence in California has existed since the earliest European exploration of the region, the first such explorer of the California coast being Portuguese explorer João Rodrigues Cabrilho (Juan Rodriguez Cabrillo). Cabrillo was commissioned by the Viceroy of New Spain (Mexico) and in 1542 he sailed into what is now San Diego, California. He continued north as far as Pt. Reyes, California.

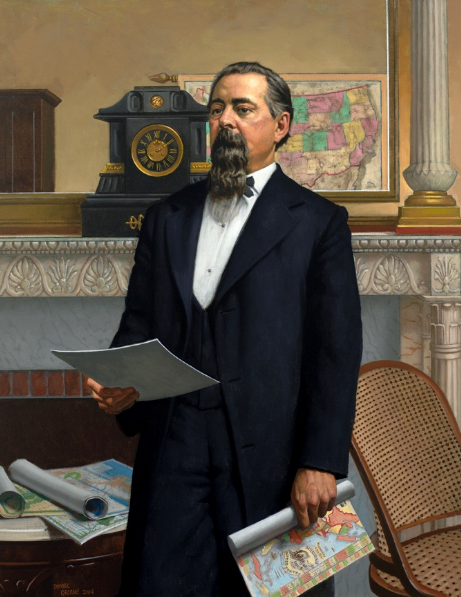
Romualdo Pacheco, the First Hispanic Governor of California since the American Conquest of California.

California became part of the Spanish trading route, but was not well explored due to its remoteness from Europe and challenging terrain. In the 1700s, it was claimed by Spain which divided California into two parts, Baja California and Alta California, as provinces of New Spain (Mexico). Baja or lower California consisted of the Baja Peninsula and terminated roughly at San Diego, California where Alta California started. After the establishment of Missions in Alta California after 1769, the Spanish treated Baja California and Alta California as a single administrative unit, part of the Viceroyalty of New Spain, with Monterey, California, as its capital.

In 1821, Mexico gained its independence from Spain, and Alta California became one of the three interior provinces in the First Mexican Empire north of the Rio Grande, along with Texas and New Mexico. The Mexican government was unable to keep full control of its peripheral provinces, leading to the inundation of American immigrants inside its borders and the subsequent annexation of California by the United States in 1846. During Mexican rule, California was sparsely populated, with only a few thousand Mexican residents, compared to tens of thousands of Native Americans, and a handful of Yankee entrepreneurs. At the time of the annexation, "foreigners already outnumbered Californians of Spanish ancestry 9,000 to 7,500". The advent of the California Gold Rush in 1848 led to a massive influx of settlers – including thousands of Mexican miners, but also tens of thousands of Americans from the East. Other substantial immigrant groups included Chileans, Peruvians, and Chinese people. The Mexican Revolution also brought many refugees to California, including many Chinese Mexicans who fled Mexico's anti-Chinese sentiment during the war and settled in the Imperial Valley.

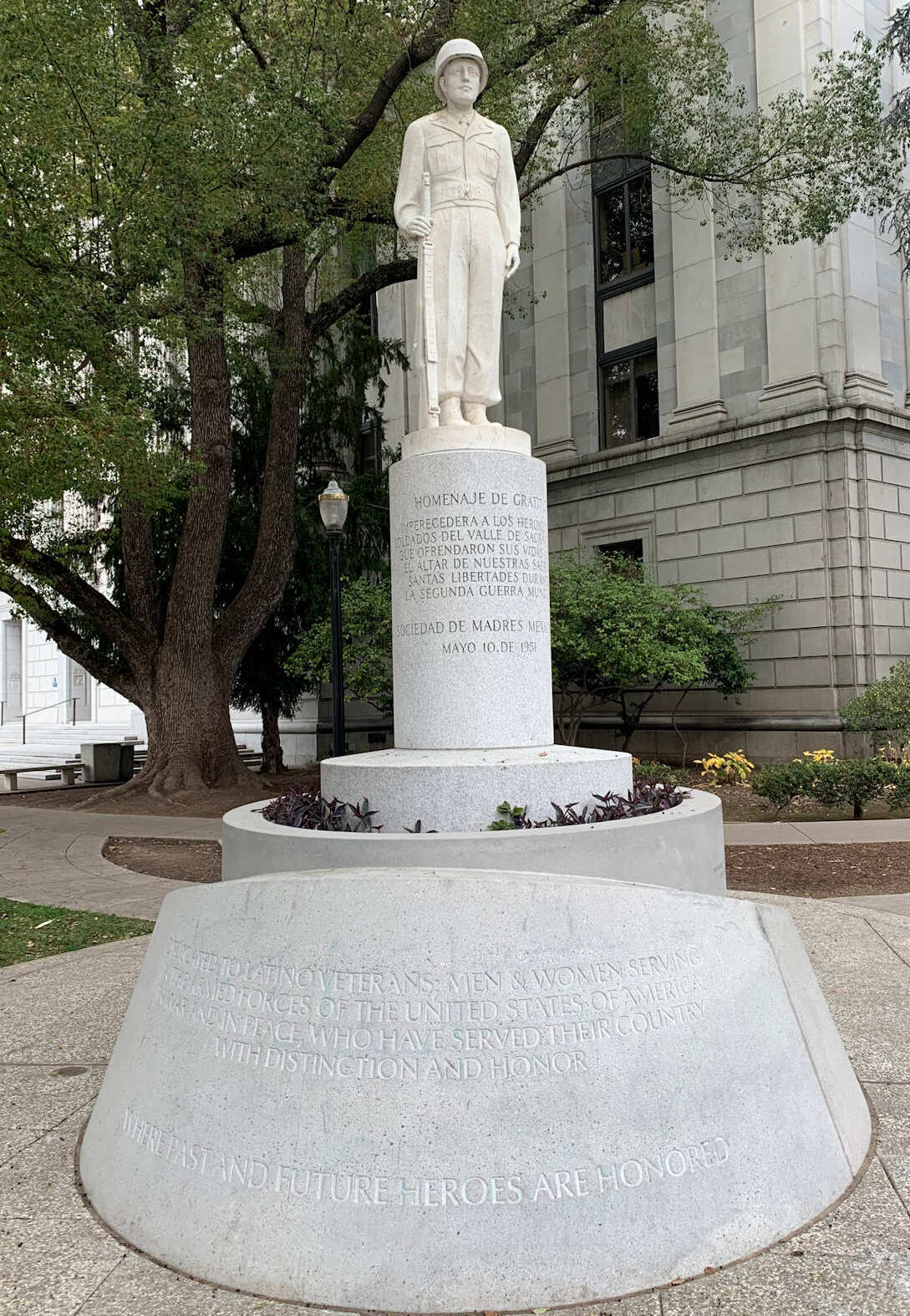
El Soldado Memorial to Mexican-American/Chicano veterans, in Sacramento.

In the early 1930s, the US began repatriating those of Mexican descent to Mexico, of which 1/5th of California Mexicans were repatriated by 1932.

During the first half of the 20th century, Mexican-American workers formed unions of their own and joined integrated unions. The most significant union struggle involving Mexican Americans was the effort to organize agricultural workers and the United Farm Workers' long strike and boycott aimed at grape growers in the San Joaquin and Coachella valleys in the late 1960s. Leaders César Chávez and Dolores Huerta gained national prominence as they led a workers' rights organization that helped workers get unemployment insurance to an effective union of farmworkers almost overnight. The struggle to protect rights and sustainable wages for migrant workers has continued.

== Demographics ==
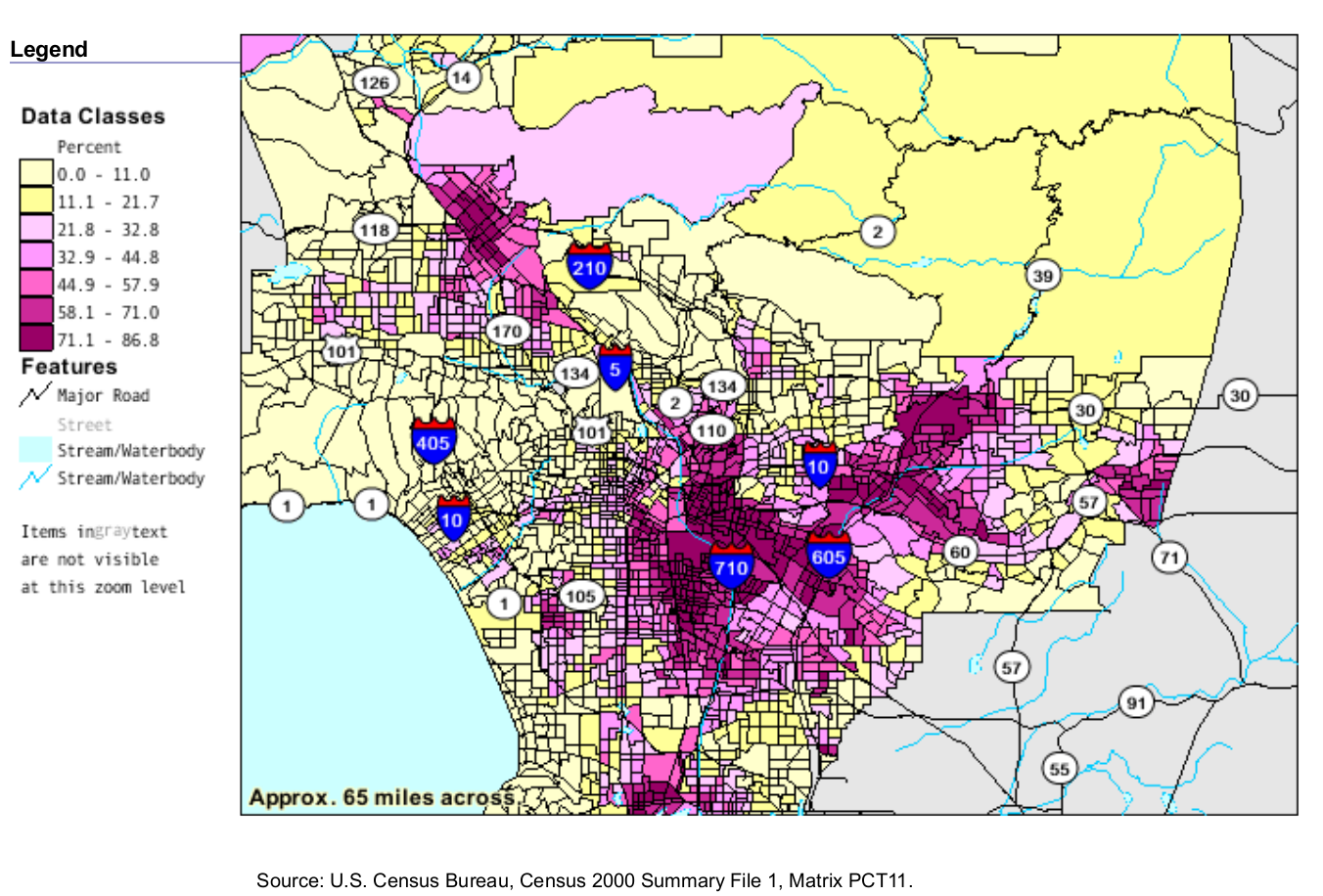
Map of Los Angeles County showing percentage of population self-identified as Mexican in ancestry or national origin by census tracts. Heaviest concentrations are in East Los Angeles, Echo Park/Silver Lake, South Los Angeles, and San Pedro/Wilmington.

Spanish is the state's second most spoken language. Areas with especially large Spanish speaking populations include the Los Angeles metropolitan area, San Bernardino, Riverside, the California-Mexico border counties of San Diego and Imperial (largest percentage in all of CA), and the San Joaquin Valley. Mexican American is the largest ethnicity in half the state's 58 counties.

By ethnicity, 38.1% of the total population is Hispanic (of any race). New Mexico and Texas have higher percentages of Hispanics, but California has the highest total number of Hispanics of any U.S. state. As of July 1, 2013, it is estimated that California's Hispanic population has equaled the population of non-Hispanic whites. Hispanics, mainly Mexican Americans, form major portions of the population of Southern California, especially in Los Angeles, as well as the San Joaquin Valley. The city of Los Angeles is often said to be the largest Mexican community in the United States. Census records kept track of the growth since 1850, but Hispanos and Mexican Americans have lived in California since the Spanish period. However, the number and percentage population of Hispanics living in California increased rapidly in the late 20th century. The result is that, today, Hispanics are the largest ethnic group in Los Angeles County, at over 40 percent of the county's population. Hispanics are predominantly concentrated in the older eastern and southern suburbs surrounding downtown Los Angeles and northern Long Beach, the southern/eastern San Fernando Valley, and the San Gabriel/Pomona Valleys. They also comprise sizable communities in Arvin, Bakersfield, Delano, El Monte, Fontana, Fresno, Indio, La Puente, Ontario, Oxnard, Riverside, Sacramento, San Bernardino, San Diego, San José, Santa Barbara, Santa Maria, Stockton, Vallejo, Watsonville and Yuba City. In Santa Ana in Orange County, Hispanics comprise 75 percent of the population. Nearby Anaheim is over half Hispanic, and Orange County's population is 30–35 percent Hispanic.

The Imperial Valley on the U.S.-Mexican border is about 82-87% Hispanic, including many descendants of Chinese Mexican refugees from the Mexican Revolution. Communities with many Hispanics can also be found in Riverside County, especially at its eastern end, and the Coachella Valley. The Central Valley has many Mexican American migrant farm workers. Hispanics are the majority (and sometimes, plurality) in 14 other counties: Colusa, Fresno, Glenn, Kern, Kings, Los Angeles (the county is 45% Latino), Madera, Merced, Monterey (esp. the Salinas area), San Benito, San Bernardino, Santa Cruz (estimated 30–40% due to migrant labor patterns), Tulare and Yolo counties.

Hispanics make up at least 20% of the San Francisco Bay Area. Many live in San Mateo, Alameda and Santa Clara counties, as well in San Francisco. The Napa Valley and Salinas Valley have predominantly Hispanic communities established by migrant farm workers. San Jose is about 30–35 percent Hispanic, the largest Hispanic community in northern California, while the Mission District, San Francisco and Lower/West Oakland has barrios established by Mexican and Hispanic American immigrants. The Mexican American communities of East Los Angeles and Logan Heights, San Diego, as well the San Joaquin Valley and Riverside county (almost half the population) are centers of historic Chicano and Hispanic cultures.

Most of the state's Hispanics have Mexican ancestry, but there are many Cuban Americans, Puerto Ricans, Guatemalan Americans, Honduran Americans, Salvadoran Americans, and Nicaraguan Americans, Chilean Americans, Colombian Americans and Peruvian Americans. Los Angeles has the United States' largest Central American community, as well as the largest Mexican American community since the 1910s and 1920s.

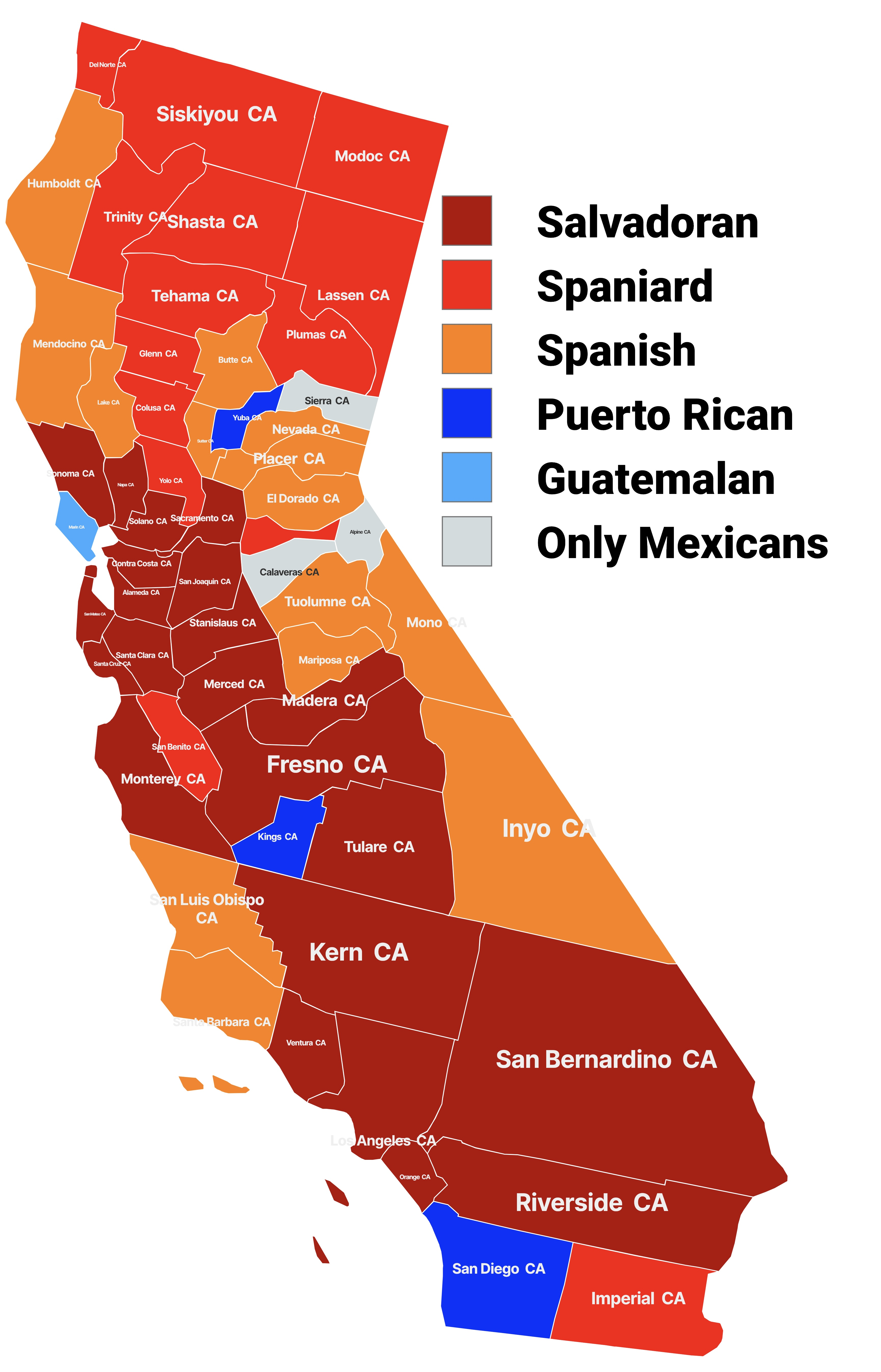
Largest Hispanic ethnic origin in California besides Mexican, per the 2020 census

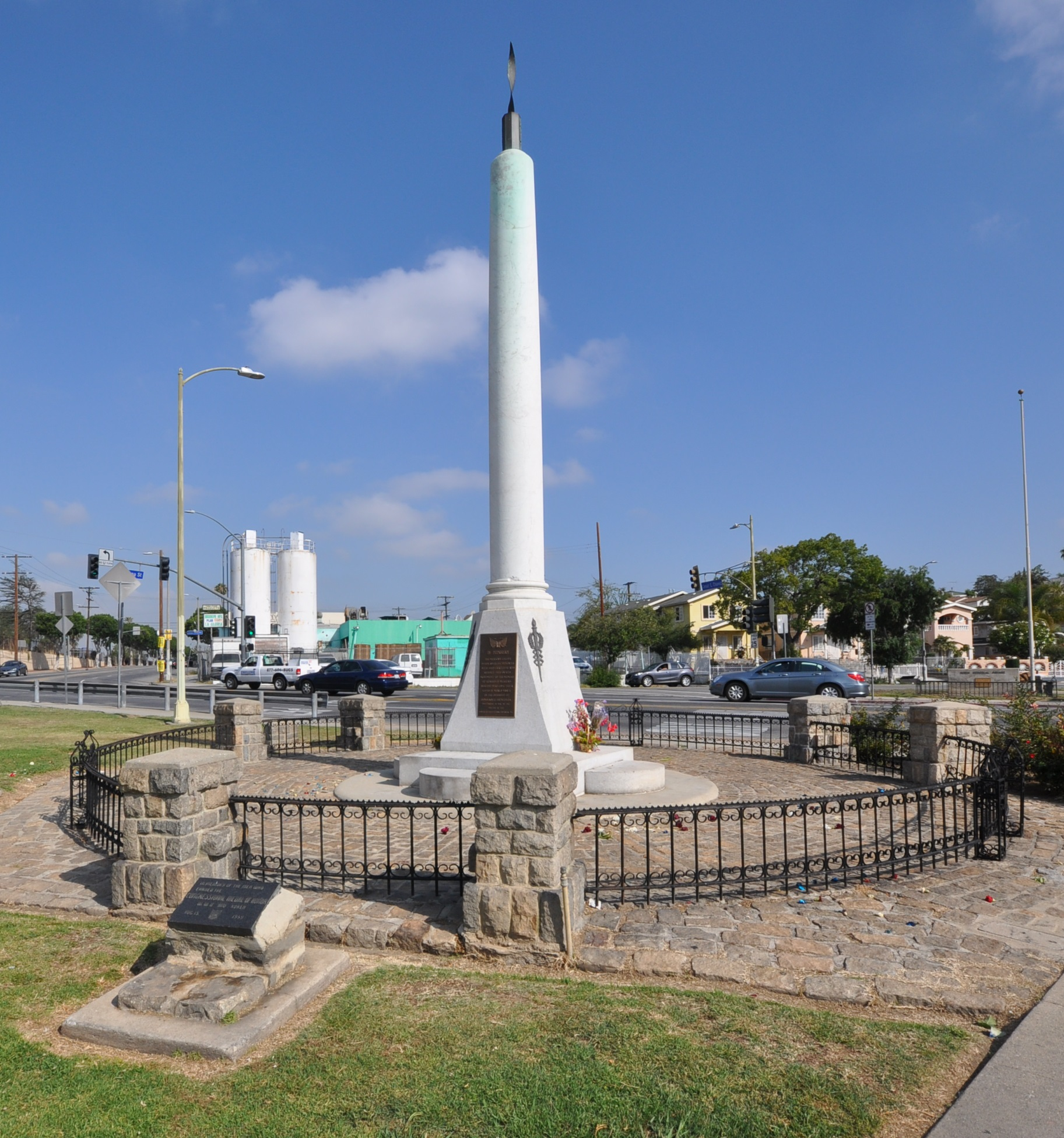
The Cinco Puntos Memorial in Los Angeles honors Mexican-American/Chicano veterans of all wars.

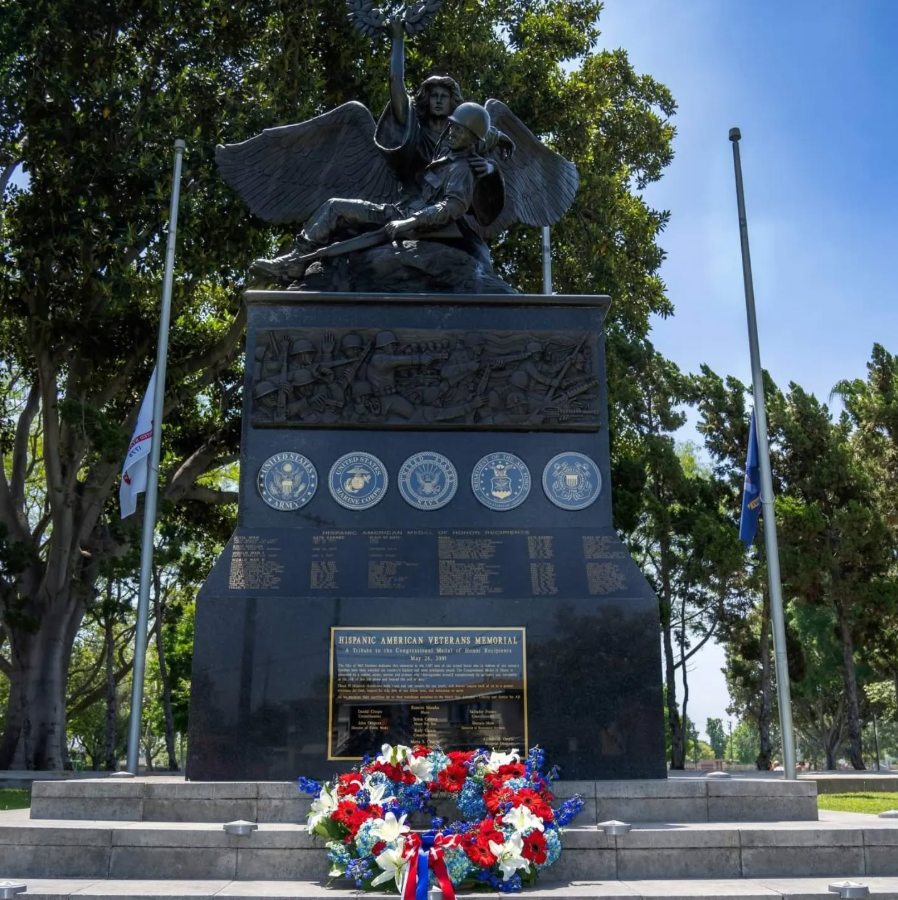
The Hispanic American Veterans Memorial in Bell Gardens.

In Mariposa County, there is a very small community of Californios or Spanish American people as they identify themselves, that dates back before the U.S. annexation of California. Hornitos is home to an estimated 1,000 people and many are "Californio". The community's "Spanish" Californio culture is closely linked with Mexico and other Hispanic American nations.

(self-identified ethnicity, not by birthplace)
Ancestry by origin (2019 surveys)	Population	%
Argentine	55,935	
Bolivian	16,392	
Chilean	27,396	
Colombian	90,552	
Costa Rican	26,741	
Cuban	92,451	
Dominican	16,422	
Ecuadorian	36,689	
Guatemalan	460,310	
Honduran	107,887	
Mexican	12,875,655	
Nicaraguan	115,973	
Panamanian	20,886	
Paraguayan	1,039	
Peruvian	108,134	
Puerto Rican	226,314	
Salvadoran	731,873	
"Spanish"	84,186	
"Spaniard"	162,356	
"Spanish American"	1,370	
Uruguayan	4,495	
Venezuelan	20,174	
All other	325,540	
Total	15,574,882	

Ancestry by region (2010 census)	Number	%
Mexicans	11,423,146	30.7%
Caribbeans	290,007	0.8%
Central Americans	1,132,520	3.0%
South Americans	293,880	0.8%
Other Hispanic	874,166	2.3%
Total		

== Spanish language in California ==
As of 2010, 28.46% (9,696,638) of California residents age 5 and older spoke Spanish at home as a primary language. California has the second highest concentration of Spanish speakers in the United States.

California's first constitution recognized Spanish language rights:

All laws, decrees, regulations, and provisions emanating from any of the three supreme powers of this State, which from their nature require publication, shall be published in English and Spanish.

— California Constitution, 1849, Art. XI Sec. 21.

By 1870, English-speaking Americans were a majority in California; in 1879, the state promulgated a new constitution under which all official proceedings were to be conducted exclusively in English, a clause that remained in effect until 1966. In 1986, California voters added a new constitutional clause, by referendum, stating that:

English is the official language of the State of California.

— California Constitution, Art. 3, Sec. 6

Spanish remains widely spoken throughout the state, and many government forms, documents, and services are bilingual, in English and Spanish. And although all official proceedings are to be conducted in English:

A person unable to understand English who is charged with a crime has a right to an interpreter throughout the proceedings.

— California Constitution, Art. 1. Sec. 14

== Historic Hispanic/Latino population ==
=== Colonial and Mexican era ===
Population Statistics of Alta California Province (including California, Nevada, Utah and parts of Arizona, Colorado and Wyoming) (Note: Almost the entire Spanish and mixed-race population lived in present-day California.)
Year	Pop Spaniards/Mexican/Criollo/Mestizos	% pop
1769	300 (first foundation in Spanish California)	
1781	600 (Spaniards)	
1783	1,000 (Spaniards)	
1790 (Revillagigedo census)	19,800 (mostly mestizos and more than 1,100 Spaniards)	N/A
1800	1,800 (Spaniards)	N/A
1810	2,000 (Spaniards)	N/A
1820	3,270 (Spaniards)	N/A
1838	3,500 (Spaniards) (Faxon D. Atherton estimations)	N/A
1845	7,300 (Spaniards and some Americans) (Weber estimations (1982:206), although other sources indicated that in 1846 11,500 Californians were of Spaniard or Mexican descent)	N/A

=== California as part of the United States ===
California	Number of people of Mexican Origin (1910-1930) and of Hispanic/Latino Origin (1940-2020) in California^{[a]}	+% of Population of Mexican Origin (1910-1930) and of Hispanic/Latino Origin (1940-2020) in California
1850	15,000	15% of the Non-Amerindian population/ 17%
1860	N/A	N/A
1870	22,409	4%
1880	42,311	N/A
1890	48,535	4%
1900	47,112	N/A
1910	49,928 - 82,217	2.1%
1920	126,793 - 155,085	3.7%
1930	386,053 - 419,309	6.8%
1940	415,113	6.0%
1950	762,208	7.2%
1960	1,430,265	9.1%
1970	2,738,513 (15% sample)	13.7%
1980	4,544,331	19.2%
1990	7,687,938	25.8%
2000	10,966,556	32.4%
2010	14,013,719	37.6%
2020	15,579,652	39.4%

== See also ==
- Bibliography of Los Angeles
- Bibliography of California history
- Californio
- Chicano
- History of Mexican Americans in Los Angeles
- History of Central Americans in Los Angeles
- Hispanic and Latino Americans in San Francisco
- Salvadoran diaspora in Los Angeles
- Demographics of California
- Mexifornia
- Hispanics and Latinos in San Diego
