= California's 16th State Assembly district =

American legislative district

Current assemblymember
| Rebecca Bauer-Kahan; D–Orinda |
- Population (2020): 516,981
- Demographics: 51.01% White; 1.93% Black; 11.20% Latino; 29.16% Asian; 0.18% Native American; 0.17% Hawaiian/Pacific Islander; 0.58% other; 0.60% remainder of multiracial

California's 16th State Assembly district is one of 80 California State Assembly districts. It is currently represented by Democrat Rebecca Bauer-Kahan of Orinda.

== District profile ==
The district is located in the East Bay. It consists of suburbs east of the Berkeley Hills, including Lamorinda, part of the Tri-Valley, and most of Walnut Creek. During Catharine Baker's time in office, it was the most Democratic seat held by a Republican in the Assembly.

Alameda County – (11.78%)

- Dublin – (60.56%)
- Livermore
- Pleasanton – (79.97%)

Contra Costa County – (27.22%)

- Danville
- Lafayette
- Moraga
- Orinda
- San Ramon
- Walnut Creek – (99.50%)

== Election results from statewide races ==
| Year | Office | Results |
|---|---|---|
| 2022 | Governor | Newsom 65 – 35% |
| 2022 | Senator | Padilla 66.3 – 33.7% |
| 2021 | Recall | No 67.9 – 32.1% |
| 2020 | President | Biden 69 – 28.9% |
| 2018 | Governor | Newsom 63.2 – 36.8% |
| 2018 | Senator | Feinstein 58.1 – 41.9% |
| 2016 | President | Clinton 64.5 – 29.2% |
| 2016 | Senator | Harris 71.7 – 28.3% |
| 2014 | Governor | Brown 62.5 – 37.5% |
| 2012 | President | Obama 57.7 – 40.1% |
| 2012 | Senator | Feinstein 62.1 – 37.9% |

== List of assembly members representing the district ==
Due to redistricting, the 16th district has been moved around different parts of the state. The current iteration resulted from the 2021 redistricting by the California Citizens Redistricting Commission.

| Assembly members | Party | Years served | Counties represented | Notes |
|---|---|---|---|---|
| George H. Colby | Republican | January 5, 1885 – January 3, 1887 | Placer | |
| John Davis | Republican | January 3, 1887 – January 5, 1891 | Placer | |
| Noble Martin | Democratic | January 5, 1891 – January 2, 1893 | Placer | |
| E. D. Drees | Democratic | January 2, 1893 – January 7, 1895 | Sonoma | |
| Walter Fitch Price | Republican | January 7, 1895 – January 2, 1899 | Sonoma | |
| H. M. LeBaron | Republican | January 2, 1899 – January 1, 1901 | Sonoma | |
| Frank A. Cromwell | Republican | January 1, 1901 – January 5, 1903 | Sonoma | |
| James I. McConnell | Democratic | January 5, 1903 – January 2, 1905 | Yolo | |
| Nicholas A. Hawkins | Democratic | January 2, 1905 – January 7, 1907 | Yolo | |
| James I. McConnell | Democratic | January 7, 1907 – January 4, 1909 | Yolo | |
| Lawrence H. Wilson | Democratic | January 4, 1909 – January 6, 1913 | Yolo | |
| Will A. Dower | Democratic | January 6, 1913 – January 4, 1915 | Alpine, Calaveras, El Dorado | |
| Robert I. Kerr | Democratic | January 4, 1915 – January 8, 1917 | Alpine, Amador, Calaveras, El Dorado | |
| Charles P. Vicini | Democratic | January 8, 1917 – January 3, 1921 | Alpine, Amador, Calaveras, El Dorado | |
| Ralph McGee | Democratic | January 3, 1921 – January 8, 1923 | Alpine, Amador, Calaveras, El Dorado | |
| Ferdinand G. Stevenot | Republican | January 8, 1923 – January 5, 1925 | Alpine, Amador, Calaveras, El Dorado | |
| Harley E. Dillinger | Democratic | January 5, 1925 – January 5, 1931 | Alpine, Amador, Calaveras, El Dorado | |
| Harley E. Dillinger | Democratic | January 5, 1931 – January 2, 1933 | Alpine, Amador, Calaveras, El Dorado, Inyo, Mono, Tuolumne | |
| Eugene W. Roland | Republican | January 2, 1933 – January 7, 1935 | Alameda | |
| Arthur H. Breed Jr. | Republican | January 7, 1935 – January 2, 1939 | Alameda | |
| Arthur W. Carlson | Republican | January 2, 1939 – January 8, 1945 | Alameda | |
| Marvin Birkett Sherwin | Republican | January 8, 1945 – September 7, 1953 | Alameda | Resigned from the State Assembly On September 7, 1953. |
| Vacant | | September 7, 1953 – November 25, 1953 | Alameda | |
| Walter I. Dahl | Republican | November 25, 1953 – January 7, 1963 | Alameda | Sworn in after winning special election when Sherwin resigned to be appointed as Judge on the Alameda County Superior Court. |
| Don Mulford | Republican | January 7, 1963 – January 4, 1971 | Alameda | |
| Kenneth A. Meade | Democratic | January 4, 1971 – November 30, 1974 | | |
| John Francis Foran | Democratic | December 2, 1974 – November 30, 1976 | San Francisco | |
| Art Agnos | Democratic | December 6, 1976 – January 8, 1988 | San Francisco | Resigned from the State Assembly since he became Mayor of San Francisco. |
| Vacant | | January 8, 1988 – April 14, 1988 | San Francisco | |
| John Burton | Democratic | April 14, 1988 – November 30, 1992 | San Francisco | Won special election after Art Agnos resigned. He was sworn in on April 14, 1988. |
| Barbara Lee | Democratic | December 7, 1992 – November 30, 1996 | Alameda | |
| Don Perata | Democratic | December 2, 1996 – November 30, 1998 | Alameda | |
| Vacant | | November 30, 1998 – April 5, 1999 | Alameda | |
| Audie Bock | Green | April 5, 1999 – November 30, 2000 | Alameda | Won the special election. First Green Party member to win an election for the California State Legislature. She was sworn in on April 5, 1999. On October 7, 1999, she changed her party registration to Independent. |
| Wilma Chan | Democratic | December 4, 2000 – November 30, 2006 | Alameda | |
| Sandré Swanson | Democratic | December 4, 2006 – November 30, 2012 | Alameda | |
| Joan Buchanan | Democratic | December 3, 2012 – November 30, 2014 | Alameda, Contra Costa | |
| Catharine Baker | Republican | December 1, 2014 – November 30, 2018 | Alameda, Contra Costa | |
| Rebecca Bauer-Kahan | Democratic | December 3, 2018 – present | Alameda, Contra Costa | |

== Election results (1990–present) ==
=== 2024 ===
2024 California State Assembly 16th district election
Primary election
| Party | Candidate | Votes | % |
|---|---|---|---|
| Democratic | Rebecca Bauer-Kahan (incumbent) | 84,290 | 65.5 |
| Republican | Joseph Rubay | 44,351 | 34.5 |
| Total votes | | 128,641 | 100.0 |
General election
| Democratic | Rebecca Bauer-Kahan (incumbent) | 161,029 | 64.1 |
| Republican | Joseph Rubay | 90,136 | 35.9 |
| Total votes | | 251,165 | 100.0 |
| Democratic hold | | | |

=== 2022 ===
2022 California State Assembly 16th district election
Primary election
| Party | Candidate | Votes | % |
|---|---|---|---|
| Democratic | Rebecca Bauer-Kahan (incumbent) | 80,054 | 66.6 |
| Republican | Joseph A. Rubay | 40,203 | 33.4 |
| Total votes | | 120,257 | 100.0 |
General election
| Democratic | Rebecca Bauer-Kahan (incumbent) | 130,813 | 65.7 |
| Republican | Joseph A. Rubay | 68,149 | 34.3 |
| Total votes | | 198,962 | 100.0 |
| Democratic hold | | | |

=== 2020 ===
2020 California State Assembly 16th district election
Primary election
| Party | Candidate | Votes | % |
|---|---|---|---|
| Democratic | Rebecca Bauer-Kahan (incumbent) | 109,852 | 68.3 |
| Republican | Joseph A. Rubay | 51,097 | 31.7 |
| Total votes | | 160,949 | 100.0 |
General election
| Democratic | Rebecca Bauer-Kahan (incumbent) | 192,977 | 67.4 |
| Republican | Joseph A. Rubay | 93,137 | 32.6 |
| Total votes | | 286,114 | 100.0 |
| Democratic hold | | | |

=== 2018 ===
2018 California State Assembly 16th district election
Primary election
| Party | Candidate | Votes | % |
|---|---|---|---|
| Republican | Catharine Baker (incumbent) | 69,360 | 56.6 |
| Democratic | Rebecca Bauer-Kahan | 53,269 | 43.4 |
| Total votes | | 122,629 | 100.0 |
General election
| Democratic | Rebecca Bauer-Kahan | 111,222 | 51.0 |
| Republican | Catharine Baker (incumbent) | 106,683 | 49.0 |
| Total votes | | 217,905 | 100.0 |
| Democratic gain from Republican | | | |

=== 2016 ===
2016 California State Assembly 16th district election
Primary election
| Party | Candidate | Votes | % |
|---|---|---|---|
| Republican | Catharine Baker (incumbent) | 71,906 | 53.2 |
| Democratic | Cheryl Cook-Kallio | 63,307 | 46.8 |
| Total votes | | 135,213 | 100.0 |
General election
| Republican | Catharine Baker (incumbent) | 129,585 | 55.9 |
| Democratic | Cheryl Cook-Kallio | 102,290 | 44.1 |
| Total votes | | 231,875 | 100.0 |
| Republican hold | | | |

=== 2014 ===
2014 California State Assembly 16th district election
Primary election
| Party | Candidate | Votes | % |
|---|---|---|---|
| Republican | Catharine Baker | 31,632 | 36.7 |
| Democratic | Tim Sbranti | 25,217 | 29.2 |
| Democratic | Steve Glazer | 19,636 | 22.8 |
| Democratic | Newell Arnerich | 9,794 | 11.4 |
| Total votes | | 86,279 | 100.0 |
General election
| Republican | Catharine Baker | 71,452 | 51.6 |
| Democratic | Tim Sbranti | 67,152 | 48.4 |
| Total votes | | 138,604 | 100.0 |
| Republican gain from Democratic | | | |

=== 2012 ===
2012 California State Assembly 16th district election
Primary election
| Party | Candidate | Votes | % |
|---|---|---|---|
| Democratic | Joan Buchanan (incumbent) | 54,368 | 56.7 |
| Republican | Al Phillips | 41,444 | 43.3 |
| Total votes | | 95,812 | 100.0 |
General election
| Democratic | Joan Buchanan (incumbent) | 125,952 | 59.2 |
| Republican | Al Phillips | 86,803 | 40.8 |
| Total votes | | 212,755 | 100.0 |
| Democratic hold | | | |

=== 2010 ===
2010 California State Assembly 16th district election
| Party | Candidate | Votes | % |
|---|---|---|---|
| Democratic | Sandré Swanson (incumbent) | 99,082 | 83.5 |
| Republican | James I. "Jim" Faison | 14,692 | 12.4 |
| Libertarian | Lisa D. Ringer | 4,909 | 4.1 |
| Total votes | | 118,683 | 100.0 |
| Democratic hold | | | |

=== 2008 ===
2008 California State Assembly 16th district election
| Party | Candidate | Votes | % |
|---|---|---|---|
| Democratic | Sandré Swanson (incumbent) | 136,066 | 87.9 |
| Republican | Jim Faison | 18,817 | 12.1 |
| Total votes | | 154,883 | 100.0 |
| Democratic hold | | | |

=== 2006 ===
2006 California State Assembly 16th district election
| Party | Candidate | Votes | % |
|---|---|---|---|
| Democratic | Sandré Swanson | 91,696 | 90.1 |
| Peace and Freedom | Edward Ytuarte | 10,071 | 9.9 |
| Total votes | | 101,767 | 100.0 |
| Democratic hold | | | |

=== 2004 ===
2004 California State Assembly 16th district election
| Party | Candidate | Votes | % |
|---|---|---|---|
| Democratic | Wilma Chan (incumbent) | 126,292 | 88.2 |
| Republican | Jerald Udinsky | 16,903 | 11.8 |
| Total votes | | 143,195 | 100.0 |
| Democratic hold | | | |

=== 2002 ===
2002 California State Assembly 16th district election
| Party | Candidate | Votes | % |
|---|---|---|---|
| Democratic | Wilma Chan (incumbent) | 77,744 | 84.2 |
| Republican | George J. Nugent | 11,634 | 12.6 |
| Libertarian | Richard E. Armstrong | 2,976 | 3.2 |
| Total votes | | 92,354 | 100.0 |
| Democratic hold | | | |

=== 2000 ===
2000 California State Assembly 16th district election
| Party | Candidate | Votes | % |
|---|---|---|---|
| Democratic | Wilma Chan | 78,347 | 67.3 |
| Independent | Audie Bock (incumbent) | 25,714 | 22.1 |
| Republican | Timothy B. McCormick | 10,004 | 8.6 |
| Libertarian | Richard E. Armstrong | 2,365 | 2.0 |
| Total votes | | 116,430 | 100.0 |
| Democratic gain from Independent | | | |

=== 1999 (special) ===
1999 California State Assembly 16th district special election Vacancy resulting from the resignation of Don Perata
| Party | Candidate | Votes | % |
|---|---|---|---|
| Green | Audie Bock | 14,674 | 50.6 |
| Democratic | Elihu Harris | 14,347 | 49.4 |
| No party | Rashaad Ali | 5 | 0.0 |
| Total votes | | 29,026 | 100.0 |
| Green gain from Democratic | | | |

=== 1998 ===
1998 California State Assembly 16th district election
| Party | Candidate | Votes | % |
|---|---|---|---|
| Democratic | Don Perata (incumbent) | 71,548 | 80.3 |
| Republican | Linda Marchall | 17,517 | 19.7 |
| Total votes | | 89,065 | 100.0 |
| Democratic hold | | | |

=== 1996 ===
1996 California State Assembly 16th district election
| Party | Candidate | Votes | % |
|---|---|---|---|
| Democratic | Don Perata | 82,842 | 78.3 |
| Republican | Veronica A. Acosta | 22,925 | 21.7 |
| Total votes | | 105,767 | 100.0 |
| Democratic hold | | | |

=== 1994 ===
1994 California State Assembly 16th district election
| Party | Candidate | Votes | % |
|---|---|---|---|
| Democratic | Barbara Lee (incumbent) | 68,197 | 81.0 |
| Republican | Andre-Tascha G.R. Ham-Lamme | 15,966 | 19.0 |
| Total votes | | 84,163 | 100.0 |
| Democratic hold | | | |

=== 1992 ===
1992 California State Assembly 16th district election
| Party | Candidate | Votes | % |
|---|---|---|---|
| Democratic | Barbara Lee (incumbent) | 90,432 | 74.5 |
| Republican | David Anderson | 24,324 | 20.0 |
| Peace and Freedom | Emma Wong Mar | 6,643 | 5.5 |
| Total votes | | 121,399 | 100.0 |
| Democratic hold | | | |

=== 1990 ===
1990 California State Assembly 16th district election
| Party | Candidate | Votes | % |
|---|---|---|---|
| Democratic | John Burton (incumbent) | 57,557 | 100.0 |
| Total votes | | 57,557 | 100.0 |
| Democratic hold | | | |

== See also ==
- California State Assembly
- California State Assembly districts
- Districts in California
