= Sandré Swanson =

American politician (born 1948)

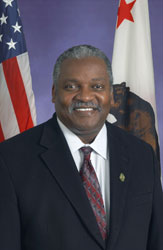

Member of the California State Assembly from the 16th district
- In office December 4, 2006 – November 30, 2012
- Preceded by: Wilma Chan
- Succeeded by: Joan Buchanan

Personal details
- Born: November 28, 1948 (age 77) Oakland, California, U.S.
- Party: Democratic
- Education: Laney College (AA); San Francisco State University (BA)

Sandré Swanson (born November 28, 1948) is an American politician who served as a member of the California State Assembly for the 16th district from 2006 to 2012.

== Early life and education ==
Swanson was born in Oakland, California. He earned an associate degree in psychology from Oakland City College and a Bachelor of Arts degree in psychology from San Francisco State University.

== Career ==
Swanson began his political career in 1971 as a member of the Oakland Anti-Poverty Board. He later worked as the advance team manager for Shirley Chisholm's 1972 presidential campaign. From 1973 to 1998, he served as a district director and a senior policy advisor to then Congressman-Ron Dellums.

Swanson later served as chief of staff to Congresswoman Barbara Lee. He endorsed Barack Obama in the 2008 presidential election.

In 2024, Sandré Swanson ran for California's 7th State Senatorial district, ending up in fifth place in the primary.
