= Rebecca Bauer-Kahan =

Member of the California State Assembly (born 1978)

Member of the California State Assembly from the 16th district
- Incumbent
- Assumed office December 3, 2018
- Preceded by: Catharine Baker

Personal details
- Born: Rebecca Beth Bauer; October 28, 1978 (age 48) Portola Valley, California, U.S.
- Party: Democratic
- Spouse: Darren Kahan (m. 2007)
- Children: 3
- Education: University of Pennsylvania (BA); Georgetown University (JD)
- Website: Campaign website Government website

Rebecca Beth Bauer-Kahan (née Bauer; born October 28, 1978) is an American attorney and politician who has served as a member of the California State Assembly from the 16th district since 2018. A member of the Democratic Party, her district extends from Lamorinda to the Tri-Valley region of the San Francisco Bay Area. As the chair of the Assembly Consumer Protection and Privacy Committee, Bauer-Kahan has gained national recognition for her work on artificial intelligence regulation. In addition to her work on artificial intelligence policy, she has advocated for women's rights, reproductive rights, and environmental protection.

== Early life and education ==
Bauer-Kahan was born Rebecca Beth Bauer in Portola Valley, California, on October 28, 1978. She is the youngest child in a Jewish family. Her grandparents came to the United States as refugees in 1939 after fleeing Austria to escape the Holocaust.

Bauer-Kahan spent her childhood in the Bay Area and attended Bay Area public schools. In 2000, she graduated from the University of Pennsylvania with a bachelor of arts in psychology. She then enrolled at Georgetown University and graduated with a juris doctor in 2004.

== Early career ==
Bauer-Kahan practiced law in Washington, D.C. before returning to the Bay Area in 2005. As an attorney specializing in environmental law, she led internal investigations into corporations to improve their environmental practices and worked with tech companies on intellectual property cases. She was also an immigration attorney for the International Refugee Assistance Project, and on their behalf in 2017, she coordinated legal services at San Francisco International Airport to assist refugees and immigrants impacted by the Trump administration’s travel ban.

In 2010, Bauer-Kahan became a law professor at Santa Clara University, teaching appellate law and legal research and writing. She joined the faculty of Golden Gate University as a law professor in 2014. She decided to enter politics following the 2016 presidential election.

== California State Assembly ==
=== Tenure ===
Bauer-Kahan was first elected to the California State Assembly in 2018, narrowly defeating Republican incumbent Catharine Baker.

Soon after being sworn in, Bauer-Kahan ascended to a leadership role, becoming assistant speaker pro tempore of the Assembly; she left her leadership role after one term. She also founded the Select Committee on Reproductive Health—the first committee of its kind in the nation—during her first term.

To date, Bauer-Kahan has authored over 80 pieces of legislation that have been signed into law. Her legislation covers a variety of topics, such as Artificial Intelligence, Consumer Privacy, Utility and Homeowners Insurance Reform, gun control, women's health, reproductive rights, and environmental protection. Among Bauer-Kahan's major legislative initiatives are Adam's Law (SB 1119), which establishes safety requirements for AI companion chatbots used by children, including risk assessments, crisis-response measures, parental controls, and independent audits, and AB 1405, which establishes a state registry for AI auditors and standards for their independence, transparency, and integrity. She also serves on 12 committees and currently chairs the Privacy and Consumer Protection Committee and the Select Committee on Reproductive Health. Bauer-Kahan is a member of the California Legislative Progressive Caucus.

In May 2024 she spoke along with Juan Alanis in front of the California Assembly to support Assembly Bill 3080, requiring age verification on porn sites, which passed to the California Senate with 65 "yes" votes and 15 abstains. She mentioned the statistic that about 40% of college women report being choked during sexual encounters, saying that it was the result of porn viewing, describing the bill as being about "making sure [our children] learn healthy behaviours."

Bauer-Kahan has also advocated reforms to California's homeowners' insurance market amid growing wildfire risks and insurance nonrenewals. She secured $5 million in state funding for wildfire prevention and evacuation preparedness projects in her assembly district, including vegetation clearance, wildfire mitigation, and evacuation planning. She authored AB 290, enacted in 2025, which requires the California FAIR plan to offer automatic premium payments and provides protections against lapses in coverage due to missed payments. In 2026, she authored AB 2724, which requires annual updates to the state's identification of insurance distressed areas, including wildfire prone communities, to encourage insurers to expand coverage in those areas.

==== Significant legislation ====
- Plastic Bag Ban - SB 1053: bans the distribution of plastic bags at grocery store checkouts.
- Protecting Reproductive Health Clinics - AB 2099: Protects abortion care by increasing penalties for harassing reproductive patients and providers.
- Abortion Medical Privacy - AB 352: puts up guardrails on cross-state sharing of medical records to protect abortion patients and providers across the country.
- AB 1666: protects abortion patients and providers in California from civil lawsuits brought under other states' abortion laws. AB 1666 was an urgency law, signed following the U.S. Supreme Court's decision to overturn Roe v. Wade.
- Mental Health and Suicide Prevention Phone Line - AB 988: The Miles Hall Lifeline Act creates an alternative to 911 for individuals having a mental health crisis by creating an easy three-digit phone number – 988 – for immediate, non-police, response of mental health support, including in-person support from mental health professionals.
- Elimination of the “Pink Tax” - AB 1287: Removes price-based gender discrimination, ensuring women's equal access to commercial goods by prohibiting the arbitrary higher pricing of identical products just because of the gender they are marketed to - known as the "Pink Tax.”
- Covered California Extension - AB 1309: Allows more Californians access to affordable health care by shifting the open enrollment period by 15 days, and eliminates lapses in coverage for those who purchase health insurance through the Covered California Health Exchange or the individual health exchange market.
- Firearm Printing Prevention Act - AB 2047: requires 3D printers sold in California to include technology that checks digital files and blocks printing firearms or machine gun conversion devices once state standards are established, helping prevent the illegal manufacture of untraceable guns.
- Adam's Law - SB 1119: establishes stronger safety rules for AI companion chatbots used by Children, including provisions such as age checks, parental controls, crisis support and restrictions on harmful or emotionally manipulative responses to help protect minors from self-harm and other online harms. The law is named after Adam Raine, a California teenager who tragically died in 2025 after ChatGPT coached him to end his life.
- Social Media: Warning Labels - AB 56: sponsored by California Attorney General Rob Bonta, AB 56 requires platforms to display mental health warning labels (akin to a cigarette warning label), particularly addressing the mental health crisis among young people who spend excessive time on social media.

==== Committees ====
Standing Committees

- Privacy and Consumer Protection, Chair
- Insurance
- Judiciary
- Natural Resources

Select Committees

- Select Committee on Reproductive Health, Chair
- Select Committee on California's Mental Health Crisis
- Select Committee on Cybersecurity

Joint Committees

- Joint Legislative Committee on Climate Change Policies

==== Caucus memberships ====
- Assembly Democratic Caucus
- Bay Area Caucus
- Environmental Legislative Caucus
- Legislative Jewish Caucus
- Legislative Progressive Caucus
- Legislative Technology and Innovation Caucus

== Personal life ==
Bauer-Kahan married Darren Kahan in 2007. They have three children together, and they live in Orinda, California.

== Electoral history ==
2018 California State Assembly 16th district election
Primary election
Party	Candidate	Votes	%
Republican	Catharine Baker (incumbent)	69,360	56.6
Democratic	Rebecca Bauer-Kahan	53,269	43.4
Total votes		122,629	100.0
General election
Democratic	Rebecca Bauer-Kahan	111,222	51.0
Republican	Catharine Baker (incumbent)	106,683	49.0
Total votes		217,905	100.0
Democratic gain from Republican			

2020 California State Assembly 16th district election
Primary election
Party	Candidate	Votes	%
Democratic	Rebecca Bauer-Kahan (incumbent)	109,852	68.3
Republican	Joseph A. Rubay	51,097	31.7
Total votes		160,949	100.0
General election
Democratic	Rebecca Bauer-Kahan (incumbent)	192,977	67.4
Republican	Joseph A. Rubay	93,137	32.6
Total votes		286,114	100.0
Democratic hold			

2022 California State Assembly 16th district election
Primary election
Party	Candidate	Votes	%
Democratic	Rebecca Bauer-Kahan (incumbent)	80,054	66.6
Republican	Joseph A. Rubay	40,203	33.4
Total votes		120,257	100.0
General election
Democratic	Rebecca Bauer-Kahan (incumbent)	130,813	65.7
Republican	Joseph A. Rubay	68,149	34.3
Total votes		198,962	100.0
Democratic hold			

2024 California State Assembly 16th district election
Primary election
Party	Candidate	Votes	%
Democratic	Rebecca Bauer-Kahan (incumbent)	84,290	65.5
Republican	Joseph Rubay	44,351	34.5
Total votes		128,641	100.0
General election
Democratic	Rebecca Bauer-Kahan (incumbent)	161,029	64.1
Republican	Joseph Rubay	90,136	35.9
Total votes		251,165	100.0
Democratic hold			
