= Catharine Baker =

American politician (born 1971)

Member of the California State Assembly from the 16th district
- In office December 1, 2014 – November 30, 2018
- Preceded by: Joan Buchanan
- Succeeded by: Rebecca Bauer-Kahan

Personal details
- Born: Catharine Ann Bailey; May 1, 1971 (age 55) Cathedral City, California
- Party: Republican
- Spouse: Daniel
- Children: 2
- Education: University of Chicago; UC Berkeley School of Law
- Occupation: Attorney, Politician
- Website: Assembly (archived); Campaign

Catharine Bailey Baker (born May 1, 1971) is an American attorney and politician from California. Baker was a Republican member of the California State Assembly from 2014 to 2018. She has served on the California Fair Political Practices Commission (the state's ethics commission) since 2021.

== Early life and education ==
Baker was born as Catharine Ann Bailey in Cathedral City, California.

In 1993, Baker earned a Bachelor of Arts degree in Political Science from the University of Chicago. In 2000, Baker earned a JD degree in Law from UC Berkeley School of Law.

== Legal career ==
In 2000, Baker started her legal career as a law clerk for the Honorable Alicemarie Huber Stotler, a judge for the United States District Court for the Central District of California.

In 2001, Baker practiced law as an attorney at Morrison & Foerster LLP until 2011. In 2011, Baker practiced law as an attorney at Hoge Fenton Jones & Appel.

== California State Assembly ==
On November 4, 2014, Baker won the election and became a Republican member of California State Assembly for District 16, which encompasses Lamorinda and the Tri-Valley region of the San Francisco Bay Area. Baker defeated Dublin City Councilman Tim Sbranti with 51.6% of the votes. On November 8, 2016, as an incumbent, Baker won the election and continued serving District 16. Baker defeated Pleasanton City Councilwoman Cheryl Cook-Kallio with 55.9% of the vote.

On November 6, 2018, as an incumbent, Baker sought a third term but narrowly lost the election with 49% of the votes. Baker was defeated by attorney Rebecca Bauer-Kahan.

During her time in office, Baker was the only Republican to represent any portion of the Bay Area at either the federal or the state level. A piece of legislation she authored was AB 434: State Web accessibility which came in effect on July 1, 2019.

== Electoral history ==
=== 2014 California State Assembly ===
California's 16th State Assembly district election, 2014
Primary election
Party	Candidate	Votes	%
Republican	Catharine Baker	31,632	36.7
Democratic	Tim Sbranti	25,217	29.2
Democratic	Steve Glazer	19,636	22.8
Democratic	Newell Arnerich	9,794	11.4
Total votes		86,279	100.0
General election
Republican	Catharine Baker	71,452	51.6
Democratic	Tim Sbranti	67,152	48.4
Total votes		138,604	100.0
Republican gain from Democratic			

=== 2016 California State Assembly ===
California's 16th State Assembly district election, 2016
Primary election
Party	Candidate	Votes	%
Republican	Catharine Baker (incumbent)	71,906	53.2
Democratic	Cheryl Cook-Kallio	63,307	46.8
Total votes		135,213	100.0
General election
Republican	Catharine Baker (incumbent)	129,585	55.9
Democratic	Cheryl Cook-Kallio	102,290	44.1
Total votes		231,875	100.0
Republican hold			

=== 2018 California State Assembly ===
California's 16th State Assembly district election, 2018
Primary election
Party	Candidate	Votes	%
Republican	Catharine Baker (incumbent)	69,360	56.6
Democratic	Rebecca Bauer-Kahan	53,269	43.4
Total votes		122,629	100.0
General election
Democratic	Rebecca Bauer-Kahan	111,222	51.0
Republican	Catharine Baker (incumbent)	106,683	49.0
Total votes		217,905	100.0
Democratic gain from Republican			

== Awards ==
- 2017 NFWL Elected Women of Excellence award. Presented by National Foundation for Women Legislators (November 14, 2017).
- 2017 California School Boards Association (CSBA) Legislator of the Year.
- 2017 We The People Award. Presented by California Common Cause.
- California Distinguished Advocacy Award. Presented by American Cancer Society Cancer Action Network.
- Crime Victims United Legislator of the Year.
- March of Dimes Legislative Champion Award.

== Post-Assembly career ==
After leaving the California State Assembly, Baker has returned to private practice as an attorney, and is currently Special Counsel at Hoge Fenton Jones & Appel, advising businesses and non-profit organizations.

In August 2019, Baker joined the board of Livermore Lab Foundation, a nonprofit organization, and was named the President of Diablo Regional Arts Association.

In December 2020, State Controller Betty Yee appointed Baker to a seat on the five-member California Fair Political Practices Commission for a four-year term beginning in January 2021.

== Personal life ==
Baker's husband is Dan Baker. They have two children. Baker and her family live in Dublin, California.
