= Felicia Gressitt Bock =

American scholar (1916–2011)

- Felicia Gressitt (later Bock), from a 1936 photo in the files of Mount Holyoke College
- Born: Felicia Ray Gressitt; October 28, 1916; Tokyo, Japan
- Died: December 29, 2011 (age 95); Oakland, California, U.S.
- Occupations: Translator, scholar
- Notable work: annotated translation of the Engishiki (1970–1972)
- Children: 3, including Audie Bock
- Relatives: Judson Linsley Gressitt (brother), Earle Gorton Linsley (cousin)

Felicia Ray Gressitt Bock (October 28, 1916 – December 29, 2011) was an American scholar and translator of Japanese folklore and history. She helped launch the Japanese Historical Text Initiative at Berkeley, and is best known for her two-volume translation of the Engishiki, a civil code from Engi-era Japan.

== Early life and education ==
Gressitt was born in Tokyo, Japan, the daughter of James Fullerton Gressitt and Edna Eunice Linsley Gressitt. She was raised in Japan, where her parents were American Baptist missionaries. Her brother Judson Linsley Gressitt, her uncle Earle Garfield Linsley and her cousin Earle Gorton Linsley were all noted scientists.

Gressitt graduated from Mount Holyoke College in 1936 with an undergraduate honors thesis titled "The scientific knowledge of the Romans from the earliest times to the Augustan age". Later, she earned a master's degree and a Ph.D. in East Asian languages from the University of California, Berkeley. Her dissertation was titled ""Engi-shiki: Ceremonial Procedures of the Engi Era, 901-922" (1966).

== Career ==
Bock worked at the Library of Congress during World War II, and did translation work for the Office of Strategic Services (OSS). She taught a course in Japanese culture for the University of California Extension in the 1960s. Her collection of Japanese fans was exhibited in Alameda in 1975. She was active in the Seven College Council of the East Bay. She provided a grant to help launch the Japanese Historical Text Initiative at Berkeley, and endowed a professorship at Mount Holyoke College, known as the Felicia Gressitt Bock Chair in Asian Studies. In 2003, she gave an oral history interview to the League of Women Voters of Berkeley.

== Publications ==
- "Elements in the Development of Japanese Folk Song" (1948)
- "Japanese Children's Songs" (1949)
- "Songs of Japanese Workers" (1949)
- Engishiki: Procedures of the Engi era, Books I-X (2 vol., 1970 and 1972, translated by Bock)
- "The Rites of Renewal at Ise" (1974)
- "The Great Feast of the Enthronement" (1990)

== Personal life and legacy ==
Gressitt married Austrian-born accountant Charles Kurt Bock in Japan in 1940. They had children Audie, James, and Linsley, and lived in Berkeley, California. Her husband died in 2004, and she died in 2011, at the age of 95, in Oakland, California.
