= Hispanics and Latinos in San Diego =

Hispanic and Latino Americans make up 30.1% (pop. 400,337) of the population of San Diego, California, and 35.0% (pop. 1,145,183) of San Diego County, with the majority of Hispanics and Latinos in San Diego being Mexican American.

== Origin breakdown ==
Hispanic/Latino Origin/Ancestry	City of San Diego	County of San Diego
(Mexico) Mexican	331,283	984,171
(Puerto Rico) Puerto Rican	12,228	27,587
(Spain) Spanish	5,620	14,774
(El Salvador) Salvadoran	6,756	12,210
(Colombia) Colombian	8,119	11,945
(Peru) Peruvian	4,785	11,572
(Guatemala) Guatemalan	3,284	10,251
(Brazil) Brazilian	3,091 (2010)	
(Cuba) Cuban	2,860	7,581
(Honduras) Honduran	2,097	3,859
(Ecuador) Ecuadorian	1,158	3,665
(Dominican Republic) Dominican	1,233	4,518
(Chile) Chilean	1,544	2,361

== History ==
Hispanic and Latino presence in the San Diego region dates to the Spanish expedition led by Juan Rodríguez Cabrillo in 1542.

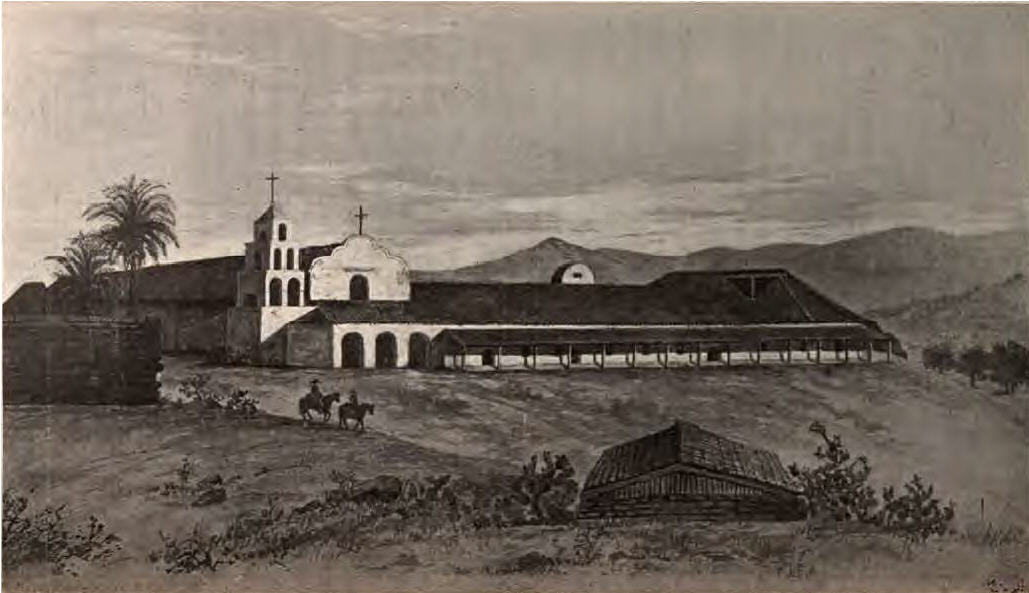
Mission San Diego de Alcala in 1848.

=== Spanish colonization ===
The Spanish established a presidio (fort) and Mission San Diego de Alcalá in 1769, marking the establishment of the first European settlement in the area. Over the following decades, more missions were established throughout California, including the nearby Mission San Luis Rey de Francia. During the Spanish colonial period, which lasted until 1821.

=== Mexican/Californio Rancho period ===
With Mexico's independence from Spain in 1821, San Diego became part of Mexican territory.During Mexican rule (1821–1848), the population included Mexican settlers and Californio families. The Californio rancheros, descendants of Spanish settlers, were involved in ranching, agriculture, and regional trade, contributing to the economic prosperity around the San Diego Bay. Prominent Californio families and individuals, such as the Estudillos and Peruvian-born Juan Bandini, were active in civic and economic life.

=== After the Mexican–American War ===
In 1848, the Treaty of Guadalupe Hidalgo ended the Mexican–American War, and San Diego, along with the rest of California, became part of the United States. Following the Treaty of Guadalupe Hidalgo (1848), California became part of the United States.

Although the treaty guaranteed certain property and citizenship rights, many Californios experienced political and economic decline. By 1860, most had left the area and the remainder were on the decline economically. Many Mexican Americans in San Diego left for Tijuana and other parts of Baja California. Historical accounts describe instances of discrimination and political marginalization.

As San Diego grew in the early 1900s, the region also attracted Portuguese immigrants, with many of them settling in the Roseville-Fleetridge neighborhood in Point Loma, San Diego, with many employed in the city's tuna industry. Some Korean Mexicans migrated north from the Yucatán through Baja California to Tijuana and eventually the San Diego region.

During World War II, many Hispanics in San Diego were employed in military installations, aircraft manufacturing, agriculture, and food processing industries, including tuna canneries.

During the 1960s and 1970s, local activists participated in the Chicano Movement, advocating for civil rights, educational reform, and community development. Activists and organizations, such as the Chicano Movement, fought for equal rights, educational opportunities, and improved living conditions.

Political representation among Latinos expanded in the late 20th century. Peter "Pete" Chacón became the first Latino elected to represent San Diego's 79th Assembly District in 1969, later serving until 1992 and playing a key role in bilingual education legislation. In 1996, Mary Salas was elected to the Chula Vista City Council, and in 2014 she became the city's first Latina mayor.

Beginning in the late 2010s, San Diego served as a reception point in the processing of migrant caravans composed largely of individuals from Honduras, Guatemala, and El Salvador. In November 2018, approximately 7,000 migrants arrived in Tijuana, many of whom sought entry through the San Ysidro Port of Entry. Local nonprofit and legal organizations coordinated assistance efforts, such as the San Diego Rapid Response Network and Border Angels provided legal assistance, temporary shelter, and logistical support as Customs and Border Protection released asylum seekers into the region. The situation placed strain on local service providers and led to increased collaboration among civic, legal, and nonprofit entities on both sides of the border.

The growth of Hispanic-serving community institutions provide demographic and socioeconomic data. For example, the 2023 State of San Diego Latinos Report highlighted that Latinos constitute roughly 35 % of the county population (over 1.14 million) but continue to face income and homeownership disparities, averaging $28,000 less in income and a 43 % homeownership rate versus 59 % among non-Latinos. To accompany the lesser homeownership rate, the average rent in Latino neighborhoods has skyrocketed in the past decade. Latinos have one of the highest rates for living in cost-burdened households, with ~44% of Hispanic-identifying residents being subject to it.

From 2024 to 2025, San Diego has seen a massive decline in immigration for the first time in over 10 years, with the immigrant numbers dropping over 11,000 from the year before. This is due in large part to the executive orders President Trump signed targeting migration at the border after his second inauguration in January 2025, as well as the growing unaffordability of the city.

Since early 2025, there has been a dramatic increase in the amount of targeted detentions of Latinos in San Diego. There have been over 4500 arrests made by federal immigration officers on the San Diego region's Hispanic population from May to October of 2025, with the rate of arrests per day outpacing the counties of Los Angeles, Orange, San Bernardino, Riverside, Ventura, Santa Barbara and San Luis Obispo combined all throughout September.

== Communities ==
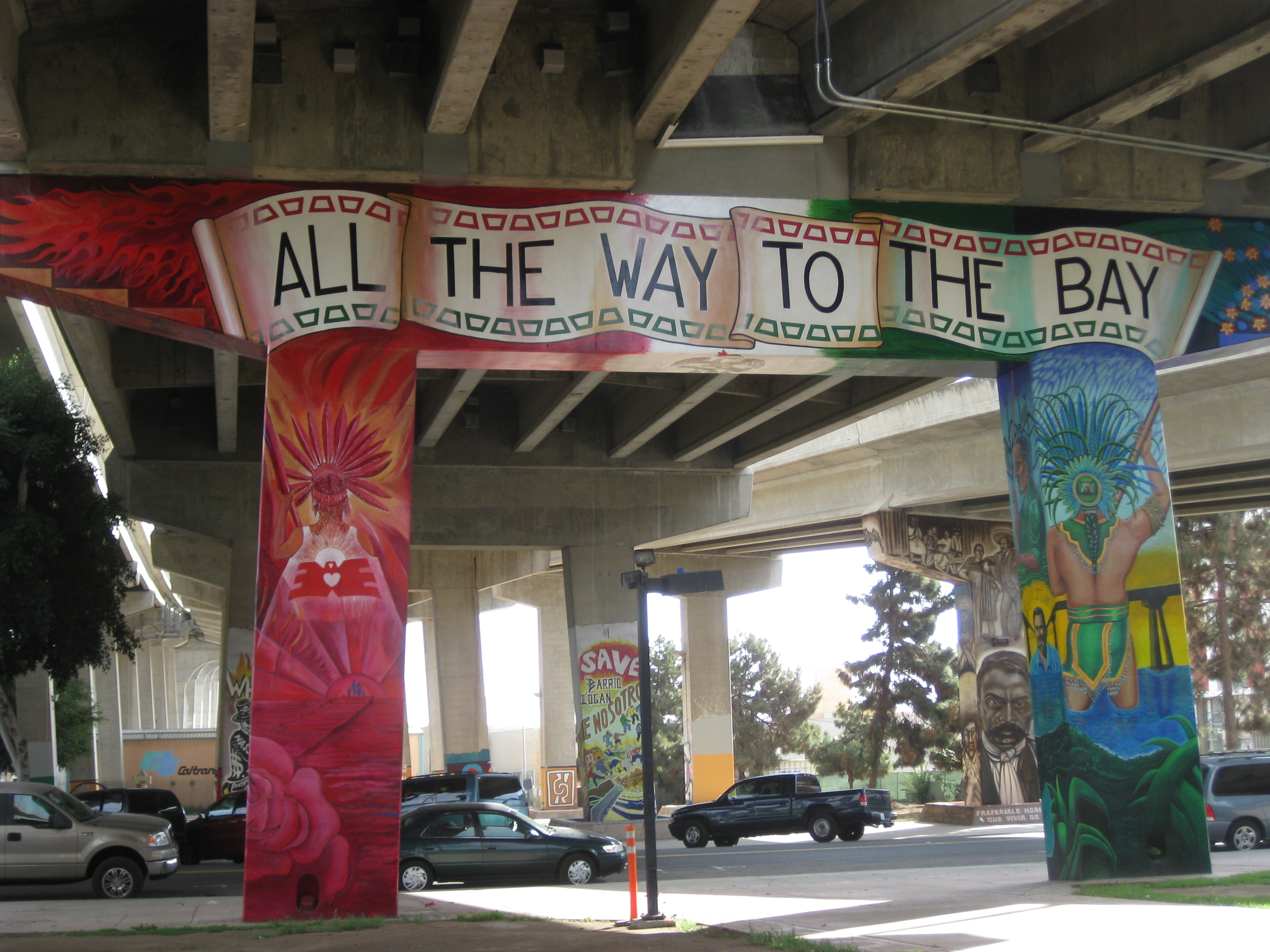
Chicano Park in Barrio Logan.

=== Barrio Logan ===
Barrio Logan, located in the southeastern part of downtown San Diego, is a historically significant neighborhood predominantly inhabited by Mexican Americans. The community has deep roots tracing back to the early 20th century when Mexican laborers settled in the area, working in the nearby shipyards and canneries.

Barrio Logan is associated with Chicano cultural activity. The neighborhood is home to numerous art galleries, studios, and mural-lined streets that showcase the creativity and activism of the local community. Chicano Park, established in 1970 beneath the San Diego-Coronado Bridge, contains numerous murals depicting Mexican and Chicano history. Since that year, Chicano Park has held an annual commemoration of its creation on April 22, which has come to be known as Chicano Park Day. The event draws thousands of participants and onlookers each year and has become a staple of Barrio Logan's spring.

=== Logan Heights ===
Logan Heights, located just east of downtown San Diego, has historically had a large Mexican American population. It was established in the late 19th century as a residential area for workers in the booming industries of the time.

The neighborhood has been the site of significant civil rights struggles and community activism. During the 1960s and 1970s, Logan Heights was at the forefront of the Chicano Movement, advocating for social justice, educational equity, and fair representation. During the 1960s and 1970s, residents organized against proposed urban renewal projects.

=== City Heights ===
City Heights, located in the eastern part of San Diego, is one of San Diego’s most demographically diverse neighborhoods. It has a significant population of immigrants from Central America, South America, and other Hispanic Caribbean countries. City Heights has received immigrants and refugees from Latin America and other regions.

=== San Ysidro ===
San Ysidro, located in the southernmost part of San Diego, on the Mexico–United States border, is a community with a significant Hispanic and Latino population. It serves as a gateway between the United States and Mexico, characterized by its cultural diversity and strong ties to Mexican heritage.

San Ysidro has a rich history shaped by its proximity to Mexico and its role as a busy land border crossing. The community embraces its cross-border connections, with many residents having familial and cultural ties on both sides of the border. San Ysidro’s population is predominantly Hispanic or Latino, with strong cross-border economic and familial ties to Tijuana.

== Culture ==
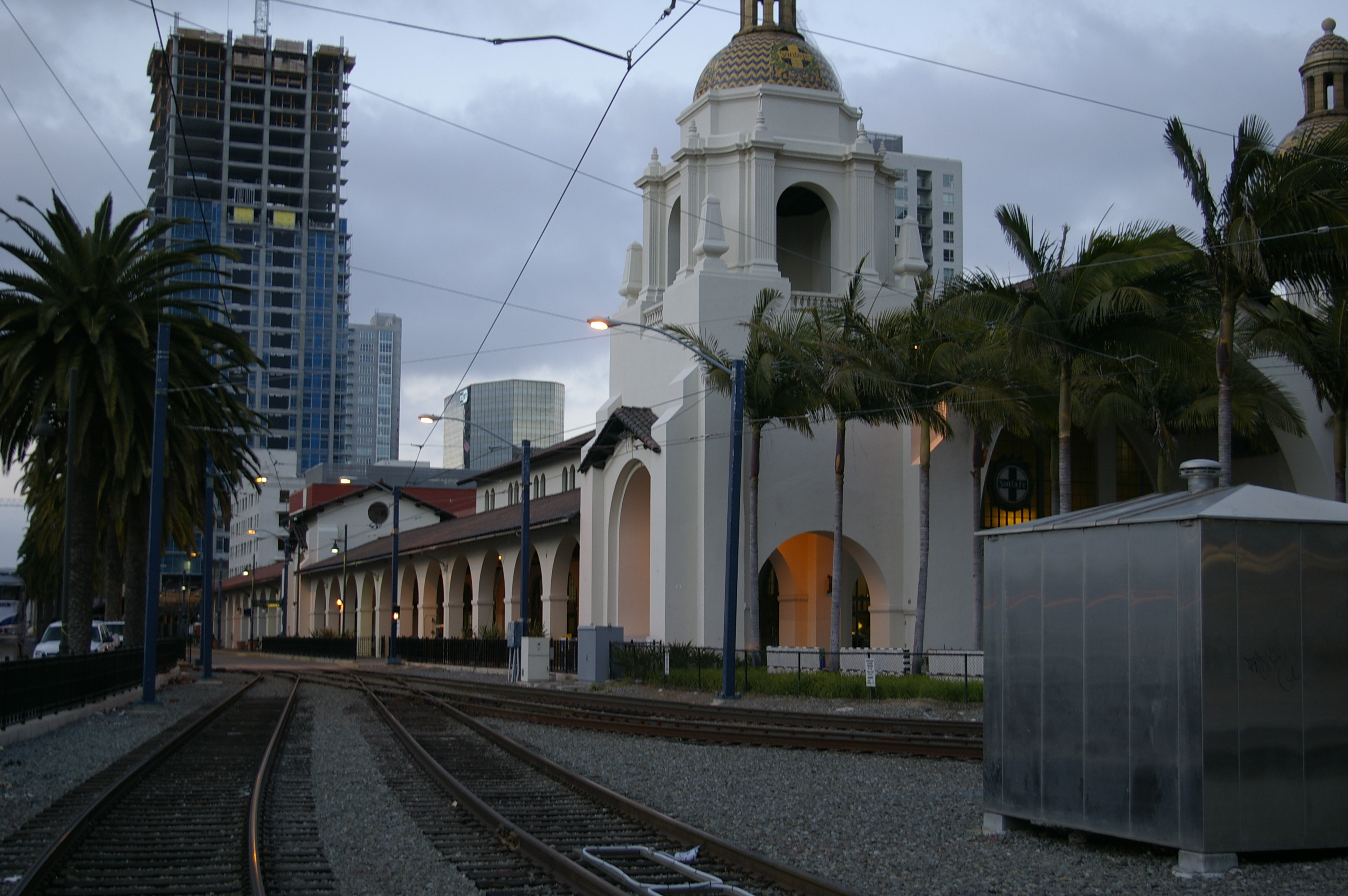
Mission Revival architecture of Santa Fe Depot.

Hispanic and Latino communities have influenced San Diego’s architecture, cuisine, and arts

=== Architecture ===
The Mission Revival architecture, prevalent in San Diego, is derived from Spanish colonial-era mission design. Inspired by the design of the California missions, this architectural style features elements such as red tile roofs, stucco walls, bell towers, and arched windows and doorways. Examples of Mission Revival architecture in San Diego include Santa Fe Depot and the Junípero Serra Museum, and can be found in the construction of schools, libraries, churches, and commercial structures.

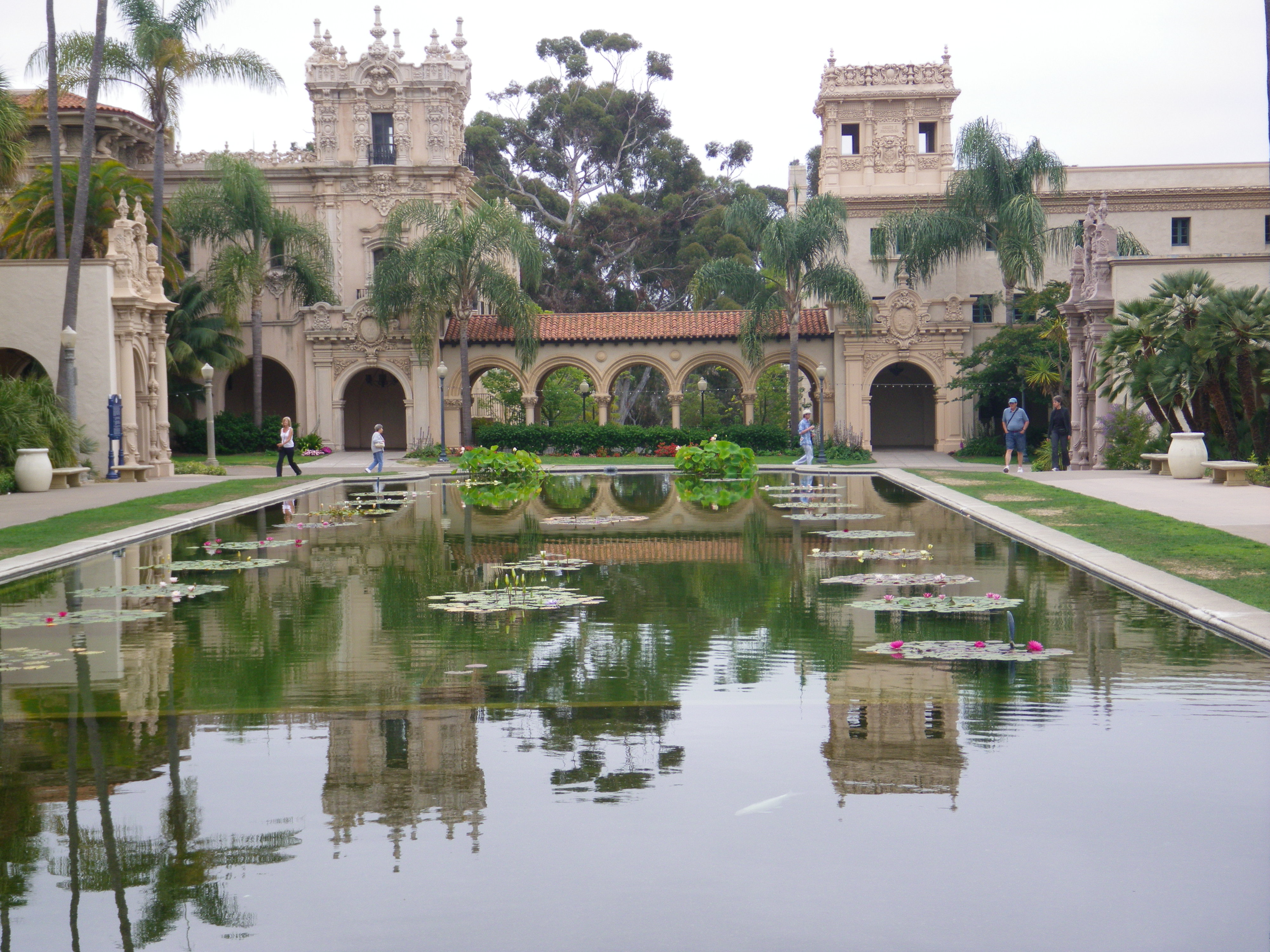
Spanish Colonial Revival architecture of Balboa Park.

Spanish Colonial Revival architecture, prevalent in the early 20th century, draws influence from the Spanish colonization period. Buildings designed in this style feature elements such as white stucco walls, wrought iron details, courtyards, and tilework. Balboa Park, home to numerous Spanish Colonial Revival buildings, including the California Building and the Museum of Us, contains numerous examples of this architectural style.

=== Cuisine ===
Several dishes associated with San Diego cuisine have Mexican and Baja California origins.

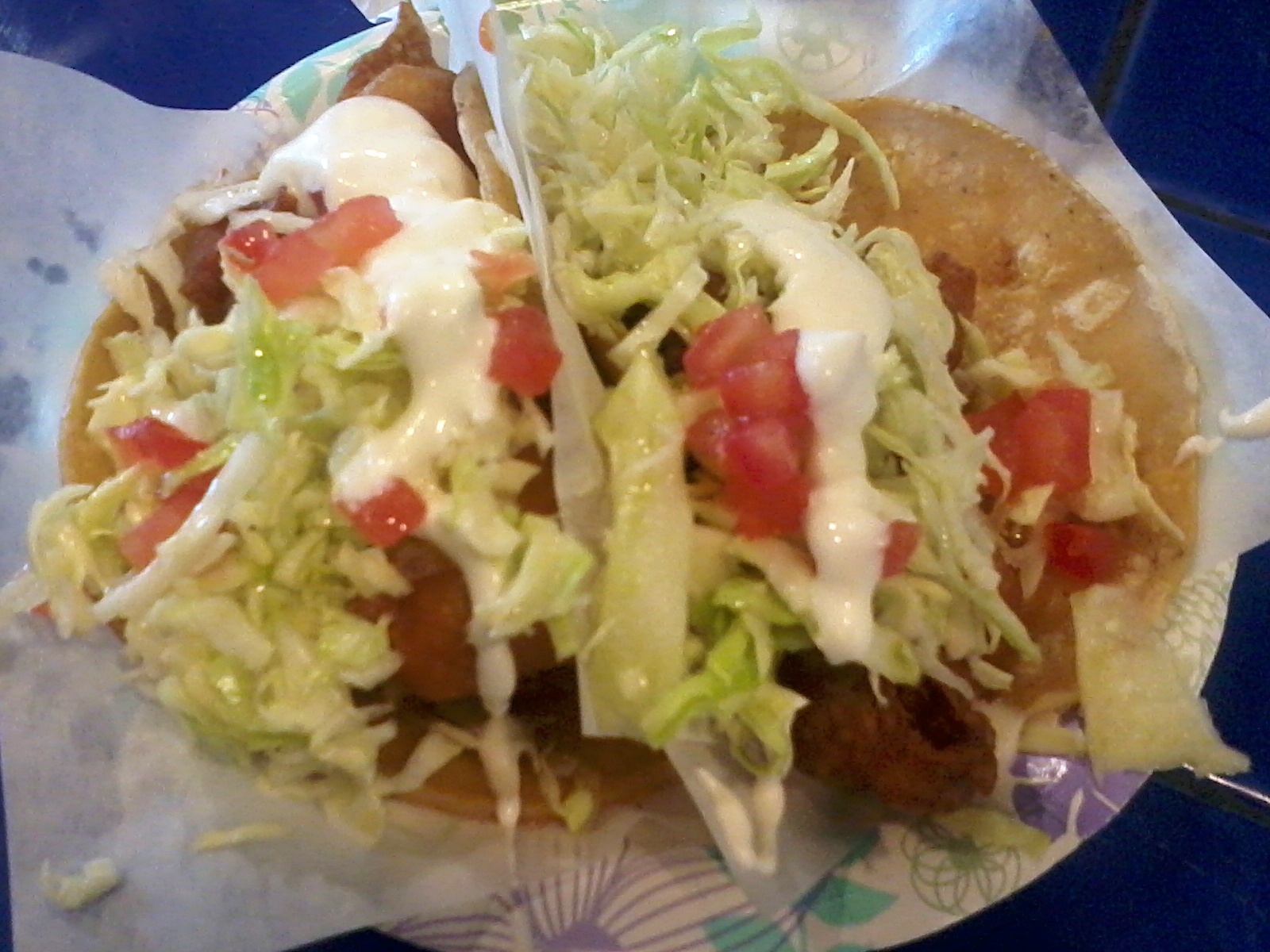
Fish Tacos

==== Fish tacos ====
Fish tacos originated from Baja California but was first popularized by the Rubio's fast-food chain in San Diego. “The dish typically consists of fresh fish, typically battered and fried, served in a soft tortilla with cabbage, salsa, and a squeeze of lime.

==== Carne asada fries ====
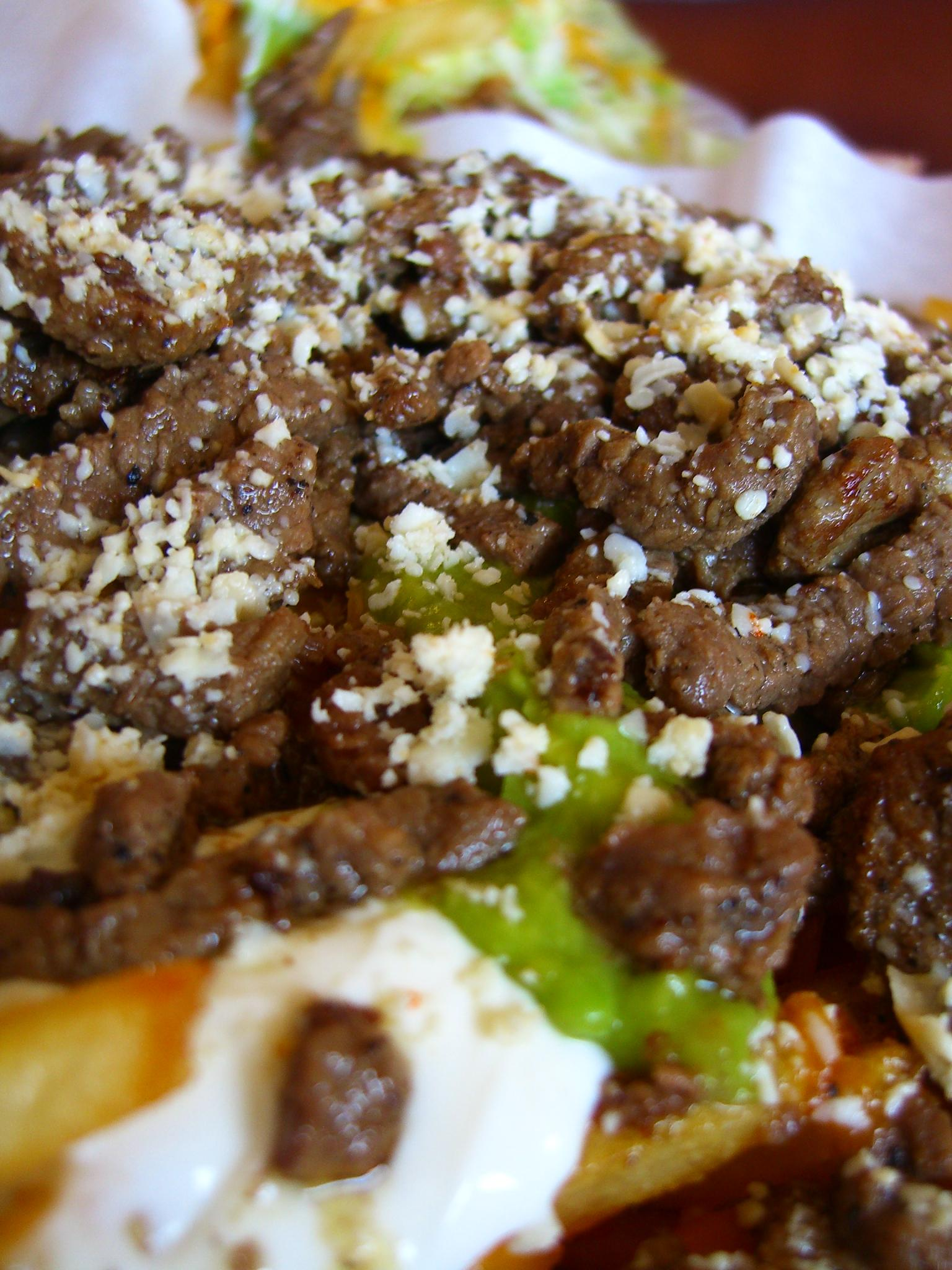
Carne Asada Fries from Lolita's Mexican Food.

Carne asada fries, a San Diego creation, are widely served in San Diego. While the exact origin of this dish is debated, Lolita's Mexican Food, a restaurant in San Diego, has claimed to have originated the dish in the late 1990s. Carne Asada Fries feature French fries topped with marinated and grilled carne asada, melted cheese, guacamole, sour cream, and salsa.

==== California burrito ====
The California burrito is commonly attributed to San Diego-area restaurants, though the inventor of the burrito remains unknown since it first popped up in Mexican restaurants across the city. It typically includes a flour tortilla filled with carne asada, French fries, cheese, sour cream, and salsa.

==== Surf and Turf burrito ====
The Surf and Turf burrito is a variation associated with San Diego, which typically includes carne asada, shrimp, rice, tomatoes, onions, green peppers, guacamole, and salsa. Some variations of the Surf and Turf burrito utilizes two flour tortillas and could weigh up to 3lbs.

A related variation is the Del Mar burrito, which includes shrimp, rice, lettuce, and pico de gallo.

==== Flautas (or rolled tacos) ====
Flautas, (or more widely known as rolled tacos or taquitos,) has been associated with San Diego restaurants since the 1940s, when Consolidated Aircraft factory workers asked tortilla factory owner Ralph Pesqueria Sr. to make portable lunch items in 1940. Based on his grandmother's recipe, he developed the "Taquito", and sold it to his customers, and eventually opened his own restaurant, El Indio Mexican Restaurant. The dish consists of small rolled-up tortillas that contain beef, chicken, or cheese as a filling.

==== Restaurant franchises ====
The city is also home to various food chains, such as Roberto's Taco Shop (founded in 1964) and Rubio's Coastal Grill (founded in 1963), which have expanded regionally and nationally.

=== Arts ===
Chicano Park, located beneath the San Diego–Coronado Bridge in Barrio Logan, contains numerous large-scale murals depicting Mexican and Chicano history. The park is adorned with murals that depict Mexican and Chicano history, culture, and struggles.

==== Balboa Park ====
The Spanish Village Art Center, situated in Balboa Park, was designed to resemble a Spanish village. The center features studios, galleries, and shops which includes artist studios and galleries.

Centro Cultural de la Raza, located in Balboa Park, is a cultural center is a cultural institution focused on Mexican, Chicano, and Indigenous arts. It hosts exhibitions, performances, workshops, and community events related to Mexican and Chicano culture.

==== Film ====
The San Diego Latino Film Festival began in 1993 and showcases Latino and Latin American films.

== Notable San Diegans of Hispanic or Latino origin ==
- Juan Bandini, Peruvian-Californio ranchero and politician
- Ricardo Breceda, Mexican-American sculptor
- Dominick Cruz, mixed martial artist, former UFC bantamweight champion of Mexican descent
- Luca de la Torre, Spanish-American professional soccer player
- Cameron Diaz, actress (My Best Friend's Wedding, Charlie's Angels)
- José Guadalupe Estudillo, Californio California state treasurer
- Gabriel Iglesias, Mexican-American stand-up comedian
- Father Luís Jayme, Spanish-born Roman Catholic priest, California's first Catholic martyr
- Mario López, Mexican-American actor and television personality (Saved by the Bell, Extra!) from Chula Vista
- Dominik Mysterio, professional wrestler, son of Rey Mysterio father son tag team champions
- El Hijo de Rey Misterio, professional wrestler
- Rey Mysterio, professional wrestler, WWE Grand Slam Champion first ever father son tag team champions
- Ellen Ochoa, Mexican-American NASA astronaut
- Sara Ramirez, Mexican American Tony-winning actress and singer
- Lil Rob, Chicano rapper from Solana Beach
- Jessica Sanchez, Mexican-American American Idol contestant
- Roberto Tapia, Mexican-American musician
- Victor Villaseñor, Mexican-American author from Carlsbad
