= Deborah Wright =

American banker (born 1958)

Debbie Wright
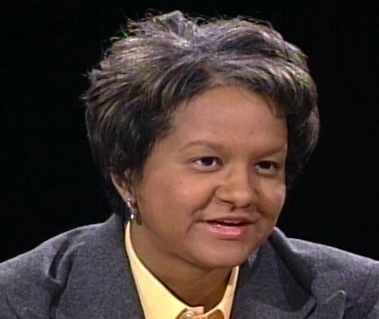
- Wright on CUNY TV's Urban Agenda (1996)
- Born: 1958 (age 67–68); Bennettsville, South Carolina, U.S.
- Education: Harvard University (BA, JD, MBA)

Deborah C. Wright (born 1958) is a board member of Citigroup Inc. (Audit, Consumer Compliance and Ethics and Culture Committees), Time Warner, Inc. (Audit Committee Chair) and Voya Financial (Finance Committee Chair). She is a member of the Board of Memorial Sloan-Kettering Cancer Center (Executive Committee and Audit Chair).

== Career ==
Wright was a senior fellow in the Economic Opportunity and Assets Division of the Ford Foundation from January 2015 through June 2016. Established in 1936, the foundation is an independent, global organization.

Wright was previously non-executive chairman of the board of Carver Bancorp, Inc. (NASDAQ - CARV) from January 2014 until December 2016, where she served as chairman and CEO from February 2005 to December 2014 and president and CEO from June 1, 1999. Carver Bancorp, Inc. is the holding company for Carver Federal Savings Bank, a federally chartered savings bank, and the nation's largest publicly traded African- and Caribbean- American operated bank, with approximately $700 million in assets and branches serving inner city neighborhoods in Harlem, Brooklyn and Queens. Black Enterprise Magazine named Carver "Financial Services Company of the Year" in 2006. The American Banker named Wright "Community Banker of the Year" in December 2003 and U.S. Banker named Wright one of the 25 Most Powerful Women in Banking in October 2010.

She was president and CEO of the Upper Manhattan Empowerment Zone from 1996 to 1999 and led development and execution of an investment strategy to expand Harlem's economy, by investing a $250 million capital budget, funded by the public sector, to expand local businesses and cultural institutions.

Wright was appointed Commissioner of The Department of Housing Preservation and Development in 1994 by Mayor Rudolph Giuliani, where she implemented an unprecedented privatization of residential buildings owned and managed by the City of New York. Mayor David N. Dinkins previously appointed her to the board of the New York City Housing Authority and the New York City Planning Commission. Wright began her professional career at the First Boston Corporation and the Partnership for New York City.

She previously served on the Harvard University Board of Overseers, the board of The Children's Defense Fund and Kraft Foods Inc. She was a founding boardmember of the Lower Manhattan Development Corporation, charged with rebuilding lower Manhattan in the aftermath of the September 11, 2001 terrorist attack.

Wright earned A.B., J.D. and M.B.A. degrees from Harvard University. She was raised in Bennettsville, South Carolina and Dallas, Texas.
