= California State Legislature, 1995–1996 session =

1995–96 session of the California State Legislature
←	1993–1994	1997–1998	→
- The Seal of California

Overview
- Legislative body: California State Legislature
- Jurisdiction: California
- Term: December 5, 1994 – November 30, 1996

Senate
- Members: 40
- President of the Senate: Leo T. McCarthy (D) Dec. 5, 1994 – Jan. 2, 1995; Gray Davis (D) Jan. 2, 1995 – Nov. 30, 1996
- President pro tempore: Bill Lockyer (D–10th); Dec. 5, 1995 – Nov. 30, 1996
- Minority Leader: Kenneth L. Maddy (R–14th) Dec. 5, 1995 – Aug. 24, 1995; Rob Hurtt (R–34th) Aug. 24, 1995 – Nov. 30, 1996
- Party control: Democratic

Assembly
- Members: 80
- Speaker: Willie Brown (D–13th) Jan. 24, 1995 – Jun. 5, 1995; Doris Allen (R–67th) Jun. 5, 1995 – Sep. 14, 1995; Brian Setencich (R–30th) Sep. 14, 1995 – Jan. 4, 1996; Curt Pringle (R–68th) Jan. 4, 1996 – Nov. 30, 1996
- Minority Leader: Jim Brulte (R–63rd) Dec. 5, 1994 – Aug. 18, 1995; Curt Pringle (R–68th) Aug. 21, 1995 – Jan. 4, 1996; Richard Katz (D–39th) Jan. 4, 1996 – Nov. 30, 1996
- Party control: Republican

The 1995–96 session was a former session of the California State Legislature. The session first convened on December 5, 1994 and adjourned sine die on November 30, 1996.

== Major events ==
=== Vacancies and special elections ===
- July 8, 1994: Republican state senator Frank Hill (29th–Whittier) resigned after being convicted of extortion, money laundering, and conspiracy in a corruption scandal.
- January 2, 1995: Republican state senator Marian Bergeson (35th–Newport Beach) resigned after being elected to the Orange County Board of Supervisors.
- January 23, 1995: Republican assemblyman Dick Mountjoy (59th–Arcadia) is expelled from the State Assembly. Mountjoy had been simultaneously elected in the November elections to the state assembly and the state senate, the latter in a special election for the 29th State Senate district to replace Hill. Mountjoy was first sworn into the Assembly in December intending to elect a Republican speaker, but was expelled for attempting to hold both offices. He was sworn into the State Senate on January 24.
- May 11, 1995: Republican assemblyman Ross Johnson (72nd–Placentia) is sworn into office after winning the May 9 special election for the 35th State Senate district to replace Bergeson. Earlier, he had moved his residence to Irvine to run in the district.
- May 18, 1995: Republican Gary Miller of Diamond Bar is sworn into office after Independent Paul Horcher (60th–Diamond Bar) was recalled on May 16.
- June 7, 1995: Republican Bob Margett of Arcadia is sworn into office after winning the June 6 special election for the 59th State Assembly district to replace Mountjoy.
- August 22, 1995: A recall election against Democratic assemblyman Michael Machado (17th–Linden) failed, and Machado remained in office.
- September 13, 1995: Republican Dick Ackerman of Fullerton is sworn into office after winning the September 12 special election for the 72nd State Assembly district to replace Johnson.
- November 29, 1995: Republican Scott Baugh of Huntington Beach is sworn into office after Republican Doris Allen (67th–Cypress) was recalled on November 28.
- December 14, 1995: Republican state senator Tom Campbell (11th–Campbell) and Democratic assemblyman Willie Brown (13th–San Francisco) resigned. Campbell was elected to the United States House of Representatives in a December 12 special election for California's 15th congressional district, while Brown was elected to become Mayor of San Francisco.
- March 28, 1996: Democratic assemblyman Byron Sher (21st–Palo Alto) is sworn into office after winning the March 26 special election for the 11th State Senate district to replace Campbell. Democrat Carole Migden of San Francisco is sworn into office after winning the March 26 special election for the 13th State Assembly district to replace Brown.
- April 15, 1996: Democratic assemblywoman Juanita Millender-McDonald (55th–Carson) resigned after being elected to the United States House of Representatives in a March 26 special election for California's 37th congressional district.

=== Leadership changes ===
- December 5, 1994 – January 23, 1995: The Assembly had no speaker after the chamber deadlocked on a 40–40 vote between Democrat Willie Brown (13th–San Francisco) and Republican Jim Brulte (63rd–Rancho Cucamonga), with Paul Horcher (60th–Diamond Bar) voting with the Democrats. On January 24, Brown was elected speaker on a 40–39 vote after expelling Dick Mountjoy (see above).
- January 2, 1995: Democrat Gray Davis is sworn in as Lieutenant Governor (who is also President of the State Senate) to succeed fellow Democrat Leo T. McCarthy.
- June 5, 1995: Republican assemblywoman Doris Allen (67th–Cypress) is elected speaker with the support of Democrats to succeed Brown. Brown remained Democratic leader in the State Assembly.
- August 21, 1995: Assemblyman Curt Pringle (68th–Garden Grove) is elected Republican leader after Jim Brulte (63rd–Rancho Cucamonga) resigned the position on August 18.
- August 24, 1995: Republican state senator Kenneth L. Maddy (14th–Fresno) is ousted from the position of Republican state senate leader by Rob Hurtt (34th–Garden Grove).
- September 14, 1995: Republican assemblyman Brian Setencich (30th–Fresno) is elected speaker with the support of Democrats and Allen to succeed Allen.
- December 18, 1995: Assemblyman Richard Katz (39th–Sylmar) is elected Democratic leader after Willie Brown (13th–San Francisco) resigned from the State Assembly.
- January 4, 1996: Republican assemblyman Brian Setencich (30th–Fresno) is ousted from the speakership by fellow Republican Curt Pringle (68th–Garden Grove).

=== Party changes ===
- December 5, 1994: Assemblyman Paul Horcher (60th–Diamond Bar) leaves the Republican Party to become an Independent on the first day of the legislative session.
- December 5, 1995: Assemblyman Dominic L. Cortese (23rd–San Jose) leaves the Democratic Party for the Reform Party.

== Senate ==
Affiliation	Party (Shading indicates majority caucus)			Total	
Affiliation	Democratic	Independent	Republican	Total	Vacant
End of previous legislature	23	2	14	39	1
Begin	21	2	16	39	1
January 2, 1995	21	2	15	38	2
January 24, 1995	21	2	16	39	1
May 11, 1995	21	2	17	40	0
December 14, 1995	21	2	16	39	1
March 28, 1996	22	2	16	40	0
Latest voting share	55%	5%	40%		

=== Officers ===
Position	Name	Party	District	Notes
Lieutenant Governor	Leo T. McCarthy	Democratic		Until January 2, 1995
Lieutenant Governor	Gray Davis	Democratic		From January 2, 1995 onward
President pro tempore	Bill Lockyer	Democratic	10th–Hayward	
Minority leader	Kenneth L. Maddy	Republican	14th–Fresno	Until August 24, 1995
Minority leader	Rob Hurtt	Republican	34th–Garden Grove	From August 24, 1995 onward

=== Members ===
District	Name	Party	Residence	Term-limited?	Notes
1	Tim Leslie	Republican	Tahoe City		
2	Mike Thompson	Democratic	St. Helena		
3	Milton Marks	Democratic	San Francisco		
4	Maurice Johannessen	Republican	Redding		
5	Patrick Johnston	Democratic	Stockton		
6	Leroy F. Greene	Democratic	Carmichael		
7	Daniel Boatwright	Democratic	Concord	Yes	
8	Quentin L. Kopp	Independent	San Francisco		
9	Nicholas C. Petris	Democratic	Oakland	Yes	
10	Bill Lockyer	Democratic	Hayward		
11	Tom Campbell	Republican	Campbell		Resigned on December 14, 1995
11	Vacant from December 14, 1995, to March 28, 1996				
11	Byron Sher	Democratic	Palo Alto		Took office on March 28, 1996
12	Dick Monteith	Republican	Modesto		
13	Al Alquist	Democratic	San Jose	Yes	
14	Kenneth L. Maddy	Republican	Fresno		
15	Henry J. Mello	Democratic	Watsonville	Yes	
16	Jim Costa	Democratic	Fresno		
17	Don Rogers	Republican	Tehachapi	Yes	
18	Jack O'Connell	Democratic	Carpinteria		
19	Cathie Wright	Republican	Simi Valley		
20	Herschel Rosenthal	Democratic	Los Angeles		
21	Newton Russell	Republican	Glendale		
22	Richard Polanco	Democratic	Los Angeles		
23	Tom Hayden	Democratic	Los Angeles		
24	Hilda Solis	Democratic	El Monte		
25	Teresa Hughes	Democratic	Inglewood		
26	Diane Watson	Democratic	Los Angeles		
27	Robert G. Beverly	Republican	Long Beach	Yes	
28	Ralph Dills	Democratic	Gardena		
29	Vacant from July 8, 1994, to January 24, 1995				
29	Dick Mountjoy	Republican	Arcadia		Took office on January 24, 1995
30	Charles Calderon	Democratic	Whittier		
31	Bill Leonard	Republican	San Bernardino	Yes	
32	Ruben S. Ayala	Democratic	Chino		
33	John Lewis	Republican	Orange		
34	Rob Hurtt	Republican	Garden Grove		
35	Marian Bergeson	Republican	Newport Beach	Yes	Resigned on January 2, 1995
35	Vacant from January 2, 1995, to May 11, 1995				
35	Ross Johnson	Republican	Irvine		Took office on May 11, 1995
36	Ray Haynes	Republican	Riverside		
37	David G. Kelley	Republican	Idyllwild		
38	William A. Craven	Republican	Oceanside		
39	Lucy Killea	Independent	San Diego	Yes	
40	Steve Peace	Democratic	Chula Vista		

== Assembly ==
Affiliation	Party (Shading indicates majority caucus)					Total	
Affiliation	Reform	Independent	Democratic	Republican		Total	Vacant
End of previous legislature	0	0	47	33		80	0
Begin	0	0	39	41		80	0
December 5, 1995	0	1	39	40		80	0
January 23, 1995	0	1	39	39		79	1
May 11, 1995	0	1	39	38		78	2
May 18, 1995	0	0	39	39		78	2
June 5, 1995	0	0	39	1	38	78	2
June 7, 1995	0	0	39	1	39	79	1
September 13, 1995	0	0	39	1	40	80	0
September 14, 1995	0	0	39	2	39	80	0
November 29, 1995	0	0	39	1	40	80	0
December 5, 1995	1	0	38	1	40	80	0
December 14, 1995	1	0	37	1	40	79	1
January 4, 1996	1	0	37	1	40	79	1
March 28, 1996	1	0	37	1	40	79	1
April 15, 1996	1	0	36	1	40	78	2
Latest voting share	1.3%	0%	46.2%	1.3%	51.3%		

=== Officers ===
Position	Name	Party	District	Notes
Speaker	Willie Brown	Democratic	13th–San Francisco	From January 24, 1995 until June 5, 1995
Speaker	Doris Allen	Republican	67th–Cypress	From June 5, 1995, to September 14, 1995
Speaker	Brian Setencich	Republican	30th–Fresno	From September 14, 1995, to January 4, 1996
Speaker	Curt Pringle	Republican	68th–Garden Grove	From January 4, 1996 onward
Minority leader	Jim Brulte	Republican	63rd–Rancho Cucamonga	Until June 5, 1995
Minority leader	Willie Brown	Democratic	13th–San Francisco	From June 5, 1995, to September 14, 1995
Minority leader	Richard Katz	Democratic	39th–Sylmar	From September 14, 1995 onward

=== Members ===
District	Name	Party	Residence	Term-limited?	Notes
1	Dan Hauser	Democratic	Arcata	Yes	
2	Tom Woods	Republican	Shasta		
3	Bernie Richter	Republican	Chico		
4	David Knowles	Republican	Cameron Park	Yes	
5	Barbara Alby	Republican	Fair Oaks		
6	Kerry Mazzoni	Democratic	Novato		
7	Valerie K. Brown	Democratic	Sonoma		
8	Tom Hannigan	Democratic	Fairfield	Yes	
9	Phillip Isenberg	Democratic	Sacramento	Yes	
10	Larry Bowler	Republican	Elk Grove		
11	Robert Campbell	Democratic	Richmond	Yes	
12	John L. Burton	Democratic	San Francisco	Yes	
13	Willie Brown	Democratic	San Francisco	Yes	Resigned on December 14, 1995
13	Vacant from December 14, 1995, to March 28, 1996				
13	Carole Migden	Democratic	San Francisco		Sworn into office on March 28, 1996
14	Tom Bates	Democratic	Berkeley	Yes	
15	Richard Rainey	Republican	Walnut Creek		
16	Barbara Lee	Democratic	Oakland	Yes	
17	Michael Machado	Democratic	Linden		
18	Michael Sweeney	Democratic	Hayward		
19	Jackie Speier	Democratic	Hillsborough	Yes	
20	Liz Figueroa	Democratic	Fremont		
21	Byron Sher	Democratic	Palo Alto	Yes	Resigned on March 28, 1996
21	Vacant from March 28, 1996, onward				
22	John Vasconcellos	Democratic	Santa Clara	Yes	
23	Dominic L. Cortese	Democratic	San Jose	Yes	Changed parties on December 5, 1995
23	Dominic L. Cortese	Reform	San Jose	Yes	Changed parties on December 5, 1995
24	Jim Cunneen	Republican	San Jose		
25	George House	Republican	Hughson		
26	Sal Cannella	Democratic	Ceres	Yes	
27	Bruce McPherson	Republican	Santa Cruz		
28	Peter Frusetta	Republican	Tres Pinos		
29	Chuck Poochigian	Republican	Fresno		
30	Brian Setencich	Republican	Fresno		
31	Cruz Bustamante	Democratic	Fresno		
32	Trice Harvey	Republican	Bakersfield	Yes	
33	Tom J. Bordonaro, Jr.	Republican	Paso Robles		
34	Keith Olberg	Republican	Victorville		
36	William J. Knight	Republican	Palmdale		
37	Nao Takasugi	Republican	Oxnard		
38	Paula Boland	Republican	Granada Hills	Yes	
39	Richard Katz	Democratic	Sylmar	Yes	
40	Barbara Friedman	Democratic	Los Angeles	Yes	
41	Sheila Kuehl	Democratic	Santa Monica		
42	Wally Knox	Democratic	Los Angeles		
43	James E. Rogan	Republican	Glendale		
44	Bill Hoge	Republican	Pasadena		
45	Antonio Villaraigosa	Democratic	Los Angeles		
42	Louis Caldera	Democratic	Los Angeles		
47	Kevin Murray	Democratic	Los Angeles		
48	Marguerite Archie-Hudson	Democratic	Los Angeles	Yes	
49	Diane Martinez	Democratic	Monterey Park		
50	Martha Escutia	Democratic	Huntington Park		
51	Curtis R. Tucker, Jr.	Democratic	Inglewood	Yes	
52	Willard H. Murray, Jr.	Democratic	Paramount	Yes	
53	Debra Bowen	Democratic	Marina del Rey		
54	Steven T. Kuykendall	Republican	Rancho Palos Verdes		
55	Juanita Millender-McDonald	Democratic	Carson		Resigned on April 15, 1996
55	Vacant from April 15, 1996 onward				
56	Phil Hawkins	Republican	Bellflower		
57	Martin Gallegos	Democratic	Baldwin Park		
58	Grace Napolitano	Democratic	Norwalk	Yes	
59	Dick Mountjoy	Republican	Arcadia	Yes	Expelled on January 23, 1995
59	Vacant from January 23, 1995, to June 7, 1995				
59	Bob Margett	Republican	Arcadia		Sworn into office on June 7, 1995
60	Paul Horcher	Republican	Diamond Bar	Yes	Changed parties on December 5, 1994. Recalled on May 16, 1995.
60	Paul Horcher	Independent	Diamond Bar	Yes	Changed parties on December 5, 1994. Recalled on May 16, 1995.
60	Gary Miller	Republican	Diamond Bar		Sworn into office on May 18, 1995
61	Fred Aguiar	Republican	Chino		
62	Joe Baca	Democratic	Rialto		
63	Jim Brulte	Republican	Rancho Cucamonga	Yes	
64	Ted Weggeland	Republican	Riverside		
65	Brett Granlund	Republican	Yucaipa		
66	Bruce Thompson	Republican	Fallbrook		
67	Doris Allen	Republican	Cypress	Yes	Recalled on November 28, 1995
67	Scott Baugh	Republican	Huntington Beach		Sworn into office on November 29, 1995
68	Curt Pringle	Republican	Garden Grove		
69	Jim Morrissey	Republican	Santa Ana		
70	Marilyn Brewer	Republican	Newport Beach		
71	Mickey Conroy	Republican	Orange	Yes	
72	Ross Johnson	Republican	Placentia	Yes	Resigned on May 11, 1995
72	Vacant from May 11, 1995, to September 13, 1995				
72	Dick Ackerman	Republican	Fullerton		Sworn into office on September 13, 1995
73	Bill Morrow	Republican	Oceanside		
74	Howard Kaloogian	Republican	Carlsbad		
75	Jan Goldsmith	Republican	Poway		
76	Susan Davis	Democratic	San Diego		
77	Steve Baldwin	Republican	El Cajon		
78	Dede Alpert	Democratic	Coronado		
79	Denise Moreno Ducheny	Democratic	San Diego		
80	Jim Battin	Republican	La Quinta		

== See also ==
- List of California state legislatures
