= California State Legislature, 2013–2014 session =

2013–14 session of the California State Legislature
←	2011–2012	2015–2016	→
- The Seal of California

Overview
- Legislative body: California State Legislature
- Jurisdiction: California
- Term: December 3, 2012 – November 30, 2014

Senate
- Members: 40
- President of the Senate: Gavin Newsom (D); Dec. 3, 2012 – Nov. 30, 2014
- President pro tempore: Darrell Steinberg (D–6th) Dec. 3, 2012 – Oct. 15, 2014; Kevin de León (D–22nd) Oct. 15, 2014 – Nov. 30, 2014
- Minority Leader: Bob Huff (R–29th); Dec. 3, 2012 – Nov. 30, 2014
- Party control: Democratic

Assembly
- Members: 80
- Speaker: John Pérez (D–53rd) Dec. 3, 2012 – May 12, 2014; Toni Atkins (D–78th) May 12, 2014 – Nov. 30, 2014
- Minority Leader: Connie Conway (R–26th) Dec. 3, 2012 – Nov. 6, 2014; Kristin Olsen (R–12th) Nov. 6, 2014 – Nov. 30, 2014
- Party control: Democratic

The 2013–14 session was a session of the California State Legislature. The session first convened on December 3, 2012, and adjourned sine die on November 30, 2014.

== Major events ==
=== Vacancies and special elections ===
- August 31, 2012: Republican state senator Doug LaMalfa (4th–Richvale) resigned to run for Congress.
- January 2, 2013: Democratic state senators Gloria Negrete McLeod (32nd–Chino) and Juan Vargas (40th–San Diego) resigned to take their seats in Congress.
- January 10, 2013: Former Republican assemblyman Jim Nielsen of Gerber is sworn into office after winning the January 8 special election for the 4th State Senate district to replace LaMalfa.
- February 22, 2013: Democratic state senator Michael Rubio (32nd–Shafter) resigned to become government relations manager for Chevron Corporation.
- March 21, 2013: Democratic assemblyman Ben Hueso (80th–San Diego) is sworn into office after winning the March 12 special election for the 40th State Senate district to replace Vargas.
- May 20, 2013: Democratic assemblywoman Norma Torres (52nd–Pomona) is sworn into office after winning the May 14 special election for the 32nd State Senate district to replace Negrete McLeod.
- May 28, 2013: Democrat Lorena Gonzalez of San Diego is sworn into office after winning the May 21 special election for the 80th State Assembly district to replace Hueso.
- June 30, 2013: Democratic state senator Curren Price (26th–Los Angeles) and Democratic assemblyman Bob Blumenfield (45th–Woodland Hills) resigned to take up their seats on the Los Angeles City Council.
- August 10, 2013: Republican Andy Vidak of Hanford is sworn into office after winning the July 23 special election for the 16th State Senate district to replace Rubio.
- September 26, 2013: Democratic assemblywoman Holly Mitchell (54th–Los Angeles) is sworn into office after winning the September 17 special election for the 26th State Senate district to replace Price.
- October 11, 2013: Democrat Freddie Rodriguez of Pomona is sworn into office after winning the September 24 special election for the 52nd State Assembly district to replace Torres.
- December 1, 2013: Republican state senator Bill Emmerson (23rd–Hemet) resigned for personal reasons.
- December 5, 2013: Democrat Sebastian Ridley-Thomas of Los Angeles is sworn into office after winning the December 3 special election for the 54th State Assembly district to replace Mitchell.
- January 6, 2014: Democrat Matt Dababneh of Encino is sworn into office after winning the November 19 special election for the 45th State Assembly district to replace Blumenfield.
- March 28, 2014: Democratic state senators Ron Calderon (30th–Montebello), Rod Wright (35th–Inglewood), and Leland Yee (8th–San Francisco) are suspended from service.
- April 3, 2014: Republican assemblyman Mike Morrell (40th–Rancho Cucamonga) is sworn into office after winning the March 25 special election for the 23rd State Senate district to replace Emmerson.
- September 22, 2014: Democratic state senator Rod Wright (35th–Inglewood) resigned to serve a jail sentence after conviction for perjury and voter fraud.

=== Leadership changes ===
- May 12, 2014: Democratic assemblywoman Toni Atkins (78th–San Diego) replaces assemblyman John Pérez (53rd–Los Angeles) as Speaker of the Assembly, as Pérez is termed out at the end of the session.
- October 15, 2014: Democratic state senator Kevin de León (22nd–Los Angeles) replaces state senator Darrell Steinberg (6th–Sacramento) as President pro tempore of the State Senate, as Steinberg is termed out at the end of the session.

== Senate ==
Composition of the California State Senate Democratic Party Republican Party Suspended

↓
25	1	2	12
Democratic	Vacant	Suspended	Republican

Affiliation	Party (Shading indicates majority caucus)		Total		
Affiliation	Democratic	Republican	Total	Vacant	Suspended
End of previous legislature	25	14	39	1	0
Begin	29	10	39	1	0
January 2, 2013	27	10	37	3	0
January 10, 2013	27	11	38	2	0
February 22, 2013	26	11	37	3	0
March 21, 2013	27	11	38	2	0
May 20, 2013	28	11	39	1	0
July 1, 2013	27	11	38	2	0
August 10, 2013	27	12	39	1	0
September 26, 2013	28	12	40	0	0
December 1, 2013	28	11	39	1	0
March 28, 2014	25	11	36	1	3
April 4, 2014	25	12	37	0	3
September 22, 2014	25	12	37	1	2
Latest voting share	67.6%	32.4%			

=== Officers ===
Position	Name	Party	District
Lieutenant Governor	Gavin Newsom	Democratic	
President pro tempore	Kevin de León	Democratic	22nd–Los Angeles
Majority leader	Ellen Corbett	Democratic	10th–Hayward
Majority caucus chair	Jerry Hill	Democratic	13th–San Mateo
Minority leader	Bob Huff	Republican	29th–Diamond Bar
Minority caucus chair	Ted Gaines	Republican	1st–Rocklin
Secretary	Greg Schmidt		
Sergeant-at-Arms	Tony Beard, Jr.		
Chaplain	Rabbi Mona Alfi		

The Secretary, the Sergeant-at-Arms, and the Chaplain are not members of the Legislature.

=== Members ===
Note that odd-numbered districts are based on the new maps created in 2011 by the California Citizens Redistricting Commission, while even-numbered districts are based on the old maps created in 2001 by the state legislature. Odd districts can overlap with even districts or leave gaps.

District	Name	Party	Residence	Term-limited?	Notes
1	Ted Gaines	Republican	Rocklin		
2	Noreen Evans	Democratic	Santa Rosa		
3	Lois Wolk	Democratic	Davis		
4	Vacant from September 1, 2012, to January 10, 2013				
4	Jim Nielsen	Republican	Gerber		Sworn into office on January 10, 2013
5	Cathleen Galgiani	Democratic	Stockton		
6	Darrell Steinberg	Democratic	Sacramento	Yes	President pro tempore from December 2, 2012, to October 15, 2014
7	Mark DeSaulnier	Democratic	Concord		
8	Leland Yee	Democratic	San Francisco	Yes	Suspended on March 28, 2014
9	Loni Hancock	Democratic	Berkeley		
10	Ellen Corbett	Democratic	Hayward	Yes	
11	Mark Leno	Democratic	San Francisco		
12	Anthony Cannella	Republican	Ceres		
13	Jerry Hill	Democratic	San Mateo		
14	Tom Berryhill	Republican	Twain Harte		
15	Jim Beall	Democratic	San Jose		
16	Michael Rubio	Democratic	Shafter		Resigned on February 22, 2013
16	Vacant from February 22 to August 10				
16	Andy Vidak	Republican	Hanford		Sworn into office on August 10, 2013
17	Bill Monning	Democratic	Carmel		
18	Jean Fuller	Republican	Bakersfield		
19	Hannah-Beth Jackson	Democratic	Santa Barbara		
20	Alex Padilla	Democratic	Pacoima	Yes	
21	Steve Knight	Republican	Palmdale		
22	Kevin de León	Democratic	Los Angeles		President pro tempore since October 15, 2014
23	Bill Emmerson	Republican	Hemet		Resigned on December 1, 2013
23	Vacant from December 1, 2013, to April 4, 2014				
23	Mike Morrell	Republican	Rancho Cucamonga		Sworn into office on April 4
24	Edward Hernández	Democratic	West Covina		
25	Carol Liu	Democratic	La Cañada Flintridge		
26	Curren Price	Democratic	Los Angeles		Resigned on July 1, 2013
26	Vacant from July 1 to September 26				
26	Holly Mitchell	Democratic	Los Angeles		Sworn into office on September 26, 2013
27	Fran Pavley	Democratic	Agoura Hills		
28	Ted Lieu	Democratic	Torrance		
29	Bob Huff	Republican	Diamond Bar		Minority leader
30	Ronald Calderon	Democratic	Montebello	Yes	Suspended on March 28, 2014
31	Richard Roth	Democratic	Riverside		
32	Gloria Negrete McLeod	Democratic	Chino	Yes	Resigned on January 2, 2013
32	Vacant from January 2 to May 20				
32	Norma Torres	Democratic	Pomona		Sworn into office on May 20, 2013
33	Ricardo Lara	Democratic	Bell Gardens		
34	Lou Correa	Democratic	Santa Ana	Yes	
35	Rod Wright	Democratic	Inglewood		Suspended on March 28, 2014; Resigned on September 22, 2014
35	Vacant since September 22				
36	Joel Anderson	Republican	Alpine		
37	Mimi Walters	Republican	Irvine		
38	Mark Wyland	Republican	Escondido	Yes	
39	Marty Block	Democratic	San Diego		
40	Juan Vargas	Democratic	San Diego		Resigned on January 2, 2013
40	Vacant from January 2 to March 21				
40	Ben Hueso	Democratic	San Diego		Sworn into office on March 21, 2013

== Assembly ==
Composition of the California State Assembly Democratic Party Republican Party Vacant

↓
55	1	24
Democratic	V	Republican

Affiliation	Party (Shading indicates majority caucus)			Total	
Affiliation	Democratic	Independent	Republican	Total	Vacant
End of previous legislature	52	1	27	80	0
Begin	55	0	25	80	0
March 21, 2013	54	0	25	79	1
May 16, 2013	53	0	25	78	2
May 28, 2013	54	0	25	79	1
July 1, 2013	53	0	25	78	2
September 26, 2013	52	0	25	77	3
October 11, 2013	53	0	25	78	2
December 5, 2013	54	0	25	79	1
January 6, 2014	55	0	25	80	0
April 4, 2014	55	0	24	79	1
Latest voting share	69.6%	0%	30.4%		

=== Officers ===
Position	Name	Party	District
Speaker	Toni Atkins	Democratic	78th–San Diego
Speaker pro tempore	Nora Campos	Democratic	27th–San Jose
Assistant speaker pro tempore	Kevin Mullin	Democratic	22nd–South San Francisco
Majority floor leader	V. Manuel Perez	Democratic	56th–Coachella
Assistant majority floor leader	Chris Holden	Democratic	41st–Pasadena
Majority whip	Jimmy Gomez	Democratic	51st–Echo Park
Assistant majority whips	Matt Dababneh	Democratic	45th–Encino
Assistant majority whips	Cristina Garcia	Democratic	58th–Bell Gardens
Majority caucus chair	Phil Ting	Democratic	19th–San Francisco
Minority leader	Connie Conway	Republican	26th–Tulare
Assistant minority floor leader	Curt Hagman	Republican	55th–Chino Hills
Minority caucus chair	Brian Jones	Republican	71st–Santee
Deputy minority floor leader	Don Wagner	Republican	68th–Irvine
Chief minority whip	Dan Logue	Republican	3rd–Marysville
Republican whips	Brian Maienschein	Republican	77th–San Diego
Republican whips	Marie Waldron	Republican	75th–Escondido
Chief Clerk	E. Dotson Wilson		
Sergeant-at-Arms	Ronald Pane		
Chaplain	Father Constantine Papademos		

The Chief Clerk, the Sergeant-at-Arms, and the Chaplain are not members of the Legislature.

=== Members ===
District	Image	Name	Party	Residence	Term-limited?	Notes
1		Brian Dahle	Republican	Bieber		
2		Wesley Chesbro	Democratic	Arcata	Yes	
3		Dan Logue	Republican	Marysville	Yes	
4		Mariko Yamada	Democratic	Davis	Yes	
5		Frank Bigelow	Republican	O'Neals		
6		Beth Gaines	Republican	Rocklin		
7		Roger Dickinson	Democratic	Sacramento		
8		Ken Cooley	Democratic	Rancho Cordova		
9		Richard Pan	Democratic	Sacramento		
10		Marc Levine	Democratic	San Rafael		
11		Jim Frazier	Democratic	Oakley		
12		Kristin Olsen	Republican	Modesto		
13		Susan Eggman	Democratic	Stockton		
14		Susan Bonilla	Democratic	Concord		
15		Nancy Skinner	Democratic	Berkeley	Yes	
16		Joan Buchanan	Democratic	Alamo	Yes	
17		Tom Ammiano	Democratic	San Francisco	Yes	
18		Rob Bonta	Democratic	Alameda		
19		Phil Ting	Democratic	San Francisco		
20		Bill Quirk	Democratic	Hayward		
21		Adam Gray	Democratic	Merced		
22		Kevin Mullin	Democratic	South San Francisco		
23		Jim Patterson	Republican	Fresno		
24		Rich Gordon	Democratic	Menlo Park		
25		Bob Wieckowski	Democratic	Fremont		
26		Connie Conway	Republican	Tulare	Yes	Minority leader
27		Nora Campos	Democratic	San Jose		
28		Paul Fong	Democratic	Cupertino	Yes	
29		Mark Stone	Democratic	Scotts Valley		
30		Luis Alejo	Democratic	Watsonville		
31		Henry Perea	Democratic	Fresno		
32		Rudy Salas	Democratic	Bakersfield		
33		Tim Donnelly	Republican	Twin Peaks		
34		Shannon Grove	Republican	Bakersfield		
35		Katcho Achadjian	Republican	San Luis Obispo		
36		Steve Fox	Democratic	Palmdale		
37		Das Williams	Democratic	Santa Barbara		
38		Scott Wilk	Republican	Santa Clarita		
39		Raul Bocanegra	Democratic	Pacoima		
40		Mike Morrell	Republican	Rancho Cucamonga		Resigned on April 4, 2014
40	Vacant since April 4					
41		Chris Holden	Democratic	Pasadena		
42		Brian Nestande	Republican	Palm Desert	Yes	
43		Mike Gatto	Democratic	Los Angeles		
44		Jeff Gorell	Republican	Camarillo		
45		Bob Blumenfield	Democratic	Woodland Hills	Yes	Resigned on July 1, 2013
45	Vacant from July 1, 2013, to January 6, 2014					
45		Matt Dababneh	Democratic	Encino		Sworn into office on January 6, 2014
46		Adrin Nazarian	Democratic	Sherman Oaks		
47		Cheryl Brown	Democratic	Rialto		
48		Roger Hernandez	Democratic	West Covina		
49		Ed Chau	Democratic	Monterey Park		
50		Richard Bloom	Democratic	Santa Monica		
51		Jimmy Gomez	Democratic	Echo Park		
52		Norma Torres	Democratic	Pomona	Yes	Resigned on May 16, 2013
52	Vacant from May 16 to October 11					
52		Freddie Rodriguez	Democratic	Pomona		Sworn into office on October 11, 2013
53		John Pérez	Democratic	Los Angeles	Yes	Speaker from December 3, 2012, to May 12, 2014
54		Holly Mitchell	Democratic	Los Angeles		Resigned on September 26, 2013
54	Vacant from September 26 to December 5					
54		Sebastian Ridley-Thomas	Democratic	Los Angeles		Sworn into office on December 5, 2013
55		Curt Hagman	Republican	Chino Hills	Yes	
56		V. Manuel Perez	Democratic	Coachella	Yes	
57		Ian Calderon	Democratic	Whittier		
58		Cristina Garcia	Democratic	Bell Gardens		
59		Reggie Jones-Sawyer	Democratic	Los Angeles		
60		Eric Linder	Republican	Corona		
61		Jose Medina	Democratic	Riverside		
62		Steven Bradford	Democratic	Gardena	Yes	
63		Anthony Rendon	Democratic	Lakewood		
64		Isadore Hall, III	Democratic	Compton	Yes	
65		Sharon Quirk-Silva	Democratic	Fullerton		
66		Al Muratsuchi	Democratic	Torrance		
67		Melissa Melendez	Republican	Lake Elsinore		
68		Don Wagner	Republican	Irvine		
69		Tom Daly	Democratic	Anaheim		
70		Bonnie Lowenthal	Democratic	Long Beach	Yes	
71		Brian Jones	Republican	Santee		
72		Travis Allen	Republican	Huntington Beach		
73		Diane Harkey	Republican	Dana Point	Yes	
74		Allan Mansoor	Republican	Costa Mesa		
75		Marie Waldron	Republican	Escondido		
76		Rocky Chavez	Republican	Oceanside		
77		Brian Maienschein	Republican	San Diego		
78		Toni Atkins	Democratic	San Diego		Speaker since May 12, 2014
79		Shirley Weber	Democratic	San Diego		
80		Ben Hueso	Democratic	San Diego		Resigned on March 21, 2013
80	Vacant from March 21 to May 28					
80		Lorena Gonzalez	Democratic	San Diego		Sworn into office on May 28, 2013

== See also ==
- List of California state legislatures
