= California State Legislature, 2003–2004 session =

2003–04 session of the California State Legislature
←	2001–2002	2005–2006	→
- The Seal of California

Overview
- Legislative body: California State Legislature
- Jurisdiction: California
- Term: December 2, 2002 – November 30, 2004

Senate
- Members: 40
- President of the Senate: Cruz Bustamante (D)
- President pro tempore: John L. Burton (D–3rd)
- Minority Leader: Jim Brulte (R–31st) Dec. 2, 2002–May 10, 2004; Dick Ackerman (R–33rd) May 20, 2004–Nov. 30, 2004
- Party control: Democratic

Assembly
- Members: 80
- Speaker: Herb Wesson (D–47th) Dec. 2, 2002–Feb. 9, 2004; Fabian Núñez (D–46th) Feb. 9, 2004–Nov. 30, 2004
- Minority Leader: Dave Cox (R–5th) Dec. 2, 2002–Jan. 5, 2004; Kevin McCarthy (R–32nd) Jan. 5, 2004–Nov. 30, 2004
- Party control: Democratic

The 2003–04 session was a session of the California State Legislature.

== Major legislation ==
=== Enacted ===
- California Shine the Light Law (S.B. 27), a landmark privacy law governing customers' rights in a business's disclosure of personal information to third parties.

== Members ==
- Skip to House of Representatives, below

=== Senate ===
Democrats: 25
Republicans: 15

The party affiliation and district numbers of Senators are listed after their names in this list.

President Pro Tem: John L. Burton (D-3)
Majority Leader: Don Perata (D-9)
Minority Leader: Jim Brulte (R-31) to May 10, 2004; Dick Ackerman (R-33) from May 10, 2004

District	Name	Party	Seat up
1st	Rico Oller	Rep	2004
2nd	Wesley Chesbro	Dem	2006
3rd	John Burton	Dem	2004
4th	Sam Aanestad	Rep	2006
5th	Michael Machado	Dem	2004
6th	Deborah Ortiz	Dem	2006
7th	Tom Torlakson	Dem	2004
8th	Jackie Speier	Dem	2006
9th	Don Perata	Dem	2004
10th	Liz Figueroa	Dem	2006
11th	Byron Sher	Dem	2004
12th	Jeff Denham	Rep	2006
13th	John Vasconcellos	Dem	2004
14th	Charles Poochigian	Rep	2006
15th	Bruce McPherson	Rep	2004
16th	Dean Florez	Dem	2006
17th	William "Pete" Knight	Rep	2004
18th	Roy Ashburn	Rep	2006
19th	Tom McClintock	Rep	2004
20th	Richard Alarcón	Dem	2006
21st	Jack Scott	Dem	2004
22nd	Gilbert Cedillo	Dem	2006
23rd	Sheila Kuehl	Dem	2004
24th	Gloria Romero	Dem	2006
25th	Edward Vincent	Dem	2004
26th	Kevin Murray	Dem	2006
27th	Betty Karnette	Dem	2004
28th	Debra Bowen	Dem	2006
29th	Bob Margett	Rep	2004
30th	Martha Escutia	Dem	2006
31st	Jim Brulte	Rep	2004
32nd	Nell Soto	Dem	2006
33rd	Dick Ackerman	Rep	2004
34th	Joe Dunn	Dem	2006
35th	Ross Johnson	Rep	2004
36th	Dennis Hollingsworth	Rep	2006
37th	Jim Battin	Rep	2004
38th	Bill Morrow	Rep	2006
39th	Dede Alpert	Dem	2004
40th	Denise Moreno Ducheny	Dem	2006

=== Assembly ===
Democrats: 48
Republicans: 32

=== Officers ===
- Speaker Fabian Núñez (D-46) from February 9, 2004
  - Herb J. Wesson, Jr. (D-47) to February 9, 2004
- Speaker pro Tempore Christine Kehoe (D-76)
- Assistant Speaker pro Tempore Leland Yee (D-12)
- Majority Leader Wilma Chan (D-16)
- Majority Floor Leader Marco Antonio Firebaugh (D-50)
- Minority Floor Leader Kevin McCarthy (R-32) from January 5, 2004
  - Dave Cox (R-5) to January 5, 2004
- Chief Clerk E. Dotson Wilson
- Sergeant at Arms Ronald Pane

Analysis of Bills

=== Full list of members, 2003-2004 ===
The party affiliation and district numbers of Assembly members are listed after their names in this list.

- Greg Aghazarian (R-26)
- Patricia C. Bates (R-73)
- John J. Benoit (R-64)
- Patty Berg (D-1)
- Rudy Bermúdez (D-56)
- Russ Bogh (R-65)
- Ronald S. Calderon (D-58)
- John Campbell (R-70)
- Joseph Canciamilla (D-11)
- Wilma Chan (D-16)
- Ed Chavez (D-57)
- Judy Chu (D-49)
- Dave Cogdill (R-25)
- Rebecca Cohn (D-24)
- Ellen M. Corbett (D-18)
- Lou Correa (D-69)
- Dave Cox (R-5)
- Lynn Daucher (R-72)
- Manny Diaz (D-23)
- John A. Dutra (D-20)
- Robert D. Dutton (R-63)
- Mervyn M. Dymally (D-52)
- Marco Antonio Firebaugh (D-50)
- Dario Frommer (D-43)
- Bonnie Garcia (R-80)
- Jackie Goldberg (D-45)
- Loni Hancock (D-14)
- Tom Harman (R-67)
- Ray Haynes (R-66)
- Jerome Horton (D-51)
- Shirley Horton (R-78)
- Guy S. Houston (R-15)
- Hannah-Beth Jackson (D-35)
- Rick Keene (R-3)
- Christine Kehoe (D-76)
- Paul Koretz (D-42)
- Jay La Suer (R-77)
- John Laird (D-27)
- Doug LaMalfa (R-2)
- Mark Leno (D-13)
- Tim Leslie (R-4)
- Lloyd E. Levine (D-40)
- Sally J. Lieber (D-22)
- Carol Liu (D-44)
- John Longville (D-62)
- Alan Lowenthal (D-54)
- Ken Maddox (R-68)
- Abel Maldonado (R-33)
- Barbara S. Matthews (D-17)
- Bill Maze (R-34)
- Kevin McCarthy (R-32)
- Cindy Montañez (D-39)
- Dennis Mountjoy (R-59)
- Gene Mullin (D-19)
- Alan Nakanishi (R-10)
- George Nakano (D-53)
- Joe Nation (D-6)
- Gloria Negrete McLeod (D-61)
- Fabian Núñez (D-46)
- Jenny Oropeza (D-55)
- Robert Pacheco (R-60)
- Nicole Parra (D-30)
- Fran Pavley (D-41)
- George A. Plescia (R-75)
- Sarah Reyes (D-31)
- Keith Richman (R-38)
- Mark Ridley-Thomas (D-48)
- Sharon Runner (R-36)
- Simon Salinas (D-28)
- Steven N. Samuelian (R-29)
- S. Joseph Simitian (D-21)
- Todd Spitzer (R-71)
- Darrell Steinberg (D-9)
- Tony Strickland (R-37)
- Juan Vargas (D-79)
- Herb J. Wesson, Jr. (D-47)
- Pat Wiggins (D-7)
- Lois Wolk (D-8)
- Mark Wyland (R-74)
- Leland Yee (D-12)

== See also ==
- List of California state legislatures
