= California State Legislature, 2015–2016 session =

2015–16 session of the California State Legislature
←	2013–2014	2017–2018	→
- The Seal of California

Overview
- Legislative body: California State Legislature
- Jurisdiction: California
- Term: December 1, 2014 – November 30, 2016

Senate
- Members: 40
- President of the Senate: Gavin Newsom (D); Dec. 1, 2014 – Nov. 30, 2016
- President pro tempore: Kevin de León (D–24th); Dec. 1, 2014 – Nov. 30, 2016
- Minority Leader: Bob Huff (R–29th) Dec. 1, 2014 – Aug. 27, 2015; Jean Fuller (R–16th) Aug. 27, 2015 – Nov. 30, 2016
- Party control: Democratic

Assembly
- Members: 80
- Speaker: Toni Atkins (D–78th) Dec. 1, 2014 – Mar. 7, 2016; Anthony Rendon (D–63rd) Mar. 7, 2016 – Nov. 30, 2016
- Minority Leader: Kristin Olsen (R–12th) Dec. 1, 2014 – Jan. 4, 2016; Chad Mayes (R–42nd) Jan. 4, 2016 – Nov. 30, 2016
- Party control: Democratic

The 2015–16 session was a session of the California State Legislature. The session first convened on December 1, 2014, and adjourned sine die on November 30, 2016.

== Major events ==
=== Vacancies and special elections ===
- September 22, 2014: Democratic senator Rod Wright (35th–Inglewood) resigns to serve a jail sentence after conviction for perjury and voter fraud.
- December 10, 2014: Former Democratic assemblyman Isadore Hall, III of Compton is sworn into office after winning the December 9 special election for the 35th State Senate district to replace Wright.
- January 2, 2015: Democratic senator Mark DeSaulnier (7th–Concord) resigns to take a seat in Congress.
- January 3, 2015: Republican senator Mimi Walters (37th–Irvine) resigns to take a seat in Congress.
- January 5, 2015: Republican senator Steve Knight (21st–Palmdale) resigns to take a seat in Congress.
- March 19, 2015: Former Republican senator Sharon Runner of Lancaster is sworn into office after winning the March 17 special election for the 21st State Senate district to replace Knight.
- March 22, 2015: Former Republican county supervisor John Moorlach of Costa Mesa is sworn into office after winning the March 17 special election for the 37th State Senate district to replace Walters.
- May 28, 2015: Former Orinda mayor Steve Glazer is sworn into office after winning the May 19 special election for the 7th State Senate district to replace DeSaulnier.
- December 31, 2015: Democratic assemblymember Henry Perea resigns to become senior director of state advocacy for the Pharmaceutical Research and Manufacturers of America.
- July 14, 2016: Republican senator Sharon Runner (21st–Lancaster) dies of respiratory complications related to scleroderma

=== Leadership changes ===
- August 27, 2015: Republican senator Jean Fuller (16th–Bakersfield) replaces senator Bob Huff (29th–San Dimas) as Senate minority leader, as Huff is termed out at the end of the session.
- January 4, 2016: Republican assemblymember Chad Mayes (42nd–Yucca Valley) replaces assemblymember Kristin Olsen (12th–Modesto) as Assembly minority leader, as Olsen is termed out at the end of the session.
- March 7, 2016: Democratic assemblymember Anthony Rendon (63rd–Lakewood) replaces assemblymember Toni Atkins (78th–San Diego) as speaker, as Atkins is termed out at the end of the session.

== Senate ==
Composition of the California State Senate Democratic Party Republican Party

↓
26	1	13
Democratic	Vacant	Republican

Affiliation	Party (Shading indicates majority caucus)		Total		
Affiliation	Democratic	Republican	Total	Vacant	Suspended
End of previous legislature	25	12	37	1	2
Begin	25	14	39	1	0
December 10, 2014	26	14	40	0	0
January 2, 2015	25	14	39	1	0
January 3, 2015	25	13	38	2	0
January 5, 2015	25	12	37	3	0
March 19, 2015	25	13	38	2	0
March 22, 2015	25	14	39	1	0
May 28, 2015	26	14	40	0	0
July 14, 2016	26	13	39	1	0
Latest voting share	65%	35%			

=== Officers ===
Position	Name	Party	District
Lieutenant Governor	Gavin Newsom	Democratic	
President pro tempore	Kevin de León	Democratic	24th–Los Angeles
Majority leader	Bill Monning	Democratic	17th–Carmel
Majority whip	Lois Wolk	Democratic	3rd–Davis
Majority caucus chair	Connie Leyva	Democratic	20th–Chino
Majority caucus vice chair	Mike McGuire	Democratic	2nd–Healdsburg
Minority leader	Jean Fuller	Republican	16th–Bakersfield
Minority caucus chair	Tom Berryhill	Republican	8th–Twain Harte
Minority caucus whip	Ted Gaines	Republican	1st–El Dorado Hills
Minority caucus assistant whip	Patricia Bates	Republican	36th–Laguna Niguel
Secretary	Daniel Alvarez		
Sergeant-at-Arms	Debbie Manning		
Chaplain	Sister Michelle Gorman		

The Secretary, the Sergeant-at-Arms, and the Chaplain are not members of the Legislature.

=== Members ===
District	Name	Party	Residence	Term-limited?	Notes
1	Ted Gaines	Republican	El Dorado Hills		
2	Mike McGuire	Democratic	Healdsburg		
3	Lois Wolk	Democratic	Davis	Yes	
4	Jim Nielsen	Republican	Gerber		
5	Cathleen Galgiani	Democratic	Stockton		
6	Richard Pan	Democratic	Sacramento		
7	Mark DeSaulnier	Democratic	Concord	Yes	Resigned on January 2, 2015
7	Vacant from January 2, 2015, to May 28, 2015				
7	Steve Glazer	Democratic	Orinda		Sworn into office on May 28, 2015
8	Tom Berryhill	Republican	Twain Harte		
9	Loni Hancock	Democratic	Berkeley	Yes	
10	Bob Wieckowski	Democratic	Fremont		
11	Mark Leno	Democratic	San Francisco	Yes	
12	Anthony Cannella	Republican	Ceres		
13	Jerry Hill	Democratic	San Mateo		
14	Andy Vidak	Republican	Hanford		
15	Jim Beall	Democratic	San Jose		
16	Jean Fuller	Republican	Bakersfield		Minority leader since August 27, 2015
17	Bill Monning	Democratic	Carmel		
18	Robert Hertzberg	Democratic	Van Nuys		
19	Hannah-Beth Jackson	Democratic	Santa Barbara		
20	Connie Leyva	Democratic	Chino		
21	Steve Knight	Republican	Palmdale		Resigned on January 5, 2015
21	Vacant from January 5, 2015, to March 19, 2015				
21	Sharon Runner	Republican	Lancaster		Sworn into office on March 19, 2015, died July 14, 2016
21	Vacant from July 14, 2016, to November 30, 2016				
22	Ed Hernandez	Democratic	West Covina		
23	Mike Morrell	Republican	Rancho Cucamonga		
24	Kevin de León	Democratic	Los Angeles		President pro tempore
25	Carol Liu	Democratic	La Cañada Flintridge	Yes	
26	Ben Allen	Democratic	Santa Monica		
27	Fran Pavley	Democratic	Agoura Hills	Yes	
28	Jeff Stone	Republican	Temecula		
29	Bob Huff	Republican	San Dimas	Yes	Minority leader from January 5, 2012, to August 27, 2015
30	Holly Mitchell	Democratic	Los Angeles		
31	Richard Roth	Democratic	Riverside		
32	Tony Mendoza	Democratic	Artesia		
33	Ricardo Lara	Democratic	Bell Gardens		
34	Janet Nguyen	Republican	Garden Grove		
35	Vacant from September 22, 2014, to December 10, 2014				
35	Isadore Hall, III	Democratic	Compton		Sworn into office on December 10, 2014
36	Patricia Bates	Republican	Laguna Niguel		
37	Mimi Walters	Republican	Irvine		Resigned on January 3, 2015
37	Vacant from January 3, 2015, to March 22, 2015				
37	John Moorlach	Republican	Costa Mesa		Sworn into office on March 22, 2015
38	Joel Anderson	Republican	Alpine		
39	Marty Block	Democratic	San Diego		
40	Ben Hueso	Democratic	San Diego		

== Assembly ==
Composition of the California State Assembly Democratic Party Republican Party

↓
52	28
Democratic	Republican

Affiliation	Party (Shading indicates majority caucus)		Total	
Affiliation	Democratic	Republican	Total	Vacant
End of previous legislature	55	24	79	1
Begin	52	28	80	0
December 31, 2015	51	28	79	1
April 14, 2016	52	28	80	0
Latest voting share	65%	35%		

=== Officers ===
Position	Name	Party	District
Speaker	Anthony Rendon	Democratic	63rd–Lakewood
Speaker emeritus	Toni Atkins	Democratic	78th–San Diego
Speaker pro tempore	Kevin Mullin	Democratic	22nd–South San Francisco
Assistant speaker pro tempore	Autumn Burke	Democratic	62nd–Marina del Rey
Majority floor leader	Ian Calderon	Democratic	57th–Whittier
Assistant majority floor leader	Jim Cooper	Democratic	9th–Elk Grove
Majority whip	Miguel Santiago	Democratic	53rd–Los Angeles
Democratic whip	Nora Campos	Democratic	27th–San Jose
Assistant majority whip	Evan Low	Democratic	28th–Campbell
Majority caucus chair	Mike Gipson	Democratic	64th–Carson
Minority leader	Chad Mayes	Republican	42nd–Yucca Valley
Assistant minority leaders	Frank Bigelow	Republican	5th–O'Neals
Assistant minority leaders	Jay Obernolte	Republican	33rd–Big Bear Lake
Assistant minority leaders	Kristin Olsen	Republican	12th–Riverbank
Minority caucus chair	Brian Jones	Republican	71st–Santee
Minority floor leader	Marie Waldron	Republican	75th–Escondido
Deputy minority floor leader	Bill Brough	Republican	73rd–Dana Point
Chief minority whip	James Gallagher	Republican	3rd–Nicolaus
Minority whips	Ling Ling Chang	Republican	55th–Diamond Bar
Minority whips	Beth Gaines	Republican	6th–Roseville
Chief Clerk	E. Dotson Wilson		
Sergeant-at-Arms	Ronald Pane		
Chaplain	Father Constantine Papademos		

The Chief Clerk, the Sergeant-at-Arms, and the Chaplain are not members of the Legislature.

=== Members ===
District	Name	Party	Residence	Term-limited?	Notes
1	Brian Dahle	Republican	Bieber		
2	Jim Wood	Democratic	Healdsburg		
3	James Gallagher	Republican	Nicolaus		
4	Bill Dodd	Democratic	Napa		
5	Frank Bigelow	Republican	O'Neals		
6	Beth Gaines	Republican	El Dorado Hills	Yes	
7	Kevin McCarty	Democratic	Sacramento		
8	Ken Cooley	Democratic	Rancho Cordova		
9	Jim Cooper	Democratic	Elk Grove		
10	Marc Levine	Democratic	San Rafael		
11	Jim Frazier	Democratic	Oakley		
12	Kristin Olsen	Republican	Riverbank	Yes	Minority leader from December 1, 2014, to January 4, 2016
13	Susan Eggman	Democratic	Stockton		
14	Susan Bonilla	Democratic	Concord	Yes	
15	Tony Thurmond	Democratic	Richmond		
16	Catharine Baker	Republican	Dublin		
17	David Chiu	Democratic	San Francisco		
18	Rob Bonta	Democratic	Alameda		
19	Phil Ting	Democratic	San Francisco		
20	Bill Quirk	Democratic	Hayward		
21	Adam Gray	Democratic	Merced		
22	Kevin Mullin	Democratic	South San Francisco		
23	Jim Patterson	Republican	Fresno		
24	Rich Gordon	Democratic	Menlo Park	Yes	
25	Kansen Chu	Democratic	San Jose		
26	Devon Mathis	Republican	Visalia		
27	Nora Campos	Democratic	San Jose	Yes	
28	Evan Low	Democratic	Campbell		
29	Mark Stone	Democratic	Scotts Valley		
30	Luis Alejo	Democratic	Salinas	Yes	
31	Henry Perea	Democratic	Fresno	Yes	Resigned on December 31, 2015
31	Vacant from December 31, 2015, to April 14, 2016				
31	Joaquin Arambula	Democratic	Kingsburg		Sworn into office on April 14, 2016
32	Rudy Salas	Democratic	Bakersfield		
33	Jay Obernolte	Republican	Big Bear Lake		
34	Shannon Grove	Republican	Bakersfield	Yes	
35	Katcho Achadjian	Republican	San Luis Obispo	Yes	
36	Tom Lackey	Republican	Palmdale		
37	Das Williams	Democratic	Carpinteria	Yes	
38	Scott Wilk	Republican	Santa Clarita		
39	Patty Lopez	Democratic	San Fernando		
40	Marc Steinorth	Republican	Rancho Cucamonga		
41	Chris Holden	Democratic	Pasadena		
42	Chad Mayes	Republican	Yucca Valley		Minority leader since January 4, 2016
43	Mike Gatto	Democratic	Los Angeles	Yes	
44	Jacqui Irwin	Democratic	Thousand Oaks		
45	Matt Dababneh	Democratic	Encino		
46	Adrin Nazarian	Democratic	Sherman Oaks		
47	Cheryl Brown	Democratic	Rialto		
48	Roger Hernandez	Democratic	West Covina	Yes	
49	Ed Chau	Democratic	Monterey Park		
50	Richard Bloom	Democratic	Santa Monica		
51	Jimmy Gomez	Democratic	Echo Park		
52	Freddie Rodriguez	Democratic	Pomona		
53	Miguel Santiago	Democratic	Los Angeles		
54	Sebastian Ridley-Thomas	Democratic	Los Angeles		
55	Ling Ling Chang	Republican	Diamond Bar		
56	Eduardo Garcia	Democratic	Coachella		
57	Ian Calderon	Democratic	Whittier		
58	Cristina Garcia	Democratic	Bell Gardens		
59	Reggie Jones-Sawyer	Democratic	Los Angeles		
60	Eric Linder	Republican	Corona		
61	Jose Medina	Democratic	Riverside		
62	Autumn Burke	Democratic	Marina del Rey		
63	Anthony Rendon	Democratic	Lakewood		Speaker since March 7, 2016
64	Mike Gipson	Democratic	Carson		
65	Young Kim	Republican	Fullerton		
66	David Hadley	Republican	Manhattan Beach		
67	Melissa Melendez	Republican	Lake Elsinore		
68	Don Wagner	Republican	Irvine	Yes	
69	Tom Daly	Democratic	Anaheim		
70	Patrick O'Donnell	Democratic	Long Beach		
71	Brian Jones	Republican	Santee	Yes	
72	Travis Allen	Republican	Huntington Beach		
73	Bill Brough	Republican	Dana Point		
74	Matthew Harper	Republican	Huntington Beach		
75	Marie Waldron	Republican	Escondido		
76	Rocky Chavez	Republican	Oceanside		
77	Brian Maienschein	Republican	San Diego		
78	Toni Atkins	Democratic	San Diego	Yes	Speaker from December 1, 2014, to March 7, 2016
79	Shirley Weber	Democratic	San Diego		
80	Lorena Gonzalez	Democratic	San Diego		

== See also ==
- List of California state legislatures
