= California State Legislature, 1997–1998 session =

1997–98 session of the California State Legislature
←	1995–1996	1999–2000	→
- The Seal of California

Overview
- Legislative body: California State Legislature
- Jurisdiction: California
- Term: December 2, 1996 – November 30, 1998

Senate
- Members: 40
- President of the Senate: Gray Davis (D)
- President pro tempore: Bill Lockyer (D–10th) Dec. 2, 1996–Feb. 5, 1998; John L. Burton (D–3rd) Feb. 5, 1998–Nov. 30, 1998
- Minority Leader: Rob Hurtt (R–34th) Dec. 2, 1996–Mar. 16, 1998; Ross Johnson (R–35th) Mar. 16, 1998–Nov. 30, 1998
- Party control: Democratic

Assembly
- Members: 80
- Speaker: Cruz Bustamante (D–31st) Dec. 2, 1996–Feb. 26, 1998; Antonio Villaraigosa (D–45th) Feb. 26, 1998–Nov. 30, 1998
- Minority Leader: Bill Leonard (R–63rd) Dec. 2, 1996–Nov. 5, 1998; Rod Pacheco (R–64th) Nov. 5, 1998–Nov. 30, 1998
- Party control: Democratic

The 1997–98 session was a former session of the California State Legislature.

== Members ==
- Skip to Assembly, below

=== Assembly ===
Democrats: 43
Republicans: 37

=== Officers ===
- Speaker Antonio Villaraigosa (D-45) from February 26, 1998
  - Cruz Bustamante (D-31) to February 26, 1998
- Speaker pro Tempore Sheila Kuehl (D-41)
- Majority Floor Leader Kevin Shelley (D-12)
- Minority Floor Leader Rod Pacheco (R-64) from November 5, 1998
  - Bill Leonard (R-63) to November 5, 1998
- Chief Clerk E. Dotson Wilson
- Sergeant at Arms Ronald Pane

Note: The Chief Clerk and the Sergeant at Arms are not Members of the Legislature

Analysis of Bills

The party affiliation and district numbers of Assembly members are listed after their names in this list.

District	Name	Party
1st	Virginia Strom-Martin	Dem
2nd	Tom Woods	Rep
3rd	Bernie Richter	Rep
4th	Thomas "Rico" Oller	Rep
5th	Barbara Alby	Rep
6th	Kerry Mazzoni	Dem
7th	Valerie K. Brown	Dem
8th	Helen Thomson	Dem
9th	Deborah Ortiz	Dem
10th	Larry Bowler	Rep
11th	Tom Torlakson	Dem
12th	Kevin Shelley	Dem
13th	Carole Migden	Dem
14th	Dion Aroner	Dem
15th	Lynne Leach	Rep
16th	Don Perata	Dem
17th	Michael Machado	Dem
18th	Michael Sweeney	Dem
19th	Louis J. Papan	Dem
20th	Liz Figueroa	Dem
21st	Ted Lempert	Dem
22nd	Elaine Alquist	Dem
23rd	Mike Honda	Dem
24th	Jim Cunneen	Rep
25th	George House	Rep
26th	Dennis Cardoza	Dem
27th	Fred Keeley	Dem
28th	Peter Frusetta	Rep
29th	Charles Poochigian	Rep
30th	Robert Prenter	Rep
31st	Cruz M. Bustamante	Dem
32nd	Roy Ashburn	Rep
33rd	Tom J. Bordonaro, Jr.	Rep
34th	Keith Olberg	Rep
35th	Brooks Firestone	Rep
36th	George Runner	Rep
37th	Nao Takasugi	Rep
38th	Tom McClintock	Rep
39th	Tony Cardenas	Dem
40th	Robert M. Hertzberg	Dem
41st	Sheila James Kuehl	Dem
42nd	Wally Knox	Dem
43rd	Scott Wildman	Dem
44th	Jack Scott	Dem
45th	Antonio R. Villaraigosa	Dem
46th	Louis Caldera	Dem
47th	Kevin Murray	Dem
48th	Roderick Wright	Dem
49th	Diane Martinez	Dem
50th	Martha M. Escutia	Dem
51st	Edward Vincent	Dem
52nd	Carl Washington	Dem
53rd	Debra Bowen	Dem
54th	Steven T. Kuykendall	Rep
55th	Richard Floyd	Dem
56th	Sally Havice	Dem
57th	Martin Gallegos	Dem
58th	Grace F. Napolitano	Dem
59th	Bob Margett	Rep
60th	Gary G. Miller	Rep
61st	Fred Aguiar	Rep
62nd	Joe Baca	Dem
63rd	Bill Leonard	Rep
64th	Rod Pacheco	Rep
65th	Brett Granlund	Rep
66th	Bruce Thompson	Rep
67th	Scott Baugh	Rep
68th	Curt Pringle	Rep
69th	Jim Morrissey	Rep
70th	Marilyn C. Brewer	Rep
71st	Bill Campbell	Rep
72nd	Dick Ackerman	Rep
73rd	Bill Morrow	Rep
74th	Howard Kaloogian	Rep
75th	Jan Goldsmith	Rep
76th	Susan Davis	Dem
77th	Steve Baldwin	Rep
78th	Howard Wayne	Dem
79th	Denise Moreno Ducheny	Dem
80th	Jim Battin	Rep

== See also ==
- List of California state legislatures
