= California State Legislature, 2005–2006 session =

2005-2006 session of the California State Legislature
←	2003–2004	2007–2008	→
- The Seal of California

Overview
- Legislative body: California State Legislature
- Jurisdiction: California
- Term: December 6, 2004 – November 30, 2006

Senate
- Members: 40
- President of the Senate: Cruz Bustamante (D)
- President pro tempore: Don Perata (D–9th)
- Minority Leader: Dick Ackerman (R–33rd)
- Party control: Democratic

Assembly
- Members: 80
- Speaker: Fabian Núñez (D–46th)
- Minority Leader: Kevin McCarthy (R–32nd) Dec. 6, 2004–Apr. 17, 2006; George Plescia (R–75th) Apr. 17, 2006–Nov. 10, 2006; Michael Villines (R–29th) Nov. 10, 2006–Nov. 30, 2006
- Party control: Democratic

The 2005–06 session was a session of the California State Legislature.

== Major legislation and reports ==
=== Enacted ===
- SB 1613 - Law banning the use of cell phones in cars. This was amended, effective in 2018, to clarify what was legal or illegal.

=== Reports ===
Various statewide officials, departments, and commissions filed reports with the Legislature during this session. Possibly the most important report was notice of a "significant" and "structural budget problem".

== Legislators ==
=== Senate ===
Democrats: 25
Republicans: 15

The party affiliation and district numbers of Senators are listed after their names in this list.

President Pro Tem: Don Perata (D-9)
Majority Leader: Gloria Romero (D-24)
Minority Leader: Dick Ackerman (R-33)

District	Name	Party	Seat up
1st	Dave Cox	Rep	2008
2nd	Wesley Chesbro; Term limited	Dem	2006
3rd	Carole Migden	Dem	2008
4th	Sam Aanestad	Rep	2006
5th	Michael Machado	Dem	2008
6th	Deborah Ortiz; Term limited. Lost primary election for Secretary of State	Dem	2006
7th	Tom Torlakson	Dem	2008
8th	Jackie Speier; Term limited. Lost primary election for Lieutenant Governor	Dem	2006
9th	Don Perata	Dem	2008
10th	Liz Figueroa; Term limited. Lost primary election for Lieutenant Governor	Dem	2006
11th	Joe Simitian	Dem	2008
12th	Jeff Denham	Rep	2006
13th	Elaine Alquist	Dem	2008
14th	Charles Poochigian; Term limited. Lost general election for Attorney General	Rep	2006
15th	Abel Maldonado	Rep	2008
16th	Dean Florez	Dem	2006
17th	George Runner	Rep	2008
18th	Roy Ashburn	Rep	2006
19th	Tom McClintock; Lost general election for Lieutenant Governor	Rep	2008
20th	Richard Alarcón; Term limited. Elected to California State Assembly, 39th District	Dem	2006
21st	Jack Scott	Dem	2008
22nd	Gilbert Cedillo	Dem	2006
23rd	Sheila Kuehl	Dem	2008
24th	Gloria Romero	Dem	2006
25th	Edward Vincent	Dem	2008
26th	Kevin Murray; Term limited	Dem	2006
27th	Alan S. Lowenthal	Dem	2008
28th	Debra Bowen; Term limited. Elected; Secretary of State	Dem	2006
29th	Bob Margett	Rep	2008
30th	Martha Escutia; Term limited	Dem	2006
31st	Robert Dutton	Rep	2008
32nd	Nell Soto; Term limited. Elected to California State Assembly, 61st District	Dem	2006
33rd	Dick Ackerman	Rep	2008
34th	Joe Dunn; Term limited	Dem	2006
35th	John Campbell; Tom Harman*	Rep	2008
36th	Dennis Hollingsworth	Rep	2006
37th	Jim Battin	Rep	2008
38th	Bill Morrow; Term limited	Rep	2006
39th	Christine Kehoe	Dem	2008
40th	Denise Moreno Ducheny	Dem	2006

* Tom Harman won the June 6, 2006 special election (and was sworn in on June 12, 2006) for the 35th Senate District seat to replace John Campbell, who vacated his State Senate seat on December 7, 2005 to become a member of the United States House of Representatives.

=== Assembly ===
Affiliation	Members
Democratic Party	48
Republican Party	32
Total	80
Majority	16

=== Officers ===
- Speaker Fabian Núñez (D-46)
- Speaker pro Tempore Leland Yee, Ph.D. (D-12)
- Assistant Speaker pro Tempore Sally J. Lieber (D-22)
- Majority Floor Leader Dario Frommer (D-43)
- Minority Floor Leader Michael Villines (R-29) from November 10, 2006
  - George A. Plescia (R-75) from April 17, 2006 to November 10, 2006
  - Kevin McCarthy (R-32) to April 17, 2006
- Chief Clerk E. Dotson Wilson
- Sergeant at Arms Ronald Pane

Note: The Chief Clerk and the Sergeant at Arms are not Members of the Legislature

=== Full List of Members, 2005-2006 ===
District	Name	Party
1st	Patty Berg	Dem
2nd	Doug LaMalfa	Rep
3rd	Rick Keene	Rep
4th	Tim Leslie; Term limited	Rep
5th	Roger Niello	Rep
6th	Joe Nation; Term limited	Dem
7th	Noreen Evans	Dem
8th	Lois Wolk	Dem
9th	Dave Jones	Dem
10th	Alan Nakanishi	Rep
11th	Joseph Canciamilla; Term limited	Dem
12th	Leland Yee; Elected to State Senate, 8th District	Dem
13th	Mark Leno	Dem
14th	Loni Hancock	Dem
15th	Guy S. Houston	Rep
16th	Wilma Chan; Term limited	Dem
17th	Barbara S. Matthews; Term limited	Dem
18th	Johan Klehs; Term limited. Lost primary for State Senate, 10th District	Dem
19th	Gene Mullin	Dem
20th	Alberto Torrico	Dem
21st	Ira Ruskin	Dem
22nd	Sally J. Lieber	Dem
23rd	Joe Coto	Dem
24th	Rebecca Cohn; Term limited	Dem
25th	Dave Cogdill; Term limited. Elected to State Senate, 14th District	Rep
26th	Greg Aghazarian	Rep
27th	John Laird	Dem
28th	Simon Salinas; Term limited	Dem
29th	Michael Villines	Rep
30th	Nicole Parra	Dem
31st	Juan Arambula	Dem
32nd	Kevin McCarthy; Elected to U.S. Congress, 22nd District	Rep
33rd	Sam Blakeslee	Rep
34th	Bill Maze	Rep
35th	Pedro Nava	Dem
36th	Sharon Runner	Rep
37th	Audra Strickland	Rep
38th	Keith Richman; Term limited. Lost primary for State Treasurer	Rep
39th	Cindy Montañez; Lost primary for State Senate, 20th District	Dem
40th	Lloyd E. Levine	Dem
41st	Fran Pavley; Term limited	Dem
42nd	Paul Koretz; Term limited	Dem
43rd	Dario Frommer; Term limited	Dem
44th	Carol Liu; Term limited	Dem
45th	Jackie Goldberg; Term limited	Dem
46th	Fabian Nuñez	Dem
47th	Karen Bass	Dem
48th	Mark Ridley-Thomas; Elected to State Senate, 26th District	Dem
49th	Judy Chu; Term limited. Elected to Board of Equalization, 4th District	Dem
50th	Hector De La Torre	Dem
51st	Jerome Horton; Term limited. Lost primary for Board of Equalization, 4th District	Dem
52nd	Mervyn M. Dymally	Dem
53rd	Mike Gordon*; Ted Lieu*	Dem
54th	Betty Karnette	Dem
55th	Jenny Oropeza; Term limited. Elected to State Senate, 28th District	Dem
56th	Rudy Bermúdez; Lost primary for State Senate, 30th District	Dem
57th	Ed Chavez; Term limited	Dem
58th	Ronald S. Calderon; Elected to State Senate, 30th District	Dem
59th	Dennis Mountjoy; Term limited	Rep
60th	Bob Huff	Rep
61st	Gloria Negrete McLeod; Term limited. Elected to State Senate, 32nd District	Dem
62nd	Joe Baca, Jr. Lost primary for State Senate, 32nd District; Elected to Rialto City Council	Dem
63rd	Bill Emmerson	Rep
64th	John J. Benoit	Rep
65th	Russ Bogh; Term limited	Rep
66th	Ray Haynes; Term limited. Lost primary for Board of Equalization, 3rd District	Rep
67th	Tom Harman*; Term limited. Elected to State Senate, 35th District	Rep
68th	Van Tran	Rep
69th	Tom Umberg; Term limited. Lost primary for State Senate, 34th District	Dem
70th	Chuck DeVore	Rep
71st	Todd Spitzer	Rep
72nd	Lynn Daucher; Term limited. Lost general election for State Senate, 34th District	Rep
73rd	Mimi Walters	Rep
74th	Mark Wyland; Term limited. Elected to State Senate, 38th District	Rep
75th	George A. Plescia	Rep
76th	Lori Saldaña	Dem
77th	Jay La Suer; Term limited	Rep
78th	Shirley Horton	Rep
79th	Juan Vargas	Dem
80th	Bonnie Garcia	Rep

* Ted Lieu won the September 13, 2005 special election (and was sworn in on September 21, 2005) for the 53rd Assembly District seat to replace Mike Gordon, who died on June 25, 2005, due to a brain tumor.
* Assemblyman Tom Harman won the June 6, 2006 special election for the 35th District seat in the California State Senate and resigned from the Assembly (and was sworn into the Senate) on June 12, 2006. He would have been term limited at the end of 2006.

== See also ==
- List of California state legislatures
