= California State Legislature, 2007–2008 session =

2007–08 session of the California State Legislature
←	2005–2006	2009–2010	→
- The Seal of California

Overview
- Legislative body: California State Legislature
- Jurisdiction: California
- Term: December 4, 2006 – August 30, 2008

Senate
- Members: 40
- President of the Senate: John Garamendi (D)
- President pro tempore: Don Perata (D–9th)
- Minority Leader: Dick Ackerman (R–33rd) Dec. 4, 2006–Apr. 15, 2008; Dave Cogdill (R–14th) Apr. 15, 2008–Aug. 31, 2008
- Party control: Democratic

Assembly
- Members: 80
- Speaker: Fabian Núñez (D–46th) Dec. 4, 2006–May 13, 2008; Karen Bass (D–47th) May 13, 2008–Aug. 31, 2008
- Minority Leader: Michael Villines (R–29th)
- Party control: Democratic

The 2007–08 session was a meeting of the California State Legislature.

== Dates of sessions ==
Convene: December 4, 2006
Adjourn: August 31, 2008

== Major events ==
=== Vacancies and special elections ===
- March 16, 2007: Assemblyman Richard Alarcón (D-39) resigns to take a seat on the Los Angeles City Council
- May 15, 2007: Felipe Fuentes (D-Sylmar) wins the special election for the 39th Assembly District seat to replace Alarcón and is sworn in on May 25
- September 4, 2007: Assemblywoman Laura Richardson (D-55) resigns to take a seat in the United States House of Representatives, replacing Congresswoman Juanita Millender-McDonald, who died on April 22, 2007
- February 5, 2008: Warren T. Furutani (D-Gardena) wins the special election for the 55th Assembly District seat to replace Richardson and is sworn in on February 7
- June 3, 2008: The recall election against Senator Jeff Denham (R-12) fails, with over 75% of the voters deciding to keep Denham in office

=== Leadership changes ===
- February 7, 2008: Senator Darrell Steinberg (D-6) is named to replace Senator Don Perata (D-9) as president pro tempore of the Senate, as Perata is termed out at the end of the term
- April 15, 2008: Senator Dave Cogdill (R-14) replaces Senator Dick Ackerman (R-33) as Senate Republican Leader, as Ackerman is termed out at the end of the term
- May 13, 2008: Assemblywoman Karen Bass (D-47) replaces Assemblyman Fabian Núñez (D-46) as Speaker of the Assembly, as Núñez is termed out at the end of the term

== Members ==
- Skip to Assembly, below

=== Senate ===
Democrats: 25
Republicans: 15

California State Senate
Affiliation	Party (Shading indicates majority caucus)		Total	
Affiliation	Democratic	Republican	Total	Vacant
End of previous legislature	25	15	40	0
Begin	25	15	40	0
Final voting share	62.5%	37.5%		

=== Officers ===
President Pro Tem: Don Perata (D-9)
Majority Leader: Gloria Romero (D-24)
Minority Leader: Dick Ackerman (R-33) to April 15, 2008; Dave Cogdill (R-14) from April 15, 2008

=== Full list of members, 2007-2008 ===
District	Name	Party	Seat up
1st	Dave Cox	Rep	2008
2nd	Pat Wiggins	Dem	2010
3rd	Carole Migden	Dem	2008
4th	Sam Aanestad	Rep	2010
5th	Michael Machado; Term limited	Dem	2008
6th	Darrell Steinberg	Dem	2010
7th	Tom Torlakson; Term limited	Dem	2008
8th	Leland Yee	Dem	2010
9th	Don Perata; Term limited	Dem	2008
10th	Ellen M. Corbett	Dem	2010
11th	Joe Simitian	Dem	2008
12th	Jeff Denham	Rep	2010
13th	Elaine Alquist	Dem	2008
14th	Dave Cogdill	Rep	2010
15th	Abel Maldonado	Rep	2008
16th	Dean Florez	Dem	2010
17th	George Runner	Rep	2008
18th	Roy Ashburn	Rep	2010
19th	Tom McClintock; Term limited	Rep	2008
20th	Alex Padilla	Dem	2010
21st	Jack Scott; Term limited	Dem	2008
22nd	Gilbert Cedillo	Dem	2010
23rd	Sheila Kuehl; Term limited	Dem	2008
24th	Gloria Romero	Dem	2010
25th	Edward Vincent; Term limited	Dem	2008
26th	Mark Ridley-Thomas	Dem	2010
27th	Alan Lowenthal	Dem	2008
28th	Jenny Oropeza	Dem	2010
29th	Bob Margett; Term limited	Rep	2008
30th	Ronald S. Calderon	Dem	2010
31st	Robert Dutton	Rep	2008
32nd	Gloria Negrete McLeod	Dem	2010
33rd	Dick Ackerman; Term limited	Rep	2008
34th	Lou Correa	Dem	2010
35th	Tom Harman	Rep	2008
36th	Dennis Hollingsworth	Rep	2010
37th	Jim Battin; Term limited	Rep	2008
38th	Mark Wyland	Rep	2010
39th	Christine Kehoe	Dem	2008
40th	Denise Moreno Ducheny	Dem	2010

=== Assembly ===
Affiliation	Members
Democratic Party	48
Republican Party	32
Total	80
Majority	16

California State Assembly
Affiliation	Party (Shading indicates majority caucus)		Total	
Affiliation	Democratic	Republican	Total	Vacant
End of previous legislature	48	32	80	0
Begin	48	32	80	0
March 16, 2007	47	32	79	1
May 15, 2007	48	32	80	0
September 4, 2007	47	32	79	1
February 7, 2008	48	32	80	0
Final voting share	60.0%	40.0%		

=== Officers ===
- Speaker Karen Bass (D-47) from May 13, 2008
  - Fabian Núñez (D-46) to May 13, 2008
- Speaker pro Tempore Sally J. Lieber (D-22)
- Assistant Speaker Pro Tempore Lori Saldaña (D-76) from May 16, 2008
  - Laura Richardson (D-55) to September 4, 2007
- Majority Floor Leader Alberto Torrico (D-20) from May 13, 2008
  - Karen Bass (D-47) to May 13, 2008
- Minority Floor Leader Michael Villines (R-29)
- Chief Clerk E. Dotson Wilson
- Sergeant at Arms Ronald Pane

Note: The Chief Clerk and the Sergeant at Arms are not Members of the Legislature

=== Full List of Members, 2007-2008 ===
District	Name	Party
1st	Patty Berg	Dem
2nd	Doug LaMalfa	Rep
3rd	Rick Keene	Rep
4th	Ted Gaines	Rep
5th	Roger Niello	Rep
6th	Jared Huffman	Dem
7th	Noreen Evans	Dem
8th	Lois Wolk	Dem
9th	Dave Jones	Dem
10th	Alan Nakanishi	Rep
11th	Mark DeSaulnier	Dem
12th	Fiona Ma	Dem
13th	Mark Leno	Dem
14th	Loni Hancock	Dem
15th	Guy S. Houston	Rep
16th	Sandré Swanson	Dem
17th	Cathleen Galgiani	Dem
18th	Mary Hayashi	Dem
19th	Gene Mullin	Dem
20th	Alberto Torrico	Dem
21st	Ira Ruskin	Dem
22nd	Sally J. Lieber	Dem
23rd	Joe Coto	Dem
24th	Jim Beall Jr.	Dem
25th	Tom Berryhill	Rep
26th	Greg Aghazarian	Rep
27th	John Laird	Dem
28th	Anna M. Caballero	Dem
29th	Michael Villines	Rep
30th	Nicole Parra	Dem
31st	Juan Arambula	Dem
32nd	Jean Fuller	Rep
33rd	Sam Blakeslee	Rep
34th	Bill Maze	Rep
35th	Pedro Nava	Dem
36th	Sharon Runner	Rep
37th	Audra Strickland	Rep
38th	Cameron Smyth	Rep
39th	Richard Alarcón*; Felipe Fuentes*	Dem
40th	Lloyd E. Levine	Dem
41st	Julia Brownley	Dem
42nd	Mike Feuer	Dem
43rd	Paul Krekorian	Dem
44th	Anthony J. Portantino	Dem
45th	Kevin de León	Dem
46th	Fabian Núñez	Dem
47th	Karen Bass	Dem
48th	Mike Davis	Dem
49th	Mike Eng	Dem
50th	Hector De La Torre	Dem
51st	Curren D. Price Jr.	Dem
52nd	Mervyn M. Dymally	Dem
53rd	Ted Lieu	Dem
54th	Betty Karnette	Dem
55th	Laura Richardson**; Warren T. Furutani**	Dem
56th	Tony Mendoza	Dem
57th	Edward P. Hernandez	Dem
58th	Charles M. Calderon	Dem
59th	Anthony Adams	Rep
60th	Bob Huff	Rep
61st	Nell Soto	Dem
62nd	Wilmer Amina Carter	Dem
63rd	Bill Emmerson	Rep
64th	John J. Benoit	Rep
65th	Paul Cook	Rep
66th	Kevin Jeffries	Rep
67th	Jim Silva	Rep
68th	Van Tran	Rep
69th	Jose Solorio	Dem
70th	Chuck DeVore	Rep
71st	Todd Spitzer	Rep
72nd	Michael D. Duvall	Rep
73rd	Mimi Walters	Rep
74th	Martin Garrick	Rep
75th	George A. Plescia	Rep
76th	Lori Saldaña	Dem
77th	Joel Anderson	Rep
78th	Shirley Horton	Rep
79th	Mary Salas	Dem
80th	Bonnie Garcia	Rep

*Felipe Fuentes won the May 15, 2007, special election for the 39th Assembly District seat to replace Richard Alarcón, who resigned on March 16, 2007, to take a seat on the Los Angeles City Council.

**Warren T. Furutani won the February 5, 2008, special election for the 55th Assembly District seat to replace Laura Richardson, who resigned on September 4, 2007, to take a seat in the United States House of Representatives, replacing Juanita Millender-McDonald who died on April 22, 2007.

=== 2006 elections ===
The last Assembly elections occurred on November 7, 2006. The Democratic Party retained their majority, with no loss or gain of seats for any party.

Party	Votes	Seats	Loss/Gain	Share of Vote (%)
Democratic	4,449,698	48	0	55.2
Republican	3,448,781	32	0	42.8
Libertarian	93,588	0	0	1.16
Green	35,283	0	0	.44
Peace and Freedom	29,384	0	0	.36
Total	8,056,734	80	0	100.0%

== See also ==
- List of California state legislatures
