= Willow Glen, Madera County, California =

Willow Glen
- Former settlement
- Location in California
- Coordinates: 37°12′43″N 119°42′30″W
- Country: United States
- State: California
- County: Madera
- Elevation: 1,831 ft (558 m)

Willow Glen is a former settlement in Madera County, California, United States. It was located 6 miles (9.7 km) north of O'Neals, at an elevation of 1831 feet (558 m).
