= California State Legislature, 2001–2002 session =

2001–02 session of the California State Legislature
←	1999–2000	2003–2004	→
- The Seal of California

Overview
- Legislative body: California State Legislature
- Jurisdiction: California
- Term: December 4, 2000 – November 30, 2002

Senate
- Members: 40
- President of the Senate: Cruz Bustamante (D)
- President pro tempore: John L. Burton (D–3rd)
- Minority Leader: Jim Brulte (R–31st)
- Party control: Democratic

Assembly
- Members: 80
- Speaker: Robert Hertzberg (D–40th) Dec. 4, 2000–Feb. 6, 2002; Herb Wesson (D–47th) Feb. 6, 2002–Nov. 30, 2002
- Minority Leader: Bill Campbell (R–71st) Dec. 4, 2000–Mar. 26, 2001; Dave Cox (R–5th) Mar. 26, 2001–Nov. 30, 2002
- Party control: Democratic

The 2001–02 session was a session of the California State Legislature.

== Major events ==
=== Vacancies and special elections ===
- December 1, 2000: After pleading guilty to campaign finance violations, Jan Leja (R) agreed not to take the seat she was elected to in November 2000 for the 65th Assembly District.
- January 2001: Senator Hilda Solis (D-24) resigned to take a seat in the United States House of Representatives.
- March 6, 2001: Assembly member Gloria Romero (D-49) won the special election in the 24th Senate District to replace Solis.
- April 3, 2001: Russ Bogh (R) won the special election in the 65th Assembly District to replace Leja.
- May 15, 2001: Judy Chu (D) won the special election in the 49th Assembly District to replace Romero.

== Members ==
- Skip to Assembly, below

=== Senate ===
Democrats: 26
Republicans: 14

The party affiliation and district numbers of Senators are listed after their names in this list.

President Pro Tem: John L. Burton (D-3)
Majority Leader: Richard Polanco (D-22)
Minority Leader: Jim Brulte (R-31)

District	Name	Party	Notes
1st	Rico Oller	Rep	
2nd	Wesley Chesbro	Dem	
3rd	John Burton	Dem	
4th	Maurice Johannessen	Rep	
5th	Michael Machado	Dem	
6th	Deborah Ortiz	Dem	
7th	Tom Torlakson	Dem	
8th	Jackie Speier	Dem	
9th	Don Perata	Dem	
10th	Liz Figueroa	Dem	
11th	Byron Sher	Dem	
12th	Dick Monteith	Rep	
13th	John Vasconcellos	Dem	
14th	Charles Poochigian	Rep	
15th	Bruce McPherson	Rep	
16th	Jim Costa	Dem	
17th	Pete Knight	Rep	
18th	Jack O'Connell	Dem	
19th	Tom McClintock	Rep	
20th	Richard Alarcón	Dem	
21st	Jack Scott	Dem	
22nd	Richard Polanco	Dem	
23rd	Sheila Kuehl	Dem	
24th	Hilda Solis	Dem	Resigned January 3, 2001, to take seat in United States House of Representatives.
24th	vacant		
24th	Gloria Romero	Dem	Elected March 6, 2001.
25th	Edward Vincent	Dem	
26th	Kevin Murray	Dem	
27th	Betty Karnette	Dem	
28th	Debra Bowen	Dem	
29th	Bob Margett	Rep	
30th	Martha Escutia	Dem	
31st	Jim Brulte	Rep	
32nd	Nell Soto	Dem	
33rd	Dick Ackerman	Rep	
34th	Joe Dunn	Dem	
35th	Ross Johnson	Rep	
36th	Ray Haynes	Rep	
37th	Jim Battin	Rep	
38th	Bill Morrow	Rep	
39th	Dede Alpert	Dem	
40th	Steve Peace	Dem	

=== Assembly ===
Democrats: 50
Republicans: 30

=== Officers ===
- Speaker Herb Wesson (D-47) from February 6, 2002
  - Robert Hertzberg (D-40) to February 6, 2002
- Speaker pro Tempore Fred Keeley (D-27)
- Assistant Speaker pro Tempore Christine Kehoe (D-76)
- Majority Floor Leader Kevin Shelley (D-12)
- Minority Floor Leader Dave Cox (R-5) from March 26, 2001
  - Bill Campbell (R-71) to March 26, 2001
- Chief Clerk E. Dotson Wilson
- Sergeant at Arms Ronald Pane

Note: The Chief Clerk and the Sergeant at Arms are not Members of the Legislature

=== Full list of members, 2001-2002 ===
District	Name	Party	Notes
1	Virginia Strom-Martin	Dem	
2	Richard L. Dickerson	Rep	
3	Samuel M. Aanestad	Rep	
4	Tim Leslie	Rep	
5	Dave Cox	Rep	
6	Joseph Nation	Dem	
7	Pat Wiggins	Dem	
8	Helen Thomson	Dem	
9	Darrell Steinberg	Dem	
10	Anthony Pescetti	Rep	
11	Joseph Canciamilla	Dem	
12	Kevin Shelley	Dem	
13	Carole Migden	Dem	
14	Dion Aroner	Dem	
15	Lynne C. Leach	Rep	
16	Wilma Chan	Dem	
17	Barbara S. Matthews	Dem	
18	Ellen M. Corbett	Dem	
19	Louis J. Papan	Dem	
20	John A. Dutra	Dem	
21	S. Joseph Simitian	Dem	
22	Elaine Alquist	Dem	
23	Manny Diaz	Dem	
24	Rebecca Cohn	Dem	
25	Dave Cogdill	Rep	
26	Dennis Cardoza	Dem	
27	Fred Keeley	Dem	
28	Simon Salinas	Dem	
29	Mike Briggs	Rep	
30	Dean Florez	Dem	
31	Sarah Reyes	Dem	
32	Roy Ashburn	Rep	
33	Abel Maldonado	Rep	
34	Phil Wyman	Rep	
35	Hannah-Beth Jackson	Dem	
36	George Runner	Rep	
37	Tony Strickland	Rep	
38	Keith Richman	Rep	
39	Tony Cardenas	Dem	
40	Robert M. Hertzberg	Dem	
41	Fran Pavley	Dem	
42	Paul Koretz	Dem	
43	Dario Frommer	Dem	
44	Carol Liu	Dem	
45	Jackie Goldberg	Dem	
46	Gil Cedillo	Dem	
47	Herb Wesson	Dem	
48	Roderick Wright	Dem	
49	Gloria Romero	Dem	Elected to State Senate on March 6, 2001.
49	vacant		
49	Judy Chu	Dem	Elected on May 15, 2001.
50	Marco Antonio Firebaugh	Dem	
51	Jerome Horton	Dem	
52	Carl Washington	Dem	
53	George Nakano	Dem	
54	Alan Lowenthal	Dem	
55	Jenny Oropeza	Dem	
56	Sally Havice	Dem	
57	Edward Chavez	Dem	
58	Thomas M. Calderon	Dem	
59	Dennis Mountjoy	Rep	
60	Robert Pacheco	Rep	
61	Gloria Negrete McLeod	Dem	
62	John Longville	Dem	
63	Bill Leonard	Rep	
64	Rod Pacheco	Rep	
65	vacant		Vacant due to member-elect Jan Leja not taking seat after pleading guilty to campaign finance violations.
65	Russ Bogh	Rep	Elected on April 3, 2001.
66	Dennis Hollingsworth	Rep	
67	Tom Harman	Rep	
68	Ken Maddox	Rep	
69	Lou Correa	Dem	
70	John Campbell	Rep	
71	Bill Campbell	Rep	
72	Lynn Daucher	Rep	
73	Patricia C. Bates	Rep	
74	Mark Wyland	Rep	
75	Charlene Zettel	Rep	
76	Christine Kehoe	Dem	
77	Jay La Suer	Rep	
78	Howard Wayne	Dem	
79	Juan Vargas	Dem	
80	Dave Kelley	Rep	

Analysis of Bills

== See also ==
- List of California state legislatures
