= California State Legislature, 1999–2000 session =

1999–2000 session of the California State Legislature
←	1997–1998	2001–2002	→
- The Seal of California

Overview
- Legislative body: California State Legislature
- Jurisdiction: California
- Term: December 7, 1998 – November 30, 2000

Senate
- Members: 40
- President of the Senate: Gray Davis (D) Dec. 7, 1998–Jan. 4, 1999; Cruz Bustamante (D) Jan. 4, 1999–Nov. 30, 2000
- President pro tempore: John L. Burton (D–3rd)
- Minority Leader: Ross Johnson (R–35th) Dec. 7, 1998–Apr. 27, 2000; Jim Brulte (R–31st) Apr. 27, 2000–Nov. 30, 2000
- Party control: Democratic

Assembly
- Members: 80
- Speaker: Antonio Villaraigosa (D–45th) Dec. 7, 1998–Apr. 13, 2000; Robert Hertzberg (D–40th) Apr. 13, 2000–Nov. 30, 2000
- Minority Leader: Rod Pacheco (R–64th) Dec. 7, 1998–Apr. 6, 1999; Scott Baugh (R–67th) Apr. 6, 1999–Nov. 9, 2000; Bill Campbell (R–71st) Nov. 9, 2000–Nov. 30, 2000
- Party control: Democratic

The 1999–2000 session was a session of the California State Legislature.

== Members ==
- Skip to Assembly, below

=== Senate ===
Democrats: 25
Republicans: 15

The party affiliation and district numbers of Senators are listed after their names in this list.

President Pro Tem: John L. Burton (D-3)
Majority Leader: Richard Polanco (D-22)
Minority Leader: Ross Johnson (R-35) to April 27, 2000; Jim Brulte (R-31) from April 27, 2000

District	Name	Party
1st	Tim Leslie	Rep
2nd	Wesley Chesbro	Dem
3rd	John Burton	Dem
4th	Maurice Johannessen	Rep
5th	Patrick Johnston	Dem
6th	Deborah Ortiz	Dem
7th	Richard K. Rainey	Rep
8th	Jackie Speier	Dem
9th	Don Perata	Dem
10th	Liz Figueroa	Dem
11th	Byron Sher	Dem
12th	Dick Monteith	Rep
13th	John Vasconcellos	Dem
14th	Chuck Poochigian	Rep
15th	Bruce McPherson	Rep
16th	Jim Costa	Dem
17th	William J. "Pete" Knight	Rep
18th	Jack O'Connell	Dem
19th	Cathie Wright	Rep
20th	Richard Alarcón	Dem
21st	Adam Schiff	Dem
22nd	Richard Polanco	Dem
23rd	Tom Hayden	Dem
24th	Hilda Solis	Dem
25th	Teresa Hughes	Dem
26th	Kevin Murray	Dem
27th	Betty Karnette	Dem
28th	Debra Bowen	Dem
29th	Dick Mountjoy	Rep
30th	Martha Escutia	Dem
31st	Jim Brulte	Rep
32nd	Joe Baca	Dem
33rd	John Lewis	Rep
34th	Joe Dunn	Dem
35th	Ross Johnson	Rep
36th	Ray Haynes	Rep
37th	David G. Kelley	Rep
38th	Bill Morrow	Rep
39th	Dede Alpert	Dem
40th	Steve Peace	Dem

=== Assembly ===
Democrats: 50
Republicans: 29

=== Officers ===
- Speaker Antonio Villaraigosa (D-45)
- Speaker pro Tempore Fred Keeley (D-27)
- Majority Floor Leader Kevin Shelley (D-12)
- Minority Floor Leader Scott Baugh (R-67) from April 6, 1999
  - Rod Pacheco (R-64) to April 6, 1999
- Chief Clerk E. Dotson Wilson
- Sergeant at Arms Ronald Pane

Note: The Chief Clerk and the Sergeant at Arms are not Members of the Legislature

== See also ==
- List of California state legislatures
