= California State Legislature, 2011–2012 session =

2011–12 session of the California State Legislature
←	2009–2010	2013–2014	→
- The Seal of California

Overview
- Legislative body: California State Legislature
- Jurisdiction: California
- Term: December 6, 2010 – November 30, 2012

Senate
- Members: 40
- President of the Senate: Abel Maldonado (R) Dec. 6, 2010 – Jan. 10, 2011; Gavin Newsom (D) Jan. 10, 2011 – Nov. 30, 2012
- President pro tempore: Darrell Steinberg (D–6th); Dec. 6, 2010 – Nov. 30, 2012
- Minority Leader: Robert Dutton (R–31st) Dec. 6, 2010 – Jan. 5, 2012; Bob Huff (R–29th) Jan. 5, 2012 – Nov. 30, 2012
- Party control: Democratic

Assembly
- Members: 80
- Speaker: John Pérez (D–46th); Dec. 6, 2010 – Nov. 30, 2012
- Minority Leader: Connie Conway (R–34th); Dec. 6, 2010 – Nov. 30, 2012
- Party control: Democratic

The 2011–12 session was a session of the California State Legislature. The session first convened on December 6, 2010, and adjourned sine die on November 30, 2012.

== Major events ==
=== Vacancies and special elections ===
- July 13, 2010: Senator Dave Cox (R–1st) dies from prostate cancer
- October 20, 2010: Senator Jenny Oropeza (D–28th) dies of complications from a blood clot. Despite her death, she wins re-election, thus prolonging the seat's vacancy and necessitating a special election
- December 21, 2010: Senator George Runner (R–17th) resigns after his election to the State Board of Equalization
- January 4, 2011: Assemblyman Ted Gaines (R–4th) wins the special election for the 1st Senate District seat to replace Cox and is sworn in on January 6
- January 10, 2011: Mayor Gavin Newsom (D–San Francisco) is sworn in as Lieutenant Governor (and Senate President), replacing Abel Maldonado
- February 15, 2011: Former Assemblywoman Sharon Runner (R–36th) wins the special election for the 17th Senate District seat to replace George Runner and is sworn in on February 18
- February 15, 2011: Former Assemblyman Ted Lieu (D–53rd) wins the special election for the 28th Senate District seat to replace Oropeza and is sworn in on February 18
- May 3, 2011: Beth Gaines (R–Roseville) wins the special election for the 4th Assembly District seat to replace Ted Gaines and is sworn in on May 12
- September 1, 2012: Doug LaMalfa (R–4th) resigned to run for Congress

=== Leadership changes ===
- January 5, 2012: Senator Bob Huff (R–29th) replaces Senator Bob Dutton (R–31st) as Senate Republican Leader, as Dutton is termed out at the end of the term

=== Party changes ===
- March 28, 2012: Assemblyman Nathan Fletcher (R–75th) leaves the Republican Party to become an independent

== Senate ==
Composition of the California State Senate Democratic Party Republican Party Vacancy

Composition
1. 25 Democrats (62.5%)
2. 1 Vacancy (2.50%)
3. 14 Republicans (35.0%)

Affiliation	Party (Shading indicates majority caucus)		Total	
Affiliation	Democratic	Republican	Total	Vacant
End of previous legislature	24	14	38	2
Begin	24	14	38	2
December 21, 2010	24	13	37	3
January 6, 2011	24	14	38	2
February 18, 2011	25	15	40	0
September 1, 2011	25	14	39	1
Latest voting share	62.5%	35%		

=== Officers ===
Position	Name	Party	District
Lieutenant Governor	Gavin Newsom	Democratic	
President Pro Tem	Darrell Steinberg	Democratic	6th–Sacramento
Majority leader	Ellen Corbett	Democratic	10th–San Leandro
Majority caucus chair	Kevin de León	Democratic	22nd–Los Angeles
Majority whip	Vacant		
Minority leader	Bob Huff	Republican	29th–Diamond Bar
Minority caucus chair	Tom Harman	Republican	35th–Huntington Beach
Minority whip	Vacant		
Secretary	Greg Schmidt		
Sergeant-at-Arms	Tony Beard, Jr.		

The Secretary and the Sergeant-at-Arms are not members of the Legislature.

=== Members ===
District	Name	Party	Residence	Term-limited?
1	Ted Gaines	Republican	Roseville	
2	Noreen Evans	Democratic	Santa Rosa	
3	Mark Leno	Democratic	San Francisco	
4	Doug LaMalfa	Republican	Richvale	
4	Vacant			
5	Lois Wolk	Democratic	Davis	
6	Darrell Steinberg	Democratic	Sacramento	
7	Mark DeSaulnier	Democratic	Concord	
8	Leland Yee	Democratic	San Francisco	
9	Loni Hancock	Democratic	Berkeley	
10	Ellen Corbett	Democratic	San Leandro	
11	Joe Simitian	Democratic	Palo Alto	Yes
12	Anthony Cannella	Republican	Ceres	
13	Elaine Alquist	Democratic	San Jose	Yes
14	Tom Berryhill	Republican	Modesto	
15	Sam Blakeslee	Republican	San Luis Obispo	
16	Michael Rubio	Democratic	East Bakersfield	
17	George Runner	Republican	Lancaster	
17	Sharon Runner	Republican	Lancaster	
18	Jean Fuller	Republican	Bakersfield	
19	Tony Strickland	Republican	Moorpark	
20	Alex Padilla	Democratic	Los Angeles	
21	Carol Liu	Democratic	La Cañada Flintridge	
22	Kevin de León	Democratic	Los Angeles	
23	Fran Pavley	Democratic	Agoura Hills	
24	Edward Hernández	Democratic	West Covina	
25	Rod Wright	Democratic	Inglewood	
26	Curren Price	Democratic	Inglewood	
27	Alan Lowenthal	Democratic	Long Beach	Yes
28	Ted Lieu	Democratic	Torrance	
29	Bob Huff	Republican	Diamond Bar	
30	Ronald Calderon	Democratic	Montebello	
31	Robert Dutton	Republican	Rancho Cucamonga	Yes
32	Gloria Negrete McLeod	Democratic	Chino	
33	Mimi Walters	Republican	Laguna Niguel	
34	Lou Correa	Democratic	Santa Ana	
35	Tom Harman	Republican	Huntington Beach	Yes
36	Joel Anderson	Republican	Alpine	
37	Bill Emmerson	Republican	Hemet	
38	Mark Wyland	Republican	Carlsbad	
39	Christine Kehoe	Democratic	San Diego	Yes
40	Juan Vargas	Democratic	San Diego	

== Assembly ==
Composition of the California State Assembly Democratic Party Republican Party Independent

Composition
1. 52 Democrats (65.0%)
2. 1 Independent (1.25%)
3. 27 Republicans (33.8%)

Affiliation	Party (Shading indicates majority caucus)			Total	
Affiliation	Democratic	Independent	Republican	Total	Vacant
End of previous legislature	50	1	27	78	2
Begin	52	0	28	80	0
January 6, 2011	52	0	27	79	1
May 12, 2011	52	0	28	80	0
March 28, 2012	52	1	27	80	0
Latest voting share	65.00%	1.25%	33.75%		

=== Officers ===
Position	Name	Party	District
Speaker	John Pérez	Democratic	46th–Los Angeles
Speaker pro tempore	Nora Campos	Democratic	23rd–San Jose
Assistant speaker pro tempore	Fiona Ma	Democratic	12th–San Francisco
Majority floor leader	Toni Atkins	Democratic	76th–San Diego
Assistant majority floor leader	Michael Allen	Democratic	7th–Santa Rosa
Majority caucus chair	Jerry Hill	Democratic	19th–San Mateo
Majority whip	Roger Hernandez	Democratic	57th–West Covina
Minority leader	Connie Conway	Republican	34th–Tulare
Assistant minority floor leader	Curt Hagman	Republican	60th–Chino Hills
Minority caucus chair	Brian Jones	Republican	77th–Santee
Assistant minority leader	Steve Knight	Republican	36th–Palmdale
Chief minority whips	Dan Logue	Republican	3rd–Linda
Chief minority whips	Kristin Olsen	Republican	25th–Modesto
Chief Clerk	E. Dotson Wilson		
Sergeant-at-Arms	Ronald Pane		

The Chief Clerk and the Sergeant-at-Arms are not members of the Legislature.

=== Members ===
District	Name	Party	Residence	Term-limited?
1	Wesley Chesbro	Democratic	Arcata	
2	Jim Nielsen	Republican	Gerber	
3	Daniel Logue	Republican	Linda	
4	Ted Gaines	Republican	Roseville	Yes
4	Beth Gaines	Republican	Roseville	
5	Richard Pan	Democratic	Sacramento	
6	Jared Huffman	Democratic	San Rafael	Yes
7	Michael Allen	Democratic	Santa Rosa	
8	Mariko Yamada	Democratic	Davis	
9	Roger Dickinson	Democratic	Sacramento	
10	Alyson Huber	Democratic	El Dorado Hills	
11	Susan Bonilla	Democratic	Concord	
12	Fiona Ma	Democratic	San Francisco	Yes
13	Tom Ammiano	Democratic	San Francisco	
14	Nancy Skinner	Democratic	Berkeley	
15	Joan Buchanan	Democratic	Alamo	
16	Sandré Swanson	Democratic	Alameda	Yes
17	Cathleen Galgiani	Democratic	Livingston	Yes
18	Mary Hayashi	Democratic	Hayward	Yes
19	Jerry Hill	Democratic	San Mateo	
20	Bob Wieckowski	Democratic	Fremont	
21	Rich Gordon	Democratic	Menlo Park	
22	Paul Fong	Democratic	Cupertino	
23	Nora Campos	Democratic	San Jose	
24	Jim Beall	Democratic	San Jose	Yes
25	Kristin Olsen	Republican	Modesto	
26	Bill Berryhill	Republican	Ceres	
27	Bill Monning	Democratic	Carmel	
28	Luis Alejo	Democratic	Watsonville	
29	Linda Halderman	Republican	Fresno	
30	David Valadao	Republican	Hanford	
31	Henry Perea	Democratic	Fresno	
32	Shannon Grove	Republican	Bakersfield	
33	Katcho Achadjian	Republican	Arroyo Grande	
34	Connie Conway	Republican	Tulare	
35	Das Williams	Democratic	Santa Barbara	
36	Steve Knight	Republican	Palmdale	
37	Jeff Gorell	Republican	Camarillo	
38	Cameron Smyth	Republican	Santa Clarita	
39	Felipe Fuentes	Democratic	Sylmar	Yes
40	Bob Blumenfield	Democratic	Woodland Hills	
41	Julia Brownley	Democratic	Santa Monica	Yes
42	Mike Feuer	Democratic	Los Angeles	Yes
43	Mike Gatto	Democratic	Los Angeles	
44	Anthony Portantino	Democratic	La Cañada Flintridge	Yes
45	Gil Cedillo	Democratic	Los Angeles	Yes
46	John Pérez	Democratic	Los Angeles	
47	Holly Mitchell	Democratic	Los Angeles	
48	Mike Davis	Democratic	Los Angeles	Yes
49	Mike Eng	Democratic	Monterey Park	Yes
50	Ricardo Lara	Democratic	Bell Gardens	
51	Steven Bradford	Democratic	Gardena	
52	Isadore Hall, III	Democratic	Compton	
53	Betsy Butler	Democratic	Marina del Rey	
54	Bonnie Lowenthal	Democratic	Long Beach	
55	Warren Furutani	Democratic	Long Beach	
56	Tony Mendoza	Democratic	Artesia	Yes
57	Roger Hernandez	Democratic	West Covina	
58	Charles Calderon	Democratic	Whittier	Yes
59	Tim Donnelly	Republican	Twin Peaks	
60	Curt Hagman	Republican	Chino Hills	
61	Norma Torres	Democratic	Pomona	
62	Wilmer Carter	Democratic	Rialto	
63	Mike Morrell	Republican	Rancho Cucamonga	
64	Brian Nestande	Republican	Palm Desert	
65	Paul Cook	Republican	Yucca Valley	Yes
66	Kevin Jeffries	Republican	Lake Elsinore	Yes
67	Jim Silva	Republican	Huntington Beach	Yes
68	Allan Mansoor	Republican	Costa Mesa	
69	Jose Solorio	Democratic	Santa Ana	Yes
70	Donald P. Wagner	Republican	Irvine	
71	Jeff Miller	Republican	Corona	
72	Chris Norby	Republican	Fullerton	
73	Diane Harkey	Republican	Dana Point	
74	Martin Garrick	Republican	Carlsbad	Yes
75	Nathan Fletcher	Republican	San Diego	
75	Nathan Fletcher	Independent	San Diego	
76	Toni Atkins	Democratic	San Diego	
77	Brian Jones	Republican	Santee	
78	Marty Block	Democratic	San Diego	
79	Ben Hueso	Democratic	San Diego	
80	V. Manuel Perez	Democratic	Coachella	

== See also ==
- List of California state legislatures
