= California State Legislature, 2009–2010 session =

2009–10 session of the California State Legislature
| ← | 2007–2008 | 2011–2012 | → |
- The Seal of California

Overview
- Legislative body: California State Legislature
- Jurisdiction: California
- Term: December 1, 2008 – November 30, 2010

Senate
- Members: 40
- President of the Senate: John Garamendi (D) Dec. 1, 2008–Nov. 5, 2009; Abel Maldonado (R) Apr. 27, 2010–Nov. 30, 2010
- President pro tempore: Darrell Steinberg (D–6th)
- Minority Leader: Dave Cogdill (R–14th) Dec. 1, 2008–Feb. 18, 2009; Dennis Hollingsworth (R–36th) Feb. 18, 2009–Oct. 11, 2010; Bob Dutton (R–31st) Oct. 11, 2010–Nov. 30, 2010
- Party control: Democratic

Assembly
- Members: 80
- Speaker: Karen Bass (D–47th) Dec. 1, 2008–Mar. 1, 2010; John Pérez (D–46th) Mar. 1, 2010–Nov. 30, 2010
- Minority Leader: Michael Villines (R–29th) Dec. 1, 2008–Jun. 1, 2009; Sam Blakeslee (R–33rd) Jun. 1, 2009–Feb. 1, 2010; Martin Garrick (R–74th) Feb. 1, 2010–Nov. 30, 2010
- Party control: Democratic

The 2009–10 session was a meeting of the California State Legislature.

== Dates of sessions ==
Convene: December 1, 2008
Adjourn: November 30, 2010

== Major events ==
=== Vacancies and special elections ===
- November 30, 2008: Senator Mark Ridley-Thomas (D-26) resigns to take a seat on the Los Angeles County Board of Supervisors
- May 19, 2009: Assemblyman Curren Price (D-51) wins the special election for the 26th Senate District seat to replace Ridley-Thomas and is sworn in on June 8
- September 1, 2009: Councilman Steven Bradford (D-Gardena) wins the special election for the 51st Assembly District seat to replace Price and is sworn in on September 10
- September 9, 2009: Assemblyman Michael D. Duvall (R-72) resigns in the wake of a lobbyist sex scandal
- November 5, 2009: Lieutenant Governor (and Senate President) John Garamendi resigns to take a seat in the United States House of Representatives
- November 30, 2009: Senator John J. Benoit (R-37) resigns to take a seat on the Riverside County Board of Supervisors
- January 5, 2010: Assemblyman Paul Krekorian (D-43) resigns to take a seat on the Los Angeles City Council
- January 12, 2010: Supervisor Chris Norby (R-Fullerton) wins the special election for the 72nd Assembly District seat to replace Duvall and is sworn in on January 29
- April 27, 2010: Senator Abel Maldonado (R-15) resigns his Senate seat to become Lieutenant Governor to replace Garamendi
- June 8, 2010: Assemblyman Bill Emmerson (R-63) wins the special election for the 37th Senate District seat to replace Benoit and is sworn in on June 9
- June 8, 2010: Attorney Mike Gatto (D-Silver Lake) wins the special election for the 43rd Assembly District seat to replace Krekorian and is sworn in on June 10
- July 13, 2010: Senator Dave Cox (R-1) dies from prostate cancer
- August 17, 2010: Assemblyman Sam Blakeslee (R-33) wins the special election for the 15th Senate District seat to replace Maldonado and is sworn in on August 23
- October 20, 2010: Senator Jenny Oropeza (D-28) dies of complications from a blood clot

=== Leadership changes ===
- February 18, 2009: Senator Dennis Hollingsworth (R-36) replaces Senator Dave Cogdill (R-14) as Senate Republican Leader
- June 1, 2009: Assemblyman Sam Blakeslee (R-33) replaces Assemblyman Mike Villines (R-29) as Assembly Republican Leader
- February 1, 2010: Assemblyman Martin Garrick (R-74) replaces Assemblyman Sam Blakeslee (R-33) as Assembly Republican Leader, as Blakeslee is termed out at the end of the term
- March 1, 2010: Assemblyman John Pérez (D-46) replaces Assemblywoman Karen Bass (D-47) as Speaker of the Assembly, as Bass is termed out at the end of the term
- October 11, 2010: Senator Bob Dutton (R-31) replaces Senator Dennis Hollingsworth (R-36) as Senate Republican Leader, as Hollingsworth is termed out at the end of the term

=== Party changes ===
- June 22, 2009: Assemblyman Juan Arambula (D-31) leaves the Democratic Party to become an independent

== Members ==
- Skip to Assembly, below

=== Senate ===
Composition of the California State Senate Democratic Party Republican Party Vacancy

Democrats: 24
Republicans: 14
Vacancies: 2

| Affiliation | Party (Shading indicates majority caucus) | | Total | |
| Affiliation | Democratic | Republican | Total | Vacant |
|---|---|---|---|---|
| End of previous legislature | 25 | 15 | 40 | 0 |
| Begin | 24 | 15 | 39 | 1 |
| June 8, 2009 | 25 | 15 | 40 | 0 |
| November 30, 2009 | 25 | 14 | 39 | 1 |
| April 27, 2010 | 25 | 13 | 38 | 2 |
| June 9, 2010 | 25 | 14 | 39 | 1 |
| July 13, 2010 | 25 | 13 | 38 | 2 |
| August 23, 2010 | 25 | 14 | 39 | 1 |
| October 20, 2010 | 24 | 14 | 38 | 2 |
| Latest voting share | 63.2% | 36.8% | | |

=== Officers ===
- President Pro Tem: Darrell Steinberg (D-Sacramento)
- Majority Leader: Dean Florez (D-Shafter)
- Minority Leader: Bob Dutton (R-Rancho Cucamonga) from October 11, 2010
  - Dennis Hollingsworth (R-Murrieta) from February 18, 2009, to October 11, 2010
  - Dave Cogdill (R-Modesto) to February 18, 2009
- Secretary: Greg Schmidt
- Sergeant at Arms: Tony Beard, Jr.

Note: The Secretary and the Sergeant at Arms are not Members of the Legislature

=== Full list of members, 2009–2010 ===
| District | Name | Party | Residence | Term- Limited? |
|---|---|---|---|---|
| 1 | Dave Cox | Rep | Fair Oaks | |
| 1 | Vacant | | | |
| 2 | Pat Wiggins | Dem | Santa Rosa | |
| 3 | Mark Leno | Dem | San Francisco | |
| 4 | Sam Aanestad | Rep | Grass Valley | Yes |
| 5 | Lois Wolk | Dem | Davis | |
| 6 | Darrell Steinberg | Dem | Sacramento | |
| 7 | Mark DeSaulnier | Dem | Concord | |
| 8 | Leland Yee | Dem | San Francisco | |
| 9 | Loni Hancock | Dem | Berkeley | |
| 10 | Ellen M. Corbett | Dem | San Leandro | |
| 11 | Joe Simitian | Dem | Palo Alto | |
| 12 | Jeff Denham | Rep | Merced | Yes |
| 13 | Elaine Alquist | Dem | San Jose | |
| 14 | Dave Cogdill | Rep | Modesto | |
| 15 | Abel Maldonado | Rep | Santa Maria | |
| 15 | Sam Blakeslee | Rep | San Luis Obispo | |
| 16 | Dean Florez | Dem | Shafter | Yes |
| 17 | George Runner | Rep | Lancaster | |
| 18 | Roy Ashburn | Rep | Bakersfield | Yes |
| 19 | Tony Strickland | Rep | Moorpark | |
| 20 | Alex Padilla | Dem | Los Angeles | |
| 21 | Carol Liu | Dem | La Cañada Flintridge | |
| 22 | Gil Cedillo | Dem | Los Angeles | Yes |
| 23 | Fran Pavley | Dem | Agoura Hills | |
| 24 | Gloria Romero | Dem | East Los Angeles | Yes |
| 25 | Rod Wright | Dem | Inglewood | |
| 26 | Curren D. Price, Jr. | Dem | Inglewood | |
| 27 | Alan Lowenthal | Dem | Long Beach | |
| 28 | Jenny Oropeza | Dem | Long Beach | |
| 28 | Vacant | | | |
| 29 | Bob Huff | Rep | Diamond Bar | |
| 30 | Ronald S. Calderon | Dem | Montebello | |
| 31 | Robert Dutton | Rep | Rancho Cucamonga | |
| 32 | Gloria Negrete McLeod | Dem | Chino | |
| 33 | Mimi Walters | Rep | Laguna Niguel | |
| 34 | Lou Correa | Dem | Santa Ana | |
| 35 | Tom Harman | Rep | Huntington Beach | |
| 36 | Dennis Hollingsworth | Rep | Murrieta | Yes |
| 37 | John J. Benoit | Rep | Bermuda Dunes | |
| 37 | Bill Emmerson | Rep | Hemet | |
| 38 | Mark Wyland | Rep | Carlsbad | |
| 39 | Christine Kehoe | Dem | San Diego | |
| 40 | Denise Moreno Ducheny | Dem | San Diego | Yes |

=== Assembly ===
Composition of the California State Assembly Democratic Party Republican Party Independent Vacancy

Democrats: 50
Republicans: 27
Independent: 1
Vacancies: 2

California State Assembly
| Affiliation | Party (Shading indicates majority caucus) | | | Total | |
| Affiliation | Democratic | Independent | Republican | Total | Vacant |
|---|---|---|---|---|---|
| End of previous legislature | 48 | 0 | 32 | 80 | 0 |
| Begin | 51 | 0 | 29 | 80 | 0 |
| May 19, 2009 | 50 | 0 | 29 | 79 | 1 |
| June 23, 2009 | 49 | 1 | 29 | 79 | 1 |
| September 9, 2009 | 49 | 1 | 28 | 78 | 2 |
| September 10, 2009 | 50 | 1 | 28 | 79 | 1 |
| January 5, 2010 | 49 | 1 | 28 | 78 | 2 |
| January 29, 2010 | 49 | 1 | 29 | 79 | 1 |
| June 9, 2010 | 49 | 1 | 28 | 78 | 2 |
| June 10, 2010 | 50 | 1 | 28 | 79 | 1 |
| August 23, 2010 | 50 | 1 | 27 | 78 | 2 |
| Latest voting share | 64.1% | 1.3% | 34.6% | | |

=== Officers ===
- Speaker: John Pérez (D-Los Angeles) from March 1, 2010
  - Karen Bass (D-Los Angeles) to March 1, 2010
- Speaker pro Tempore: Fiona Ma (D-San Francisco) from March 18, 2010
  - Lori Saldaña (D-San Diego) to March 18, 2010
- Assistant Speaker Pro Tempore: Isadore Hall, III (D-Compton)
- Majority Floor Leader: Charles Calderon (D-Montebello) from March 18, 2010
  - Alberto Torrico (D-Newark) to March 18, 2010
- Minority Floor Leader: Martin Garrick (R-Carlsbad) from February 1, 2010
  - Sam Blakeslee (R-San Luis Obispo) from June 1, 2009, to February 1, 2010
  - Michael Villines (R-Clovis) to June 1, 2009
- Chief Clerk: E. Dotson Wilson
- Sergeant at Arms: Ronald Pane

Note: The Chief Clerk and the Sergeant at Arms are not Members of the Legislature

=== Full List of Members, 2009–2010 ===
| District | Name | Party | Residence | Term- Limited? |
|---|---|---|---|---|
| 1 | Wesley Chesbro | Dem | Arcata | |
| 2 | Jim Nielsen | Rep | Gerber | |
| 3 | Daniel Logue | Rep | Linda | |
| 4 | Ted Gaines | Rep | Roseville | |
| 5 | Roger Niello | Rep | Fair Oaks | Yes |
| 6 | Jared Huffman | Dem | San Rafael | |
| 7 | Noreen Evans | Dem | Santa Rosa | Yes |
| 8 | Mariko Yamada | Dem | Davis | |
| 9 | Dave Jones | Dem | Sacramento | Yes |
| 10 | Alyson Huber | Dem | El Dorado Hills | |
| 11 | Tom Torlakson | Dem | Antioch | Yes |
| 12 | Fiona Ma | Dem | San Francisco | |
| 13 | Tom Ammiano | Dem | San Francisco | |
| 14 | Nancy Skinner | Dem | Berkeley | |
| 15 | Joan Buchanan | Dem | Alamo | |
| 16 | Sandré Swanson | Dem | Alameda | |
| 17 | Cathleen Galgiani | Dem | Livingston | |
| 18 | Mary Hayashi | Dem | Hayward | |
| 19 | Jerry Hill | Dem | San Mateo | |
| 20 | Alberto Torrico | Dem | Newark | Yes |
| 21 | Ira Ruskin | Dem | Redwood City | Yes |
| 22 | Paul Fong | Dem | Cupertino | |
| 23 | Joe Coto | Dem | San Jose | Yes |
| 24 | Jim Beall Jr. | Dem | San Jose | |
| 25 | Tom Berryhill | Rep | Modesto | |
| 26 | Bill Berryhill | Rep | Ceres | |
| 27 | Bill Monning | Dem | Carmel | |
| 28 | Anna M. Caballero | Dem | Salinas | |
| 29 | Michael Villines | Rep | Clovis | Yes |
| 30 | Danny Gilmore | Rep | Hanford | |
| 31 | Juan Arambula | Dem | Fresno | Yes |
| 31 | Juan Arambula | Ind | Fresno | Yes |
| 32 | Jean Fuller | Rep | Bakersfield | |
| 33 | Sam Blakeslee | Rep | San Luis Obispo | Yes |
| 33 | Vacant | | | |
| 34 | Connie Conway | Rep | Tulare | |
| 35 | Pedro Nava | Dem | Santa Barbara | Yes |
| 36 | Steve Knight | Rep | Palmdale | |
| 37 | Audra Strickland | Rep | Moorpark | Yes |
| 38 | Cameron Smyth | Rep | Santa Clarita | |
| 39 | Felipe Fuentes | Dem | Sylmar | |
| 40 | Bob Blumenfield | Dem | Woodland Hills | |
| 41 | Julia Brownley | Dem | Santa Monica | |
| 42 | Mike Feuer | Dem | Los Angeles | |
| 43 | Paul Krekorian | Dem | Burbank | |
| 43 | Mike Gatto | Dem | Los Angeles | |
| 44 | Anthony J. Portantino | Dem | La Cañada Flintridge | |
| 45 | Kevin de León | Dem | Los Angeles | |
| 46 | John Pérez | Dem | Los Angeles | |
| 47 | Karen Bass | Dem | Los Angeles | Yes |
| 48 | Mike Davis | Dem | Los Angeles | |
| 49 | Mike Eng | Dem | Monterey Park | |
| 50 | Hector De La Torre | Dem | South Gate | Yes |
| 51 | Curren D. Price, Jr. | Dem | Inglewood | |
| 51 | Steven Bradford | Dem | Gardena | |
| 52 | Isadore Hall, III | Dem | Compton | |
| 53 | Ted Lieu | Dem | Torrance | Yes |
| 54 | Bonnie Lowenthal | Dem | Long Beach | |
| 55 | Warren Furutani | Dem | Long Beach | |
| 56 | Tony Mendoza | Dem | Artesia | |
| 57 | Edward P. Hernandez | Dem | West Covina | |
| 58 | Charles M. Calderon | Dem | Montebello | |
| 59 | Anthony Adams | Rep | Hesperia | |
| 60 | Curt Hagman | Rep | Chino Hills | |
| 61 | Norma Torres | Dem | Pomona | |
| 62 | Wilmer Carter | Dem | Rialto | |
| 63 | Bill Emmerson | Rep | Redlands | Yes |
| 63 | Vacant | | | |
| 64 | Brian Nestande | Rep | Palm Desert | |
| 65 | Paul Cook | Rep | Yucca Valley | |
| 66 | Kevin Jeffries | Rep | Lake Elsinore | |
| 67 | Jim Silva | Rep | Huntington Beach | |
| 68 | Van Tran | Rep | Costa Mesa | Yes |
| 69 | Jose Solorio | Dem | Santa Ana | |
| 70 | Chuck DeVore | Rep | Irvine | Yes |
| 71 | Jeff Miller | Rep | Corona | |
| 72 | Michael D. Duvall | Rep | Yorba Linda | |
| 72 | Chris Norby | Rep | Fullerton | |
| 73 | Diane Harkey | Rep | Dana Point | |
| 74 | Martin Garrick | Rep | Carlsbad | |
| 75 | Nathan Fletcher | Rep | San Diego | |
| 76 | Lori Saldaña | Dem | San Diego | Yes |
| 77 | Joel Anderson | Rep | El Cajon | |
| 78 | Marty Block | Dem | San Diego | |
| 79 | Mary Salas | Dem | Chula Vista | |
| 80 | Manuel Perez | Dem | Coachella | |

== See also ==
- List of California state legislatures
