= California State Assembly =

Lower house of the California State Legislature

Coordinates: 38°34′35″N 121°29′36″W

- California State Legislature

Type
- Type: Lower house
- Term limits: 6 terms (12 years)

History
- New session started: December 2, 2024

Leadership
- Speaker: Robert Rivas (D) since June 30, 2023
- Speaker pro tempore: Josh Lowenthal (D) since December 2, 2024
- Majority Leader: Cecilia Aguiar-Curry (D) since November 22, 2023
- Minority Leader: Alexandra Macedo (R) since August 3, 2026

Structure
- Seats: 80
- Political groups: Majority: Democratic (60); Minority: Republican (19); Vacant: Vacant (1)
- Length of term: 2 years
- Authority: Article 4, California Constitution
- Salary: $114,877/year + $211 per diem

Elections
- Voting system: Nonpartisan blanket primary
- Last election: November 5, 2024
- Next election: November 3, 2026
- Redistricting: California Citizens Redistricting Commission

Motto
- Legislatorum est justas leges condere ("It is the duty of legislators to enact just laws.")

Meeting place
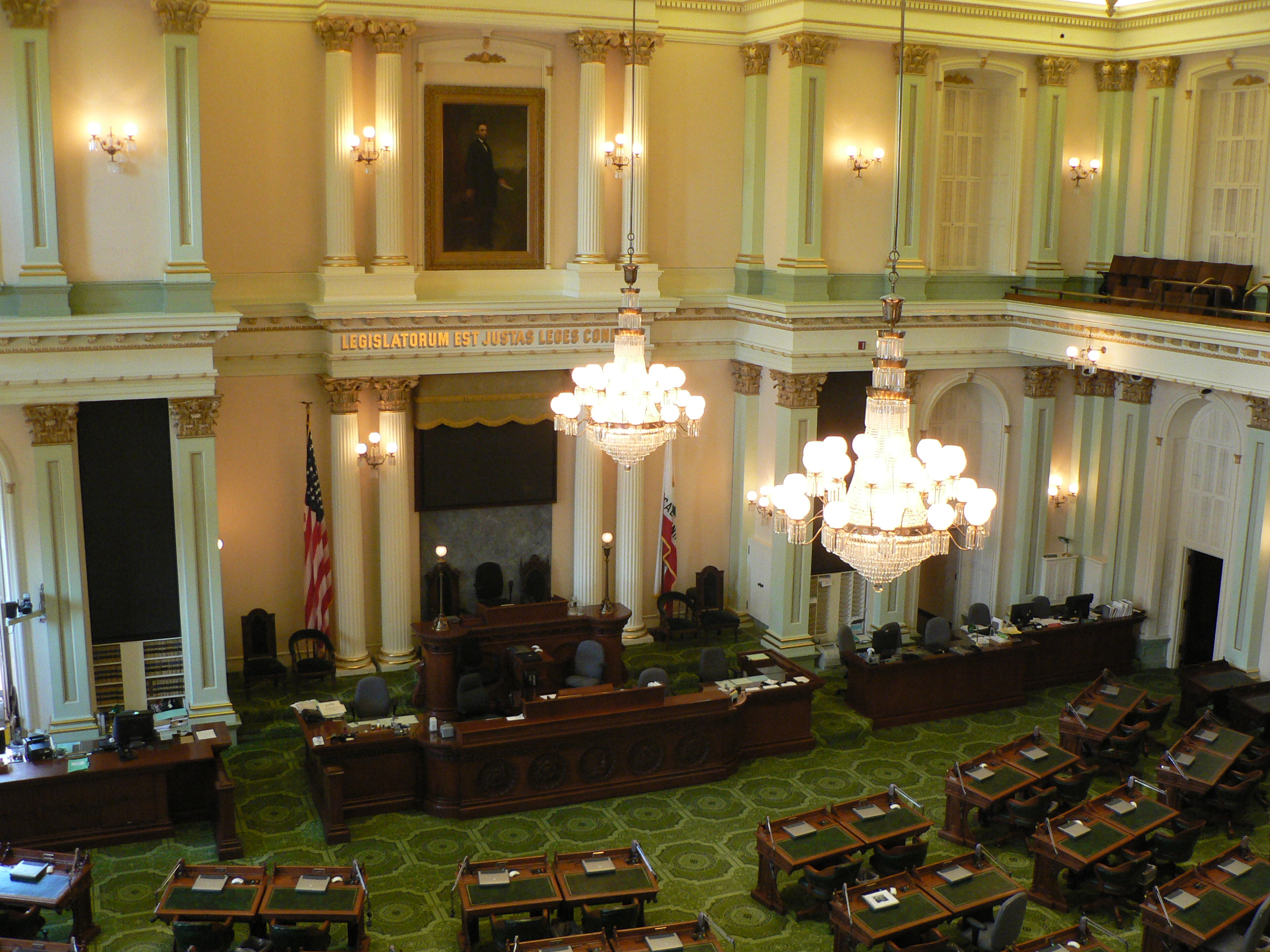
- State Assembly Chamber; California State Capitol; Sacramento, California

Website
- assembly.ca.gov

Rules
- Standing Rules of the Assembly

The California State Assembly is the lower house of the California State Legislature (the upper house being the California State Senate). The Assembly convenes, along with the State Senate, at the California State Capitol in Sacramento.

Neither house has been expanded since the ratification of the 1879 Constitution, and each of the 80 members represent at least 490,000 people, more than any other state lower house.

Members of the California State Assembly are generally referred to using the titles Assemblyman, Assemblywoman, or Assemblymember. In the current legislative session, Democrats have a three-fourths supermajority of 60 seats, while Republicans control a minority of 19 seats.

== Leadership ==
The speaker presides over the State Assembly in the chief leadership position, controlling the flow of legislation and committee assignments. The speaker is nominated by the caucus of the majority party and elected by the full Assembly. Other leaders, such as the majority and minority leaders, are elected by their respective party caucuses according to each party's strength in the chamber.

The current speaker is Democrat Robert Rivas (29th– Hollister). The majority leader is Democrat Cecilia Aguiar-Curry (4th–Winters), while the minority leader is Republican Alexandra Macedo (33rd–Tulare).

== Terms of office ==
Members are allowed, by current term limits, to serve 12 years in the legislature in any combination of four-year State Senate or two-year State Assembly terms. However, members elected to the Legislature prior to 2012 are restricted to three two-year terms (six years). Few, if any, legislators remain from this era, though the restriction could affect future candidates running after a hiatus from office.

Every two years, all 80 seats in the Assembly are subject to election. This is in contrast to the State Senate, in which only half of its 40 seats are subject to election every two years.

== Meeting chamber ==
The chamber's green tones are based on the House of Commons of the United Kingdom. The dais rests along a wall shaped like an "E", with its central projection housing the rostrum. Along the cornice appears a portrait of Abraham Lincoln and a Latin quotation: legislatorum est justas leges condere ("It is the duty of legislators to pass just laws"). Almost every decorating element is identical to the Senate Chamber.

== Candidate qualifications ==
To run for the Assembly, a candidate must be a United States citizen and a registered voter in the district at the time nomination papers are issued, and meet the criteria of the term limits described above. According to Article 4, Section 2(c) of the California Constitution, the candidate must have one year of residency in the legislative district and California residency for three years.

== Employees ==
The chief clerk of the Assembly, a position that has existed since the Assembly's creation, is responsible for many administrative duties. The chief clerk is the custodian of all Assembly bills and records and publishes the Assembly Daily Journal, the minutes of floor sessions, as well as the Assembly Daily File, the Assembly agenda. The chief clerk is the Assembly's parliamentarian, and in this capacity gives advice to the presiding officer on matters of parliamentary procedure. The chief clerk is also responsible for engrossing and enrolling of measures, and the transmission of legislation to the governor.

The Assembly also employs the position of chaplain, a position that has existed in both houses since the first legislative session back in 1850. Currently, the chaplain of the Assembly is Imam Mohammad Yasir Khan, the first chaplain historically that practices Islam.

The position of sergeant-at-arms of the Assembly has existed since 1849; Samuel N. Houston was the first to hold this post, overseeing one deputy. The sergeant-at-arms is mostly tasked with law enforcement duties, but customarily also has a ceremonial and protocol role. Today, some fifty employees are part of the Assembly Sergeant-at-Arms Office.

== Current session ==
=== Composition ===
↓
60	19
Democratic	Republican

Affiliation	Party (Shading indicates majority caucus)		Total	Vacant
Affiliation	Democratic	Republican	Total	Vacant
End of previous legislature	62	17	80	1
Begin (Note: Republican Vince Fong resigned on May 24, 2024, after being elected to the U.S. House of Representatives in a special election. He was re-elected in the 2024 California State Assembly election concurrent with his re-election to the U.S. House of Representatives, but Fong refused to take his seat in the Assembly.)	60	19	79	1
March 3, 2025 (Note: Republican Stan Ellis took office after his election to fill the vacancy left by the resignation of Vince Fong.)	60	20	80	0
April 1, 2025 (Note: Republican Bill Essayli resigned on April 1, 2025, after his nomination as interim United States Attorney for the Central District of California.)	60	19	79	1
September 8, 2025 (Note: Republican Natasha Johnson took office after her election to fill the vacancy left by the resignation of Bill Essayli.)	60	20	80	0
June 9, 2026 (Note: Republican James Gallagher resigned on June 9, 2026, after being elected to the U.S. House.)	60	19	79	1
Latest voting share	75.9%	24.1%		

=== Officers ===
Position	Name	Party	District
Speaker	Robert Rivas	Democratic	29th– Hollister
Speaker pro Tempore	Josh Lowenthal	Democratic	69th– Long Beach
Assistant Speaker pro Tempore	Celeste Rodriguez	Democratic	43rd– San Fernando
Majority Leader	Cecilia Aguiar-Curry	Democratic	4th–Winters
Assistant Majority Leader	Robert Garcia	Democratic	50th–Rancho Cucamonga
Assistant Majority Leader for Policy and Research	LaShae Sharp-Collins	Democratic	79th–San Diego
Majority Whip	Mark Gonzalez	Democratic	54th–Los Angeles
Assistant Majority Whips	Jessica Caloza	Democratic	52nd–Los Angeles
Assistant Majority Whips	Michelle Rodriguez	Democratic	53rd–Pomona
Democratic Caucus Chair	Rick Chavez Zbur	Democratic	51st–Los Angeles
Republican Leader	Alexandra Macedo	Republican	33rd– Tulare
Republican Whip	David Tangipa	Republican	8th– Clovis
Republican Floor Leader	Josh Hoover	Republican	7th–Folsom
Republican Caucus Chair	Natasha Johnson	Republican	63rd–Lake Elsinore
Republican Deputy Leader	Joe Patterson	Republican	5th–Rocklin
Republican Deputy Leader (Fiscal)	Diane Dixon	Republican	72nd– Newport Beach
Republican Deputy Leader (Operations)	Juan Alanis	Republican	22nd–Modesto
Republican Deputy Leader (External Relations)	Laurie Davies	Republican	74th–Laguna Niguel
Chief Clerk	Sue Parker		
Chief Sergeant-at-Arms	Cheryl R. Craft		
Chaplain	Vacant		

The Chief Clerk, the Chief Sergeant-at-Arms, and the Chaplains are not members of the Legislature.

=== List of current representatives ===
District	Name	Party	Residence	Start	Term Limited
1	Heather Hadwick	Republican	Alturas	2024	2036
2	Chris Rogers	Democratic	Santa Rosa	2024	2036
3	Vacant				
4	Cecilia Aguiar-Curry	Democratic	Winters	2016	2028
5	Joe Patterson	Republican	Rocklin	2022	2034
6	Maggy Krell	Democratic	Sacramento	2024	2036
7	Josh Hoover	Republican	Folsom	2022	2034
8	David Tangipa	Republican	Clovis	2024	2036
9	Heath Flora	Republican	Lodi	2016	2028
10	Stephanie Nguyen	Democratic	Elk Grove	2022	2034
11	Lori Wilson	Democratic	Suisun City	2022 (Note: Originally elected in a special election.)	2034
12	Damon Connolly	Democratic	San Rafael	2022	2034
13	Rhodesia Ransom	Democratic	Tracy	2024	2036
14	Buffy Wicks	Democratic	Oakland	2018	2030
15	Anamarie Avila Farias	Democratic	Martinez	2024	2036
16	Rebecca Bauer-Kahan	Democratic	Orinda	2018	2030
17	Matt Haney	Democratic	San Francisco	2022	2034
18	Mia Bonta	Democratic	Alameda	2021	2032
19	Catherine Stefani	Democratic	San Francisco	2024	2036
20	Liz Ortega	Democratic	San Leandro	2022	2034
21	Diane Papan	Democratic	San Mateo	2022	2034
22	Juan Alanis	Republican	Modesto	2022	2034
23	Marc Berman	Democratic	Menlo Park	2016	2028
24	Alex Lee	Democratic	San Jose	2020	2032
25	Ash Kalra	Democratic	San Jose	2016	2028
26	Patrick Ahrens	Democratic	Sunnyvale	2024	2036
27	Esmeralda Soria	Democratic	Fresno	2022	2034
28	Gail Pellerin	Democratic	Santa Cruz	2022	2034
29	Robert Rivas	Democratic	Hollister	2018	2030
30	Dawn Addis	Democratic	Morro Bay	2022	2034
31	Joaquin Arambula	Democratic	Fresno	2016	2028
32	Stan Ellis	Republican	Bakersfield	2025	2036
33	Alexandra Macedo	Republican	Tulare	2024	2036
34	Tom Lackey	Republican	Palmdale	2014	2026
35	Jasmeet Bains	Democratic	Bakersfield	2022	2034
36	Jeff Gonzalez	Republican	Indio	2024	2036
37	Gregg Hart	Democratic	Santa Barbara	2022	2034
38	Steve Bennett	Democratic	Ventura	2020	2032
39	Juan Carrillo	Democratic	Palmdale	2022	2034
40	Pilar Schiavo	Democratic	Santa Clarita	2022	2034
41	John Harabedian	Democratic	Pasadena	2024	2036
42	Jacqui Irwin	Democratic	Thousand Oaks	2014	2026
43	Celeste Rodriguez	Democratic	San Fernando	2024	2036
44	Nick Schultz	Democratic	Burbank	2024	2036
45	James Ramos	Democratic	Highland	2018	2030
46	Jesse Gabriel	Democratic	Encino	2018	2030
47	Greg Wallis	Republican	Bermuda Dunes	2022	2034
48	Blanca Rubio	Democratic	Baldwin Park	2016	2028
49	Mike Fong	Democratic	Alhambra	2022	2034
50	Robert Garcia	Democratic	Rancho Cucamonga	2024	2036
51	Rick Zbur	Democratic	Los Angeles	2022	2034
52	Jessica Caloza	Democratic	Los Angeles	2024	2036
53	Michelle Rodriguez	Democratic	Pomona	2024	2036
54	Mark Gonzalez	Democratic	Los Angeles	2024	2036
55	Isaac Bryan	Democratic	Jefferson Park	2021	2032
56	Lisa Calderon	Democratic	Whittier	2020	2032
57	Sade Elhawary	Democratic	Los Angeles	2024	2036
58	Leticia Castillo	Republican	Home Gardens	2024	2036
59	Phillip Chen	Republican	Yorba Linda	2016	2028
60	Corey Jackson	Democratic	Perris	2022	2034
61	Tina McKinnor	Democratic	Hawthorne	2022	2034
62	Jose Solache	Democratic	Lynwood	2024	2036
63	Natasha Johnson	Republican	Lake Elsinore	2025	2036
64	Blanca Pacheco	Democratic	Downey	2022	2034
65	Mike Gipson	Democratic	Carson	2014	2026
66	Al Muratsuchi (Note: Muratsuchi previously served in the state assembly from 2012–2014.)	Democratic	Rolling Hills Estates	2016	2026
67	Sharon Quirk-Silva (Note: Quirk-Silva previously served in the state assembly from 2012–2014.)	Democratic	Fullerton	2016	2026
68	Avelino Valencia	Democratic	Anaheim	2022	2034
69	Josh Lowenthal	Democratic	Long Beach	2022	2034
70	Tri Ta	Republican	Westminster	2022	2034
71	Kate Sanchez	Republican	Rancho Santa Margarita	2022	2034
72	Diane Dixon	Republican	Newport Beach	2022	2034
73	Cottie Petrie-Norris	Democratic	Irvine	2018	2030
74	Laurie Davies	Republican	Laguna Niguel	2020	2032
75	Carl DeMaio	Republican	Escondido	2024	2036
76	Darshana Patel	Democratic	San Diego	2024	2036
77	Tasha Boerner	Democratic	Encinitas	2018	2030
78	Chris Ward	Democratic	San Diego	2020	2032
79	LaShae Sharp-Collins	Democratic	San Diego	2024	2036
80	David Alvarez	Democratic	San Diego	2022	2034

=== Seating chart ===
					Speaker; R. Rivas
Vacant	Chen	Davies	Dixon	Ta	Lackey	Aguiar-Curry	Ortega	Calderon	Pacheco	Petrie-Norris	Irwin
Castillo	Tangipa	Patterson	Johnson	Sanchez	Flora	Garcia	Gipson	Nguyen	Bains	Bryan	Elhawary
Alanis	J. Gonzalez	Hoover	DeMaio	Wilson	Avila Farias	Rogers	Connolly	Schultz	Haney	Carrillo	M. Rodriguez
Wallis	Hadwick	Caloza	Zbur	Bauer-Kahan	Quirk-Silva	Krell	Pellerin	Fong	Harabedian	Lee	Ward
Macedo	Ellis	McKinnor	Ransom	Bonta	Kalra	Rubio	Solache	Hart	Schiavo	Arambula	Muratsuchi
Sharp-Collins	Jackson	Addis	Boerner	Stefani	Papan	Lowenthal	C. Rodriguez	Bennett	Ahrens	Valencia	Ramos
		Berman	Gabriel	M. Gonzalez	Wicks	R. Rivas	Soria	Alvarez	Patel

== Standing committees ==
Current committees, chairs and vice chairs include:

Committee	Chair	Vice Chair
Aging and Long-Term Care	Patrick Ahrens (D)	Stan Ellis (R)
Agriculture	Esmeralda Soria (D)	Heather Hadwick (R)
Appropriations	Buffy Wicks (D)	Josh Hoover (R)
Arts, Entertainment, Sports, & Tourism	Chris Ward (D)	Tom Lackey (R)
Banking and Finance	Avelino Valencia (D)	Phillip Chen (R)
Budget	Jesse Gabriel (D)	David Tangipa (R)
Business and Professions	Marc Berman (D)	Natasha Johnson (R)
Communications and Conveyance	Tasha Boerner (D)	Josh Hoover (R)
Economic Development, Growth, and Household Impact	Jose Solache (D)	Leticia Castillo (R)
Education	Darshana Patel (D)	Josh Hoover (R)
Elections	Gail Pellerin (D)	Vacant
Emergency Management	Rhodesia Ransom (D)	Heather Hadwick (R)
Environmental Safety and Toxic Materials	Damon Connolly (D)	Stan Ellis (R)
Governmental Organization	Blanca Rubio (D)	Laurie Davies (R)
Health	Mia Bonta (D)	Phillip Chen (R)
Higher Education	Mike Fong (D)	Carl DeMaio (R)
Housing and Community Development	Matt Haney (D)	Joe Patterson (R)
Human Services	Alex Lee (D)	Leticia Castillo (R)
Insurance	Lisa Calderon (D)	Greg Wallis (R)
Judiciary	Ash Kalra (D)	Alexandra Macedo (R)
Labor and Employment	Liz Ortega (D)	Juan Alanis (R)
Local Government	Juan Carrillo (D)	Tri Ta (R)
Military and Veterans Affairs	Pilar Schiavo (D)	Jeff Gonzalez (R)
Natural Resources	Isaac Bryan (D)	Stan Ellis (R)
Privacy and Consumer Protection	Rebecca Bauer-Kahan (D)	Alexandra Macedo (R)
Public Employment and Retirement	Tina McKinnor (D)	Tom Lackey (R)
Public Safety	Nick Schultz (D)	Juan Alanis (R)
Revenue and Taxation	Mike Gipson (D)	Kate Sanchez (R)
Rules	Blanca Pacheco (D)	Tom Lackey (R)
Transportation	Lori Wilson (D)	Laurie Davies (R)
Utilities and Energy	Cottie Petrie-Norris (D)	Joe Patterson (R)
Water, Parks, and Wildlife	Diane Papan (D)	Jeff Gonzalez (R)

== Recent sessions ==
- California State Legislature, 1997–1998 session
- California State Legislature, 1999–2000 session
- California State Legislature, 2001–2002 session
- California State Legislature, 2003–2004 session
- California State Legislature, 2005–2006 session
- California State Legislature, 2007–2008 session
- California State Legislature, 2009–2010 session
- California State Legislature, 2011–2012 session
- California State Legislature, 2013–2014 session
- California State Legislature, 2015–2016 session
- California State Legislature, 2017–2018 session
- California State Legislature, 2019–2020 session
- California State Legislature, 2021–2022 session
- California State Legislature, 2023–2024 session
- California State Legislature, 2025–2026 session

== See also ==
- Impeachment in California
- Bill (proposed law)
- California State Assembly districts
- California State Capitol
- California State Capitol Museum
- California State Legislature
- California State Senate
- Districts in California
- List of California state legislatures
- List of speakers of the California State Assembly
- Members of the California State Legislature
