= List of California state legislatures =

The legislature of the U.S. state of California has convened many times since statehood became effective on September 9, 1850.

== Legislatures ==
| Session | Convened | Adjourned | Last election | Majority |
|---|---|---|---|---|
| California Constitution of 1849 | | | | |
| 1st | December 17, 1849 | April 22, 1850 | 13 de noviembre de 1849 | |
| 2nd | January 6, 1851 | May 1, 1851 | 7 de octubre de 1850 | |
| 3rd | January 5, 1852 | May 4, 1852 | 3 de septiembre de 1851 | |
| 4th | January 3, 1853 | May 19, 1853 | 2 de noviembre de 1852 | |
| 5th | January 4, 1854 | May 15, 1854 | 7 de septiembre de 1853 | |
| 6th | January 1, 1855 | May 7, 1855 | | |
| 7th | January 7, 1856 | April 21, 1856 | | |
| 8th | January 5, 1857 | April 30, 1857 | | |
| 9th | January 4, 1858 | April 26, 1858 | | |
| 10th | January 3, 1859 | April 19, 1859 | | |
| 11th | January 2, 1860 | April 13, 1860 | | |
| 12th | January 7, 1861 | May 20, 1861 | | |
| 13th | January 6, 1862 | May 15, 1862 | | |
| 14th | January 5, 1863 | April 27, 1863 | | |
| 15th | December 7, 1863 | April 4, 1864 | | |
| 16th | December 4, 1865 | April 2, 1866 | | |
| 17th | December 2, 1867 | March 13, 1868 | | |
| 18th | December 6, 1869 | April 4, 1870 | | |
| 19th | December 4, 1871 | April 1, 1872 | | |
| 20th | December 1, 1873 | March 13, 1874 | | |
| 21st | December 6, 1875 | April 3, 1876 | | |
| 22nd | December 3, 1877 | April 1, 1878 | | |
| California Constitution of 1879 | | | | |
| 23rd | January 5, 1880 | April 16, 1880 | | |
| 24th | January 3, 1881 | May 13, 1881 | | |
| 25th | January 8, 1883 | March 13, 1883 | | |
| 26th | January 5, 1885 | March 11, 1885 | | |
| 27th | January 3, 1887 | March 12, 1887 | | |
| 28th | January 7, 1889 | March 16, 1889 | | |
| 29th | January 5, 1891 | March 25, 1891 | | |
| 30th | January 2, 1893 | March 14, 1893 | | |
| 31st | January 7, 1895 | March 16, 1895 | | |
| 32nd | January 4, 1897 | March 13, 1897 | | |
| 33rd | January 2, 1899 | February 10, 1900 | | |
| 34th | January 7, 1901 | March 16, 1901 | | |
| 35th | January 5, 1903 | March 14, 1903 | | |
| 36th | January 2, 1905 | June 12, 1906 | | |
| 37th | January 7, 1907 | November 23, 1907 | | |
| 38th | January 4, 1909 | October 5, 1910 | | |
| 39th | January 2, 1911 | December 24, 1911 | | |
| 40th | January 6, 1913 | May 12, 1913 | | |
| 41st | January 4, 1915 | January 11, 1916 | | |
| 42nd | January 8, 1917 | April 27, 1917 | | |
| 43rd | January 6, 1919 | November 1, 1919 | | |
| 44th | January 3, 1921 | April 29, 1921 | | |
| 45th | January 8, 1923 | May 18, 1923 | | |
| 46th | January 5, 1925 | April 24, 1925 | | |
| 47th | January 3, 1927 | September 4, 1928 | | |
| 48th | January 7, 1929 | May 15, 1929 | | |
| 49th | January 5, 1931 | May 15, 1931 | | |
| 50th | January 2, 1933 | July 28, 1933 | | |
| 51st | January 7, 1935 | Mary 26, 1936 | | |
| 52nd | January 4, 1937 | March 1, 1937 | | |
| 53rd | January 2, 1939 | December 5, 1940 | | |
| 54th | January 6, 1941 | January 22, 1942 | | |
| 55th | January 4, 1943 | June 13, 1944 | | |
| 56th | January 8, 1945 | July 25, 1946 | | |
| 57th | January 6, 1947 | March 27, 1948 | | |
| 1949-50 | January 3, 1949 | September 26, 1950 | | |
| 1951-52 | January 8, 1951 | August 13, 1952 | | |
| 1953-54 | January 5, 1953 | April 1, 1954 | | |
| 1955-56 | January 21, 1955 | April 5, 1956 | | |
| 1957-58 | January 7, 1957 | April 24, 1958 | | |
| 1959-60 | January 5, 1959 | April 7, 1960 | | |
| 1961-62 | January 2, 1961 | June 28, 1962 | | |
| 1963-64 | January 7, 1963 | May 23, 1964 | | |
| 1965-66 | January 4, 1965 | July 8, 1966 | | |
| 1967-68 | January 2, 1967 | September 20, 1968 | | |
| 1969-70 | January 6, 1969 | September 23, 1970 | | |
| 1971-72 | January 4, 1971 | January 5, 1973 | | |
| 1973-74 | January 8, 1973 | November 30, 1974 | | |
| 1975-76 | December 2, 1974 | November 30, 1976 | | |
| 1977-78 | December 6, 1976 | November 30, 1978 | | |
| 1979-80 | December 4, 1978 | November 30, 1980 | | |
| 1981-82 | December 1, 1980 | November 30, 1982 | | |
| 1983-84 | December 6, 1982 | November 30, 1984 | | |
| 1985-86 | December 3, 1984 | November 30, 1986 | | |
| 1987-88 | December 1, 1986 | November 30, 1988 | | |
| 1989-90 | December 1, 1988 | November 30, 1990 | November 1988: Senate | |
| 1991-92 | December 3, 1990 | November 30, 1992 | November 1990: Senate | |
| 1993-94 | December 7, 1992 | November 30, 1994 | November 1992: House, Senate | |
| 1995–96 | December 5, 1994 | November 30, 1996 | November 1994: House, Senate | Democratic Party (Senate)/Republican Party (Assembly) |
| 1997–98 | December 2, 1996 | November 30, 1998 | November 1996: House, Senate | Democratic Party |
| 1999–2000 | December 7, 1998 | November 30, 2000 | November 1998: House, Senate | Democratic Party |
| 2001–02 | December 4, 2000 | November 30, 2002 | November 2000: House, Senate | Democratic Party |
| 2003–04 | December 2, 2002 | November 30, 2004 | November 2002: House, Senate | Democratic Party |
| 2005–06 | December 6, 2004 | November 30, 2006 | November 2004: House, Senate | Democratic Party |
| 2007–08 | December 4, 2006 | August 30, 2008 | November 2006: House, Senate | Democratic Party |
| 2009–10 | December 1, 2008 | November 30, 2010 | November 2008: House, Senate | Democratic Party |
| 2011–12 | December 6, 2010 | November 30, 2012 | November 2010: House, Senate | Democratic Party |
| 2013–14 | December 3, 2012 | November 30, 2014 | November 2012: House, Senate | Democratic Party |
| 2015–16 | December 1, 2014 | November 30, 2016 | November 2014: House, Senate | Democratic Party |
| 2017–18 | December 5, 2016 | November 30, 2018 | November 2016: House, Senate | Democratic Party |
| 2019–20 | December 3, 2018 | September 13, 2019 | November 2018: House, Senate | Democratic Party |
| 2021–22 | December 7, 2020 | November 30, 2022 | November 2020: House, Senate | Democratic Party |
| 2023–24 | | | November 2022: House, Senate | Democratic Party |
| 2025–26 | | | November 5, 2024: House, Senate | Democratic Party |

== See also ==
- List of governors of California
- List of speakers of the California State Assembly
- List of presidents pro tempore of the California State Senate
- Outline of California history
- Lists of United States state legislative sessions
