= O'Neals, California =

Unincorporated community in California, United States

O'Neals
- Unincorporated community
- Location in California O'Neals (the United States)
- Coordinates: 37°7.7′N 119°41.7′W
- Country: United States
- State: California
- County: Madera
- Elevation: 1,309 ft (399 m)

O'Neals is an unincorporated community in Madera County, California, United States. It is located on the Willow Creek, 13 miles (21 km) southeast of Raymond, at an elevation of 1309 feet (399 m).

The O'Neals post office opened in 1887. The name honored Charles O'Neal, merchant and first postmaster. It is the home of Frank Bigelow, elected to represent the California's 5th State Assembly district in the state legislature in 2012.
