= Bob Margett =

American politician (born 1929)

Member of the California Senate from the 29th district
- In office December 4, 2000 – November 30, 2008
- Preceded by: Dick Mountjoy
- Succeeded by: Bob Huff

Member of the California State Assembly from the 59th district
- In office June 7, 1995 – November 30, 2000
- Preceded by: Dick Mountjoy
- Succeeded by: Dennis Mountjoy

Personal details
- Born: May 8, 1929
- Died: October 18, 2023 (aged 94)
- Party: Republican
- Spouse: Beverly Margett (m. 1951–2016)
- Children: 7

Robert G. Margett (May 8, 1929 – October 18, 2023) was an American politician who was a California state senator from 2000 to 2008. He represented the 29th Senate District, which includes parts of Los Angeles, Orange and San Bernardino counties. He is a Republican and served on the Budget and Fiscal Review Committee, Government Organization Committee, Natural Resources and Water Committee, Public Safety Committee and Transportation and Housing Committee.

Formerly a mayor in Arcadia, California, he was first elected to the State Senate in 2000 and was re-elected to represent the 29th Senate District in November 2004. Previously he sat in the State Assembly, representing the 59th District, from 1995 to 2000.

Preceded by Dick Mountjoy	California State Assemblyman; 59th District; June 7, 1995 – November 30, 2000	Succeeded by Dennis Mountjoy
Preceded by Dick Mountjoy	California State Senator; 29th District; December 4, 2000 – November 30, 2008	Succeeded by Bob Huff
