= California Legislative Jewish Caucus =

Bipartisan group of state legislators

The California Legislative Jewish Caucus (CLJC) is a bipartisan, bicameral group of state legislators primarily dedicated to Jewish institutional interests, including pro‑Israel advocacy, promoting Holocaust education and remembrance, countering antisemitism, anti-Zionism and anti-Israel narratives, supporting Israel in schools and college campuses, and strengthening California–Israel economic, technological and cultural ties. As of 2024, the caucus has 19 members—12 in the 80‑member Assembly and 7 in the 40‑member Senate—giving it about 15% of Assembly seats and 17.5% of Senate seats, positioning it as a cohesive bloc that can play an important role in legislative and budget negotiations.

The CLJC was established in 2012, spearheading the California–Israel memorandum of understanding (MOU) in its first major legislative initiative, which noted $4.2 billion in two‐way trade in 2013. It is the first official legislative Jewish caucus in the United States. In its mission statement, the caucus describes itself as “a Jewish voice for justice, equality, and progress…a resource to, and advocate on behalf of, the professional, educational, social, political and cultural concerns of the Jewish Community” and its “top priorities”.

The CLJC employs staff paid through the State Assembly but is not a separate legal entity and has no independent budget or bank account. Its “budget” accomplishments (e.g. $80 million/year for 2024-25) are state funding allocations it successfully advocates for in the annual California Budget Act. The CLJC works in partnership with Jewish Public Affairs Committee of California (JPAC) and has also collaborated with organizations such as the Anti‑Defamation League, the American Jewish Committee, the Simon Wiesenthal Center, and other Jewish and civil‑rights groups.

The CLJC successfully advocated for the incorporation of the IHRA definition of antisemitism in California's K-12 Ethnic Studies Model Curriculum (ESMC), and for the inclusion of what it called “guardrails” in the ethnic studies legislation to “provide clear direction to local school districts and the California Department of Education that anti‑Jewish and anti‑Israel content cannot be included in the teaching of ethnic studies.”

Since 2021, the CLJC's legislative efforts related to Jewish institutional interests and Israel have intensified alongside broader Tikkun Olam themed social-justice programs. The CLJC has been criticized for misleading, unethical, and undemocratic legislation, mostly in support of Israel.

== Founding and early Israel mandate ==
In 2012 Assemblymembers Marty Block, Bob Blumenfield, and Speaker John A. Pérez established the CLJC as the nation's first official legislative Jewish caucus. By 2014 the caucus grew to eight Senators, three Assembly members, and three non‐Jewish associate members—twelve Democrats and two Republicans—while convening the monthly “Capitol Knesset” for Jewish legislators, staff, and advocates to network and discuss policy priorities.

Its first major legislative initiative was spearheading SCR 121 (2014), formally endorsing the California–Israel memorandum of understanding (MOU) signed March 5, 2014, by Governor Jerry Brown and Prime Minister Benjamin Netanyahu, which noted $4.2 billion in two‐way trade in 2013 and committed both parties to:

1. Foster economic cooperation and development
2. Facilitate joint industrial research and development
3. Enhance business relationships, educational exchanges and friendship
4. Convene bilateral public–private partnerships in sectors such as alternative energy, environmental technology, health, and agriculture

By codifying support for the MOU into state resolutions (SCR 121 2014; SCR 25 2015; SB 1376 2016), the CLJC positioned itself as the de facto conduit for California–Israel economic collaboration.

SCR 121 (2014) and SCR 25 (2015) both include the explicit assertion that collaboration with Israel under the California-Israel MOA “will foster peace and democracy in the Middle East”.

=== Holocaust, antisemitism and Israel ===
In a 2018 California State Senate session honoring Israel’s 70th anniversary, organized at the initiative of the California Legislative Jewish Caucus, members and leaders of the caucus explicitly linked the Holocaust and antisemitism to Israel’s role as a refuge for Jews and to the need to ensure a secure State of Israel.

Senator Bill Monning stated that “the establishment of the state of Israel provided refuge for people fleeing persecution, survivors of families who perished in the Holocaust…”.

Caucus co‑chair Scott Wiener said that “this [persecution] has been happening to my community for millennia and it peaked with the Holocaust… the State of Israel is not just another country. For my community the state of Israel, represents the reality we have now that did not exist before—that that is a place where as Jews we are always welcome, we can always go for safety and refuge, because let’s remember what happened before the Holocaust: we could have saved many many Jews from being slaughtered in the Holocaust…. This world bears a responsibility for what it has done to my community, and part of that responsibility is ensuring a viable and secure state of Israel. And that is incredibly important and California should be on record supporting that.“

Senator Henry Stern argued that “when you’re a college student on campus and you’re dealing with antisemitism, that is ostensibly an anti-Israel movement, but really becomes a wedge to divide minority communities against the Jewish community, there is a toxicity that moves through our states that I think we can all resolve and agree has to be stamped out and dealt with.”

== 2015-2017 Modest allocations, anti-BDS legislation ==
In February 2016, CLJC introduced AB 2844, also known as California's anti-BDS law, prohibiting companies from “participating in a boycott of the State of Israel, known as the Boycott, Divestment and Sanctions (BDS) movement”.

- 2015-16 Allocation: The caucus secured $2 million for the Museum of Tolerance's "Tools for Tolerance" K-12 educator training program and expanded the Nonprofit Security Grant Program by $2 million.
- 2016-17 Allocation: The California State Nonprofit Security Grant Program (CSNSGP) allocates $4.5 million to CLJC.

In 2016, CLJC's website symbol hadn't switched to a multi-colored Jewish star and instead featured an Israel flag.

== 2017-2019: JPAC partnership, increased allocations, ethnic studies guardrails ==
During this period, CLJC established a partnership with JPAC (Jewish Public Affairs Committee of California).

- 2017-18 Allocation: $11.7 million. This package added Holocaust-survivor social-service subsidies and broadened hate-crime prevention initiatives, signaling that the caucus could marshal eight-figure support.
- 2018-19 Allocation: The caucus secured $15.3 million funding including $10 million for Museum of Tolerance maintenance, $3.6 million for Holocaust Survivor assistance programs, and other smaller allocations.

During this period CLJC worked to include "guardrails" in the ethnic studies legislation to “provide clear direction to local school districts and the California Department of Education that anti-Jewish and anti-Israel content cannot be included in the teaching of ethnic studies" and to incorporate the IHRA definition of antisemitism in the Ethnic Studies Model Curriculum (ESMC).

== 2019-2020: Substantial allocation surge ==
2019 saw the passage of Assembly Bill 1548, which formally established the California Nonprofit Security Grant Program—legislation that would become a cornerstone of the caucus’s advocacy work in subsequent years.

- 2019-20 Allocation: Surge to $64.3 million, including $15 million to Nonprofit Security Grant Program, $6 million for Holocaust Museum expansion, and $23.5 million for Jewish camp reconstruction after wildfires.

== 2021-Present: Record allocation increase, greater legislative output and broader social justice appeals ==
=== State Budget Allocations ===
2020-21

Pandemic belt-tightening reduced new wins to roughly $31.9 million, but the caucus still protected core Holocaust survivor services and kept security-grant funding flowing even as many discretionary programs were slashed statewide.

The 2021–22 CLJC state budget rebounded with $80 million. It allocated:

- $50 million for the California State Nonprofit Security Grant Program (CSNSGP), providing up to $200,000 per high-risk nonprofit site, including synagogues and other “at-risk” institutions.
- $10 million for the Museum of Tolerance (Simon Wiesenthal Center) to build an interactive antisemitism exhibit on its third floor.
- $5.7 million for Jewish Family Services of Los Angeles (JFSLA) to purchase a permanent Van Nuys site for its SOVA Community Food and Resource Program.
- $2.5 million to expand Holocaust Museum Los Angeles—adding to the $6 million the CLJC had secured in 2019–20 for the same institution.
- $1 million to renovate and preserve the Tauber Holocaust Library operated by JFCS Bay Area.
- $8 million for the Enhanced Services Program for Asylees (ESPA), supporting case management for newly arrived refugees and asylum-seekers through Hebrew Immigrant Aid Society (HIAS).

2022–23

Lawmakers declared a “record year,” locking in $141.2 million across seven projects, including $36 million for a three-year Holocaust Survivor Assistance Program and $40 million to finish camp-rebuild work.

2023–24

Facing a $30 billion deficit, overall caucus wins initially fell to about $24.7 million. Still, $20 million went to a scaled-back security-grant round, and Governor Newsom later added another $20 million in emergency funds after the October 7 attack to nearly double that pool to $44.7 million.

2024–25

The legislature took the unprecedented step of approving a two-year, $160 million commitment — $80 million per year — locking in long-term stability for the security-grant program and adding smaller sums for Holocaust-education consortia and asylum-seeker services

Key elements include:

- $80 million annually for CSNSGP, marking the first multi-year commitment to the program and guaranteeing sustained funding for high-risk nonprofits, houses of worship, LGBTQ+ centers, and reproductive-health clinics.
- $5 million to continue and expand the California Teachers Collaborative on Holocaust and Genocide Education, supporting curriculum development and teacher training across 14 leading institutions.
- $79 million reappropriation for the San Diego Rapid Response Network (SDRRN), enabling Jewish Family Service of San Diego's Asylum-Seeker Shelter and related services to carry over unspent funds into the new fiscal year.

2026

The Jewish Caucus secures historic funding in the state budget. Most notably, the state budget will now include an annual, ongoing appropriation of $80 million for the California State Nonprofit Security Grant Program. The budget also includes $36 million distributed for the Holocaust Survivor Assistance Program.

=== Legislation ===
2021

AB 57 (Gabriel): Implements State Auditor recommendations to improve hate-crime, anti-Semitic and anti-Israel data collection and reporting by law enforcement and the California Department of Justice. Introduced 2021; advanced in Assembly Public Safety Committee.

AB 587 (Gabriel): Requires social-media platforms to publicly disclose content-moderation practices related to hate, disinformation, extremism, harassment, antisemitic, and anti-Israel content. Sponsored by CLJC; supported by ADL, JPAC, AJC, and other groups.

AB 1126 (Bloom): Establishes the California Commission on the State of Hate & Violent Extremism, monitoring anti-Semitic and anti-Israel activity and recommending policies to the Legislature and state agencies.

SB 693 (Stern): Develops and promotes resources for teacher training and curriculum through the creation of the Governor's Council on Genocide and Holocaust Education, which includes the Anti-Defamation League (ADL), Simon Wiesenthal Center (Museum of Tolerance), USC Shoah Foundation, Jewish Family and Children's Services (JFCS) Holocaust Center, Holocaust Museum LA, Facing History and Ourselves, and the Jewish Partisan Educational Foundation (JPEF).

2024

SB 1287 (Glazer): Requires public colleges and universities to update and expand student-conduct codes to prevent behavior defined as harassment, intimidation, violence and discrimination, particularly against pro-Israel students by pro-Palestinian activists.

AB 2925 (Friedman): Requires that any campus that chooses to provide DEI training must include training about anti-Semitic and anti-Israel discrimination against Jews.

AB 3024 (Ward): Stop Hate Littering Act criminalizes distribution of pro-Palestinian and other flyers, posters, or symbols defined as hateful or as being intended to terrorize.

SB 1277 (Stern): Establishes a statewide professional-development program under the Department of Education for grades 7-12: The California Teachers Collaborative for Holocaust and Genocide Education, which includes the Anti-Defamation League (ADL), Simon Wiesenthal Center (Museum of Tolerance), USC Shoah Foundation, Jewish Family and Children's Services (JFCS) Holocaust Center, Holocaust Museum LA, Facing History and Ourselves, and the Jewish Partisan Educational Foundation (JPEF).

2025

AB 715 (Zbur, Addis): Creates a state Antisemitism Prevention Coordinator to monitor K-12 and prohibits historical narratives deemed anti-Israel by the Coordinator. Prohibits accounts that minimize the nature and extent of antisemitic incidents and violence as determined by Pro-Israel organizations. Prohibits comparisons of Israel with Nazi Germany and Jews or Israelis with Nazis. States that language or content which “directly or indirectly questions Israel's right to exist” amounts to discriminatory conduct toward Jewish students. Prohibits “dual loyalty” assertions that American Jews have loyalty to both Israel and the US. Strengthens Uniform Complaint Process.

AB 1468 (Zbur; Addis): Narrows high school ethnic-studies curriculum to a U.S.-only framework, excluding global perspectives on colonialism and Palestine-related education. Introduces new “guardrails”, public-hearing and wait period requirements for every ethnic-studies course and instructional material.

2026

In 2026, the CLJC successfully passed six Senate Bills:

AB 1387 requires state agencies that collect demographic information to include "Jewish" as an option for ethnicity or ancestry. The California State Legislature passed the bill in August 2026 and sent it to Governor Gavin Newsom for consideration. Supporters of the bill argue that the measure would provide better data on Jewish Californians, including their representation in schools and employment.

AB 1853 establishes content standards for candidate statements in official voter information guides and procedures for challenging noncompliant statements. Its development followed controversy over gubernatorial candidate Don Grundmann's statement, which included allegations that Israel was responsible for the September 11 attacks. Supporters described the statement as containing antisemitic conspiracy theories.

AB 2664 establishes restrictions on approaches within a 100-foot radius of an entrance or exit of a house of worship. Within that area, it prohibits intentionally approaching within eight feet of a person seeking to enter or leave, without that person's consent, for purposes including distributing literature, displaying a sign, engaging in oral protest or education, or harassing, obstructing, threatening, or intimidating the person.

Debate over the measure included its potential suppression of pro-Palestinian demonstrations at religious institutions hosting Israel-related political activities. CAIR-CA warned that the law could chill peaceful protests at houses of worship hosting political programs or activities associated with Israeli settlements.

AB 1803 requires covered employers to add an anti-hate-speech component to mandatory workplace harassment-prevention training beginning in 2028, including antisemitism. The training addresses speech targeting characteristics protected by California employment law, including religion, ancestry, and national origin.

AB 1836 expands California's nonprofit security grant program to include qualifying off-site events, such as cultural festivals, religious observances, and public celebrations. Jewish organizations benefit alongside other eligible nonprofits. Its documented purpose is to protect organizations and events at risk of hate-motivated violence, including antisemitism.

AB 395 requires or encourages specified public bodies and educational institutions to consider religious and cultural observances when scheduling activities. Covered observances include Jewish holidays such as Rosh Hashanah, Yom Kippur, and Passover, alongside holidays from other traditions.

=== Broader social justice appeals ===
Since 2021, CLJC's legislative efforts related to Jewish institutional interests and Israel have intensified alongside broader social-justice programs—most visibly its annual Tikkun Olam bill packages, described as a translation of core Jewish values into policy proposals on homelessness, mental health, environmental justice, affordable housing, and algorithmic fairness.

== Membership ==
Membership during the 2025-2026 term.

=== Current ===
==== Officers ====
Position	Officer	party	District
Co-Chair	Scott Wiener	Democrat	Senate District 11
Co-Chair	Jesse Gabriel	Democrat	Assembly district 46
Co-Vice-Chair	Josh Becker	Democrat	Senate District 13
Co-Vice-Chair	Dawn Addis	Democrat	Assembly district 30

==== At large ====
Member	party	District
Patrick Ahrens	Democrat	26th State Assembly district
Ben Allen (Note: Formerly served as vice-chair)	Democrat	Senate District 27
Rebecca Bauer-Kahan	Democrat	16th State Assembly district
Marc Berman	Democrat	23rd State Assembly district (Note: Represented the 24th State Assembly district prior to the 2022 redistricting)
Matt Haney	Democrat	17th State Assembly district
Jacqui Irwin	Democrat	42nd State Assembly district (Note: Represented the 44th State Assembly district prior to the 2022 redistricting)
Maggy Krell	Democrat	6th State Assembly district
Josh Lowenthal	Democrat	69th State Assembly district
Gail Pellerin	Democrat	28th State Assembly district
Blanca Rubio^{★}	Democrat	48th State Assembly district
Susan Rubio^{★}	Democrat	Senate District 22
Henry Stern	Democrat	Senate District 24
Christopher M. Ward	Democrat	78th State Assembly district
Rick Zbur^{★}	Democrat	51st State Assembly district

^{★} Associate member (member is not Jewish)

=== Previous ===
Member	party	District	Years	Notes
Marty Block	Democrat	78th State Assembly district (2008-2012) (Note: Service predates the foundation of the caucus); Senate District 39 (2012-2016)	2012-2016	Chair, Founding member
Richard Bloom	Democrat	50th State Assembly district	2012-2022	Founding member
Bob Blumenfield	Democrat	40th State Assembly district (2008-2012); 45th State Assembly district (2012-2013)	2008-2013	Founding member
Laura Friedman	Democrat	43rd State Assembly district (2016-2022); 44th State Assembly district (2022-2024)	2016-2024	
Steve Glazer	Democrat	Senate District 7	2015-2024	
Robert Hertzberg	Democrat	40th State Assembly district (1996-2002); Senate District 18 (2014-2022)	2014-2022	
Hannah-Beth Jackson	Democrat	35th State Assembly district (1998-2004); Senate District 19 (2012-2020)	2012-2020	
Mark Leno	Democrat	13th State Assembly district (2002-2008); Senate District 3 (2008-2012); Senate District 11 (2012-2016)	2012-2016	
Marc Levine	Democrat	10th State Assembly district	2012-2022	Served as Vice Chair and Chair
Eric Linder^{★}	Republican	60th State Assembly district	2012-2016	
Jose Medina^{★}	Democrat	61st State Assembly district	2012-2022	Founding member
Adrin Nazarian^{★}	Democrat	46th State Assembly district	2012-2022	
Josh Newman	Democrat	Senate District 29	2016-2018, 2020-2024	
John Pérez^{★}	Democrat	46th State Assembly district (2008-2012); 53rd State Assembly district (2012-2014)	2008-2014	Served as Speaker of the Assembly
Darrell Steinberg	Democrat	9th State Assembly district (2008-2012); 53rd State Assembly district (2006-2014)	1998-2004, 2006-2014	Served as Senate President Pro Tem
Jeff Stone	Republican	Senate District 28 (2014-2019)	2014-2017	Resigned membership in the caucus
Tony Thurmond	Democrat	15th State Assembly district	2014-2018	
Lois Wolk	Democrat	8th State Assembly district (2002-2008); Senate District 5 (2008-2012); Senate District 3 (2012-2016)	2012-2016	Founding member

^{★} Associate member (member is not Jewish)

== Criticism ==
CLJC legislation has been criticized by the President of the Council of UC Faculty Associations, California Teachers Association, CAIR and others for stifling criticism of Israel, censoring Palestine and creating a climate of fear.

The Washington Legal Foundation and the U.S. Court of Appeals for the Ninth Circuit concluded that CLJC's AB 587 violates the First Amendment.

CLJC and its co-chair Scott Wiener have been criticized by Jewish Voice for Peace for "twist[ing] criticism [of Israel] into antisemitism" and for opposing a Gaza cease-fire resolution in Sacramento.

CAIR has criticized CLJC for commending California State University Chancellor Mildred García placing Sonoma State University President Mike Lee on leave after Lee announced support for an academic boycott of Israel in agreement with protesters, Students for Justice in Palestine, and the Boycott, Divestment and Sanctions (BDS) movement, which Wiener described as "horrific and wrong".

A Counterpunch article describes CLJC legislation as “designed to protect Israeli apartheid and genocide“.
