= California's 45th district =

California's 45th district may refer to:

- California's 45th congressional district
- California's 45th State Assembly district
