= Ralph W. Wallace =

American politician (1904–1952)

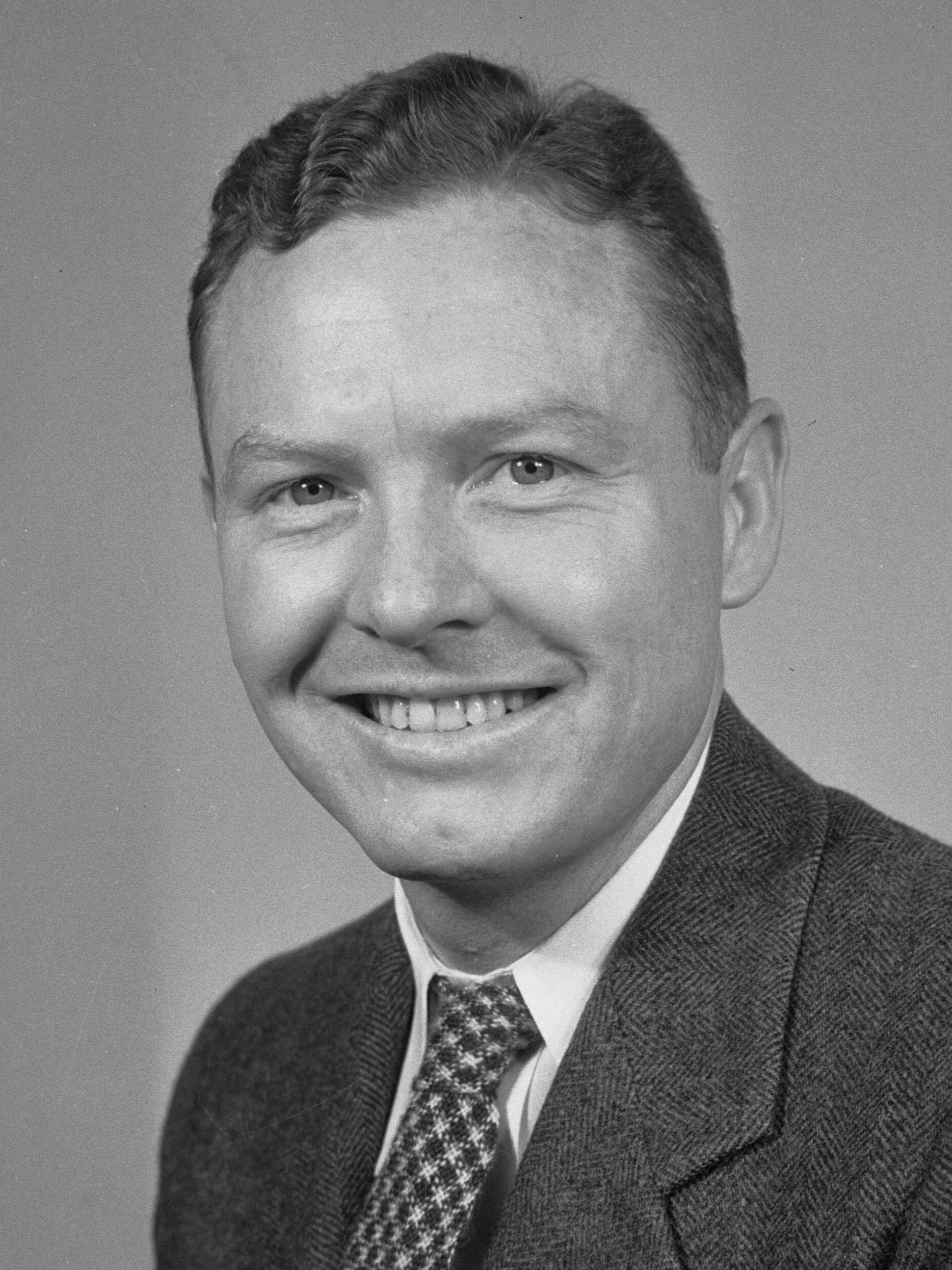
- Wallace in 1936

Member of the California State Assembly from the 78th district
- In office January 7, 1935 – January 4, 1937
- Preceded by: George B. Bowers
- Succeeded by: Jeanette E. Daley

Personal details
- Born: October 30, 1904 New York, U.S.
- Died: December 17, 1952 (aged 48) California, U.S.
- Party: Republican

Military service
- Branch/service: United States Army
- Battles/wars: World War I

Ralph W. Wallace (October 30, 1904 -– December 17, 1952) was a Republican Party member of the California State Assembly for the 78th district from 1935 to 1937. During World War I, he was in the United States Army.
