= Howard Wayne =

American politician (1948–2023)

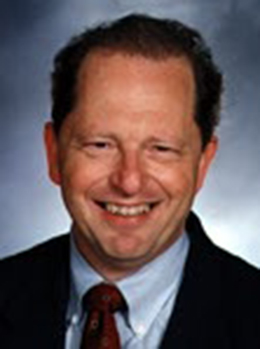
- Official portrait, 1999

Member of the California State Assembly from the 78th district
- In office December 2, 1996 – November 30, 2002
- Preceded by: Dede Alpert
- Succeeded by: Shirley Horton

Personal details
- Born: November 2, 1948 Fresno, California, U.S.
- Died: November 2, 2023 (aged 75)
- Party: Democratic
- Spouse: Mary Lundberg (m. 1988)
- Education: San Diego State University; University of San Diego

Howard Wayne (November 2, 1948 – November 2, 2023) was an American politician who was the Vice Chair, Central Area of the San Diego County Democratic Party. Previously, he served as Democratic politician in the California State Assembly from 1996 until 2002, representing California's 78th State Assembly district.

== Early life and career ==
Wayne received his undergraduate degree from San Diego State University and his juris doctor degree from the University of San Diego School of Law. Prior to his service in the Assembly, Wayne was a Deputy Attorney General for 23 years from 1973 until 1996, focusing on consumer protection and child support cases. Prior to winning his Assembly bid in 1996, Wayne made two unsuccessful bids for the Assembly in 1990, losing the regular primary for the 78th district seat with 12.7% of the vote and losing a bid in a special primary election later that year after obtaining 15.5% of the vote.

== Assembly elections ==
Wayne was elected in 1996 after defeating former Assemblymember Tricia Hunter by a 49% to 45% margin. He was easily reelected by a 57% to 39% margin in 1998 after defeating Jean Roesch, a member of the Coronado Unified School District Board of Education. In 2000, Wayne won his last term over retired surgeon John Steel by a margin of 56% to 38%.

== Post-Assembly career ==
In 2003, he briefly ran for San Diego City Attorney but dropped his bid before the election. He also returned to the Attorney General's office in 2003, serving as an Assistant Attorney General. Wayne originally planned to run for Donna Frye's city council seat had she been elected mayor of San Diego. However, Frye lost the election to Mayor Jerry Sanders. While she was serving out the remainder of her term, Wayne and his wife Mary remained busy, moving to South Africa in 2006 to help assist with that country's growing legal system. They returned to their Clairemont home in 2007. Frye was not able to run again for Council in 2010 due to term limits and Wayne actively campaigned for the District 6 council she vacated. Wayne lost the election to Republican challenger Lorie Zapf by a 5-point margin or 1570 votes.

== Death ==
Howard Wayne died on November 2, 2023, at the age of 75.

Political offices
Preceded by Dede Alpert	California State Assemblymember, 78th District; December 2, 1996 – November 30, 2002	Succeeded by Shirley Horton
