= California's 78th State Assembly district =

American legislative district

Current assemblymember
Chris Ward; D–San Diego
- Population (2010) • Voting age • Citizen voting age: 461,885; 399,987; 352,199
- Demographics: 64.64% White; 4.52% Black; 18.45% Latino; 10.30% Asian; 0.71% Native American; 0.37% Hawaiian/Pacific Islander; 0.41% other; 0.62% remainder of multiracial
- Registered voters: 291,918
- Registration: 47.46% Democratic; 20.41% Republican; 26.33% No party preference

California's 78th State Assembly district is one of 80 California State Assembly districts. It is currently represented by Democrat Chris Ward of San Diego.

== District profile ==
The district takes in a stretch of north-central San Diego County from the San Diego Zoo and Banker's Hill, with the southerly border just north of downtown San Diego, and running north to the Clairemont Mesa and Mira Mesa neighborhoods, and east past Mission Trails Regional Park through San Carlos and Fletcher Hills to the western edges of El Cajon. Over 93% of the district population is in the City of San Diego, with the remainder almost entirely in El Cajon, as of February 2026. Previously, the district was more coastal, from Solana Beach to the Mexican border, including downtown San Diego, beachfront neighborhoods, and the UC San Diego.

San Diego County – 14.9%

- El Cajon – 31.06%
- San Diego – 34.52%

== Election results from statewide races ==
Year	Office	Results
2021	Recall	No 70.2 – 29.8%
2020	President	Biden 71.8 – 25.6%
2018	Governor	Newsom 69.4 – 30.6%
2018	Senator	Feinstein 56.4 – 43.6%
2016	President	Clinton 67.5 – 25.9%
2016	Senator	Harris 68.0 – 32.0%
2014	Governor	Brown 62.7 – 37.3%
2012	President	Obama 63.1 – 34.1%
2012	Senator	Feinstein 65.2 – 34.8%

== List of assembly members representing the district ==
Due to redistricting, the 78th district has been moved around different parts of the state. The current iteration resulted from the 2021 redistricting by the California Citizens Redistricting Commission.

Member	Party	Dates	Electoral history	Counties represented
E. E. Edwards (Los Angeles)	Republican	January 5, 1885 – January 3, 1887	Elected in 1884. [data missing]	Los Angeles
William H. Spurgeon (Santa Ana)	Democratic	January 3, 1887 – January 7, 1889	Elected in 1886. [data missing]	Los Angeles
E. E. Edwards (Los Angeles)	Republican	January 7, 1889 – January 5, 1891	Elected in 1888. [data missing]	Los Angeles
A. Guy Smith (Anaheim)	Republican	January 5, 1891 – January 2, 1893	Elected in 1890. [data missing]	Los Angeles, Orange
John C. Lynch (San Bernardino)	Republican	January 2, 1893 – January 4, 1897	Redistricted from the 79th district and re-elected in 1892. Re-elected in 1894. [data missing]	San Bernadrino
T. H. Goff (San Bernardino)	Republican	January 4, 1897 – January 2, 1899	Elected in 1896. Lost re-election.	San Bernadrino
Frank P. Meserve (Redlands)	Independent	January 2, 1899 – January 1, 1901	Elected in 1898. Retired to run for State Senate.	San Bernadrino
C. G. H. Bennink (Ontario)	Republican	January 1, 1901 – January 5, 1903	Elected in 1900. Re-elected in 1902. [data missing]	San Bernadrino
Frank D. Lewis (Riverside)	Republican	January 5, 1903 – January 2, 1905	Elected in 1902. [data missing]	Riverside
Miguel Estudillo (Riverside)	Republican	January 2, 1905 – January 4, 1909	Elected in 1904. Re-elected in 1906. Retired to run for California State Senate.	Riverside
Emerson B. Collier (Corona)	Republican	January 4, 1909 – January 2, 1911	Elected in 1908. [data missing]	Riverside
George R. Freeman (Corona)	Republican	January 2, 1911 – January 6, 1913	Elected in 1910. [data missing]	Riverside
H. W. Moorhouse (Herber)	Republican	January 6, 1913 – January 4, 1915	Elected in 1912. [data missing]	Imperial
Robert E. Wills (Brawley)	Democratic	January 4, 1915 – January 6, 1919	Elected in 1914. Re-elected in 1916. [data missing]	Imperial
Robert E. Wills (Brawley)	Republican	January 4, 1915 – January 6, 1919	Elected in 1914. Re-elected in 1916. [data missing]	Imperial
J. Stanley Brown (El Centro)	Republican	January 6, 1919 – January 3, 1921	Elected in 1918. [data missing]	Imperial
W. F. Beal (Brawley)	Republican	January 3, 1921 – January 8, 1923	Elected in 1920. [data missing]	Imperial
George H. Davis (El Centro)	Republican	January 8, 1923 – January 5, 1925	Elected in 1922. [data missing]	Imperial
Albert C. Finney (El Centro)	Republican	January 5, 1925 – January 3, 1927	Elected in 1924. [data missing]	Imperial
Myron D. Witter (El Centro)	Republican	January 3, 1927 – February 19, 1931	Elected in 1926. Re-elected in 1928. Redistricted to the 77th district.	Imperial
George B. Bowers (San Diego)	Republican	January 5, 1931 – January 7, 1935	Elected in 1930. Re-elected in 1932. [data missing]	San Diego
Ralph W. Wallace (San Diego)	Republican	January 7, 1935 – January 4, 1937	Elected in 1934. Lost re-election.	San Diego
Jeanette E. Daley (San Diego)	Democratic	January 4, 1937 – January 4, 1943	Elected in 1936. Re-elected in 1938. Re-elected in 1940. Lost re-election.	San Diego
Fred H. Kraft (San Diego)	Republican	January 4, 1943 – January 6, 1947	Elected in 1942. Re-elected in 1944. Retired to become a State Senator.	San Diego
Frank Luckel (San Diego)	Republican	January 6, 1947 – January 7, 1963	Elected in 1946. Re-elected in 1948. Re-elected in 1950. Re-elected in 1952. Re-elected in 1954. Re-elected in 1956. Re-elected in 1958. Re-elected in 1960. Retired.	San Diego
E. Richard Barnes (El Cajon)	Republican	January 7, 1963 – January 8, 1973	Elected in 1962. Re-elected in 1964. Re-elected in 1966. Re-elected in 1968. Re-elected in 1970. Lost re-election.	San Diego
Lawrence Kapiloff (San Diego)	Democratic	January 8, 1973 – September 3, 1982	Elected in 1972. Re-elected in 1974. Re-elected in 1976. Re-elected in 1978. Re-elected in 1980. Resigned to become a superior court judge.	San Diego
Vacant		September 3, 1982 – December 6, 1982		San Diego
Lucy Killea (San Diego)	Democratic	December 6, 1982 – December 21, 1989	Elected in 1982. Re-elected in 1984. Re-elected in 1986. Re-elected in 1988. Resigned to become a State Senator.	San Diego
Vacant		December 21, 1989 – June 7, 1990		San Diego
Jeff Marston (San Diego)	Republican	June 7, 1990 – November 30, 1990	Elected to finish Killea's term. Lost re-election.	San Diego
Mike Gotch (San Diego)	Democratic	December 3, 1990 – November 30, 1992	Elected in 1990. Redistricted to the 76th district.	San Diego
Dede Alpert (San Diego)	Democratic	December 7, 1992 – November 30, 1996	Redistricted from the 75th district and re-elected in 1992. Re-elected in 1994. Retired to become a State Senator.	San Diego
Howard Wayne (San Diego)	Democratic	December 2, 1996 – November 30, 2002	Elected in 1996. Re-elected in 1998. Re-elected in 2000. Retired to run for San Diego City Attorney.	San Diego
Shirley Horton (Chula Vista)	Republican	December 2, 2002 – November 30, 2008	Elected in 2002. Re-elected in 2004. Re-elected in 2006. Term-limited and retired.	San Diego
Marty Block (San Diego)	Democratic	December 1, 2008 – November 30, 2012	Elected in 2008. Re-elected in 2010. Retired to become a State Senator.	San Diego
Toni G. Atkins (San Diego)	Democratic	December 3, 2012 – November 30, 2016	Redistricted from the 76th district and re-elected in 2012. Re-elected in 2014. Term-limited and retired.	San Diego
Todd Gloria (San Diego)	Democratic	December 5, 2016 – November 30, 2020	Elected in 2016. Re-elected in 2018. Retired to run for mayor of San Diego.	San Diego
Chris Ward (San Diego)	Democratic	December 7, 2020 – present	Elected in 2020. Re-elected in 2022. Re-elected in 2024.	San Diego

== Election results (1990-present) ==
=== 2024 ===
2024 California State Assembly 78th district election
Primary election
Party	Candidate	Votes	%
Democratic	Chris Ward (incumbent)	79,090	100.0
Total votes		79,090	100.0
General election
Democratic	Chris Ward (incumbent)	175,178	100.0
Total votes		175,178	100.0
Democratic hold			

=== 2022 ===
2022 California State Assembly 78th district election
Primary election
Party	Candidate	Votes	%
Democratic	Chris Ward (incumbent)	76,917	68.2
Republican	Eric E. Gonzales	35,857	31.8
Total votes		112,774	100.0
General election
Democratic	Chris Ward (incumbent)	118,215	68.6
Republican	Eric E. Gonzales	54,234	31.4
Total votes		172,449	100.0
Democratic hold			

=== 2020 ===
2020 California State Assembly 78th district election
Primary election
Party	Candidate	Votes	%
Democratic	Chris Ward	69,125	55.6
Democratic	Sarah Davis	34,410	27.7
Democratic	Micah Perlin	20,741	16.7
Total votes		124,276	100.0
General election
Democratic	Chris Ward	123,755	56.2
Democratic	Sarah Davis	96,486	43.8
Total votes		220,241	100.0
Democratic hold			

=== 2018 ===
2018 California State Assembly 78th district election
Primary election
Party	Candidate	Votes	%
Democratic	Todd Gloria (incumbent)	79,738	71.2
Republican	Maggie J. Campbell	32,250	28.8
Total votes		111,988	100.0
General election
Democratic	Todd Gloria (incumbent)	140,598	71.1
Republican	Maggie J. Campbell	57,217	28.9
Total votes		197,815	100.0
Democratic hold			

=== 2016 ===
2016 California State Assembly 78th district election
Primary election
Party	Candidate	Votes	%
Democratic	Todd Gloria	91,602	71.8
Republican	Kevin D. Melton	36,013	28.2
Total votes		127,615	100.0
General election
Democratic	Todd Gloria	145,850	69.1
Republican	Kevin D. Melton	65,134	30.9
Total votes		178,242	100.0
Democratic hold			

=== 2014 ===
2014 California State Assembly 78th district election
Primary election
Party	Candidate	Votes	%
Democratic	Toni Atkins (incumbent)	45,922	60.2
Republican	Barbara Decker	21,545	28.2
Republican	Kevin D. Melton	8,855	11.6
Total votes		76,322	100.0
General election
Democratic	Toni Atkins (incumbent)	72,224	61.6
Republican	Barbara Decker	45,088	38.4
Total votes		117,312	100.0
Democratic hold			

=== 2012 ===
2012 California State Assembly 78th district election
Primary election
Party	Candidate	Votes	%
Democratic	Toni Atkins (incumbent)	54,175	59.8
Republican	Ralph Denney	25,291	27.9
Republican	Robert E. Williams	11,121	12.3
Total votes		90,587	100.0
General election
Democratic	Toni Atkins (incumbent)	116,987	62.4
Republican	Ralph Denney	70,526	37.6
Total votes		187,513	100.0
Democratic hold			

=== 2010 ===
2010 California State Assembly 78th district election
Party	Candidate	Votes	%
Democratic	Marty Block (incumbent)	72,036	59.3
Republican	Rick L. Powell	49,455	40.7
Total votes		121,491	100.0
Democratic hold			

=== 2008 ===
2008 California State Assembly 78th district election
Party	Candidate	Votes	%
Democratic	Marty Block	93,938	55.5
Republican	John McCann	75,350	44.5
Total votes		169,288	100.0
Democratic gain from Republican			

=== 2006 ===
2006 California State Assembly 78th district election
Party	Candidate	Votes	%
Republican	Shirley Horton (incumbent)	51,983	50.9
Democratic	Maxine Sherard	46,846	45.9
Libertarian	Geof Gibson	3,324	3.3
Total votes		102,153	100.0
Republican hold			

=== 2004 ===
2004 California State Assembly 78th district election
Party	Candidate	Votes	%
Republican	Shirley Horton (incumbent)	76,886	49.1
Democratic	Patty Davis	74,888	47.8
Libertarian	Josh Hale	4,969	3.2
Total votes		156,743	100.0
Republican hold			

=== 2002 ===
2002 California State Assembly 78th district election
Party	Candidate	Votes	%
Republican	Shirley Horton	45,826	49.4
Democratic	Vincent Hall	44,247	47.6
Libertarian	Mark Menanno	2,819	3.0
Total votes		92,892	100.0
Republican gain from Democratic			

=== 2000 ===
2000 California State Assembly 78th district election
Party	Candidate	Votes	%
Democratic	Howard Wayne (incumbent)	79,764	56.1
Republican	John Steel	54,700	38.4
Libertarian	Dennis Triglia	5,978	4.2
Natural Law	Raymond C. Wingfield	1,840	1.3
Total votes		142,282	100.0
Democratic hold			

=== 1998 ===
1998 California State Assembly 78th district election
Party	Candidate	Votes	%
Democratic	Howard Wayne (incumbent)	65,566	56.6
Republican	Jean Roesch	44,484	38.4
Libertarian	John Murphy	3,551	3.1
Natural Law	Stuart Knoles	2,228	1.9
Total votes		115,829	100.0
Democratic hold			

=== 1996 ===
1996 California State Assembly 78th district election
Party	Candidate	Votes	%
Democratic	Howard Wayne	69,587	48.7
Republican	Tricia Hunter	65,440	45.8
American Independent	Nathan E. Johnson	7,475	5.2
No party	Elizabeth Lenardi (write-in)	453	0.3
Total votes		142,955	100.0
Democratic hold			

=== 1994 ===
1994 California State Assembly 78th district election
Party	Candidate	Votes	%
Democratic	Deirdre "Dede" Alpert (incumbent)	63,557	52.5
Republican	Bruce Henderson	53,980	44.6
Peace and Freedom	James Fife	3,437	2.8
Total votes		120,974	100.0
Democratic hold			

=== 1992 ===
1992 California State Assembly 78th district election
Party	Candidate	Votes	%
Democratic	Deirdre "Dede" Alpert (incumbent)	81,819	53.4
Republican	Jeff Marston	63,293	41.3
Peace and Freedom	Sally Sherry O'Brien	7,792	5.1
No party	Dan van Tieghem (write-in)	353	0.2
Total votes		153,257	100.0
Democratic hold			

=== 1990 ===
1990 California State Assembly 78th district election
Party	Candidate	Votes	%
Democratic	Mike Gotch	41,178	44.7
Republican	Jeff Marston (incumbent)	40,561	44.0
Libertarian	Ed McWilliams	5,571	6.0
Peace and Freedom	Bob Bardell	4,228	4.6
No party	Alacia Edwards (write-in)	592	0.6
Total votes		92,131	100.0
Democratic gain from Republican			

=== 1990 (special) ===
1990 California State Assembly 78th district special election Vacancy resulting from the resignation of Lucy Killea
Party	Candidate	Votes	%
Republican	Jeff Marston	30,423	48.4
Democratic	Mike Gotch	27,718	44.1
Peace and Freedom	Jane Rocio Evans	4,707	7.5
Total votes		62,848	100.0
Republican gain from Democratic			

== See also ==
- California State Assembly
- California State Assembly districts
- Districts in California
