= Charles A. Hunt (California politician) =

American politician

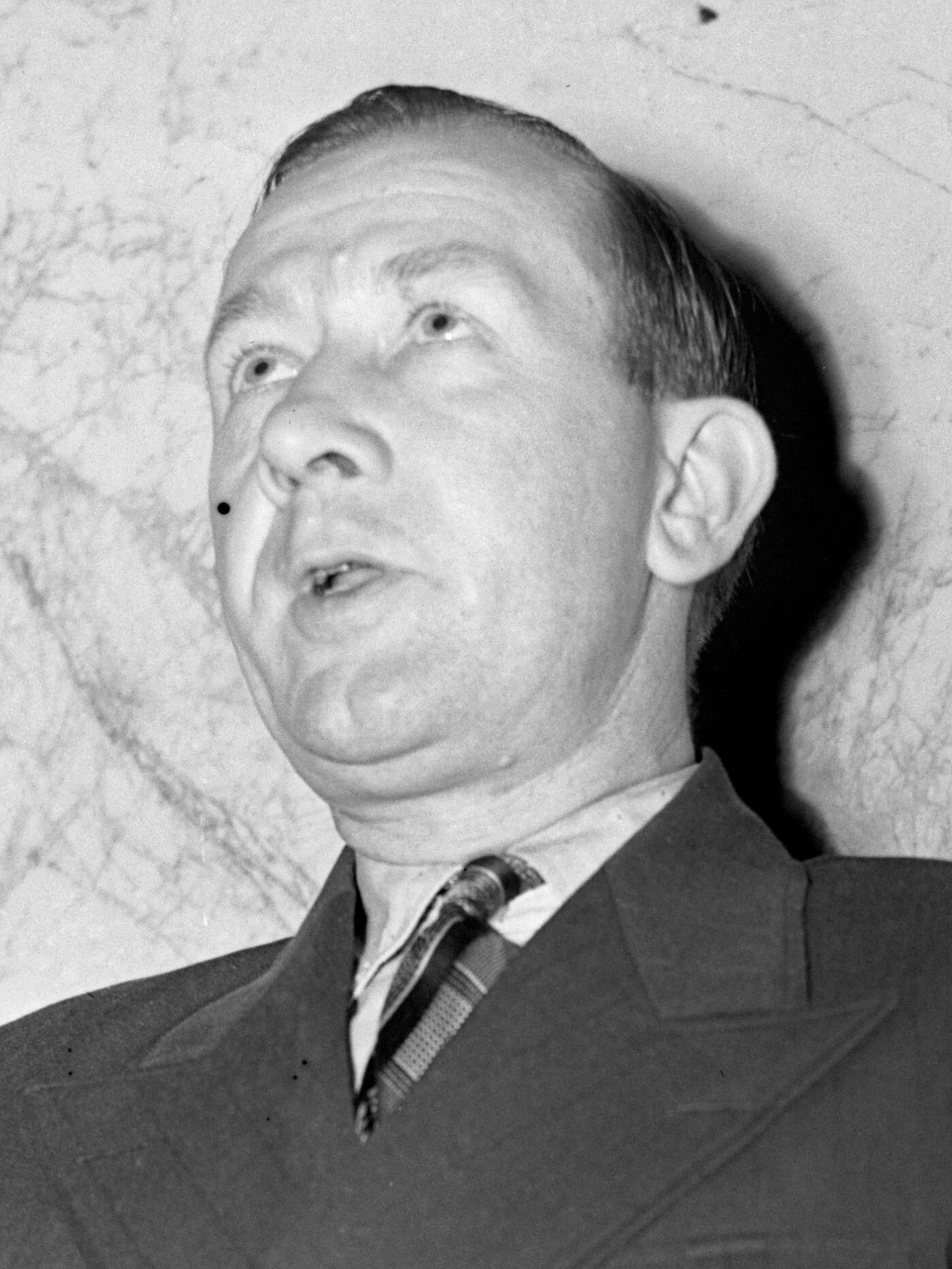
- Hunt in 1938

Member of the California State Assembly from the 45th district
- In office January 2, 1933 – January 2, 1939
- Preceded by: Lucius Powers Jr.
- Succeeded by: Thomas J. Doyle

Personal details
- Born: August 28, 1896 Salt Lake City, Utah, U.S.
- Died: December 27, 1978 (aged 82) Los Angeles, California, U.S.
- Party: Democratic
- Spouse: Blanche Black

Military service
- Allegiance: United States
- Branch/service: United States Army
- Years of service: 1917–1919
- Rank: Private first class
- Unit: 16th Field Artillery Regiment
- Battles/wars: World War I

Charles August Hunt (August 28, 1896 – December 27, 1978) was an American union fireman and politician who served in the California State Assembly for the 45th district from 1933 to 1939. During World War I, he was in the United States Army from April 1917 to May 1919 and became a private first class. He served in the Headquarters Battery, 16th Field Artillery Regiment.

Hunt was one of two dozen "EPIC Democrats" elected to the state legislature in 1934.

He is buried at Riverside National Cemetery, Riverside, California.
