= George B. Bowers =

American politician

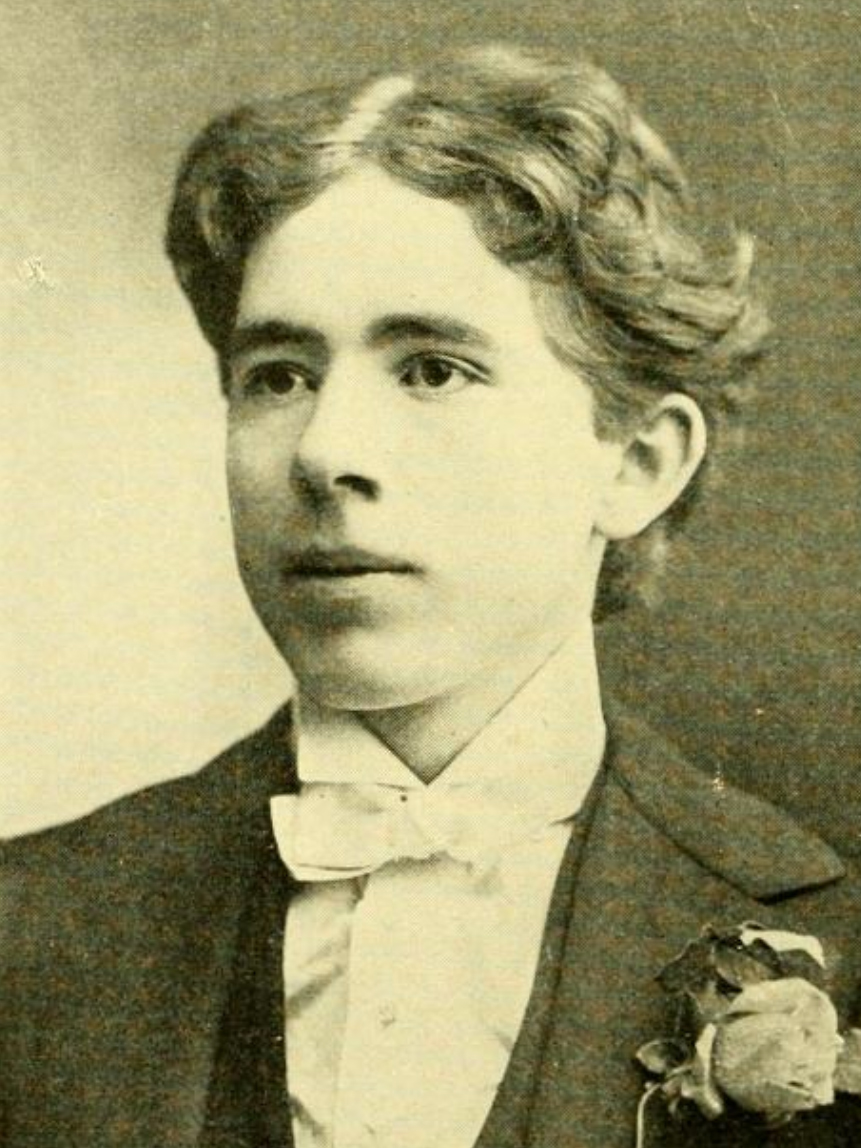

Member of the California State Assembly from the 78th district
- In office January 5, 1931 – January 7, 1935
- Preceded by: Myron D. Witter
- Succeeded by: Ralph W. Wallace

Personal details
- Born: July 15, 1878 Decatur, Indiana, U.S.
- Died: January 9, 1944 (aged 65) California, U.S.
- Party: Republican

Military service
- Branch/service: United States Army
- Battles/wars: Spanish–American War; Philippines Occupation; World War I

George Ballard Bowers (July 15, 1878 – January 9, 1944) served in the California State Assembly for the 78th district from 1931 to 1935. He served in the United States Army during the Spanish–American War, during the subsequent occupations of the Philippines and Cuba and during World War I.
