= Jesse Gabriel =

American lawyer and politician

- Incumbent
- Assumed office June 11, 2018
- Preceded by: Matt Dababneh
- Constituency: 45th district (2018–2022); 46th district (2022–present)

Personal details
- Born: Jesse Samuel Gabriel; September 25, 1981 (age 45) Berkeley, California, U.S.
- Party: Democratic
- Spouse: Rachel Rosner
- Children: 3
- Education: University of California, Berkeley (BA); Harvard University (JD)

Jesse Samuel Gabriel (born September 25, 1981) is an American lawyer and politician. A member of the Democratic Party, Gabriel represents California's 46th State Assembly district, which includes much of the western San Fernando Valley, in the California State Assembly.

Gabriel currently serves as Chair of the powerful Assembly Budget Committee as well as Chair of the California Legislative Jewish Caucus. During his time in the legislature, he has authored more than 50 new laws and has been recognized as a “California Influencer” by The Sacramento Bee.

== Early life and education ==
Gabriel was born in Berkeley, California, and raised in Oak Park, California. He is Jewish.

In 2004, Gabriel graduated from the University of California, Berkeley with a bachelor's degree in political science. At Berkeley, he served as student government president in the Associated Students of the University of California during the 2002–03 academic year. He earned his Juris Doctor from Harvard Law School, where he graduated with honors and received the Dean's Award for Community Leadership from then Dean and now U.S. Supreme Court Associate Justice Elena Kagan.

== Career ==
From 2008 to 2010, he served as counsel to Evan Bayh while Bayh was serving as a member of the United States Senate.

Before being elected to the California State Assembly, Gabriel worked as a constitutional rights and general litigation attorney for Gibson, Dunn & Crutcher in Los Angeles, where he was a part of the firm's litigation and public policy groups. Gabriel's most notable cases included representing victims of domestic abuse, Holocaust survivors, and groups facing hate-motivated violence. In 2017, he filed two lawsuits against the Trump Administration on behalf of young illegal immigrants, also known as Dreamers, who were protected by the Deferred Action for Childhood Arrivals (DACA) program. He received the California Lawyer Attorney of the Year award from The Daily Journal in 2018.

Prior to his election in 2018, Gabriel served as a board member of the Jewish Federation of Greater Los Angeles and the League of Conservation Voters. He also was appointed by Los Angeles County Supervisor Zev Yaroslavsky to the Los Angeles County Commission on Local Governmental Services.

=== California Assembly ===
Following Matt Dababneh's resignation from the California State Assembly after numerous charges of sexual harassment, effective December 31, 2017, Gabriel announced his candidacy in a special election to replace him in California's 45th State Assembly district. Gabriel won the special election on June 5, 2018, earning 65.7 percent of the vote. He was sworn into office on June 11. He won reelection to his first full term in the November 2018 General Election against Justin Clark, winning with 70.3 percent of the vote.

Shortly after assuming office, Gabriel was appointed to the State Assembly Leadership as Assistant Majority Whip under Majority Whip Todd Gloria. He also was elected by his colleagues as Vice Chair of the California Legislative Jewish Caucus under Chair Ben Allen.

=== Legislation ===
During his first full term in the State Assembly, Gabriel authored nine bills that were signed into law by Governor Gavin Newsom, including legislation to expand legal services for low-income Californians in civil cases and to establish a Nonprofit Security Grant Program to improve the physical security of nonprofit organizations that are at high risk of violent attacks or hate crimes.

==== Constitutional Rights ====
Gabriel was a principal co-author of the constitutional amendment to protect reproductive freedom in the California Constitution. He also co-authored the constitutional amendment to protect marriage equality in the California Constitution.

==== Public safety ====
In 2019, Gabriel co-founded a legislative working group that hosted former congresswoman and gun control advocate Gabrielle Giffords, the Brady Campaign, and Moms Demand Action with the purpose of discussing gun control in California and enacting more than a dozen new gun safety measures.

In 2023, Gabriel authored the Gun Violence Prevention and School Safety Act, a first-in-the-nation measure which taxes gun industry profits to fund gun violence prevention and school safety in communities across California. This legislation was supported by a coalition of more than 100 gun safety groups but was strongly opposed by the National Rifle Association and the California Rifle & Pistol Association. Governor Newsom signed the bill into law on September 26, 2023. Gabriel also authored legislation prohibiting the sale of DIY machine guns, which Governor Newsom signed on October 10, 2025.

In 2025, following the Palisades Fire and Eaton Fire, which both struck Los Angeles County, Gabriel introduced legislation strengthening penalties for looting and impersonation of first responders during wildfires and other emergencies. Governor Newsom signed the bill as part of a package of legislation supporting recovery and rebuilding efforts.

==== Food safety and ultraprocessed foods ====
In 2023, Gabriel authored the California Food Safety Act, a bipartisan measure to ban red dye no. 3, potassium bromate, brominated vegetable oil, and propylparaben from foods sold in California. The bill received significant national and international press coverage and was described as a “truly historic win for consumers”. The bill passed the legislature on a bipartisan vote in both houses and was signed into law by Governor Newsom on October 7, 2023.

In 2024, Gabriel authored the California School Food Safety Act, first-in-the-nation legislation which prohibits California public schools from serving foods containing six synthetic food dyes linked to behavioral harm to children. The legislation passed with bipartisan support and was signed by Governor Newsom on September 28, 2024.

In 2025, Gabriel authored the Real Food, Healthy Kids Act, landmark legislation that provides the first-ever statutory definition of ultra-processed food and will phase out the most harmful ultra-processed foods from California schools. Governor Newsom signed the bill into law at a signing ceremony on October 8, 2025, where he celebrated the law as a first-in-the-nation measure to ensure California students have access to healthy meals made from real foods, not harmful chemical additives.

==== Environmental protection ====
Gabriel is consistently ranked as one of the Legislature’s most committed environmentalists. A former Board Member of the Los Angeles League of Conservation Voters, he has championed efforts to address climate change, expand electric vehicle charging infrastructure, encourage water conservation, and protect California’s precious natural resources.

==== Supporting small businesses ====
In response to the COVID-19 pandemic, Gabriel authored several measures cutting red tape and helping struggling neighborhood restaurants safely expand outdoor dining.

==== Housing and homelessness ====
Gabriel has worked extensively on legislation to address housing and homelessness in California. He has authored bills to support homeless veterans, increase accountability for homelessness funding and programs, and deliver more affordable housing.

== Electoral history ==
2018 California State Assembly 45th district special election Vacancy resulting from the resignation of Matt Dababneh
Primary election
Party	Candidate	Votes	%
Democratic	Jesse Gabriel	10,632	32.7
Republican	Justin M. Clark	8,172	25.1
Democratic	Tricia Robbins Kasson	5,507	16.9
Democratic	Ankur Patel	3,698	11.4
No party preference	Dennis Zine	2,491	7.7
Democratic	David Brin	752	2.3
Democratic	Raymond J. Bishop	685	2.1
Democratic	Jeff Bornstein	590	1.8
Democratic	C.R. Cochrane (write-in)	7	0.0
Total votes		32,534	100.0
General election
Democratic	Jesse Gabriel	46,168	65.7
Republican	Justin M. Clark	24,109	34.3
Total votes		70,277	100.0
Democratic hold			

2018 California State Assembly 45th district election
Primary election
Party	Candidate	Votes	%
Democratic	Jesse Gabriel	31,068	43.7
Republican	Justin M. Clark	22,709	31.9
Democratic	Tricia Robbins Kasson	5,277	7.4
Democratic	Ankur Patel	4,534	6.4
Democratic	Jeff Bornstein	4,039	5.7
Democratic	Daniel Brin	2,432	3.4
Democratic	Ray Bishop	1,088	1.5
Total votes		71,147	100.0
General election
Democratic	Jesse Gabriel (incumbent) (Note: Candidate was not an incumbent during the primary but was an incumbent in the general election after winning the special election for the seat. The special election was held on the same day as the primary.)	107,757	70.3
Republican	Justin M. Clark	45,619	29.7
Total votes		153,376	100.0
Democratic hold			

2020 California State Assembly 45th district election
Primary election
Party	Candidate	Votes	%
Democratic	Jesse Gabriel (incumbent)	77,512	98.8
Republican	Jeffi Girgenti (write-in)	955	1.2
Democratic	Lanira K. Murphy (write-in)	23	0.0
Total votes		78,490	100.0
General election
Democratic	Jesse Gabriel (incumbent)	136,904	66.2
Republican	Jeffi Girgenti	69,802	33.8
Total votes		206,706	100.0
Democratic hold			

2022 California State Assembly 46th district election
Primary election
Party	Candidate	Votes	%
Democratic	Jesse Gabriel (incumbent)	52,362	67.3
Republican	Dana Caruso	25,437	32.7
Total votes		77,799	100.0
General election
Democratic	Jesse Gabriel (incumbent)	78,726	65.4
Republican	Dana Caruso	41,619	34.6
Total votes		120,345	100.0
Democratic hold			

2024 California State Assembly 46th district election
Primary election
Party	Candidate	Votes	%
Democratic	Jesse Gabriel (incumbent)	50,156	65.5
Republican	Tracey Schroeder	26,371	34.5
Total votes		76,527	100.0
General election
Democratic	Jesse Gabriel (incumbent)	107,003	62.9
Republican	Tracey Schroeder	63,114	37.1
Total votes		170,117	100.0
Democratic hold			

== Personal life ==
Gabriel lives in Encino with his wife Rachel Rosner, an affordable housing attorney, and their three sons.
