= Lawrence Kapiloff =

American politician (1929–2019)

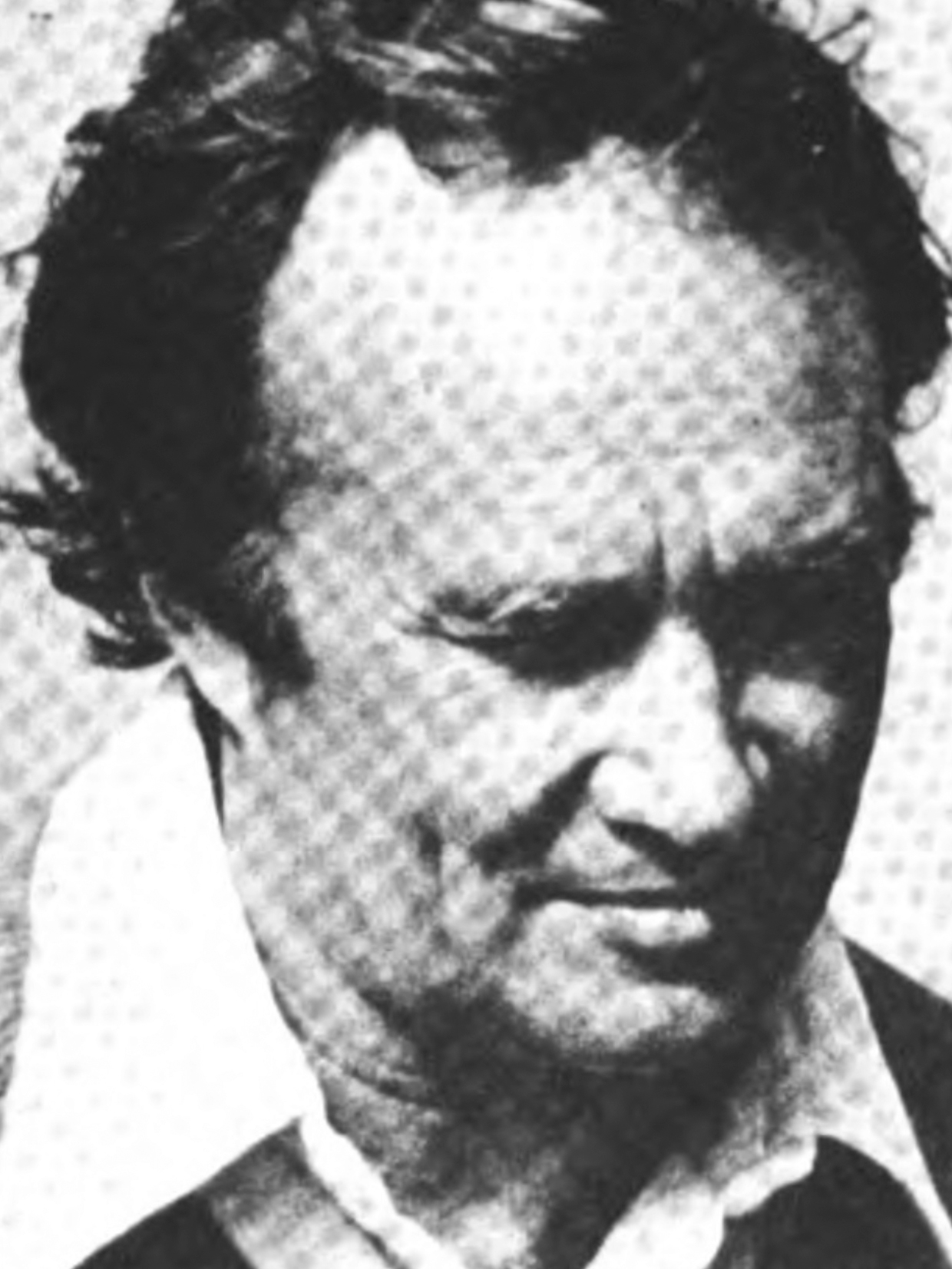

Member of the California State Assembly from the 78th district
- In office January 8, 1973 – September 3, 1982
- Preceded by: E. Richard Barnes
- Succeeded by: Lucy Killea

Personal details
- Born: September 22, 1929 Brooklyn, New York, U.S.
- Died: January 12, 2019 (aged 89) San Diego, California, U.S.
- Party: Democratic
- Spouse: Elizabeth Cowan
- Children: 7
- Occupation: Lawyer, Judge

Military service
- Branch/service: United States Air Force

Lawrence Kapiloff (September 22, 1929 - January 12, 2019) was an American politician. He served in the California State Assembly from 1973 to 1982, as a Democrat for the 78th district. He was born in Brooklyn, New York.
