= Kafi D. Blumenfield =

Community civic leader and activist in Los Angeles

Kafi Blumenfield (née Watlington; born 1971) is a civic leader and activist in Los Angeles, the state of California, and the Virgin Islands.

== Family ==
Blumenfield was born Kafi Watlington to parents Janet Watlington, the manager of the Virgin Islands government's federal programs office in Washington, D.C., and marine physicist Roy Watlington. Her parents were both native to the Virgin Islands, but had studied, worked, and lived in the continental United States for many years. After her parents divorced, her father moved to take a faculty position at the University of the Virgin Islands. Her mother remarried and Blumenfield took her stepfather, Michael MacLeod's, name, subsequently going by Kafi Watlington-MacLeod. She continued living in Washington, D.C.

She is now a resident of Woodland Hills, Los Angeles, where she lives with her husband, Los Angeles Councilmember Bob Blumenfield, and their two children.

== Career ==
After graduating with a degree in politics from Pomona College in 1993, Blumenfield's first job was as a White House Intern for the Clinton Administration. She continued her education at UCLA School of Law. She held a series of jobs related to housing and environmental issues, including a job at the Natural Resources Defense Council's Los Angeles Office, Deputy Director Chief of Staff for grassroots justice organization Neighbor to Neighbor, director of programs for the Fair Housing Council of the San Gabriel Valley, and working as a consultant for Liberty Vote.

Eventually, Blumenfield rose to be president and CEO of the Liberty Hill Foundation, the parent nonprofit organization that funded Liberty Vote, along with a range of other grassroots organizations in Los Angeles. She worked there for six years, raising an average of $6.9 million annually, from 2008 to 2012, to distribute in support of local initiatives. When she left, in November 2013, she wanted to take a year off to contemplate her future career path.

Instead of having the year off, however, she was recruited to be the founding executive director of Discovery Cube LA, a children's museum with a focus on STEM, and the first major museum in the San Fernando Valley. Again, fundraising comprised a large part of her job—she was responsible for helping to meet the $4.7 million estimated annual budget.

Currently, Blumenfield is in the process of starting up the leadership development organization, Alisyo.

== Board, advisory, and appointed positions ==
Blumenfield sits on many boards, such as The Tides Foundation, The Community Foundation of the Virgin Islands, The James Irvine Foundation—including sitting on the selection committee for the James Irvine Foundation Leadership Awards, and acting as board chair since 2019, Southern California Grantmakers, the Self Help Federal Credit Union, and the Planned Parenthood Advocacy Project in Los Angeles. Others include River LA, Pomona College's Draper Center, Anti-Recidivism Coalition and Project X. She is also on the board of UCLA's Luskin School of Public Affairs, where she has served as a Luskin School Senior Fellow since 2015.

Since 2011 she has been commissioner of the California Commission on the Status of Women and Girls; an appointee to the Los Angeles County Women and Girls Initiative since 2017; and in 2014, Los Angeles Mayor Eric Garcetti appointed Blumenfield to the Los Angeles Board of Recreation and Parks. She resigned later in the year when she took on leadership of the Cube, since the Board of Recreation and Parks oversees elements of the museum's management.

== Recognition ==
These organizations have recognized Blumenfield's civic contributions:

- Los Angeles Alliance for a New Economy - 2016 City of Justice Awards honoree
- Liberty Hill Foundation - 2014 Diversity in Philanthropy Award
- The National Gay and Lesbian Task Force - 2013
- The National Women's Political Caucus LA Westside - 2012 Remarkable Women Leaders’ Calendar
- National Council of Negro Women - 2012 Distinguished Community Leader Honoree
- Stonewall Young Democrats - 2011 Visionary Award
