= Chris Ward (California politician) =

American politician (born 1976)

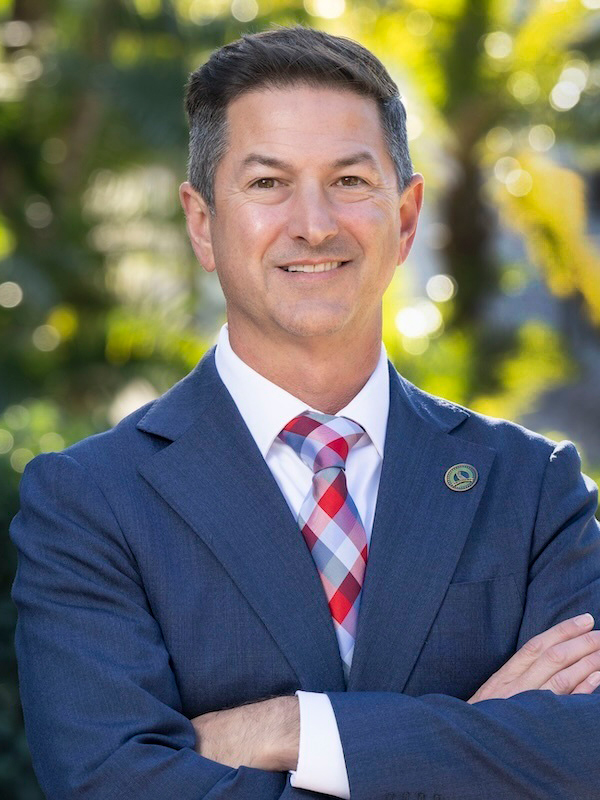
- Official portrait, c. 2025

Speaker pro tempore of the California State Assembly
- In office December 5, 2022 – July 3, 2023
- Preceded by: Kevin Mullin
- Succeeded by: Cecilia Aguiar-Curry

Member of the California State Assembly from the 78th district
- Incumbent
- Assumed office December 7, 2020
- Preceded by: Todd Gloria

Member of the San Diego City Council from the 3rd district
- In office December 12, 2016 – December 7, 2020
- Preceded by: Todd Gloria
- Succeeded by: Stephen Whitburn

Personal details
- Born: August 3, 1976 (age 49) West Germany
- Party: Democratic
- Spouse: Thom Harpole
- Children: 2
- Education: Johns Hopkins University (BA); Harvard University (MPP, MUP)

Christopher Ward (born August 3, 1976) is an American politician serving as a member of the California State Assembly for the 78th district. Prior to his election to the State Assembly, Ward served as a member of the San Diego City Council, representing the 3rd Council district. He is a Democrat.

== Early life and education ==
Ward was born in Germany in 1976. He earned a Bachelor of Arts degree at Johns Hopkins University and a Master in Public Policy and Urban Planning at the Harvard Kennedy School.

== Career ==
He worked as an environmental planner at the firm EDAW, working with local government to develop land use plans and conduct environmental review, and as a researcher at the Ludwig Cancer Research at the University of California, San Diego. He then served as the chief of staff to State Senator Marty Block.

Chris is an active member of the San Diego chapter of the Truman National Security Project.

=== San Diego City Council ===
==== Elections ====
In 2016, Ward ran for an open seat on the San Diego City Council representing District 3. District 3 includes the neighborhoods of Balboa Park, Bankers Hill/Park West, Downtown San Diego, Golden Hill, Hillcrest, Little Italy, Mission Hills, Normal Heights, North Park, Old Town, and University Heights. Incumbent council member Todd Gloria ran for mayor of San Diego. Ward was elected in the June primary with a majority of the vote.

==== Tenure ====
As a councilmember, Ward worked to identify measures that will significantly reduce San Diego's overall homeless population. These included three temporary shelters to house 700 individuals, an additional storage facility to serve 500 clients, and a proposed centralized homeless navigation center. In July 2017, the City Council unanimously approved an Equal Pay Ordinance that was proposed by Ward. The ordinance requires companies that do business with the city to pay their employees equally regardless of gender or race.

In January 2019, the City Council approved a measure proposed by Ward that bans, for environmental reasons, the use of polystyrene (Styrofoam) for most retail uses including food service, egg cartons, and coolers. The ordinance also stipulates that single-use plastic items such as straws and eating utensils be available only on request. According to Ward, San Diego is the largest city in California to take this action.

==== Committee assignments ====
- Active Transportation and Infrastructure Committee (Vice Chair)
- Economic Development and Intergovernmental Relations Committee (Chair)
- Land Use and Housing Committee (Vice Chair)
- Rules Committee

=== California State Assembly ===
==== Elections ====
On January 24, 2019, Ward announced that he would be a candidate for the California State Assembly in district 78 to succeed Assemblyman Todd Gloria, who was running for mayor of San Diego. Ward received the most votes and was elected to the Assembly in 2020.

Ward ran for reelection in 2022. He won by a 37 percentage point margin against Republican Eric Gonzales.

==== Tenure ====
Ward was involved in gun violence reduction legislation that was signed into law in 2022 that enables lawsuits against gun manufacturers and retailers for negligence. He authored another bill that was signed into law in 2022 that changes procedures for altering gender and sex identifiers on government documents.

Ward has been characterized as a "pro-housing" legislator. In 2022, he pushed for legislation that would have prioritized dense urban development while limiting sprawl.

Ward had advocated for consumer protections. In 2025, he introduced one bill that would ban the sale of user location data to ICE, and another that would ban price discrimination in retail stores.

Ward is a member of the California Legislative Progressive Caucus.

== Personal life ==
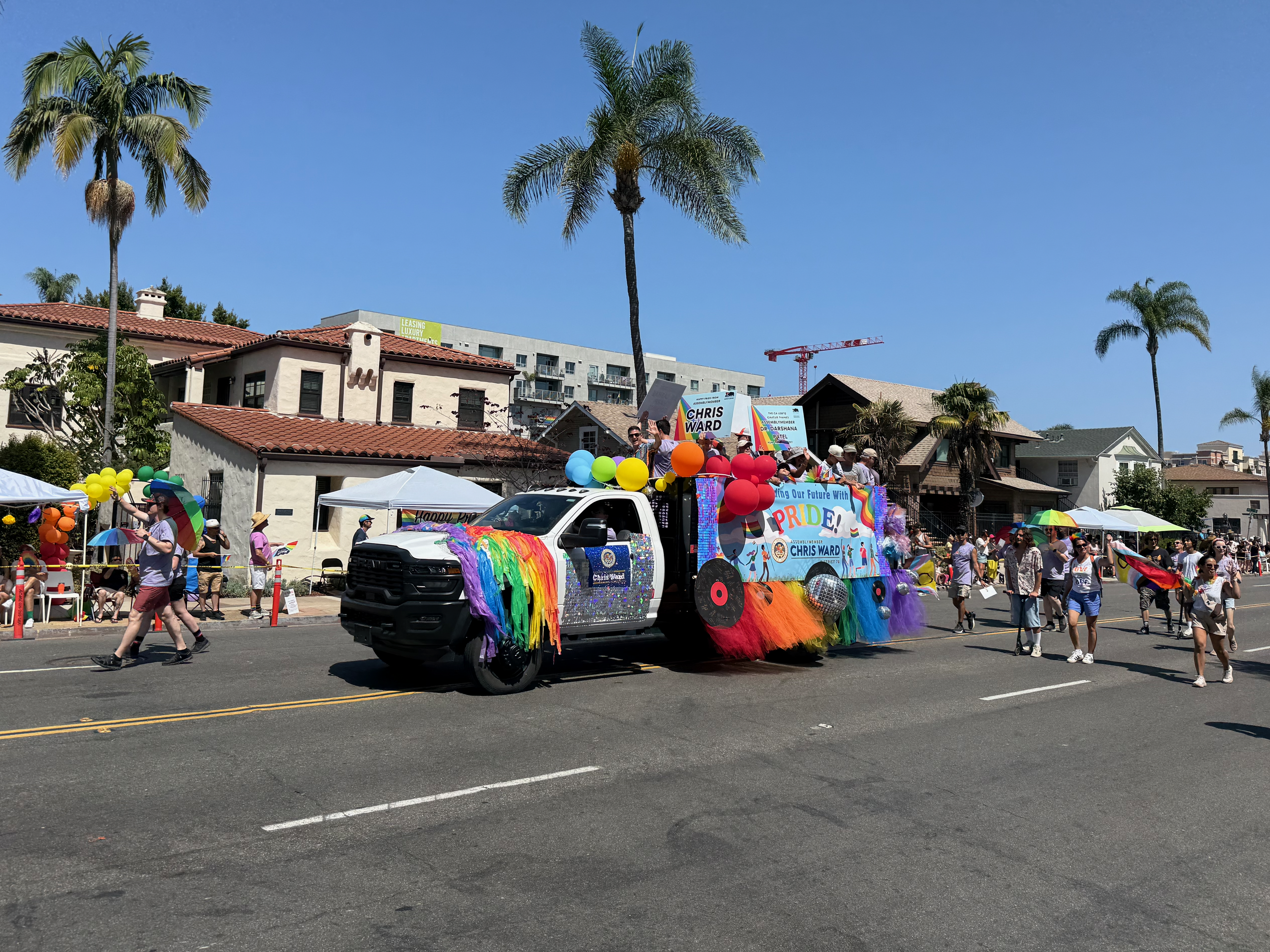
Ward in the 2026 San Diego Pride parade

Ward is gay. He and his partner Thom are homeowners in University Heights, where they live with their two children.

== Electoral history ==
=== San Diego City Council ===
2016 San Diego City Council 3rd district election
Candidate	Votes	%
Chris Ward	24,512	58.5
Anthony Bernal	11,492	27.4
Scott Sanborn	5,800	13.9
Total votes	41,804	100.0

=== California State Assembly ===
2020 California State Assembly 78th district election
Primary election
Party	Candidate	Votes	%
Democratic	Chris Ward	69,125	55.6
Democratic	Sarah Davis	34,410	27.7
Democratic	Micah Perlin	20,741	16.7
Total votes		124,276	100.0
General election
Democratic	Chris Ward	123,755	56.2
Democratic	Sarah Davis	96,486	43.8
Total votes		220,241	100.0
Democratic hold			

2022 California State Assembly 78th district election
Primary election
Party	Candidate	Votes	%
Democratic	Chris Ward (incumbent)	76,917	68.2
Republican	Eric E. Gonzales	35,857	31.8
Total votes		112,774	100.0
General election
Democratic	Chris Ward (incumbent)	118,215	68.6
Republican	Eric E. Gonzales	54,234	31.4
Total votes		172,449	100.0
Democratic hold			

2024 California State Assembly 78th district election
Primary election
Party	Candidate	Votes	%
Democratic	Chris Ward (incumbent)	79,090	100.0
Total votes		79,090	100.0
General election
Democratic	Chris Ward (incumbent)	175,178	100.0
Total votes		175,178	100.0
Democratic hold			

California Assembly
Preceded by Kevin Mullin	Speaker pro tempore of the California Assembly; 2022–2023	Succeeded by Cecilia Aguiar-Curry
