= Dede Alpert =

American politician (born 1945)

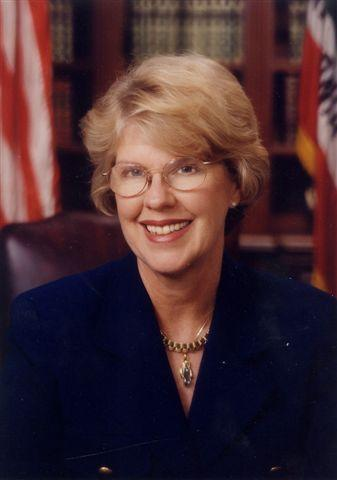

Member of the California Senate from the 39th district
- In office December 2, 1996 – November 30, 2004
- Preceded by: Lucy Killea
- Succeeded by: Christine Kehoe

Member of the California State Assembly
- In office December 3, 1990 – November 30, 1996
- Preceded by: Joyce Mojonnier
- Succeeded by: Howard Wayne
- Constituency: 75th district (1990–1992); 78th district (1992–1996)

Member of the Solana Beach School Board
- In office 1983–1990

Personal details
- Born: October 6, 1945 (age 80) New York, New York, US
- Party: Democratic
- Spouse: Michael Alpert
- Children: 3
- Occupation: Politician

Deirdre "Dede" W. Alpert (born October 6, 1945) is an American former state senator, assembly person and school board member in San Diego, California. A Democrat, she served in the California State Assembly as a member for the 75th district from 1990 to 1992 and from the 78th district from 1992 to 1996. She was a member of the California State Senate for the 39th district from 1996 to 2004.

== Early life and education ==
Alpert was born on October 6, 1945, in New York City. Her family moved to California in 1962 and she studied at Pomona College, receiving a degree in government. She married Michael Alpert, an attorney, in Los Angeles and the couple moved back to San Diego, where they had three daughters: Alison, Kristin, and Lehn.

Prior to entering politics, Alpert was a member of the Solana Beach School District Board from 1983 to 1990, becoming the president in 1987. The school district started programs to provide childcare before and after school, established an infant care center and improved two schools to be recognized by the state as distinguished schools. She was a court-appointed special advocate for Voices for Children and volunteered at her children's schools, with United Cerebral Palsy, and with the Girl Scouts.

== Political career ==
She was first elected to the California State Assembly in the 1990 state elections in an upset, unseating the Republican Assemblywoman Joyce Mojonnier with 53.4% of the vote. She ran a grassroots campaign, with the support of local newspapers. In 1995, she was unsuccessfully targeted for recall as part of a battle over the speakership. She served in the Assembly until 1996 and was a member for the California State Senate from 1996 to 2004, representing the 39th district in San Diego County. She retired from the Senate in 2004 due to term limits. She chaired the Senate appropriations committee, the joint committee on public education, and the House and Senate education committees.

Throughout her time in the legislature, Alpert focused on education, the environment, women's and children's issues and local businesses. She was reportedly known as "a moderate who could work across party lines". She was credited with the passage of legislation requiring standardised testing in public education, as well as funding schools on the basis of standardised test results. She passed a number of bills reforming domestic violence laws to better support victims.

== Later life ==
Following her retirement, she served as a board member for the Sharp Healthcare Hospital System, as a senior college commissioner for the Western Association of Schools and Colleges, and on the board of a charter school in south-east San Diego. She has also continued to be involved in advocacy regarding education policy.

== Honors ==
Alpert received the Association of California School Administrators' "Friend of Education Award" in 1998. She was named "Senator of the Year" by the California Journal in 2004 and received the Outstanding Legislator Award from the California County Boards of Education the same year. San Diego State University renamed their City Heights Center the Dede Alpert Center for Community Engagement in 2004. She was inducted into the San Diego County Women's Hall of Fame in March 2018 for her past Senate leadership. Her papers are held by the California State Archives.
