= Jewish California =

Non-profit organization located in the United States

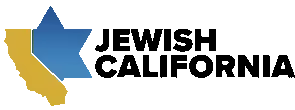
- Formation: 1972; 54 years ago (as Jewish Public Affairs Committee of California, or JPAC for short)
- Tax ID no.: 68-0028695
- Legal status: 501(c)(4) nonprofit organization
- Headquarters: Sacramento
- Chief Executive Officer: David Bocarsly
- Director of Policy and Partnerships: Miller Saltzman
- Affiliations: California Legislative Jewish Caucus; 30 Years After; AJC; ADL; Bet Tzedek; Dayenu Circle of Jewish Silicon Valley; Education, Training and Technical Assistance Los Angeles; Foundation for Jewish Camp; Hadassah; Hebrew Free Loan; HIAS; Holocaust Museum LA; Multiple Jewish Federation chapters, including JFSDC; Multiple JCRC chapters; Jewish BBBSA of Los Angeles; Jewish Center for Justice; JCPA; Jewish Family & Community Services East Bay; Multiple JFCS chapters; Multiple JFS chapters; Jewish Free Loan Association; Multiple Jewish Vocational Service chapters; Mazon; NCJW – San Francisco Section; San Francisco Campus for Jewish Living; Simon Wiesenthal Center
- Revenue: $841 thousand (2024)
- Employees: 4
- Website: jewishcal.org

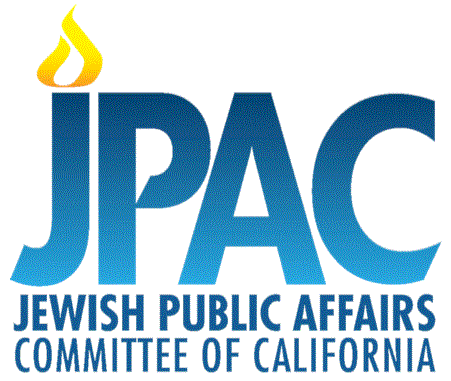
Organization's logo prior to the 2026 rebranding

Jewish California (formally known as Jewish Public Affairs Committee of California or JPAC) is an American Jewish advocacy umbrella organization and pro‑Israel advocacy group representing leading Jewish community organizations across California, self‑described as "the largest single‑state coalition of Jewish organizations in the nation". Founded in 1972, the organization advocates in Sacramento on behalf of California's approximately 1.2 million Jewish residents. Its formal policy framework — developed in collaboration with all member organizations — includes five stated institutional pillars: ensuring the safety and security of the Jewish community; supporting older adults and Holocaust survivors; sustaining services and programs for vulnerable populations; maintaining a strong California–Israel relationship; and combating antisemitism and hate. The pillar on California–Israel relations explicitly commits the organization to fostering economic, cultural, and educational exchanges between California and Israel and to "combat campaigns to delegitimize and demonize Israel, including the Boycott Divestment Sanctions Movement (BDS)".

Jewish California works in close partnership with the California Legislative Jewish Caucus (CLJC) and, since 2019, has successfully advocated for more than US$450 million in California state budget allocations for Jewish institutional programs, including nonprofit security grants, Holocaust education, and services for Holocaust survivors and other vulnerable populations. It was the lead sponsor of AB 715, a landmark and controversial “antisemitism‑prevention” law signed by Governor Gavin Newsom in 2025 that incorporates the International Holocaust Remembrance Alliance (IHRA) definition of antisemitism into K–12 guidance, and of AB 1468, a bill that would add further "guardrails" to limit how ethnic‑studies courses may address the Israeli–Palestinian conflict. The organization has also organized annual California legislators' study trips to Israel and, in February 2024, led a post–7 October solidarity mission to Israel for a bipartisan delegation of state lawmakers.

The JPAC‑to‑Jewish California name change, after more than 50 years under the original name, coincided with heightened public scrutiny of pro‑Israel lobbying groups such as AIPAC and with a controversy in which a California Faculty Association questionnaire grouped "AIPAC/JPAC" together with industries like oil and tobacco as organizations that "harm working people", which JPAC and Jewish federations condemned as antisemitic. Jewish California's own announcement did not cite this controversy as a reason for the rebrand.

== Political positions ==
=== Pro-Israel advocacy ===
==== Strong support for California Assembly Bill 715 ====
State lawmaker Jesse Gabriel, who co‑chairs the California Legislative Jewish Caucus, a partner organization of Jewish California, has suggested that 501(c)(4) organizations may only engage in political advocacy within the scope of ‘social services organizations’; however, in practice such organizations may devote up to 50% of their expenditures to political activity. During the Gaza war, JPAC "led", through the use of its preexisting relationships with the Legislative Jewish Caucus and other allies in the California State Legislature, advocacy efforts to change California's ethnic studies curriculum through the passage of AB 715, through what it considered to be "removal of antisemitic content" such as accounts that minimize the nature and extent of antisemitic incidents and violence as determined by organizations like the ADL, comparisons of Israel with Nazi Germany and Jews or Israelis with Nazis, “dual loyalty” assertions that American Jews have loyalty to both Israel and the US or “directly or indirectly denying the right of Israel to exist." After clashing with the California Teachers Association, "the [Jewish Caucus ...] unveiled a new bill that was nearly empty of specifics of what it would do" while still creating a state Antisemitism Prevention Coordinator position. Still objecting, organizations such as the California Faculty Association described the legislation as "fail[ing] to address [antisemitism] sincerely or prudently" while "instead offer[ing] a legitimate means to surveil and censor educators in the very institutions founded on the principles of free speech and academic freedom", but this did not prevent it from being subsequently signed into law by Governor Gavin Newsom. AIPAC spokesperson Marshall Wittmann characterized the CFA's objection as “ostracizing fellow citizens who are engaged in the democratic process to strengthen the US-Israel partnership” and of discriminating against pro-Israel Americans.

===== Other supporters of the bill in its final form =====
"Dozens of Jewish organizations and advocates, including [...] the Anti-Defamation League and the Bay Area chapter of the Jewish Community Relations Council."

===== Other opponents of the bill in its final form =====
"Include ACLU California Action, the Association of California School Administrators, California County Superintendents, California School Boards Association, Council of UC Faculty Associations, Jewish Voice for Peace Bay Area chapter and the University of California Student Association, among others."

== Political and apolitical activities ==
When responding to the CFA's objection, executive director Bocarsly argued that "JPAC was an 'ethno-religious community' rather than an interest group" because it "does not make political contributions or endorse candidates[, and that] the coalition includes organizations that provide social services, help asylum seekers and give legal aid to undocumented immigrants."
