= Frank Luckel =

American politician

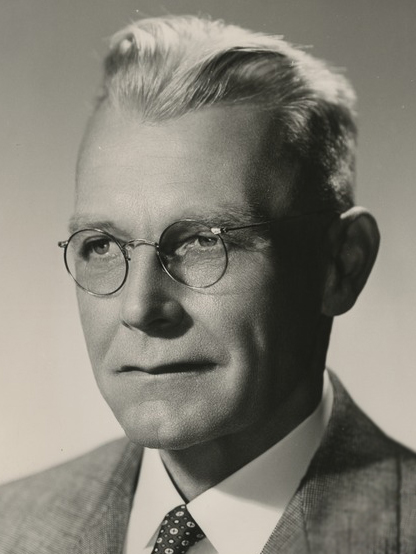

Member of the California State Assembly from the 78th district
- In office January 6, 1947 – January 7, 1963
- Preceded by: Frederick H. Kraft
- Succeeded by: E. Richard Barnes

Personal details
- Born: May 18, 1888 Los Angeles, California, U.S.
- Died: December 14, 1974 (aged 86) San Diego, California, U.S.
- Party: Republican
- Spouse: Gladys Pennell (m. 1913)
- Children: Frances Holland

Military service
- Branch/service: United States Army
- Battles/wars: World War I World War II

Frank Luckel (May 18, 1888 – December 14, 1974) served in the California State Assembly for the 78th district from 1947 to 1963 and during both World War I and World War II he served in the United States Navy.
