= Shirley Horton =

American politician (born 1952)

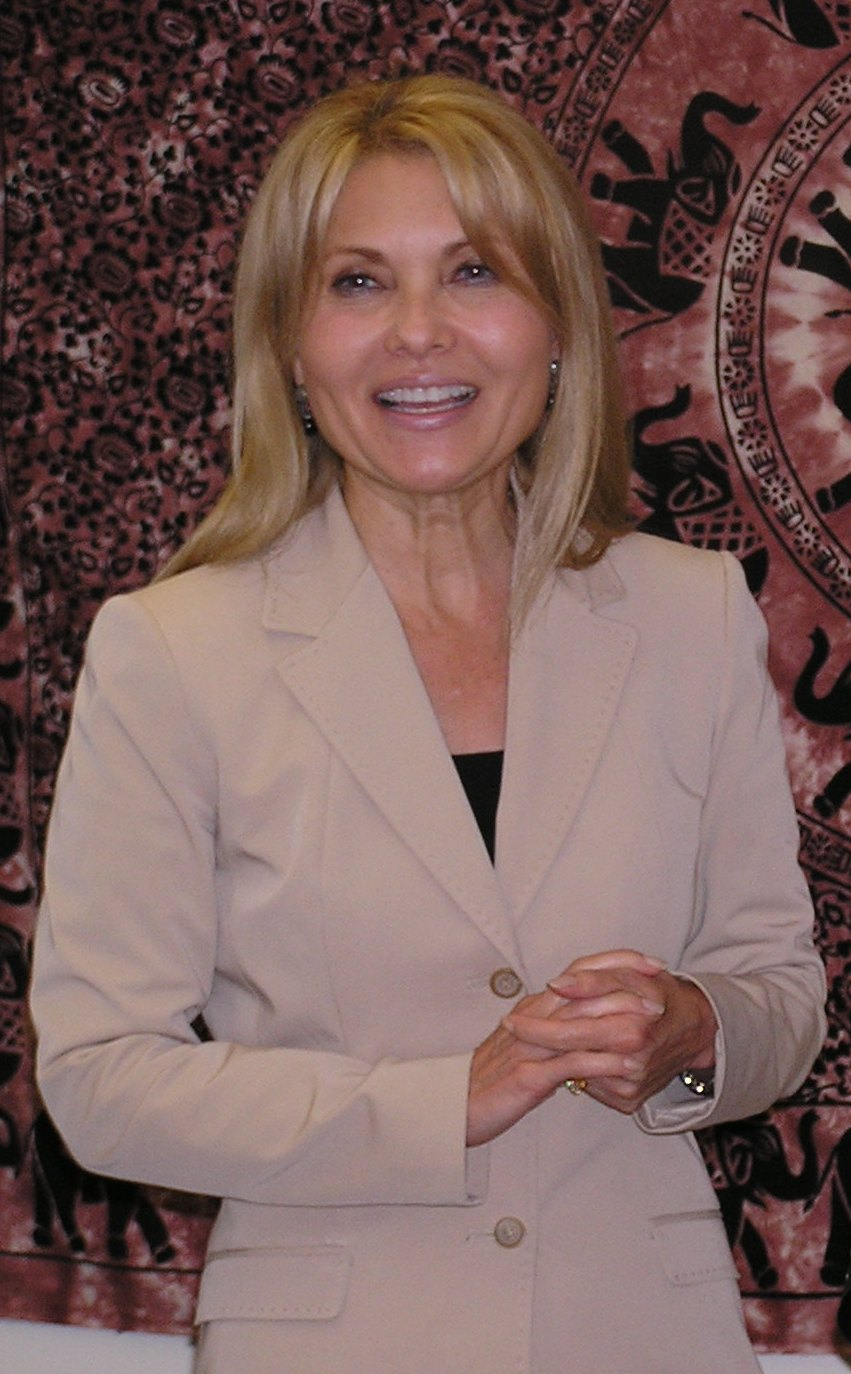

Member of the California State Assembly from the 78th district
- In office December 2, 2002 – November 30, 2008
- Preceded by: Howard Wayne
- Succeeded by: Marty Block

37th Mayor of Chula Vista, California
- In office December 1994 – 2002
- Preceded by: Tim Nader
- Succeeded by: Steve Padilla

Member of the Chula Vista city council
- In office July 9, 1991 – December 1994
- Preceded by: Tim Nader

Personal details
- Born: July 17, 1952 (age 74) Japan
- Party: Republican
- Spouse: Luther Horton
- Education: San Diego State University (MA)
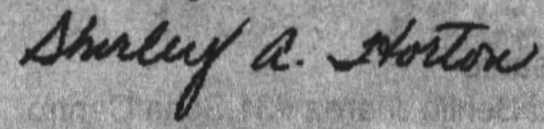
- Signature

Shirley Grasser Horton (July 17, 1952) is a Japanese–American politician who served as the 37th mayor of Chula Vista, California, and in the California State Assembly as a member of the Republican Party.

Horton was born in Japan and educated in California at Bonita Vista High School and San Diego State University. In the 1980s she served as the president of the South San Diego Bay Cities Board of Realtors before becoming active in local politics in Chula Vista when she was appointed to the city's planning commission. In 1991, she was selected to fill Tim Nader's seat and was later elected mayor in 1994. She served as mayor until she was term limited in 2002, and ran for a seat in the California State Assembly from the 78th district. She served in the assembly until she was term limited in 2008.

== Early life ==
Shirley Grasser Horton was born in Japan while her father was serving in the United States Navy. She attended Robert E. Lee Elementary School and O'Farrell Charter Middle School (then called O'Farrell Jr. High School) before graduating from Bonita Vista High School. She later graduated from San Diego State University with a master's degree.

== Career ==
=== Local politics ===
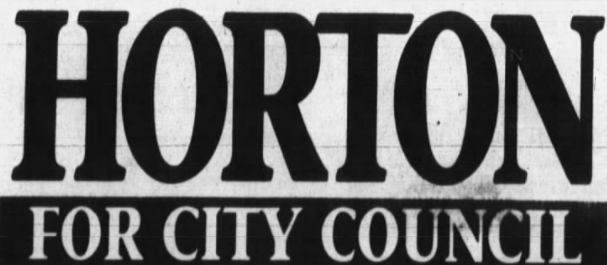
Horton's city council campaign logo

Horton was selected to serve as president of the South San Diego Bay Cities Board of Realtors to succeed Bill Gildner in 1986, and was later succeeded by Donald Hayes in 1988. She was appointed to serve as chairwoman of the Chula Vista Planning Commission in 1990.

Horton was appointed in 1991, out of twenty-seven applicants, by a unanimous vote to the Chula Vista city council to fill the vacancy created by Tim Nader's becoming mayor following the death of Mayor Gail McCandliss. She won reelection in 1992, after raising $20,746 during the campaign.

On February 14, 1994, Horton announced that she would seek the mayoral office of Chula Vista and placed first out of four candidates in the election after spending $67,422 during the campaign. She won reelection in 1998. Horton was unable to seek reelection in 2002, due to term limits.

=== California State Assembly ===
Horton announced in 2001, that she would seek election to the California State Assembly from the 78th district. She won the Republican nomination against Matt Mendoza and won in the general election against Democratic nominee Vince Hall.

During her tenure in the state assembly Horton attempted to join the Democratic Asian Pacific Islander Caucus along with two other Republican members of the state assembly.

== Later life ==
In 2009, Horton considered running for a seat in the California State Senate from the 40th district. She ran for a seat on the California Board of Equalization in 2014.

== Electoral history ==
Shirley Horton electoral history

1994 Chula Vista, California mayoral election
Party	Candidate	Votes	%
Nonpartisan	Shirley Horton	9,625	50.72%
Nonpartisan	Penny Allen	6,360	33.51%
Nonpartisan	Bob Piantedosi	1,546	8.15%
Nonpartisan	Wayne Thomas Tucker	1,447	7.62%
Total votes		11,101	100.00%

1998 Chula Vista, California mayoral election
Party	Candidate	Votes	%
Nonpartisan	Shirley Horton (incumbent)	16,539	71.95%
Nonpartisan	Carolyn A. Malcolm	2,403	10.45%
Nonpartisan	Bob Piantedosi	1,719	7.48%
Nonpartisan	Petra E. Barajas	1,712	7.45%
Nonpartisan	Everett E. Borha	614	2.67%
Total votes		22,987	100.00%

2002 California State Assembly 78th district election
Primary election
Party	Candidate	Votes	%
Republican	Shirley Horton	17,401	70.25%
Republican	Matt Mendoza	7,369	29.75%
Total votes		24,770	100.00%
General election
Republican	Shirley Horton	45,826	49.33%
Democratic	Vince Hall	44,247	47.63%
Libertarian	Mark Menanno	2,819	3.03%
Total votes		92,892	100.00%
Republican gain from Democratic			

2004 California State Assembly 78th district election
Primary election
Party	Candidate	Votes	%
Republican	Shirley Horton (incumbent)	29,554	100.00%
Total votes		29,554	100.00%
General election
Republican	Shirley Horton (incumbent)	76,886	49.05%
Democratic	Patty Davis	74,888	47.78%
Libertarian	Josh Hale	4,969	3.17%
Total votes		156,743	100.00%
Republican hold			

2006 California State Assembly 78th district election
Primary election
Party	Candidate	Votes	%
Republican	Shirley Horton (incumbent)	23,320	100.00%
Total votes		23,320	100.00%
General election
Republican	Shirley Horton (incumbent)	51,983	50.89%
Democratic	Maxine Sherard	46,846	45.86%
Libertarian	Geof Gibson	3,324	3.25%
Total votes		102,153	100.00%
Republican hold			
