= Joyce Mojonnier =

American politician

Member of the California State Assembly from the 75th district
- In office December 6, 1982 - November 30, 1990
- Preceded by: David G. Kelley
- Succeeded by: Dede Alpert

Personal details
- Born: February 17, 1943 (age 83) Detroit, Michigan, US
- Party: Republican
- Spouse: F. Erwin Mojonnier (div.)
- Children: 4

Joyce "Sunny" Mojonnier (born February 17, 1943) is an American politician who served in the California State Assembly. Mojonnier, a Republican, represented the 75th District from 1982 through 1990. She was the 30th woman elected to serve in the California legislature.

== Career ==
As the state representative of California's 75th District, Mojonnier served four consecutive two-year terms. She was defeated for reelection in 1990 by San Diego School Board Trustee Dede Alpert.

During her time in the State Assembly, Mojonnier served on a number of committees including: Rules; Ways & Means; Judiciary; Governmental Organizations; Education (and on the Subcommittee on Education Reform); Labor; Economic Development & New Technologies; and on the Subcommittee on Arts & Athletics. She chaired the Task Force on Child Abuse and the Judicial System, which she helped establish; she chaired the Joint Committee on Surrogate Parenting; and she served as vice chair for the Joint Committee on the 1992 Quincentennial. (Note: The 1992 Quincentennial was a celebration of the 500th anniversary of Christopher Columbus' 1492 arrival in America.) She was a member of the Select Committee on Genetic Diseases. She was also a member of the Arts, Tourism and Cultural Resources Committee of the National Conference of State Legislatures; and was a member of the Committee on Suggested State Legislation for the Western Legislative Conference.

While in office, Mojonnier authored or introduced a number of bills that became law. These include:

- the Hazardous Medical Waste Management Act, which served as a national model for medical waste clean-up;
- legislation to provide closed circuit television testimony for use with child witnesses involved in cases involving sexual offenses, and similar legislation for use with violent offenders to eliminate the need to transport them;
- legislation to require children's waiting rooms at courthouses, in the interest of protecting young children from unfriendly or threatening circumstances;
- and legislation requiring reflector license plates.

She also contributed to the passage of mental health legislation focused on improving patient care.

=== Other contributions ===
In 1983, while still in her first term, Mojonnier became the founder of Capitol Network, a Sacramento-based non-partisan networking group for female legislative and administrative professionals.

After leaving office, Mojonnier was appointed by Assembly Speaker Willie Brown in 1992 to serve as a commissioner on the California Medical Assistance Commission, a state office that directs and reviews proposed contracts for Medi-Cal services.

In 2014, Mojonnier founded the non-profit foundation Women In California Politics (WICP), a non-partisan organization dedicated to "preserving the political history of the women elected to serve in the California legislature." The foundation, with Mojonnier as CEO, produced Centennial Celebration, a series of events celebrating the 2018 Centennial of women being elected to serve in the California legislature. In late 2020, Mojonnier stepped down as CEO and became Chair of the WICP Board of Directors. In August 2021, the foundation opened the WICP Museum in Sacramento. This museum collects and displays—both online and at the physical space—video-recorded oral histories, as well as other historical memorabilia, collected from former female members of the California legislature. Majonnier served as a curator and historian for the museum.
