= Matt Dababneh =

American politician

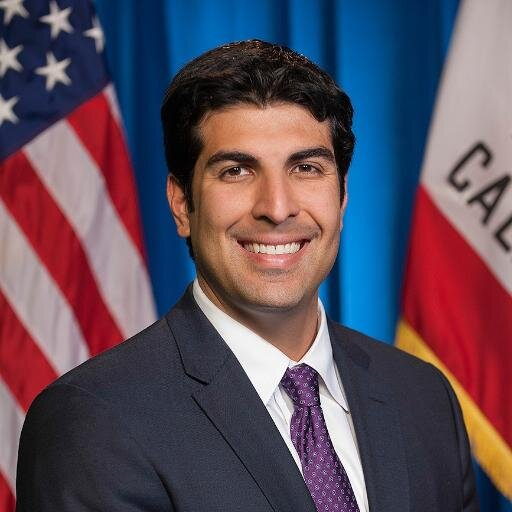
- Official portrait, 2016

Member of the California State Assembly from the 45th district
- In office January 6, 2014 – January 2, 2018
- Preceded by: Bob Blumenfield
- Succeeded by: Jesse Gabriel

Personal details
- Born: February 20, 1981 (age 45) Los Angeles, California, U.S.
- Party: Democratic
- Education: University of California, Los Angeles
- Occupation: Politician

Matt Dababneh (born February 20, 1981) is an American politician who served in the California State Assembly. A Democrat, he represented the 45th Assembly District, which encompasses most of the western San Fernando Valley.

== Early life and education ==
Dababneh was raised in the Inland Empire and graduated from La Sierra Academy in 1999. Dababneh went on to graduate from the University of California, Los Angeles, with a degree in Political Science and History. He was on the staff of the John Kerry for President campaign in 2004.

== Sexual misconduct and resignation ==
On December 4, 2017, Pamela Lopez, a Sacramento lobbyist, alleged that Dababneh sexually assaulted her. According to Lopez, in 2016 Dababneh pushed her into a Las Vegas hotel bathroom, masturbated in front of her and urged her to touch him. "I felt the weight of a body push me into the restroom." Dababneh has strongly denied the allegation, and his attorney Patricia L. Glaser, who also represents embattled film producer Harvey Weinstein, threatened to sue Lopez for defamation. "I affirmatively deny that this event ever happened," said Dababneh. "I am saddened by this lobbyist's effort... for her own self-promotion."

Jessica Y. Barker, who was Dababneh's subordinate when they both worked in US Congressman Brad Sherman's District Office, also came forward and accused Dababneh of sexual harassment. According to Barker, Dababneh regularly spoke about his sexual exploits and made degrading comments about women. She said his behavior was the main factor in her decision to leave her job as a field representative for the congressman after 18 months. She said over the course of her tenure there that Dababneh frequently made inappropriate comments at work, including talking about his sexual habits and the attire of female staffers. Two friends confirmed to The Los Angeles Times that Barker regularly told them about Dababneh's behavior and that she said it made her feel uncomfortable. According to Barker, "Pamela and I aren't the only women that Matt has harassed. There are others and I have spoken to them."

On December 5, Assembly Speaker Anthony Rendon announced that the Assembly Rules Committee would hire an outside law firm to investigate the incident described by Pamela Lopez, and Dababneh would temporarily step down as chair of the Assembly Banking and Finance Committee.

On December 8, Dababneh announced that he would resign at the end of the month. He said he didn't feel pressure to resign because of the allegations, for which he maintains his innocence, but he said he simply no longer felt passionate about lawmaking and was ready for a change.

After hearing of Dababneh's resignation, Lopez said this was only the beginning if he wanted to truly atone for his actions. She called on him to donate his 2018 campaign money (reported to be over a million dollars) to a rape crisis or trauma center. Lopez also announced that day she'd heard from several other women with allegations against Dababneh that ranged from sexual harassment to assault.

According to the Los Angeles Times, "Preliminary findings by an independent investigator hired by the Assembly Rules Committee substantiated Lopez’s allegation in June {2018}. The conclusion was based on interviews with Lopez and more than 50 witnesses. Dababneh also participated in the investigation."

In 2020, Dababneh filed a defamation suit against Lopez, alleging "anguish, fright, horror, nervousness, grief, anxiety, worry, shock, humiliation, and depression" and demanding unspecified damages. In October 2021, a California appeals court dismissed Dababneh's defamation suit against Pamela Lopez on the basis of fair reporting.

== Career ==
Prior to being elected to the state assembly, for eight years he was the district chief of staff and senior aide to United States Congressman Brad Sherman of the 30th U.S. Congressional district.

=== 2014 California State Assembly ===
Dababneh took office in January 2014, after winning the November 2013 election to complete the remaining 2014 term vacated by the 2013 resignation of Bob Blumenfield to represent Los Angeles City Council District 3. Dababneh won the seat in closely contested run-off election after finishing 329 votes ahead of his opponent. He won a full term in 2014, and secured a spot in the general election of 2016 finishing as the top vote getter in June primary with 49.24% of the vote. This came after Dababneh received more than $350,000 in outside money in support of his re-election bid. Prior to the June 2016 primary he faced criticism from local Democratic activists for positions he had taken while in office.

In March 2017, Dababneh coauthored the controversial California Senate Bill 649 which would remove a city's ability to control where the technology is placed and transfer that power to the state and is considered "an unconstitutional bill that forcibly exposes neighborhoods to constant, hazardous 4G/5G microwave radiation."

== Electoral history ==
California's 45th State Assembly district special election, 2013
Primary election
Party	Candidate	Votes	%
Democratic	Matt Dababneh	6,088	24.7
Republican	Susan Shelley	5,205	21.1
Democratic	Jeff Ebenstein	3,407	13.8
Republican	Chris Kolski	3,141	12.7
Democratic	Andra Hoffman	2,477	10.0
Democratic	Damian Carroll	1,680	6.8
Democratic	Elizabeth Badger	679	2.8
Democratic	Dennis De Young	673	2.7
Republican	Armineh Chelebian	624	2.5
No party preference	Eric Lewis	432	1.8
Democratic	Dan McCrory	262	1.1
Total votes		24,668	100.0
General election
Democratic	Matt Dababneh	14,984	50.6
Republican	Susan Shelley	14,655	49.4
Total votes		29,639	100.0
Democratic hold			

California's 45th State Assembly district election, 2014
Primary election
Party	Candidate	Votes	%
Democratic	Matt Dababneh (incumbent)	23,208	54.7
Republican	Susan Shelley	19,227	45.3
Total votes		42,435	100.0
General election
Democratic	Matt Dababneh (incumbent)	45,321	57.1
Republican	Susan Shelley	34,055	42.9
Total votes		79,376	100.0
Democratic hold			

=== 2016 California State Assembly ===
California's 45th State Assembly district election, 2016
Primary election
Party	Candidate	Votes	%
Democratic	Matt Dababneh (incumbent)	42,135	49.3
Republican	Jerry Kowal	22,899	26.8
Democratic	Doug Kriegel	20,387	23.9
Total votes		85,421	100.0
General election
Democratic	Matt Dababneh (incumbent)	111,148	66.4
Republican	Jerry Kowal	56,257	33.6
Total votes		167,405	100.0
Democratic hold			
