= E. Richard Barnes =

American politician

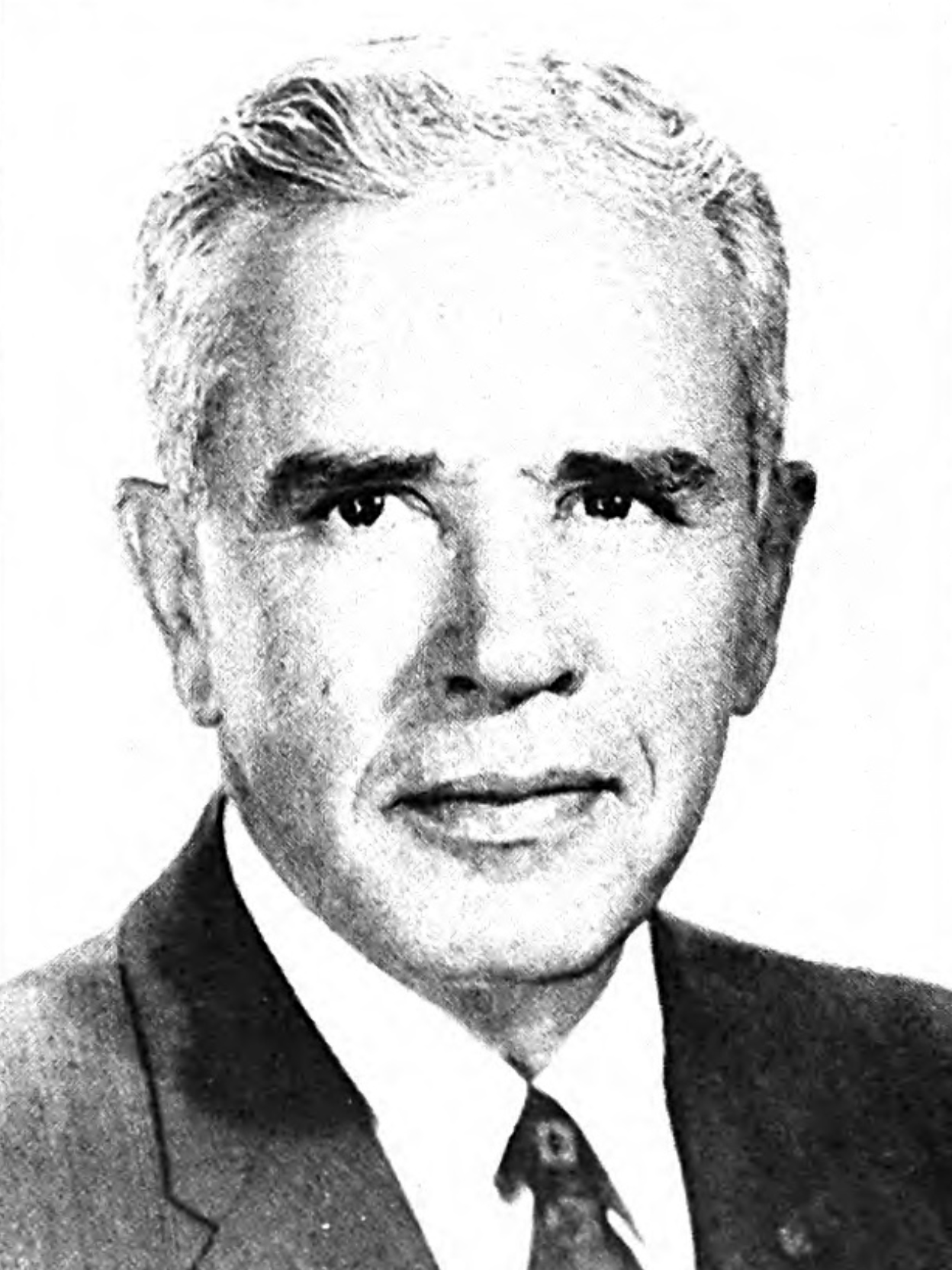

Member of the California State Assembly from the 78th district
- In office January 7, 1963 – January 8, 1973
- Preceded by: Frank Luckel
- Succeeded by: Lawrence Kapiloff

Personal details
- Born: January 4, 1906 Braham, Minnesota, U.S.
- Died: August 21, 1985 (aged 79) El Cajon, California, U.S.
- Party: Republican
- Spouse: Marvel Sundquist (m. 1929)
- Children: 5

Military service
- Branch/service: United States Navy
- Battles/wars: World War II; Korean War

Ernest Richard Barnes (January 4, 1906 – August 21, 1985) was an American politician who served in the California State Assembly for the 78th district from 1963 to 1973. During World War II, Barnes served in the United States Navy.
