= Marty Block =

American politician (born 1950)

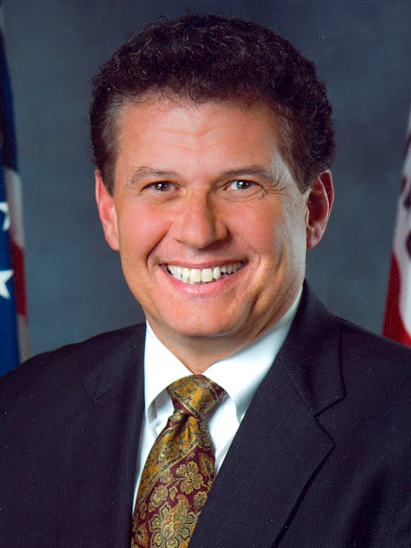

Member of the California State Senate from the 39th district
- In office December 3, 2012 – December 5, 2016
- Preceded by: Christine Kehoe
- Succeeded by: Toni Atkins

Member of the California State Assembly from the 78th district
- In office December 1, 2008 – December 3, 2012
- Preceded by: Shirley Horton
- Succeeded by: Toni Atkins

Personal details
- Born: Martin Jeffrey Block; June 28, 1950 (age 76) Chicago, Illinois, U.S.
- Party: Democratic
- Spouse: Cindy
- Children: 2
- Education: Syracuse University; Indiana University (BA); DePaul University (JD)
- Profession: Professor; Attorney

Martin Jeffrey "Marty" Block (born June 28, 1950) is an American politician who served in the California State Senate. A Democrat, he represented Senate District 39, which encompasses central San Diego County including most of the city of San Diego.

Block is the immediate past Chair of the California Legislative Jewish Caucus. Before being elected to the State Senate, he served in the California State Assembly, representing Assembly District 78 from 2008 to 2012. Before his time in the California Legislature, he was a longtime administrator and professor at San Diego State University.

== Biography ==
Block earned his B.A. in political science and education at Indiana University as well as a J.D. degree from DePaul University law school. He began his career as a history teacher in Illinois before coming to San Diego. Block retired after 26 years as a professor, dean and director at San Diego State University where he founded the National Higher Education Law and Policy Institute. He is a five-time recipient of outstanding faculty awards at San Diego State University and was presented with the University Distinguished Service Award upon retirement by SDSU President Stephen Weber.

Block has been president of both the San Diego County Board of Education and the San Diego Community College District Board of Trustees. He has frequently served as Judge Pro Tem of the San Diego Superior Court. Block’s community involvement includes time as commissioner of the San Diego County Commission on Children, Youth and Families. He also founded the San Diego Latino/Jewish Coalition and served as president of the American Jewish Committee, San Diego Chapter. Block was elected as a delegate to the Democratic National Convention four separate times in 1988, 1992, 1996, and 2004.

== California State Legislature ==
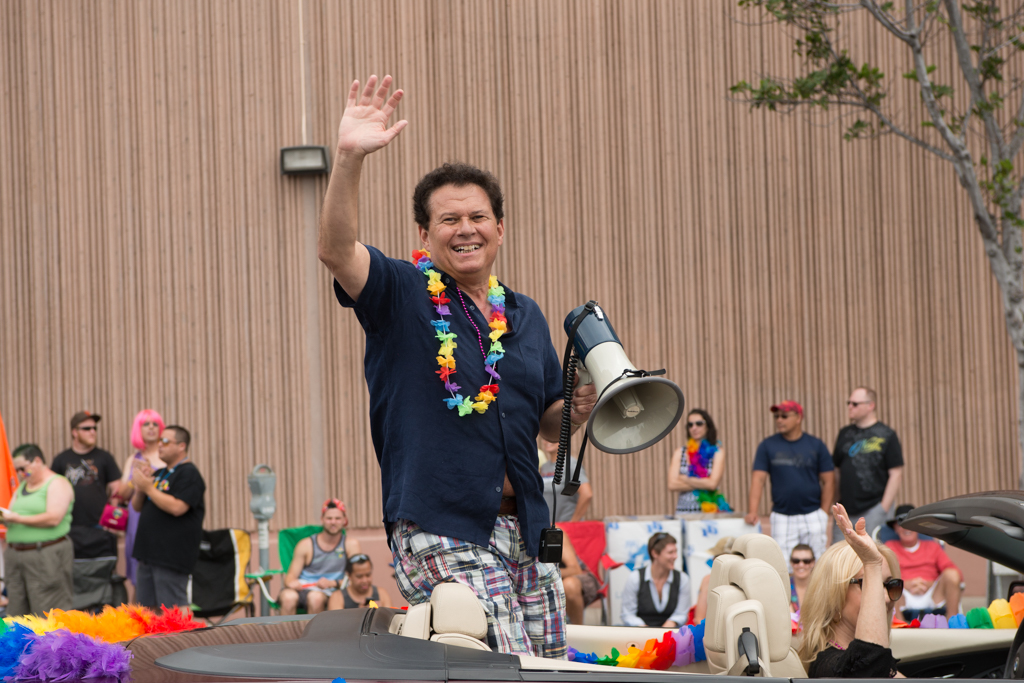
Marty Block at the 2014 San Diego LGBT Pride Parade.

=== State Assembly ===
In 2008, Block ran as a Democrat to represent California's 78th district in the California State Assembly. He received the endorsement of the San Diego Police Officer’s Association.

In 2008 Block defeated his Republican opponent, John McCann, 92,045 (55.4%) to 74,160 (44.6%). David Glanzer, the Director of Marketing and Public Relations for Comic-Con served as Marty Block's Director of Communication for the 2008 campaign and later served as Press Secretary for the Assemblyman.

In 2010 Block defeated Republican Rick L. Powell to win re-election. He completed two terms in the Assembly before leaving his Assembly seat after his successful campaign for the California 39th Senate District.

=== State Senate ===
In 2012 Block ran for State Senate in the 39th district. He defeated Republican George Plescia 58.4% to 41.6% in the November general election. He took office on December 3, 2012. He is credited with leadership for a proposal to increase funding for higher education.

In 2016, after being challenged by fellow Democrat Toni Atkins, the outgoing Speaker of the State Assembly, Block chose to not seek a second term.
