= Bob Blumenfield =

American politician (born 1967

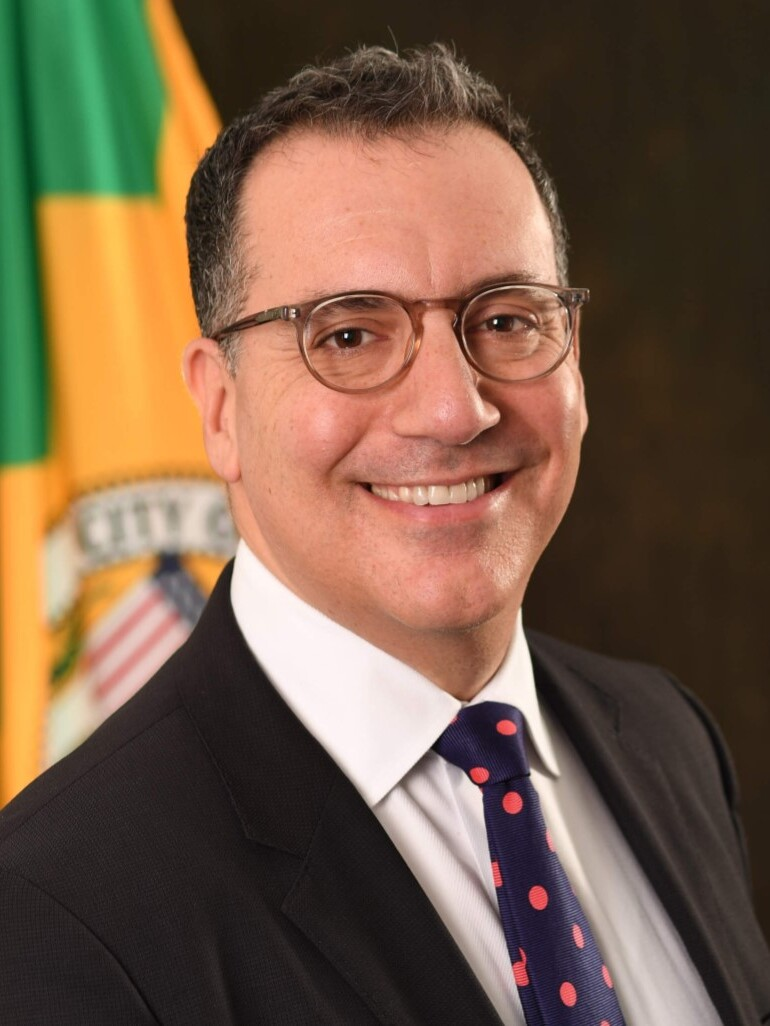
- Official portrait, 2016

President pro tempore of the Los Angeles City Council
- Incumbent
- Assumed office September 20, 2024
- Preceded by: Marqueece Harris-Dawson

Member of the Los Angeles City Council from the 3rd district
- Incumbent
- Assumed office July 1, 2013
- Preceded by: Dennis Zine

Member of the California State Assembly
- In office December 1, 2008 – June 30, 2013
- Preceded by: Lloyd E. Levine
- Succeeded by: Matt Dababneh
- Constituency: 40th district (2008–2012); 45th district (2012–2013)

Personal details
- Born: September 13, 1967 (age 59) New York City, New York, U.S.
- Party: Democratic
- Spouse: Kafi Watlington
- Children: 2
- Education: Duke University (BA); University of California, Los Angeles (MBA)
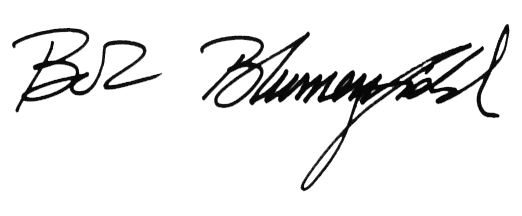
- Signature
- Website: Official website

Robert J. Blumenfield (born September 13, 1967) is an American elected official in Southern California. Blumenfield is the Los Angeles City Councilmember for the 3rd Council District which encompasses the southwestern San Fernando Valley neighborhoods of Los Angeles, including Canoga Park, Reseda, Tarzana, Winnetka, and Woodland Hills. Blumenfield took office on July 1, 2013. Blumenfield previously represented the 45th district in the California State Assembly, which also covers the southwestern San Fernando Valley.

== Early life and education ==
Blumenfield was born on September 13, 1967. He is a graduate of Duke University and the UCLA Anderson School of Management.

== Career ==
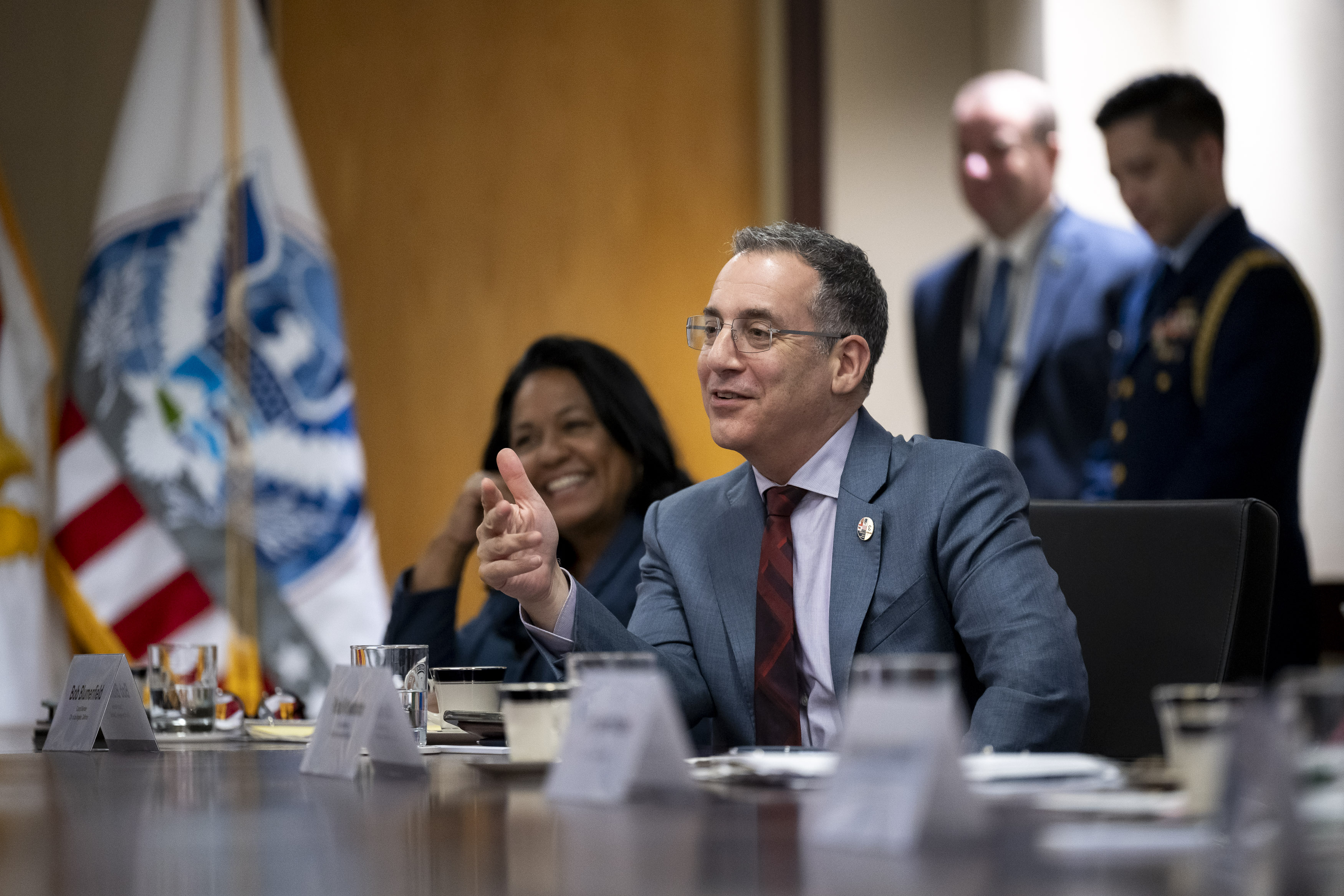
Blumenfield with other city councilmembers during a meeting with Alejandro Mayorkas, 2023.

From 1989 to 1996, he worked in Washington, D.C., as a staff person to Senator Bill Bradley, Congressman Howard Berman and as staff designee to the House Budget Committee. He later worked as Director of Government Affairs for the Santa Monica Mountains Conservancy and then as District Chief of Staff to Congressman Berman in the San Fernando Valley.

Blumenfield took office as a member the California State Assembly in 2008 after defeating Republican candidate Armineh Chelebian in the general election. During his time in the Assembly, Blumenfield represented the San Fernando Valley in District 40 and, following redistricting in 2012, District 45.

=== Los Angeles City Council ===
Blumenfield was elected to the Los Angeles City Council in March 2013. He represents the 3rd Council District, which spans the northwest portion of Los Angeles in the San Fernando Valley, including the communities of Canoga Park, Reseda, Tarzana, Winnetka and Woodland Hills.

In September 2018, Blumenfield proposed an ordinance supported by animal rights organizations and activists to ban the sale and manufacture of new fur products in Los Angeles. The ordinance was approved by the City Council and Mayor Eric Garcetti in 2019, making Los Angeles at that point the largest city in the United States to have banned fur sales. The law went into effect in 2021.

In December 2024, amid a housing shortage in Los Angeles, Blumenfield voted against a proposal to allow mid-sized mixed-income and affordable housing apartment buildings near public transit stations in some neighborhoods exclusively zoned for single-family houses. He said, "I worry about the solutions that are proposed as being a little bit too one-size-fits-all." He opposed the construction of 220 affordable housing units in Reseda, arguing "large scale apartments should not be wedged in-between single family homes by right."

== Personal life ==
Blumenfield currently lives in Woodland Hills with his wife Kafi and their two children.

Political offices
Preceded by Marqueece Harris-Dawson	President pro tempore of the Los Angeles City Council; 2024–present	Incumbent
