= California's 45th State Assembly district =

American legislative district

Current assemblymember
James Ramos; D–Highland
- Population (2020) • Voting age • Citizen voting age: 490,577; 354,848; 284,167
- Demographics: 14.90% White; 10.97% Black; 65.80% Latino; 4.78% Asian; 0.32% Native American; 0.30% Hawaiian/Pacific Islander; 0.53% other; 2.41% remainder of multiracial

California's 45th State Assembly district is one of 80 California State Assembly districts. It is currently represented by Democrat James Ramos of Highland.

== District profile ==
=== 2022 to present ===
The district currently represents the eastern area of San Bernardino County's Inland Empire. Portions of the cities of Highland, Redlands, San Bernardino, and the foothills along Interstate 210 to Rancho Cucamonga, California.

=== 2012 to 2022 ===
From 2012 to 2022, the district took up most of the western San Fernando Valley.

== Election results from statewide races ==
Year	Office	Results
2020	President	Biden 66.3 – 31.7%
2018	Governor	Newsom 67.3 – 32.7%
2018	Senator	Feinstein 62.4 – 37.6%
2016	President	Clinton 67.4 – 27.4%
2016	Senator	Harris 63.3 – 36.7%
2014	Governor	Brown 62.2 – 37.8%
2012	President	Obama 63.5 – 34.1%
2012	Senator	Feinstein 67.5 – 32.5%

== List of assembly members representing district ==
Due to redistricting, the 45th district has been moved around different parts of the state. The current iteration resulted from the 2021 redistricting by the California Citizens Redistricting Commission.

Assembly members	Party	Years served	Counties represented	Notes
Hugh K. McJunkin	Republican	January 5, 1885 – January 3, 1887	San Francisco	
William A. Brown	Republican	January 3, 1887 – January 7, 1889	San Francisco	
Henry M. Brickwedel	Republican	January 7, 1889 – January 5, 1891	San Francisco	
Eugene F. Bert	Republican	January 5, 1891 – January 2, 1893	San Francisco	
William H. Gately	Democratic	January 2, 1893 – January 7, 1895	San Francisco	
James Devitt	Republican	January 7, 1895 – January 4, 1897	San Francisco	
William H. Gately	Fusion	January 4, 1897 – January 2, 1899	San Francisco	
Eugene Sullivan	Republican	January 2, 1899 – January 1, 1901	San Francisco	
George C. Brown	Republican	January 1, 1901 – January 5, 1903	San Francisco	
George G. Boisson	Republican	January 5, 1903 – January 2, 1905	San Francisco	
Louis Strohl	Republican	January 2, 1905 – January 4, 1909	San Francisco	
Charles Lightner	Democratic	January 4, 1909 – January 2, 1911	San Francisco	
Dismo Mario Denegri	Republican	January 2, 1911 – January 6, 1913	San Francisco	
Daniel R. Hayes	Republican	January 6, 1913 – January 6, 1919	Santa Clara	
Grant R. Bennett	Republican	January 6, 1919 – January 3, 1921	Santa Clara	
Charles C. Spalding	Republican	January 3, 1921 – January 5, 1931	Santa Clara	
Lucius Powers Jr.	Republican	January 5, 1931 – January 2, 1933	Fresno	
Charles A. Hunt	Democratic	January 2, 1933 – January 2, 1939	Los Angeles	
Thomas J. Doyle	Democratic	January 2, 1939 – May 5, 1957	Los Angeles	Died in office from cancer.
Vacant		May 5, 1957 – September 5, 1957	Los Angeles	
Don Anderson	Republican	September 5, 1957 – January 5, 1959	Los Angeles	Sworn in after winning special election to fill vacant seat, after the death of Thomas Doyle.
George Brown Jr.	Democratic	January 5, 1959 – January 3, 1963	Los Angeles	Resigned, when he was sworn into Congress, after winning a congressional seat.
Vacant		January 3, 1963 – January 7, 1963	Los Angeles	
Alfred H. Song	Democratic	January 7, 1963 – January 2, 1967	Los Angeles	
Walter J. Karabian	Democratic	January 2, 1967 – November 30, 1974	Los Angeles	
Herschel Rosenthal	Democratic	December 2, 1974 – November 30, 1982	Los Angeles	
Burt M. Margolin	Democratic	December 6, 1982 – November 30, 1992	Los Angeles	
Richard Polanco	Democratic	December 7, 1992 – November 30, 1994	Los Angeles	
Antonio Villaraigosa	Democratic	December 5, 1994 – November 30, 2000	Los Angeles	
Jackie Goldberg	Democratic	December 4, 2000 – November 30, 2006	Los Angeles	
Kevin de León	Democratic	December 4, 2006 – November 30, 2010	Los Angeles	
Gil Cedillo	Democratic	December 6, 2010 – November 30, 2012	Los Angeles	
Bob Blumenfield	Democratic	December 3, 2012 – June 30, 2013	Los Angeles, Ventura	Resigned from office to be sworn in as a member of the Los Angeles City Council.
Vacant		June 30, 2013 – January 6, 2014	Los Angeles, Ventura	
Matt Dababneh	Democratic	January 6, 2014 – January 2, 2018	Los Angeles, Ventura	Sworn in after winning special election to fill vacant seat left by Blumentfield in 2014. In 2018, he resigned from office after sexual allegiations.
Vacant		January 2, 2018 – June 11, 2018	Los Angeles, Ventura	
Jesse Gabriel	Democratic	June 11, 2018 – November 30, 2022	Los Angeles, Ventura	Sworn in after winning special election.
James Ramos	Democratic	December 5, 2022 – present	San Bernardino	Formally of the 40th district prior to 2021 redistricting process.

== Election results (1990–present) ==
=== 2024 ===
2024 California State Assembly 45th district election
Primary election
Party	Candidate	Votes	%
Democratic	James Ramos (incumbent)	31,826	99.0
Republican	Scott Olson (write-in)	334	1.0
Total votes		32,160	100.0
General election
Democratic	James Ramos (incumbent)	87,062	63.8
Republican	Scott Olson	49,304	36.2
Total votes		136,366	100.0
Democratic hold			

=== 2022 ===
2022 California State Assembly 45th district election
Primary election
Party	Candidate	Votes	%
Democratic	James Ramos (incumbent)	26,402	64.1
Republican	Joseph Martinez	14,783	35.9
Total votes		41,185	100.0
General election
Democratic	James Ramos (incumbent)	45,194	60.7
Republican	Joseph Martinez	29,209	39.3
Total votes		74,403	100.0
Democratic hold			

=== 2020 ===
2020 California State Assembly 45th district election
Primary election
Party	Candidate	Votes	%
Democratic	Jesse Gabriel (incumbent)	77,512	98.8
Republican	Jeffi Girgenti (write-in)	955	1.2
Democratic	Denise Feldman (write-in)	23	0.0
Total votes		78,490	100.0
General election
Democratic	Jesse Gabriel (incumbent)	136,904	66.2
Republican	Jeffi Girgenti	69,802	33.8
Total votes		206,706	100.0
Democratic hold			

=== 2018 ===
2018 California State Assembly 45th district election
Primary election
Party	Candidate	Votes	%
Democratic	Jesse Gabriel	31,068	43.7
Republican	Justin M. Clark	22,709	31.9
Democratic	Tricia Robbins Kasson	5,277	7.4
Democratic	Ankur Patel	4,534	6.4
Democratic	Jeff Bornstein	4,039	5.7
Democratic	Daniel Brin	2,432	3.4
Democratic	Ray Bishop	1,088	1.5
Total votes		71,147	100.0
General election
Democratic	Jesse Gabriel (incumbent) (Note: Candidate was not an incumbent during the primary but was an incumbent in the general election after winning the special election for the seat. The special election was held on the same day as the primary.)	107,757	70.3
Republican	Justin M. Clark	45,619	29.7
Total votes		153,376	100.0
Democratic hold			

=== 2018 (special) ===
2018 California State Assembly 46th district special election Vacancy resulting from the resignation of Matt Dababneh
Primary election
Party	Candidate	Votes	%
Democratic	Jesse Gabriel	10,632	32.7
Republican	Justin M. Clark	8,172	25.1
Democratic	Tricia Robbins Kasson	5,507	16.9
Democratic	Ankur Patel	3,698	11.4
No party preference	Dennis Zine	2,491	7.7
Democratic	David Brin	752	2.3
Democratic	Raymond J. Bishop	685	2.1
Democratic	Jeff Bornstein	590	1.8
Democratic	C.R. Cochrane (write-in)	7	0.0
Total votes		32,534	100.0
General election
Democratic	Jesse Gabriel	46,168	65.7
Republican	Justin M. Clark	24,109	34.3
Total votes		70,277	100.0
Democratic hold			

=== 2016 ===
2016 California State Assembly 45th district election
Primary election
Party	Candidate	Votes	%
Democratic	Matt Dababneh (incumbent)	42,135	49.3
Republican	Jerry Kowal	22,899	26.8
Democratic	Doug Kriegel	20,387	23.9
Total votes		85,421	100.0
General election
Democratic	Matt Dababneh (incumbent)	111,148	66.4
Republican	Jerry Kowal	56,257	33.6
Total votes		167,405	100.0
Democratic hold			

=== 2014 ===
2014 California State Assembly 45th district election
Primary election
Party	Candidate	Votes	%
Democratic	Matt Dababneh (incumbent)	23,208	54.7
Republican	Susan Shelley	19,227	45.3
Total votes		42,435	100.0
General election
Democratic	Matt Dababneh (incumbent)	45,321	57.1
Republican	Susan Shelley	34,055	42.9
Total votes		79,376	100.0
Democratic hold			

=== 2013 (special) ===
2013 California State Assembly 45th district special election Vacancy resulting from the resignation of Bob Blumenfield
Primary election
Party	Candidate	Votes	%
Democratic	Matt Dababneh	6,088	24.7
Republican	Susan Shelley	5,205	21.1
Democratic	Jeff Ebenstein	3,407	13.8
Republican	Chris Kolski	3,141	12.7
Democratic	Andra Hoffman	2,477	10.0
Democratic	Damian Carroll	1,680	6.8
Democratic	Elizabeth Badger	679	2.8
Democratic	Dennis De Young	673	2.7
Republican	Armineh Chelebian	624	2.5
No party preference	Eric Lewis	432	1.8
Democratic	Dan McCrory	262	1.1
Total votes		24,668	100.0
General election
Democratic	Matt Dababneh	14,984	50.6
Republican	Susan Shelley	14,655	49.4
Total votes		29,639	100.0
Democratic hold			

=== 2012 ===
2012 California State Assembly 45th district election
Primary election
Party	Candidate	Votes	%
Democratic	Bob Blumenfield (incumbent)	31,942	59.1
Republican	Chris Kolski	22,119	40.9
Total votes		54,061	100.0
General election
Democratic	Bob Blumenfield (incumbent)	100,422	63.4
Republican	Chris Kolski	57,996	36.6
Total votes		158,418	100.0
Democratic hold			

=== 2010 ===
2010 California State Assembly 45th district election
Party	Candidate	Votes	%
Democratic	Gil Cedillo	53,745	83.4
Republican	Suzanne Ovilos	10,724	16.6
Total votes		64,469	100.0
Democratic hold			

=== 2008 ===
2008 California State Assembly 45th district election
Party	Candidate	Votes	%
Democratic	Kevin de León (incumbent)	70,869	82.0
Republican	Phillip Alexander	15,506	18.0
Total votes		86,375	100.0
Democratic hold			

=== 2006 ===
2006 California State Assembly 45th district election
Party	Candidate	Votes	%
Democratic	Kevin de León	45,106	83.2
Republican	Samantha Allen-Newman	9,082	16.8
Total votes		54,188	100.0
Democratic hold			

=== 2004 ===
2004 California State Assembly 45th district election
Party	Candidate	Votes	%
Democratic	Jackie Goldberg (incumbent)	62,091	76.0
Republican	Oscar A. Gutierrez	19,660	24.0
Total votes		81,751	100.0
Democratic hold			

=== 2002 ===
2002 California State Assembly 45th district election
Party	Candidate	Votes	%
Democratic	Jackie Goldberg (incumbent)	40,341	85.6
Libertarian	Judy Chau Phuong Cook	6,799	14.4
Total votes		47,140	100.0
Democratic hold			

=== 2000 ===
2000 California State Assembly 45th district election
Party	Candidate	Votes	%
Democratic	Jackie Goldberg	57,092	100.0
Total votes		57,092	100.0
Democratic hold			

=== 1998 ===
1998 California State Assembly 45th district election
Party	Candidate	Votes	%
Democratic	Antonio Villaraigosa (incumbent)	40,001	82.2
Republican	Kitty Hedrick	8,666	17.8
Total votes		48,667	100.0
Democratic hold			

=== 1996 ===
1996 California State Assembly 45th district election
Party	Candidate	Votes	%
Democratic	Antonio Villaraigosa (incumbent)	40,332	78.2
Peace and Freedom	Jaime Luis Gomez	11,219	21.8
Total votes		51,551	100.0
Democratic hold			

=== 1994 ===
1994 California State Assembly 45th district election
Party	Candidate	Votes	%
Democratic	Antonio Villaraigosa	29,533	65.0
Republican	Robert K. Jung	12,702	28.0
Libertarian	Pam Probst	3,195	7.0
Total votes		45,430	100.0
Democratic hold			

=== 1992 ===
1992 California State Assembly 45th district election
Party	Candidate	Votes	%
Democratic	Richard Polanco (incumbent)	37,196	64.6
Republican	Kitty Hedrick	15,028	26.1
Libertarian	Jaime Luis Gomez	5,349	9.3
Total votes		57,573	100.0
Democratic hold			

=== 1990 ===
1990 California State Assembly 45th district election
Party	Candidate	Votes	%
Democratic	Burt Margolin (incumbent)	50,494	65.2
Republican	Elizabeth Michael	22,470	29.0
Peace and Freedom	Owen Staley	4,527	5.8
Total votes		77,491	100.0
Democratic hold			

== See also ==
- California State Assembly
- California State Assembly districts
- Districts in California
