= Jeanette Daley =

State legislator in California and business person

Jeanette E. Daley (c. 1896 - November 1960) was a business person and a state legislator in California. A Democrat, she was elected in 1936, 1938, and 1940. She represented the 78th Assembly District. She was the first woman elected to the state legislature from San Diego. University of California San Diego has a photo of her.

She served on a committee investigating the State Relief Administration in 1940.

After divorcing her husband, George R. Daley, she moved to Phoenix, Arizona in 1945 where she was president of Daley Investment Company and involved in the construction business.
