= California's 39th district =

California's 39th district may refer to:

- California's 39th congressional district
- California's 39th State Assembly district
- California's 39th State Senate district
