= Senator Hulse =

Senator Hulse may refer to:

- Amber Hulse (born 1998), South Dakota State Senate
- Ben Hulse (1894–1961), California State Senate
- Merlin Hulse (born 1923), Iowa State Senate
