= Lawrence W. Stirling =

American politician and judge in California (born 1942)

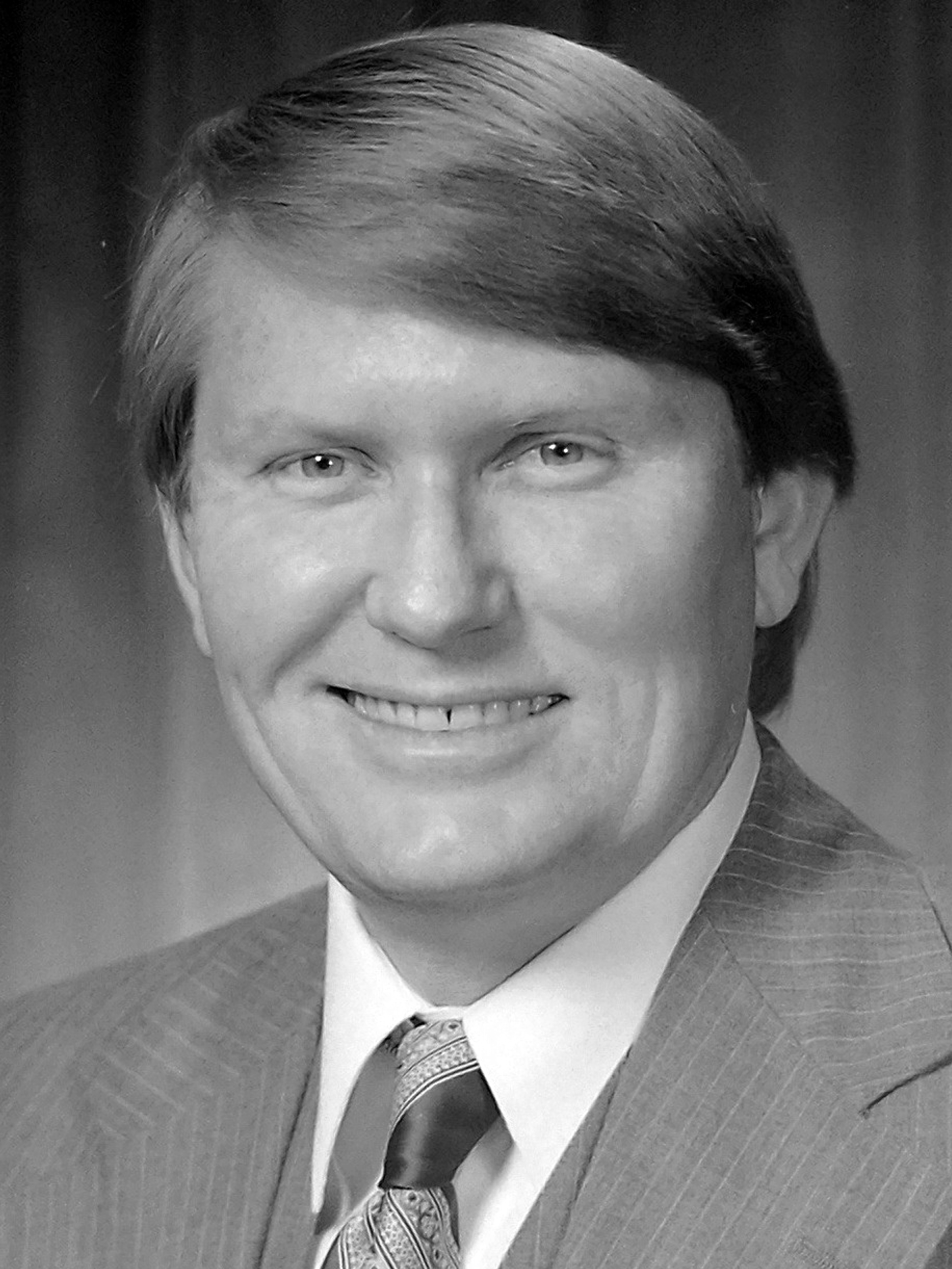
- Official portrait, 1977

Member of the California Senate from the 39th district
- In office December 5, 1988 – September 29, 1989
- Preceded by: James L. Ellis
- Succeeded by: Lucy Killea

Member of the California State Assembly from the 77th district
- In office December 1, 1980 – November 30, 1988
- Preceded by: James L. Ellis
- Succeeded by: Carol Bentley Ellis

Member of the San Diego City Council
- In office 1977–1980

Personal details
- Born: February 20, 1942 (age 84); Youngstown, Ohio
- Party: Republican
- Children: 2

Lawrence W. Stirling (born February 20, 1942) is a former US Army Infantry Major who was a member of the San Diego City Council, the California State Assembly, and the California State Senate, as well as a former municipal court judge and now a Retired San Diego County Superior Court Judge.

Upon retirement from the bench, Stirling became the Senior Partner in the Adams-Stirling Law Firm based in Los Angeles and is admitted to practice before both the California and United States Supreme Courts.

While serving as a member of the California State Assembly, Stirling authored the Davis-Stirling Common Interest Development Act which governs condominium, cooperative, and planned unit development communities in California.

He also enacted over 200 pieces of legislation.

Stirling is also the author of three books: Asked and Answered, a book on court-room evidence; Leading at a Higher Level, a book on the history of San Diego City; The Noblest Motive, a text book of public administration. He is also the author of Making Sense of It, a column that can be found in the San Diego Daily Transcript Newspaper Archives.
