= Eucharist denial to Catholic politicians over abortion =

Because the Catholic Church opposes abortion as a matter of doctrine, some Catholic bishops have refused or threatened to refuse communion, or threatened to declare excommunication upon Catholic politicians who support abortion rights. In some cases, officials have stated that ministers should refuse communion to such politicians per canon 915 of the 1983 Code of Canon Law; elsewhere, that the politicians should, on their own, refrain from receiving communion ad normam canon 916; and in other cases, excommunication has been suggested.

== United States ==
=== General statements ===
In 2004, there was discussion of whether communion should be refused to American Catholic politicians who voted against laws banning abortion. With a few American bishops in favor of withholding communion from politicians and the majority against, the United States Conference of Catholic Bishops decided that such matters should be decided on a case-by-case basis by the individual bishops. In 2005, Bishop Donald Wuerl of Pittsburgh said no individual bishop should on his own deny communion to politicians because of "national ramifications", and suggested that such an action should be taken only on the basis of a two-thirds majority of all of the bishops or as mandated by the Vatican, while bishops Thomas Olmsted of Phoenix and Charles J. Chaput of Denver stated they would act on their own initiative and apply the sanctions put forward by a 2004 USCCB document entitled "Catholics in Political Life", though only, Chaput declared, in "extraordinary cases of public scandal". In 2008, Raymond Burke, former archbishop of St. Louis and assigned in that year to the Vatican, said communion should not be given to such politicians, arguing that support for abortion is a mortal sin that makes a person unfit for communion, and denial of communion would prevent other Catholics from thinking, because they see that pro-abortion politicians can receive communion, that being pro-abortion is an acceptable political position.

In 2008, a minority of American bishops supported denying communion to pro-abortion rights Catholic legislators, interpreting canon 915 as justifying such action. In 2009, Wuerl argued that communion was not intended to be used as a weapon and that a pastoral approach would be more effective for changing minds than a canonical one.

These statements of intent from church authorities have sometimes led American Catholic voters to vote for candidates who wish to ban abortion, rather than pro-abortion candidates who support other Catholic Church positions on issues such as war, health care, immigration, or lowering the abortion rate. Penalties of this kind from bishops have generally targeted Democrats, possibly because pro-abortion Catholic Democrats are more vocal in their support for abortion than the few pro-abortion Catholic Republicans.

Proposals to deny communion to pro-abortion politicians are more common in the United States. Suggested reasons for this are a politicization of pastoral practice.

While there was thus disagreement among the bishops about the opportuneness of refusing the Eucharist to Catholic politicians promoting legalization of abortion, there was unanimity regarding the moral obligation of Catholic politicians who participate in what their Church considers a seriously sinful action to refrain from going to Communion, an obligation stated on several occasions.

=== Main instances ===
==== 20th century ====
The first instance of a pro-abortion rights politician being censured via denial of communion was in 1989. During a special election for the California Senate, Pro-abortion rights Catholic Lucy Killea was barred from communion by Leo Thomas Maher, then bishop of San Diego. She received communion in Sacramento with the consent of Bishop Francis Quinn. The incident brought publicity to Killea's candidacy and gained her the voters' sympathy, helping her to win the election.

In 1984, Cardinal John Joseph O'Connor, then archbishop of New York, considered excommunicating New York Governor Mario Cuomo. He also condemned Cuomo's statements that support for abortion rights did not contradict Catholic teaching, but did not suggest that Cuomo should stop receiving communion.

==== 21st century ====
In January 2003, Bishop William Weigand of Sacramento said Governor of California Gray Davis, a Catholic who supported abortion rights, should stop receiving communion.

In 2004, then-Archbishop Burke said he would not give communion to 2004 presidential candidate and Senator John Kerry, in part because of his position on abortion. According to religion experts, such a denial of communion would have been unprecedented. Kerry's own Archbishop Sean O'Malley refused to specify the applicability of his earlier statement that such Catholics are in a state of grave sin and cannot properly receive communion. The issue led to comparisons between Kerry's presidential campaign and that of John F. Kennedy in 1960. While Kennedy had to demonstrate his independence from the Roman Catholic Church due to public fear that a Catholic president would make decisions based on the Holy See's agenda, it seemed that Kerry, in contrast, had to show obedience to Catholic authorities in order to win votes. According to Margaret Ross Sammons, Kerry's campaign was sufficiently damaged by the threat to withhold communion that it may have cost him the election. Sammons argues that President George W. Bush was able to win 53% of the Catholic vote because he appealed to "traditional" Catholics.

In 2004, Senator Dick Durbin was prohibited from receiving the Eucharist in his home diocese of Springfield due to his persistent record of supporting legal abortion. In 2019, two other Catholics, Illinois House speaker Mike Madigan and Illinois Senate President John Cullerton, were banned from receiving the Eucharist.

In February 2007, as emerged two and a half years later, Bishop Thomas Tobin asked Representative Patrick Kennedy not to take communion because of his position on abortion. Kennedy told the Providence Journal that Tobin also instructed priests in the diocese not to give him communion; Tobin denied this. In 2007, Burke said that he would deny communion to 2008 Republican presidential candidate Rudy Giuliani because of his views on abortion, and that Giuliani should not seek the sacrament. In May 2008, Kansas City, Kansas Archbishop Joseph Naumann said that then-Kansas Gov. Kathleen Sebelius should stop receiving communion because of her support for abortion rights, and that she should not again take it unless she publicly stated that she opposed abortion rights.

After Joe Biden was nominated as a vice presidential candidate in the 2008 presidential election, Bishop Joseph Francis Martino of Biden's hometown of Scranton, Pennsylvania, said Biden would be refused communion in that diocese because of his support for abortion. Biden was not refused communion in his then-parish of Wilmington, Delaware.

In October 2019, Biden was refused communion by a priest at a church in Florence, South Carolina. The priest indicated that he had followed a diocesan policy enacted in 2004. The bishop of Biden's home diocese in Wilmington, Delaware, W. Francis Malooly, said that he would not refuse communion in cases such as this. On January 21, 2021, one day after his inauguration as president, Biden received communion from the hands of the archbishop of Washington, DC, Cardinal Wilton Daniel Gregory. The event was condemned by conservative activist Austin Ruse, in Crisis magazine. In October of the same year, Biden stated that during a meeting with pope Francis, "We just talked about the fact he was happy that I was a good Catholic and I should keep receiving Communion".

In July 2021, New Mexico state senator Joe Cervantes was denied communion. Cervantes had cosponsored legislation to repeal New Mexico's dormant ban on abortion except in cases of rape, incest, or the life of the mother was in danger.

On 20 May 2022 Archbishop Salvatore Cordileone of the San Francisco archdiocese wrote in a public notice that Nancy Pelosi would be refused the Holy Communion due to her position on abortion. Three Catholic bishops of the US supported Cordileone's decision. In response to Cordileone's notice, Pelosi stated she supported the right of abortion, and added: "I wonder about the death penalty, which I am opposed to. So is the Church. But they take no action against people who may not share their view".

== Europe ==
In Europe, Catholic bishops have less often raised the question of refusing communion to pro-abortion rights Catholic legislators: there "rigorous principles coexist with more flexible pastoral customs". In January 2001, Pope John Paul II gave Communion to Mayor of Rome Francesco Rutelli, whose position is that of being "personally opposed to abortion, but not willing to impose his stance through law". Similar cases are found among parliamentarians in Austria, Belgium and Germany. When the Spanish Parliament voted to liberalize that country's abortion laws in 2010, the Bishops Conference declared that the parliamentarians who chose to vote for the new law were not excommunicated, but that they "seriously separated themselves from the church and should not receive Communion." King Juan Carlos, who was constitutionally required to sign the law, did not fall under any church sanctions.

=== Ireland ===
While the Oireachtas was debating the Protection of Life During Pregnancy Act 2013, which provided for abortion in limited cases, members of the Irish Catholic Bishops' Conference expressed differing positions. Eamon Martin, then coadjutor archbishop of Armagh, said that pro-abortion rights politicians should not seek communion and were excommunicated. Diarmuid Martin, archbishop of Dublin, was asked for comment on Martin's statements, and responded that communion should not be a site of debate or used for publicity reasons. Cardinal Seán Brady remarked that, among the bishops, "there would be a great reluctance to politicize the Eucharist".

In July 2024, Colm Burke was refused communion during the funeral Mass of a constituent in Whitechurch by a curate who cited Eamon Martin's statement on excommunication. Burke wrote to William Crean, the Bishop of Cloyne, for comment. The Irish Association of Catholic Priests condemned the curate's action.

== Holy See ==
Recent popes have presided over Masses at which pro-abortion rights politicians have been given communion on many occasions. Pope John Paul II gave communion to Tony Blair, at the time both a pro-abortion-rights politician and an Anglican, as well as to Rome Mayor Francesco Rutelli. At a Mass in St. Patrick's Cathedral in New York City in 2008 celebrated by Pope Benedict XVI, pro-abortion-rights Catholic politicians Nancy Pelosi, John Kerry, and Rudy Giuliani received the sacrament. Italian politician Nichi Vendola has also taken the Eucharist at a Mass celebrated by Benedict.

== Mexico ==
In May 2007, Pope Benedict XVI expressed support for the Mexican bishops' envisaged excommunication of politicians who had voted to legalize abortion in Mexico City. Responding to a journalist's question, "Do you agree with the excommunications given to legislators in Mexico City on the question?" the Pope said, "Yes. The excommunication was not something arbitrary. It is part of the (canon law) code. It is based simply on the principle that the killing of an innocent human child is incompatible with going in Communion with the body of Christ. Thus, they (the bishops) didn't do anything new or anything surprising. Or arbitrary."

According to Der Spiegel, many journalists were wondering if that support could be interpreted as a wish to excommunicate such politicians. Time magazine reported that it was in fact such a declaration. However, church officials said that it was not a declaration but appeared to be a misunderstanding. Federico Lombardi, director of the Holy See Press Office, clarified that the Pope was not excommunicating anyone since the Mexican bishops had not in fact declared an excommunication. However, Lombardi said that "politicians who vote in favor of abortion should not receive the sacrament of Holy Communion" because their action is "incompatible with participation in the Eucharist."

== Uruguay ==
In 2012, various news outlets reported that all of the Catholic legislators who supported the decriminalization of abortion in Uruguay had been excommunicated by the country's conference of bishops. That was the result of a misunderstanding and the secretary-general of the conference of bishops later said that the penalty of automatic excommunication applies to those who are directly involved in an abortion, "which does not include those who vote for a law that allows it."

== View of Church Leaders ==
Individual church leaders have given differing views on denial. Cardinal Francis Arinze supports doing so saying:

...somebody votes for the killing of unborn babies, and says, I voted for that, I will vote for that every time and these babies are killed, not one or two, but in millions, and that person says I am a practicing Catholic, should that person receive communion next Sunday... The children for first communion will answer that at the drop of a hat. You don’t need a cardinal to answer that.”

Cardinal Peter Turkson opposes denial saying, "The Eucharist should not in any way become a weapon.”
