= W. Don MacGillivray =

American politician

Member of the California State Assembly from the 36th district
- In office January 6, 1969 - November 30, 1974
- Preceded by: Winfield A. Shoemaker
- Succeeded by: John Kenyon MacDonald

Personal details
- Born: August 13, 1919 Los Angeles, California
- Died: September 13, 1994 (aged 75)
- Party: Republican
- Spouse: Mary Lee Dunham (m. 1943)
- Children: 2

Military service
- Branch/service: United States Navy
- Battles/wars: World War II

William Donald MacGillivray (August 13, 1919 – September 13, 1994) served in the California State Assembly for the 36th district from 1969 to 1974. During World War II he also served in the United States Navy. During the Reagan Administration, he served as a Member of the National Capital Planning Commission. He also served as a Member on the National Highway Safety Advisory Committee also under Ronald Reagan. He was a member of the Democratic party until 1962, then he became a Republican.
