= Steve Fox (politician) =

American politician

Member of the California State Assembly from the 36th district
- In office December 3, 2012 – December 1, 2014
- Preceded by: Steve Knight
- Succeeded by: Tom Lackey

Personal details
- Born: Steven Gregory Fox; January 27, 1953 (age 73) Boyle Heights, California, U.S.
- Party: Republican before 2012, 2026-present
- Other political affiliations: Democratic (2012-2026)
- Spouse: Sharon Fox
- Children: 2
- Occupation: Lawyer, Politician

Steve Fox is an American politician and former member of the California State Assembly. A Democrat, Fox represented the 36th district, encompassing much of the Antelope Valley and Santa Clarita Valley, as well as small portions of Kern County and San Bernardino County. Prior to being elected to the state Assembly, he worked as a public school teacher, an attorney, and trustee of Antelope Valley College. Fox formerly served as a governing board member of the Antelope Valley Hospital. Fox ran for Assembly in 2008 as a Republican and lost the Republican primary to Steve Knight, who went on to win the general election. Fox later switched his political affiliation and became a Democrat.

Fox won his seat in 2012 by only 145 votes over his Republican opponent, Lancaster City Councilman Ron Smith. He became the first Democrat to win election to the legislature in the area in 36 years, despite having been outspent in the election by more than 12-to-one. In 2014, Fox sought a second term to the state Assembly, losing to Palmdale City Councilman Tom Lackey by a 60% to 40% margin.

Fox ran again for the state Assembly against Lackey in 2016, however he lost by a 54% to 46% margin.

Fox sought another rematch against Lackey in 2018. He lost again, but by a smaller margin than in the previous two elections.

Fox sought another rematch against Lackey in 2020. He lost by a wider margin than in the prior two campaigns.

In 2022, Fox sought election to the California State Assembly in the newly drawn 39th District. He was defeated in the primary by a wide margin.

== Lawsuits and settlements ==
Fox was charged with sexually harassing two female employees in 2014 while in the State Assembly. A former legislative director claimed that he exposed himself to her when she drove to his residence to give him a ride to work, that she was asked to perform non-legislative related tasks for Fox, and that she was fired when she reported his behavior. In October 2017, the California State Assembly paid $100,000 to the plaintiff to settle the case.

A second former aide charged that he forced her to work on his campaigns and for his law firm without pay while she was employed on his staff, though she didn't accuse him of sexual misconduct. The State Assembly paid $110,000 settlement in 2015 to settle the lawsuit.

== California State Assembly ==
=== 2012 election ===
California's 36th State Assembly district election, 2012
Primary election
Party	Candidate	Votes	%
Republican	Ron Smith	15,097	35.1
Democratic	Steve Fox	14,160	32.9
Republican	Tom Lackey	13,795	32.0
Total votes		43,052	100.0
General election
Democratic	Steve Fox	66,005	50.1
Republican	Ron Smith	65,860	49.9
Total votes		131,865	100.0
Democratic gain from Republican			

=== 2014 election ===
California's 36th State Assembly district election, 2014
Primary election
Party	Candidate	Votes	%
Republican	Tom Lackey	15,095	41.1
Democratic	Steve Fox (incumbent)	12,055	32.8
Republican	JD Kennedy	4,460	12.2
Republican	Suzette M. Martinez	3,390	9.2
Democratic	Kermit F. Franklin	1,706	4.6
Total votes		36,706	100.0
General election
Republican	Tom Lackey	42,107	60.2
Democratic	Steve Fox (incumbent)	27,866	39.8
Total votes		69,973	100.0
Republican gain from Democratic			

=== 2016 election ===
California's 36th State Assembly district election, 2016
Primary election
Party	Candidate	Votes	%
Republican	Tom Lackey (incumbent)	35,019	48.2
Democratic	Steve Fox	21,541	29.6
Democratic	Darren W. Parker	11,236	15.5
Democratic	Ollie M. McCaulley	4,891	6.7
Total votes		72,687	100.0
General election
Republican	Tom Lackey (incumbent)	77,801	53.1
Democratic	Steve Fox	68,755	46.9
Total votes		146,556	100.0
Republican hold			

=== 2018 election ===
California's 36th State Assembly district election, 2018
Primary election
Party	Candidate	Votes	%
Republican	Tom Lackey (incumbent)	35,628	60.3
Democratic	Steve Fox	23,447	39.7
Total votes		59,075	100.0
General election
Republican	Tom Lackey (incumbent)	66,584	52.1
Democratic	Steve Fox	61,310	47.9
Total votes		127,894	100.0
Republican hold			

=== 2020 election ===
2020 California's 36th State Assembly district election
Primary election
Party	Candidate	Votes	%
Republican	Tom Lackey (incumbent)	45,255	53.0
Democratic	Steve Fox	14,771	17.3
Democratic	Johnathon Ervin	6,615	7.8
Democratic	Diedra M. Greenaway	5,084	6.0
Democratic	Michael P. Rives	4,055	4.8
Democratic	Ollie M. McCaulley	3,729	4.4
Democratic	Lourdes Everett	3,405	4.0
Democratic	Eric Andrew Ohlsen	2,440	2.9
Total votes		85,354	100.0
General election
Republican	Tom Lackey (incumbent)	102,442	55.2
Democratic	Steve Fox	83,240	44.8
Total votes		185,680	100.0
Republican hold			

=== District 39 ===
2022 California's 39th State Assembly district election
Primary election
Party	Candidate	Votes	%
Republican	Paul Andre Marsh	13,572	38.1
Democratic	Juan Carrillo	10,706	30.0
Democratic	Andrea Rosenthal	7,746	21.7
Democratic	Steve Fox	3,615	10.1
Total votes		35,639	100.0

== Personal life ==
Fox and his wife Sharon, a retired school teacher, have been married for 32 years. They have two children, Rebecca Fox, a First 5 Los Angeles organizer, and Joshua Fox, a police officer. They have three grandchildren.
