= California's 39th senatorial district =

American legislative district

California's 39th State Senate district
Current senator
Akilah Weber; D–San Diego
- Population (2010) • Voting age • Citizen voting age: 928,044; 764,337; 685,425
- Demographics: 59.22% White; 5.08% Black; 16.88% Latino; 16.60% Asian; 0.65% Native American; 0.46% Hawaiian/Pacific Islander; 0.37% other; 0.75% remainder of multiracial
- Registered voters: 589,426
- Registration: 44.17% Democratic; 23.19% Republican; 26.97% No party preference

California's 39th senatorial district is one of 40 California State Senate districts. It is currently represented by Democrat Akilah Weber of San Diego.

== District profile ==
The district encompasses most of the city of San Diego, along with some of its inner suburbs. It is centered on downtown San Diego and mainly stretches along the city's coastline, including part of San Diego Bay.

San Diego County – 30.0%

- Coronado
- Del Mar
- San Diego – 68.0%
- Solana Beach

== Election results from statewide races ==
Year	Office	Results
2021	Recall	No 66.5 – 33.5%
2020	President	Biden 68.0 – 29.6%
2018	Governor	Newsom 64.6 – 35.4%
2018	Senator	Feinstein 56.5 – 43.5%
2016	President	Clinton 65.3 – 30.1%
2016	Senator	Harris 64.8 – 35.2%
2014	Governor	Brown 58.3 – 41.7%
2012	President	Obama 58.8 – 38.8%
2012	Senator	Feinstein 61.0 – 39.0%
2010	Governor	Brown 54.6 – 39.7%
2010	Senator	Boxer 54.7 – 39.5%
2008	President	Obama 64.8 – 33.4%
2006	Governor	Schwarzenegger 57.0 – 37.9%
2006	Senator	Feinstein 63.8 – 31.5%
2004	President	Kerry 57.6 – 41.3%
2004	Senator	Boxer 61.2 – 34.1%
2003	Recall	No 55.6 – 44.4%
2003	Recall	Schwarzenegger 50.7 – 30.8%
2002	Governor	Davis 49.3 – 42.0%
2000	President	Gore 52.0 – 42.3%
2000	Senator	Feinstein 58.0 – 34.6%
1998	Governor	Davis 54.3 – 40.9%
1998	Senator	Boxer 51.4 – 44.2%
1996	President	Clinton 48.8 – 40.5%
1994	Governor	Wilson 57.9 – 37.8%
1994	Senator	Huffington 46.8 – 45.0%
1992	President	Clinton 42.7 – 31.7%
1992	Senator	Boxer 48.7 – 42.0%
1992	Senator	Feinstein 53.3 – 39.2%

== List of senators representing the district ==
Due to redistricting, the 39th district has been moved around different parts of the state. The current iteration resulted from the 2021 redistricting by the California Citizens Redistricting Commission.

Senators	Party	Years served	Electoral history	Counties represented
L. J. Rose (Los Angeles)	Democratic	January 3, 1887 – January 7, 1889	Elected in 1886. [data missing]	Los Angeles
Joseph E. McComas (Pomona)	Republican	January 7, 1889 – January 2, 1893	Elected in 1888. Retired to run for U.S. House of Representatives.	Los Angeles
Edwin C. Seymour (San Bernardino)	Republican	January 2, 1893 – January 4, 1897	Elected in 1892. [data missing]	Orange, San Bernardino
Thomas J. Jones (Santa Ana)	Republican	January 4, 1897 – January 1, 1901	Elected in 1896. [data missing]	Orange, Riverside, San Bernardino
Albert A. Caldwell (Riverside)	Republican	January 1, 1901 – January 2, 1905	Elected in 1900. [data missing]	Orange, Riverside, San Bernardino
John N. Anderson (Santa Ana)	Republican	January 2, 1905 – January 4, 1909	Elected in 1904. [data missing]	Orange, Riverside
Miguel Estudillo (Riverside)	Republican	January 4, 1909 – January 6, 1913	Elected in 1908. [data missing]	Orange, Riverside
John N. Anderson (Santa Ana)	Republican	January 6, 1913 – January 8, 1917	Elected in 1912. [data missing]	Imperial, Orange, Riverside
Samuel C. Evans Jr. (Riverside)	Republican	January 8, 1917 – January 3, 1921	Elected in 1916. [data missing]	Imperial, Orange, Riverside
Walter Eden (Santa Ana)	Republican	January 3, 1921 – January 7, 1929	Elected in 1920. Re-elected in 1924. [data missing]	Imperial, Orange, Riverside
Nelson T. Edwards (Orange)	Republican	January 7, 1929 – January 2, 1933	Elected in 1928. Redistricted to the 35th district.	Imperial, Orange, Riverside
Ben Hulse (Imperial)	Republican	January 2, 1933 – January 4, 1937	Elected in 1932. Retired.	Imperial
Edward H. Law (El Centro)	Democratic	January 4, 1937 – January 6, 1941	Elected in 1936. [data missing]	Imperial
E. George Luckey (Brawley)	Democratic	January 6, 1941 – January 8, 1945	Elected in 1940. [data missing]	Imperial
Ben Hulse (Imperial)	Republican	January 8, 1945 – January 7, 1957	Elected in 1944. Re-elected in 1948. Re-elected 1952. [data missing]	Imperial
J. William Beard (El Centro)	Democratic	January 7, 1957 – January 2, 1961	Elected in 1956. [data missing]	Imperial
Aaron W. Quick (Calexico)	Democratic	January 2, 1961 – January 2, 1967	Elected in 1960. Re-elected in 1964. [data missing]	Imperial
Jack Schrade (El Cajon)	Republican	January 2, 1967 – November 30, 1976	Redistricted from the 40th district and re-elected in 1966. Re-elected in 1968. Re-elected in 1972. Lost re-election.	San Diego
Bob Wilson (El Cajon)	Democratic	December 6, 1976 – November 30, 1980	Elected in 1976. Retired to run for U.S. House of Representatives.	San Diego
Jim Ellis (San Diego)	Republican	December 1, 1980 – November 30, 1988	Elected in 1980. Re-elected in 1984. [data missing]	San Diego
Lawrence W. Stirling (San Diego)	Republican	December 5, 1988 – September 29, 1989	Elected in 1988. Resigned.	San Diego
Vacant		September 29, 1989 – December 21, 1989		San Diego
Lucy Killea (San Diego)	Democratic	December 21, 1989 – November 30, 1992	Elected to finish Sterling's term. Re-elected in 1992. Term-limited and retired.	San Diego
Lucy Killea (San Diego)	Independent	December 7, 1992 – November 30, 1996	Elected to finish Sterling's term. Re-elected in 1992. Term-limited and retired.	San Diego
Dede Alpert (San Diego)	Democratic	December 2, 1996 – November 30, 2004	Elected in 1996. Re-elected in 2000. Term-limited and retired.	San Diego
Christine Kehoe (San Diego)	Democratic	December 6, 2004 – November 30, 2012	Elected in 2004. Re-elected in 2008. Term-limited and retired.	San Diego
Marty Block (San Diego)	Democratic	December 3, 2012 – November 30, 2016	Elected in 2012. Retired due to term limits.	San Diego
Toni Atkins (San Diego)	Democratic	December 5, 2016 – November 30, 2024	Elected in 2016. Re-elected in 2020. Term-limited and retired.	San Diego
Akilah Weber (La Mesa)	Democratic	December 2, 2024 – present	Elected in 2024.	San Diego

== Election results (1989-present) ==
=== 2024 ===
2024 California State Senate 39th district election
Primary election
Party	Candidate	Votes	%
Democratic	Akilah Weber	121,647	60.7
Republican	Bob Divine	78,637	39.3
Total votes		200,284	100.0
General election
Democratic	Akilah Weber	266,830	63.0
Republican	Bob Divine	156,616	37.0
Total votes		423,446	100.0
Democratic hold			

=== 2020 ===
2020 California State Senate 39th district election
Primary election
Party	Candidate	Votes	%
Democratic	Toni Atkins (incumbent)	212,626	91.9
Republican	Linda Blankenship (write-in)	18,643	8.1
Total votes		231,269	100.0
General election
Democratic	Toni Atkins (incumbent)	336,467	66.2
Republican	Linda Blankenship	171,952	33.8
Total votes		508,419	100.0
Democratic hold			

=== 2016 ===
2016 California State Senate 39th district election
Primary election
Party	Candidate	Votes	%
Democratic	Toni Atkins	159,970	66.3
Republican	John Renison	43,760	18.1
Republican	J. Bribiesca	26,565	11.0
Republican	Richard M. Fago	10,895	4.5
Total votes		241,190	100.0
General election
Democratic	Toni Atkins	258,686	62.5
Republican	John Renison	155,053	37.5
Total votes		413,739	100.0
Democratic hold			

=== 2012 ===
2012 California State Senate 39th district election
Primary election
Party	Candidate	Votes	%
Democratic	Marty Block	85,930	46.3
Republican	George Plescia	81,214	43.7
Democratic	Patrick L. Marsh	18,510	10.0
Total votes		185,654	100.0
General election
Democratic	Marty Block	221,012	58.4
Republican	George Plescia	157,305	41.6
Total votes		378,317	100.0
Democratic hold			

=== 2008 ===
2008 California State Senate 39th district election
Party	Candidate	Votes	%
Democratic	Christine Kehoe (incumbent)	227,475	65.2
Republican	Jeff Perwin	108,606	31.1
Libertarian	Jesse Thomas	12,742	3.7
Total votes		348,823	100.0
Democratic hold			

=== 2004 ===
2004 California State Senate 39th district election
Party	Candidate	Votes	%
Democratic	Christine Kehoe	200,737	60.0
Republican	Larry Stirling	118,417	35.4
Libertarian	John Murphy	15,552	4.6
Total votes		334,706	100.0
Democratic hold			

=== 2000 ===
2000 California State Senate 39th district election
Party	Candidate	Votes	%
Democratic	Dede Alpert (incumbent)	160,834	56.3
Republican	Larry Stirling	112,454	39.4
Libertarian	Roger A. Nichols	6,474	2.3
Natural Law	Stuart Knoles	5,973	2.0
Total votes		285,735	100.0
Democratic hold			

=== 1996 ===
1996 California State Senate 39th district election
Party	Candidate	Votes	%
Democratic	Dede Alpert	142,722	51.7
Republican	Joe Dolphin	126,653	45.9
Natural Law	Stuart Knoles	6,533	2.4
Total votes		275,908	100.0
Democratic gain from Independent			

=== 1992 ===
1992 California State Senate 39th district election
Party	Candidate	Votes	%
Independent	Lucy Killea (incumbent)	187,353	60.4
Republican	Jim Ellis	102,419	33.0
Peace and Freedom	Patricia Cofre	10,844	3.5
Libertarian	John P. Moody	9,553	3.1
Total votes		310,169	100.0
Independent hold			

=== 1989 (special) ===
1989 California State Senate 39th district special election Vacancy resulting from the resignation of Lawrence W. Stirling
Party	Candidate	Votes	%
Democratic	Lucy Killea	62,283	51.0
Republican	Carol Bentley	59,721	48.9
No party	Thomas M. Connolly III (write-in)	107	0.1
Total votes		122,111	100.0
Democratic gain from Republican			

== See also ==
- California State Senate
- California State Senate districts
- Districts in California
