= 1992 California elections =

- November 3, 1992
- Registered: 15,101,473
- Turnout: 75.32% (▲16.71 pp)

Elections were held in California on November 3, 1992. Primary elections were held on March 3. Up for election were all the seats of the State Assembly, 20 seats of the State Senate, and fifteen ballot measures. Both Senate seats, all 52 House seats, and the presidential election were also on the ballot.

== California State Legislature elections ==
=== State Senate ===
There are 40 seats in the State Senate. For this election, candidates running in odd-numbered districts ran for four-year terms.

California State Senate - 1992	Seats
Democratic-Held	25
Republican-Held	14
Independent-Held	1
1992 Elections
Democratic Held and Uncontested	15
Contested	20
Republican Held and Uncontested	5
Total	40

=== State Assembly ===
All 80 biennially elected seats of the State Assembly were up for election this year. Each seat has a two-year term. The Democrats retained control of the State Assembly.

California State Assembly - 1992	Seats
Democratic-Held	48
Republican-Held	32
1992 Elections
Democratic Incumbent and Uncontested	34
Republican Incumbent and Uncontested	17
Contested, Open Seats	29
Total	80

== Statewide ballot propositions ==
Fifteen ballot propositions qualified to be listed on the general election ballot in California. Only five measures passed while ten failed.

=== Proposition 155 ===
- Proposition 155 passed with 51.8% of the vote.
  The 1992 School Facilities Bond Act is a legislatively referred bond act that would authorize US$900,000,000 in bonds for construction or improvement of public schools. Supporters urged passage to upgrade schools to seismic standards; opponents pointed out the already-large state education budget and urged an alternative school voucher program instead.

Proposition 155 results by county Yes: 70–80%; 60–70%; 50–60%; No: 70–80%; 60–70%; 50–60%

=== Proposition 156 ===
- Proposition 156 failed with 48.11% of the vote.
  The Passenger Rail and Clean Air Bond Act of 1992 is a legislatively referred bond act that would authorize US$1,000,000,000 in bonds to fund acquisition of rights-of-way, capital expenditures, and rolling stock for intercity rail, commuter rail, and rail transit programs. Supporters urged passage to relieve crowded freeways; opponents questioned the cost-benefit balance.

Proposition 156 results by county No: 80–90%; 70–80%; 60–70%; 50–60%; Yes: 70–80%; 50–60%

=== Proposition 157 ===
- Proposition 157 failed with 28.16% of the vote.
  The Toll Roads and Highways proposition is a legislatively referred constitutional amendment that would cause state toll roads and highways leased to private entities to become toll-free within 35 years. The provision was permitted to be suspended by a two-thirds vote of the legislature. Supporters urged passage to make toll roads free once they were turned over to state control; opponents were concerned that taxes could be raised to cover up to 35 years of deferred highway maintenance.

Proposition 157 results by county No: 80–90%; 70–80%; 60–70%

=== Proposition 158 ===
- Proposition 158 failed with 39.87% of the vote.
  The Office of California Analyst proposition is a legislatively referred constitutional amendment that would create the Office of California Analyst to replace the present Legislative Analyst, and exempt the cost of the office from Proposition 140 (1990) legislative cost limits. Supporters urged passage to preserve the nonpartisan Analyst's Office, which provides cost estimates for ballot measures; opponents believed it was an end-run around Proposition 140 limits.

Proposition 158 results by county No: 80–90%; 70–80%; 60–70%; 50–60%; Yes: 60–70%; 50–60%

=== Proposition 159 ===
- Proposition 159 failed with 41.04% of the vote.
  The Office of the Auditor General proposition is a legislatively referred constitutional amendment that would establish the Auditor General as a Constitutional office and exempt the cost of the office from Proposition 140 (1990) legislative cost limits. Supporters urged passage to assure the nonpartisan Auditor General's Office would continue conducting audits; opponents also believed Proposition 159, like Proposition 158, was an end-run around Proposition 140 limits.

Proposition 159 results by county No: 80–90%; 70–80%; 60–70%; 50–60%; Yes: 60–70%; 50–60%

=== Proposition 160 ===
- Proposition 160 passed with 51.59% of the vote.
  The Property Tax Exemption is a legislatively referred constitutional amendment that would permit the home of a person (or their spouse) to be exempted from property taxes if that person died while on active military duty from a service-connected injury or disease. Existing law provides a property tax exemption for the home of a 100% disabled veteran or their unmarried surviving spouse, and Proposition 160 would extend that exemption to an unmarried surviving spouse who died in military service. Opponents pointed out that Proposition 160 created more potentially discriminatory situations (the exemption would not be extended to remarried spouses, spouses of veterans who died after leaving military service, or spouses of those who die in the service high-hazard occupations such as police or fire fighting work).

Proposition 160 results by county Yes: 50–60%; No: 60–70%; 50–60%

=== Proposition 161 ===
- Proposition 161 failed with 45.87% of the vote.
  The Physician-Assisted Death. Terminal Condition proposition is a voter-referred statute that would allow mentally competent adults to request a willing physician to assist in dying in the event a terminal condition (resulting in death within six months) is diagnosed by two physicians. Medical professionals willing to assist in dying would not be held civilly, criminally, professionally, or administratively liable for providing their assistance in accordance with the measure's provisions. Medical professionals and privately owned hospitals were not required to provide assistance if they were religiously, morally, or ethically opposed. Health and life insurance policies were not allowed to be affected by a request for assisted death. A death resulting from physician assistance would not be legally defined as suicide. Supporters stated this measure was completely voluntary and had safeguards against potential abuse (with a witnessed, revocable directive); opponents did not believe the safeguards in place were sufficiently strong (no witnesses, no family notification, no waiting period, no counseling, and no residency requirements).

Proposition 161 results by county No: 60–70%; 50–60%; Yes: 60–70%; 50–60%; Tie: 50%

=== Proposition 162 ===
- Proposition 162 passed with 51% of the vote.
  The Public Employees' Retirement Systems proposition is a voter-referred constitutional amendment that would grant sole authority over investments and administration to the boards of public employee retirement systems. Further, membership in the boards would preferentially consist of participants and beneficiaries in the pensions, and changes in board membership would be restricted. Supporters believed this would stop pension funds from being used by disinterested politicians; opponents questioned why independent reviews from outside experts would no longer be allowed.

Proposition 162 results by county Yes: 60–70%; 50–60%; No: 60–70%; 50–60%

=== Proposition 163 ===
- Proposition 163 passed with 66.62% of the vote.
  The Ends Taxation of Certain Food Products proposition is a voter-referred constitutional amendment and statute that would prohibit sales or use taxes on candy, bottled water, and snack foods. No opposing argument was filed.

Proposition 163 results by county Yes: 70–80%; 60–70%; 50–60%

=== Proposition 164 ===
- Proposition 164 passed with 63.57% of the vote.
  The Congressional Term Limits proposition is a voter-referred statute that would deny ballot access in races for US Congress seats to persons who have already held that office for a specified period of time, but provides exemptions for those already elected and did not restrict voters from casting "write-in" votes for their preferred candidate. Supporters urged passage to end career politicians; opponents feared the lack of experience in Congress would hurt California's political clout.

Proposition 164 results by county Yes: 70–80%; 60–70%; 50–60%; No: 50–60%

=== Proposition 165 ===
- Proposition 165 failed with 46.61% of the vote.
  The Budget Process. Welfare. Procedural and Substantive Changes proposition is a voter-referred constitutional amendment and statute that would grant the Governor constitutional power to reduce expenditures in order to balance the budget during 'fiscal emergencies' and would limit welfare expenditures. Supporters touted the welfare reform aspects; opponents pointed out that unprecedented executive power would be granted to cut other programs, such as education, environmental protection, and health care.

Proposition 165 results by county No: 70–80%; 60–70%; 50–60%; Yes: 50–60%

=== Proposition 166 ===
- Proposition 166 failed with 30.81% of the vote.
  The Basic Health Care Coverage proposition is a voter-referred statute that would require employers to provide health care coverage for employees and dependents. It would limit employee contributions, specify benefits, and provide employer tax credits. Supporters urged passage to simplify insurance options and provide more universal coverage; opponents believed costs could not be controlled and employers would cut hours, wages, and benefits in response.

Proposition 166 results by county No: 80–90%; 70–80%; 60–70%; 50–60%

=== Proposition 167 ===
- Proposition 167 failed with 41.16% of the vote.
  The State Taxes proposition is a voter-referred statute that would increase taxes on taxpayers in top personal income brackets, corporations, banks, insurance companies, and oil producers. Supporters stated the increased tax revenue would be offset by reduced sales and rental taxes; opponents believed it would hurt businesses and drive jobs out of California.

Proposition 167 results by county No: 70–80%; 60–70%; 50–60%; Yes: 50–60%

== See also ==
- California State Legislature
- California State Assembly
- California State Assembly elections, 1992
- California State Senate
- California State Senate elections, 1992
- Districts in California
- Political party strength in U.S. states
- Political party strength in California
- Elections in California
