= Charles R. Imbrecht =

American politician from southern California

Charles R. "Chuck" Imbrecht

Member of the California State Assembly from the 36th district
- In office December 6, 1976 - November 30, 1982
- Preceded by: John Kenyon MacDonald
- Succeeded by: Tom McClintock

Personal details
- Born: February 4, 1949 Ventura, California
- Died: January 19, 2000 (aged 50) Pasadena, California
- Cause of death: Heart attack
- Resting place: Ivy Lawn Cemetery; Ventura, California
- Party: Republican
- Spouse: Alida Bergseid Imbrecht
- Children: 2
- Education: Ventura High School, 1967; Occidental College; Loyola University, law degree

Charles Richard "Chuck" Imbrecht (February 4, 1949 – January 19, 2000) was an American politician from Southern California.

Imbrecht was born in 1949. He was an attorney by profession who took an interest in public policy. In 1978, he was elected to the California State Assembly representing the 36th Assembly district. He was one of the more moderate Republicans in that chamber, and he was both well regarded by his colleagues and popular with his constituents. He was reelected to a second term in 1980, but in 1982, he sought election to the California State Senate. After a hard-fought and expensive campaign, he was narrowly defeated by Democratic state Assemblyman Gary K. Hart.

He was later appointed Chairman of the state Energy Commission, but resigned amid troubles with alcoholism. In 1997, he pled guilty to drunk driving charges for the third time. His indictments for excessive blood alcohol and marijuana were dropped. He was sentenced to 40 days in the county jail.(1997) Upon release he recovered and resumed a successful law practice.

On January 19, 2000, he died of a heart attack at his apartment in Pasadena, California. He is interred at Ivy Lawn Cemetery in Ventura, California.
