= Lucy Killea =

American politician (1922–2017)

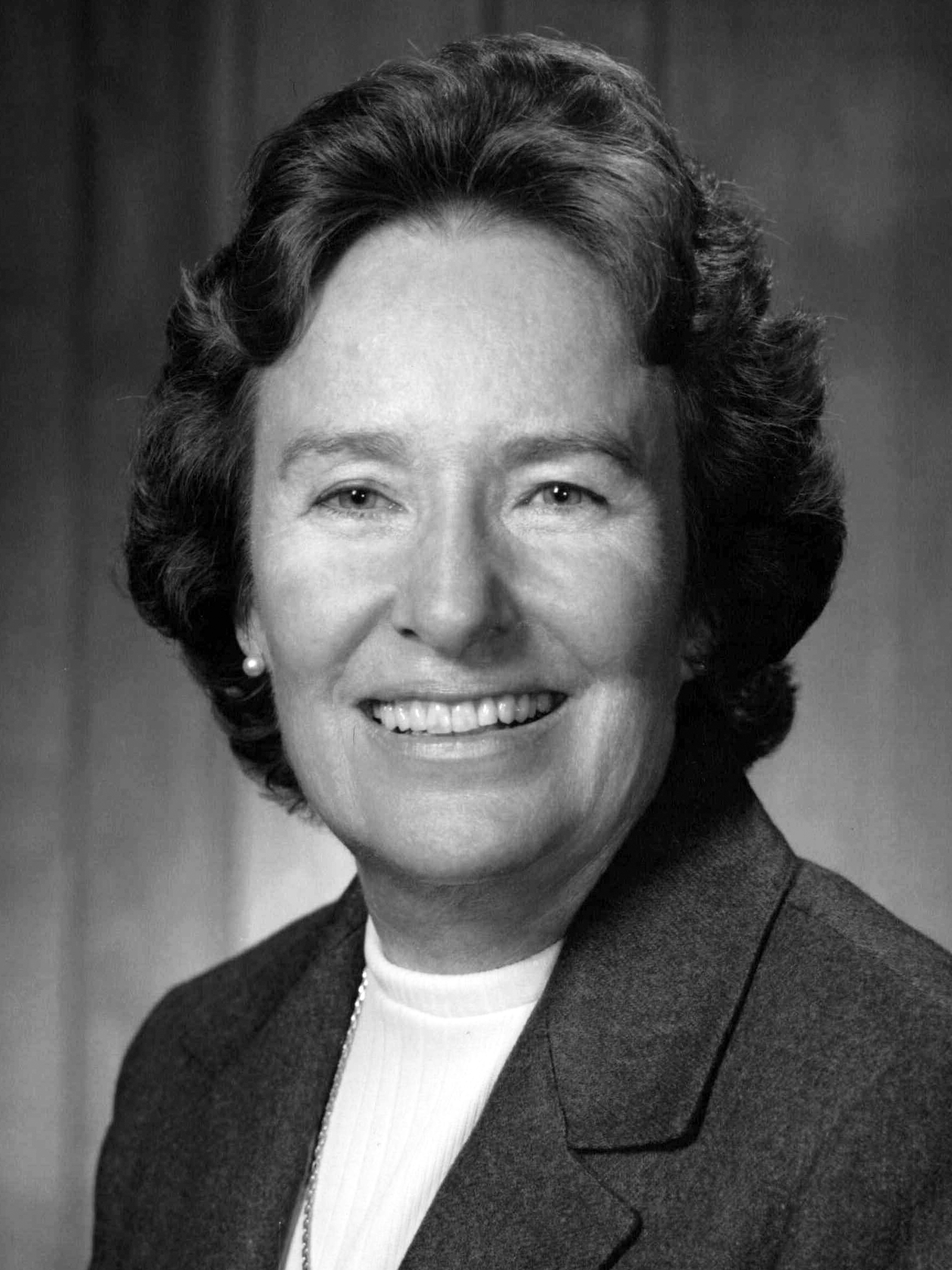
- Official portrait, 1978

Member of the California Senate from the 39th district
- In office December 21, 1989 – November 30, 1996
- Preceded by: Lawrence W. Stirling
- Succeeded by: Dede Alpert

Member of the California State Assembly from the 78th district
- In office December 6, 1982 – December 21, 1989
- Preceded by: Lawrence Kapiloff
- Succeeded by: Jeff Marston

Personal details
- Born: Lucy Gold Lytle; July 31, 1922 San Antonio, Texas, U.S.
- Died: January 18, 2017 (aged 94) San Diego, California, U.S.
- Party: Independent; Democratic (before 1991)
- Spouse: John F. Killea (m. 1946; died 1997)
- Children: 2
- Education: Incarnate Word College; University of San Diego
- Occupation: politician

Lucy Killea (born Lucy Gold Lytle; July 31, 1922 – January 18, 2017) was an American politician who served in the California State Legislature, from 1982 to 1996.

== Biography ==
Lytle was born in San Antonio, Texas, and received a bachelor's degree from Incarnate Word College there in 1943. She served as a research analyst in Western Europe for the Military Intelligence Corps (United States Army), then in various other capacities for the United States Department of State, Central Intelligence Agency, Economic Cooperation Administration, United States Information Agency, in several countries. She married John F. Killea in 1946, and left the CIA in 1958 when her first child was born and when her husband was named consul general in Monterrey, Mexico, by President Eisenhower. John was subsequently named consul general in Tijuana, and Lucy remained interested in U. S.-Mexico relations, helping to found, in San Diego, Fronteras de las Californias and the International Community Foundation, "both of which sought to help people south of the border through grants and charitable giving." She died on January 18, 2017, in San Diego, at the age of 94.

== Education ==
In addition to her undergraduate studies, Lucy Killea received a Master of Arts degree in history from the University of San Diego in 1966, and a doctorate in history from the University of California, San Diego, in 1975.

== Elections and controversy ==
Killea was elected to the San Diego City Council from 1978 to 1982, then to the California State Assembly from its 78th district from 1982 to 1989.

She was elected in a special election in 1989, replacing Larry Stirling as the senator for California's 39th State Senate district. Controversy surrounded the election as Leo Thomas Maher, the Catholic bishop of San Diego, prohibited Killea from receiving communion because she was pro-choice; she was the first politician to be punished in such a way for her political views. The incident brought publicity to her candidacy and gained her the voters' sympathy, winning her the election. Killea was subsequently re-elected in 1992, after leaving the Democratic Party in 1991 to become Independent. Due to term limits, she was unable to run for reelection in 1996, and retired.

== Honors ==
Lucy Killea was nominated and inducted into the San Diego County Women's Hall of Fame in 2002 hosted by Women's Museum of California, Commission on the Status of Women, University of California, San Diego, Women's Center, and San Diego State University Women's Studies. She was a senior fellow of the International Community Foundation, and served on the Board of Advisors of the San Diego–based Center for Ethics in Science and Technology.
