= Aaron W. Quick =

American politician

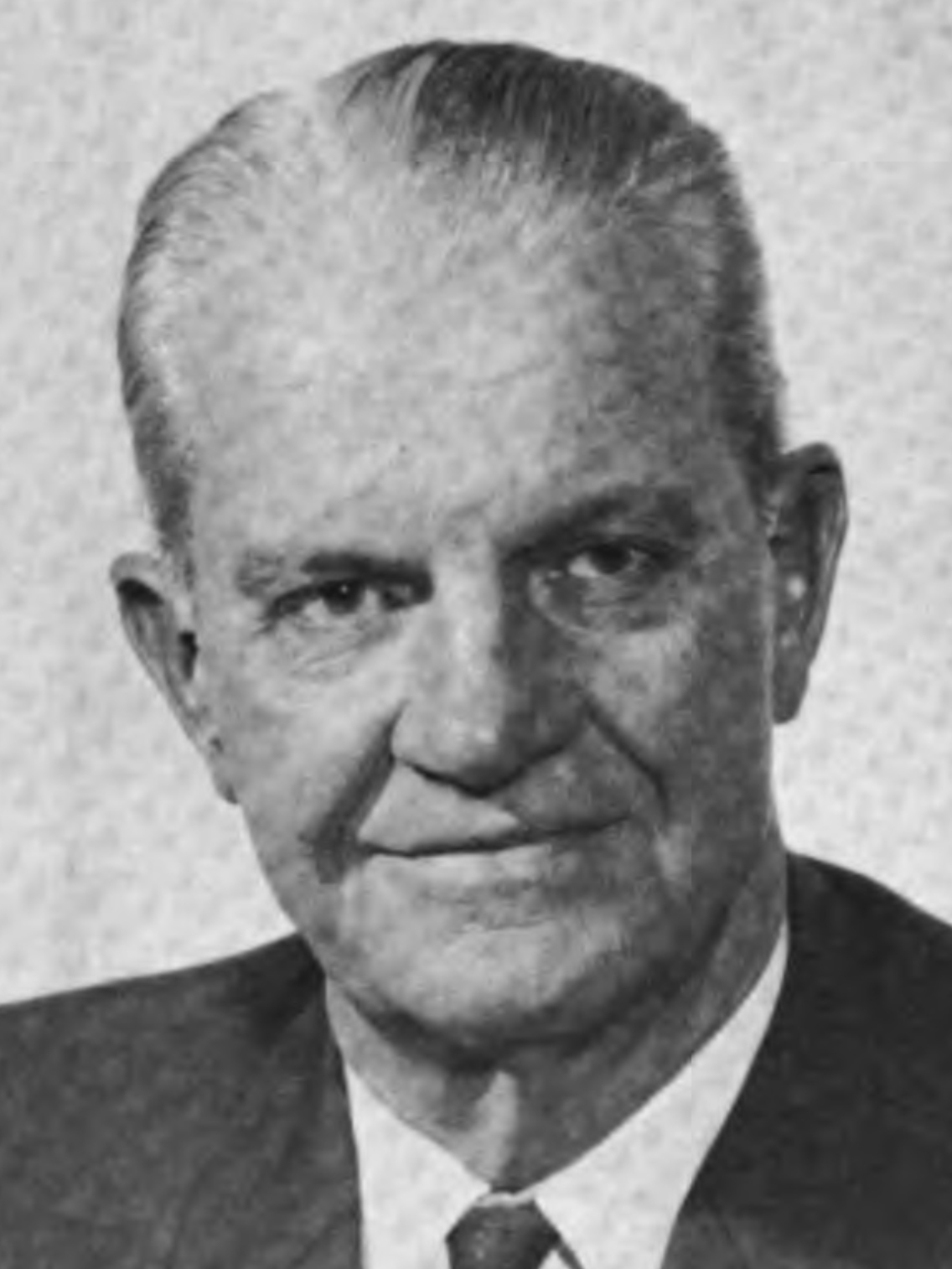
- Quick in 1963

Member of the California State Senate from the 39th district
- In office January 2, 1961 – January 2, 1967
- Preceded by: John William Beard
- Succeeded by: Jack Schrade

Personal details
- Born: July 8, 1901 Kansas, U.S.
- Died: September 20, 1971 (aged 70)
- Party: Democratic

Aaron W. Quick (July 8, 1901 – September 20, 1971) was an American politician. He served as a Democratic member for the 39th district of the California State Senate.

== Life and career ==
Quick was born in Kansas. He was a customs agent.

In 1960, Quick was elected to represent the 39th district of the California State Senate, succeeding John William Beard. He served until 1967, when he was succeeded by Jack Schrade.

Quick died on September 20, 1971, at the age of 70.
