= 1992 California State Senate election =

- November 3, 1992

20 seats from odd-numbered districts in the California State Senate 21 seats needed for a majority
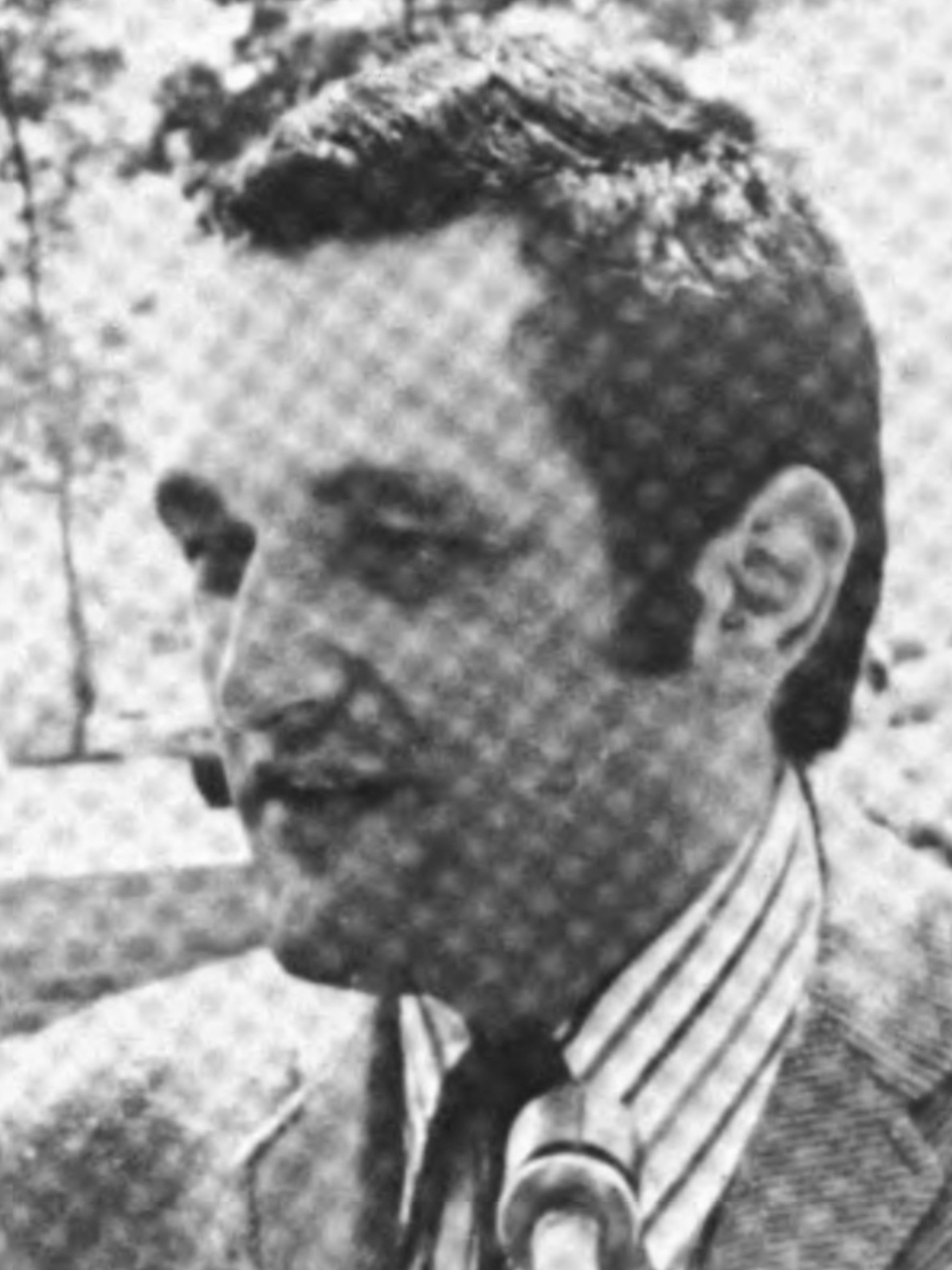

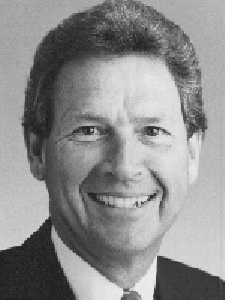
	Majority party	Minority party
Leader	David Roberti	Kenneth L. Maddy
Party	Democratic	Republican
Leader's seat	20th–Los Angeles	14th–Fresno
Seats before	25	14
Seats after	23	15
Seat change	▼2	▲1
Popular vote	2,582,789	2,528,842
Percentage	45.42%	44.47%
- Results: Republican gain Democratic hold Republican hold Independent Gain; No election held
President pro tempore before election
David Roberti
Democratic
President pro tempore-designate
David Roberti
Democratic

The 1992 California State Senate elections were held on November 3, 1992. Senate seats of odd-numbered districts were up for election. Senate terms are staggered so that half the membership is elected every two years. Senators serve four-year terms and are limited to two terms. The Democratic Party held on to the majority of the seats, though they lost two, one to a Republican and one when Lucy Killea switched from Democratic to Independent.

== Overview ==
California State Senate elections, 1992
Party	Votes	Percentage	Not up	Incumbents	Open	Before	After	+/–
Democratic	2,582,789	45.42%	17	5	3	25	23	-2
Republican	2,528,842	44.47%	2	9	3	14	15	+1
Libertarian	191,407	3.37%	0	0	0	0	0	0
Independent	187,353	3.29%	1	1	0	1	2	+1
Peace and Freedom	163,114	2.87%	0	0	0	0	0	0
Green	32,717	0.58%	0	0	0	0	0	0
Write-ins	168	0.00%	0	0	0	0	0	0
Invalid or blank votes	639,713	10.11%	—	—	—	—	—	—
Totals	6,326,103	100.00%	20	14	6	40	40	—

== Results ==
Final results from the California Secretary of State:

=== District 1 ===
California's 1st State Senate district election, 1992
Party	Candidate	Votes	%
Republican	Tim Leslie (incumbent)	189,095	54.75
Democratic	Thomas A. Romero	123,563	35.78
Green	Kent Smith	32,717	9.47
Invalid or blank votes		29,589	7.89
Total votes		372,954	100.00
Republican hold			

=== District 3 ===
California's 3rd State Senate district election, 1992
Party	Candidate	Votes	%
Democratic	Milton Marks (incumbent)	225,869	66.44
Republican	Bill Boerum	85,323	25.10
Libertarian	Will C. Wohler	16,590	4.88
Peace and Freedom	Giovanni Graham	12,163	3.58
Invalid or blank votes		41,370	51.2
Total votes		381,315	100.00
Democratic hold			

=== District 5 ===
California's 5th State Senate district election, 1992
Party	Candidate	Votes	%
Democratic	Patrick Johnston (incumbent)	162,122	57.46
Republican	Ron Stauffer	105,333	37.33
Libertarian	Eric Roberts	14,713	5.21
Invalid or blank votes		23,682	7.74
Total votes		305,850	100.00
Democratic hold			

=== District 7 ===
California's 7th State Senate district election, 1992
Party	Candidate	Votes	%
Democratic	Daniel E. Boatwright (incumbent)	195,777	58.01
Republican	Gilbert Marguth	141,709	41.99
Invalid or blank votes		38,055	10.13
Total votes		375,541	100.00
Democratic hold			

=== District 9 ===
California's 9th State Senate district election, 1992
Party	Candidate	Votes	%
Democratic	Nicholas C. Petris	228,283	84.60
Peace and Freedom	David Campbell	41,555	15.40
Invalid or blank votes			
Total votes			100.00
Democratic hold			

=== District 11 ===
California's 11th State Senate district election, 1992
Party	Candidate	Votes	%
Republican	Becky Morgan (incumbent)	218,855	64.50
Democratic	Frank W. Trinkle	104,162	30.70
Libertarian	Christopher R. Inama	16,900	4.80
Invalid or blank votes		34,099	9.13
Total votes		374,016	100.00
Republican hold			

=== District 13 ===
California's 13th State Senate district election, 1992
Party	Candidate	Votes	%
Democratic	Al Alquist (incumbent)	140,081	60.46
Republican	Michael Iddings	72,340	31.22
Libertarian	John Harvey Webster	19,258	8.31
Invalid or blank votes		24,605	9.60
Total votes		256,284	100.00
Democratic hold			

=== District 15 ===
California's 15th State Senate district election, 1992
Party	Candidate	Votes	%
Democratic	Henry J. Mello (incumbent)	162,771	58.40
Republican	Edward Laverone	95,412	34.13
Peace and Freedom	Susanne Espinoza	20,818	7.47
Invalid or blank votes		16,888	5.71
Total votes		295,889	100.00
Democratic hold			

=== District 17 ===
California's 17th State Senate district election, 1992
Party	Candidate	Votes	%
Republican	Don Rogers (incumbent)	136,298	52.15
Democratic	William M. Olenick	101,715	38.92
Libertarian	Fred Heiser	23,340	8.93
Invalid or blank votes		27,834	9.62
Total votes		289,187	100.00
Republican gain from Democratic			

=== District 19 ===
California's 19th State Senate district election, 1992
Party	Candidate	Votes	%
Republican	Cathie Wright	148,116	53.24
Democratic	Hank Starr	108,052	38.84
Libertarian	Richard N. Burns	11,483	4.13
Peace and Freedom	Charles Najbergier	10,569	3.80
Invalid or blank votes		26,896	8.82
Total votes		305,116	100.00
Republican hold			

=== District 21 ===
California's 21st State Senate district election, 1992
Party	Candidate	Votes	%
Republican	Newton R. Russell (incumbent)	133,385	50.04
Democratic	Rachel J. Dewey	116,486	43.70
Libertarian	James R. "Bob" New	10,658	4.00
Peace and Freedom	Jan B. Tucker	6,031	2.26
No party	Lewis Weiss (write-in)	3	0.00
Invalid or blank votes		25,122	8.61
Total votes		266,563	100.00
Republican hold			

=== District 23 ===
California's 23rd State Senate district election, 1992
Party	Candidate	Votes	%
Democratic	Tom Hayden	198,425	55.89
Republican	Leonard H. "Len" McRoskey	117,455	33.08
Peace and Freedom	Shirley Rachel Isaacson	27,976	7.88
Libertarian	R. William Weilburg	11,160	3.14
No party	Joseph Alexander Cota (write-in)	8	0.00
Invalid or blank votes		37,297	9.51
Total votes		355,024	100.00
Democratic hold			

=== District 25 ===
California's 25th State Senate district election, 1992
Party	Candidate	Votes	%
Democratic	Teresa Hughes	125,316	76.75
Republican	Cliff McClain	30,666	18.78
Peace and Freedom	Hattie Marie Benn	7,289	4.46
Invalid or blank votes		20,456	11.13
Total votes		183,727	100.00
Democratic gain from Republican			

=== District 27 ===
California's 27th State Senate district election, 1992
Party	Candidate	Votes	%
Republican	Robert G. Beverly (incumbent)	129,010	47.29
Democratic	Brian Finander	123,956	45.44
Libertarian	David J. Rosen	10,828	3.97
Peace and Freedom	Patrick McCoy	8,999	3.30
Invalid or blank votes		29,687	9.81
Total votes		302,480	100.00
Republican gain from Democratic			

=== District 29 ===
California's 29th State Senate district election, 1992
Party	Candidate	Votes	%
Republican	Frank Hill (incumbent)	148,754	56.18
Democratic	Sandy Hester	116,021	43.82
Invalid or blank votes		25,685	8.84
Total votes		290,460	100.00
Republican hold			

=== District 31 ===
California's 31st State Senate district election, 1992
Party	Candidate	Votes	%
Republican	Bill Leonard (incumbent)	192,171	99.92
No party	Gary R. Biggs (write-in)	119	0.06
No party	Jeffrey A. Schmidt (write-in)	38	0.02
Invalid or blank votes		105,447	35.41
Total votes		297,775	100.00
Republican hold			

=== District 33 ===
California's 33rd State Senate district election, 1992
Party	Candidate	Votes	%
Republican	John Lewis (incumbent)	191,974	64.12
Democratic	Samuel D. Eidt	86,859	29.01
Libertarian	Doyle Guhy	20,543	6.86
Invalid or blank votes		36,454	10.85
Total votes		335,830	100.00
Republican gain from Democratic			

=== District 35 ===
California's 35th State Senate district election, 1992
Party	Candidate	Votes	%
Republican	Marian Bergeson (incumbent)	204,504	62.24
Democratic	Dorianne Garcia	107,512	32.72
Libertarian	Eric Sprik	16,536	5.03
Invalid or blank votes		38,755	10.55
Total votes		367,307	100.00
Republican hold			

=== District 37 ===
California's 37th State Senate district election, 1992
Party	Candidate	Votes	%
Republican	David G. Kelley	141,970	52.47
Democratic	Jim Rickard	101,872	37.65
Peace and Freedom	Renate M. Kline	16,870	6.24
Libertarian	Craig McElvany	9,845	3.64
Invalid or blank votes		29,858	9.94
Total votes		300,415	100.00
Republican hold			

=== District 39 ===
California's 39th State Senate district election, 1992
Party	Candidate	Votes	%
Independent	Lucy Killea (incumbent)	187,353	60.40
Republican	Jim Ellis	102,419	33.02
Peace and Freedom	Patricia Cofre	10,844	3.50
Libertarian	John P. Moody	9,553	3.08
Invalid or blank votes		27,934	8.26
Total votes		338,103	100.00
Independent hold			

== See also ==
- California State Assembly
- California State Assembly elections, 1992
- California state elections, 1992
- California State Legislature
- California State Senate Districts
- Districts in California
- Political party strength in U.S. states
- Political party strength in California
