= John William Beard =

American politician

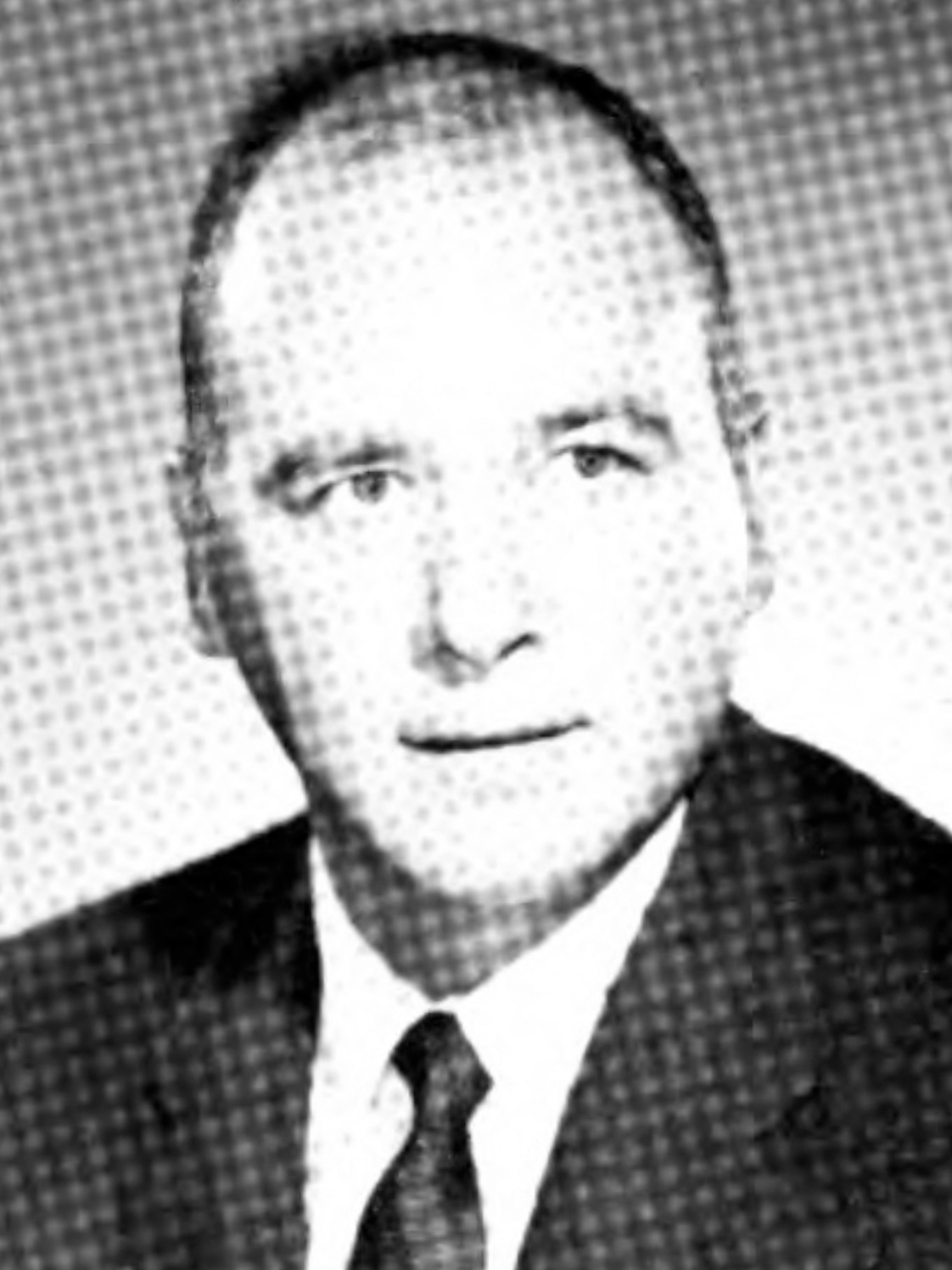

Member of the California Senate from the 39th district
- In office January 7, 1957 – January 2, 1961
- Preceded by: Ben Hulse
- Succeeded by: Aaron W. Quick

Personal details
- Born: March 15, 1920 Chicago, Illinois, U.S.
- Died: February 7, 2006 (aged 85) San Diego, California, U.S.
- Party: Democratic
- Spouse: Ann Dodgen (m. 1945; died 2003)
- Children: 4
- Education: University of Redlands; Southwestern University School of Law

Military service
- Allegiance: United States
- Branch/service: United States Army
- Rank: Lieutenant
- Battles/wars: World War II

John William Beard (March 15, 1920 – February 7, 2006) was a judge and served in the California legislature.

== Personal ==
Beard was born in Chicago, Illinois on March 15, 1920. His family moved to California about 1922. He attended University of Redlands before enlisting in the army and went to law school at Southwestern University School of Law upon completion of his military service. He married Ann Dodgen in October 1945. He died February 7, 2006, in La Vida Real, a retirement community in Rancho San Diego, California.

== Career ==
Beard was a pilot in the United States Army Air Forces in the European theatre of World War II. After completing law school, he practiced law for two years at Lane and McGinnis in Los Angeles, California. He then served at the district attorney's office in Imperial County, California from 1952 to 1955. He served in the California State Senate from 1957 to 1961. He was the chairman, California Industrial Accident Commission 1960–1965. He was a judge for the El Cajon Municipal Court 1980 until he retired about 1990.
