= California's 36th State Assembly district =

American legislative district

Current assemblymember
Jeff Gonzalez; R–Indio
- Population (2020) • Voting age • Citizen voting age: 469,902; 344,493; 277,918
- Demographics: 21.40% White; 2.67% Black; 69.90% Latino; 2.65% Asian; 0.84% Native American; 0.13% Hawaiian/Pacific Islander; 0.38% other; 2.04% remainder of multiracial
- Registered voters: 250,572
- Registration: 41.26% Democratic; 28.95% Republican; 22.61% No party preference

California's 36th State Assembly district is one of 80 California State Assembly districts. It is currently represented by Republican Jeff Gonzalez of Indio.

== District profile ==
The district contains the wide swath between the Dead Mountains to the north and the Mexico-United States border to the south and the Santa Rosa Mountains to the west, including Imperial County and the Hispanic-majority regions of the Coachella Valley.

Imperial County – 100%

- Brawley
- Calexico
- Calipatria
- El Centro
- Holtville
- Imperial
- Westmorland

Riverside County – 11.97%

- Blythe
- Coachella
- Hemet (51.32%)
- Indio

San Bernardino County – 0.32%

- Big River
- Bluewater
- Needles

== Election results from statewide races ==
Year	Office	Results
2021	Recall	No 50.9 – 49.1%
2020	President	Biden 53.6 – 43.8%
2018	Governor	Newsom 51.2 – 48.8%
2018	Senator	de León 52.7 – 47.3%
2016	President	Clinton 49.9 – 43.9%
2016	Senator	Harris 57.5 – 42.5%
2014	Governor	Kashkari 57.9 – 42.2%
2012	President	Obama 48.8 – 48.5%
2012	Senator	Feinstein 50.1 – 49.9%

== List of assembly members representing the district ==
Due to redistricting, the 36th district has been moved around different parts of the state. The current iteration resulted from the 2021 redistricting by the California Citizens Redistricting Commission.

Assembly members	Party	Years served	Counties represented	Notes
John Lafferty	Republican	January 5, 1885 – February 24, 1886	San Francisco	Died in office.
Vacant		February 24, 1886 – January 3, 1887	San Francisco	
Charles F. Curry	Republican	January 3, 1887 – January 7, 1889	San Francisco	
Charles H. Kiernan	Democratic	January 7, 1889 – July 16, 1889	San Francisco	Died in office from hemorrhage in the lungs.
Vacant		July 16, 1889 – January 5, 1891	San Francisco	
John P. Glynn	Republican	January 5, 1891 – January 2, 1893	San Francisco	
John Brownlie	Democratic	January 2, 1893 – January 7, 1895	San Francisco	
John McCarthy	Democratic	January 7, 1895 – January 4, 1897	San Francisco	
Henry McGrath	Fusion	January 4, 1897 – January 2, 1899	San Francisco	
Albert H. Merrill	Republican	January 2, 1899 – January 1, 1901	San Francisco	
William J. Guilfoyle	Republican	January 1, 1901 – January 5, 1903	San Francisco	
Augustus M. Mahany	Democratic	January 5, 1903 – January 2, 1905	San Francisco	
Eugene E. Pfaeffle	Republican	January 2, 1905 – January 7, 1907	San Francisco	
John Wessling	Independence League	January 7, 1907 – January 4, 1909	San Francisco	
Henry Nixon Beatty	Republican	January 4, 1909 – January 6, 1913	San Francisco	
Frank M. Smith	Republican	January 6, 1913 – January 4, 1915	Alameda	
Harry A. Encell	Progressive	January 4, 1915 – January 8, 1917	Alameda	
Frank M. Smith	Republican	January 8, 1917 – January 6, 1919	Alameda	
Leon E. Gray	Republican	January 6, 1919 – May 17, 1919	Alameda	Resigns from office to become Deputy City Attorney of Oakland.
Vacant		May 17, 1919 – January 3, 1921	Alameda	
Gilbert L. Jones	Republican	January 3, 1921 – January 8, 1923	Alameda	
Edward J. Smith	Republican	January 8, 1923 – January 7, 1929	Alameda	
William W. Hoffman	Republican	January 7, 1929 – January 2, 1933	Alameda	
Lucius Powers Jr.	Republican	January 2, 1933 – January 7, 1935	Fresno	
Claud Minard	Republican	January 7, 1935 – January 4, 1937	Fresno	
Hugh M. Burns	Democratic	January 4, 1937 – January 4, 1943	Fresno	
Charles Lester Guthrie	Democratic	January 4, 1943 – January 27, 1946	Kings, Tulare	Died in office from a heart attack.
Vacant		January 27, 1946 – January 6, 1947	Kings, Tulare	
Harry J. Johnson	Democratic	January 6, 1947 – January 3, 1949	Kings, Tulare	
Harlan Hagen	Democratic	January 3, 1949 – January 3, 1953	Kings, Tulare	
Stanley T. Tomlinson	Republican	January 5, 1953 – January 3, 1955	San Luis Obispo, Santa Barbara	
James L. Holmes	Republican	January 3, 1955 – January 4, 1965	San Luis Obispo, Santa Barbara	
Winfield A. Shoemaker	Democratic	January 4, 1965 – January 6, 1969	San Luis Obispo, Santa Barbara	
W. Don MacGillivray	Republican	January 6, 1969 – November 30, 1974	San Luis Obispo, Santa Barbara	
John Kenyon MacDonald	Democratic	December 2, 1974 – November 30, 1976	Ventura	
Charles R. Imbrecht	Republican	December 6, 1976 – November 30, 1982	Ventura	
Tom McClintock	Republican	December 6, 1982 – November 30, 1992	Ventura	
William J. Knight	Republican	December 7, 1992 – November 30, 1996	Los Angeles	
George Runner	Republican	December 2, 1996 – November 30, 2002	Los Angeles	
Sharon Runner	Republican	December 2, 2002 – November 30, 2008	Los Angeles, San Bernardino	
Steve Knight	Republican	December 1, 2008 – November 30, 2012	Los Angeles, San Bernardino	
Steve Fox	Democratic	December 3, 2012 – November 30, 2014	Kern, Los Angeles, San Bernardino	
Tom Lackey	Republican	December 1, 2014 – November 30, 2022	Kern, Los Angeles, San Bernardino	
Eduardo Garcia	Democratic	December 5, 2022 – November 30, 2024	Imperial, Riverside, San Bernardino	
Jeff Gonzalez	Republican	December 5, 2024 – present	Imperial, Riverside, San Bernardino	

== Election results (1990–present) ==
=== 2024 ===
2024 California State Assembly 36th district election
Primary election
Party	Candidate	Votes	%
Republican	Jeff Gonzalez	21,626	35.1
Democratic	Joey Acuña	12,262	19.9
Democratic	Edgard Garcia	7,889	12.8
Republican	Kalin Morse	6,985	11.3
Democratic	Waymond Fermon	4,838	7.8
Democratic	Tomas Oliva	4,624	7.5
Democratic	Eric L. Rodriguez	3,458	5.6
Total votes		61,682	100.0
General election
Republican	Jeff Gonzalez	79,477	51.8
Democratic	Joey Acuña	73,926	48.2
Total votes		153,403	100.0
Republican gain from Democratic			

=== 2022 ===
2022 California State Assembly 36th district election
Primary election
Party	Candidate	Votes	%
Democratic	Eduardo Garcia	27,970	48.0
Republican	Ian Weeks	25,584	43.9
Democratic	Marlon Ware	4,728	8.1
Total votes		58,282	100.0
General election
Democratic	Eduardo Garcia	50,482	53.4
Republican	Ian Weeks	44,055	46.6
Total votes		94,537	100.0
Democratic gain from Republican			

=== 2020 ===
2020 California State Assembly 36th district election
Primary election
Party	Candidate	Votes	%
Republican	Tom Lackey (incumbent)	45,255	53.0
Democratic	Steve Fox	14,771	17.3
Democratic	Johnathon Ervin	6,615	7.8
Democratic	Diedra M. Greenaway	5,084	6.0
Democratic	Michael P. Rives	4,055	4.7
Democratic	Ollie M. McCaulley	3,729	4.4
Democratic	Lourdes Everett	3,405	4.0
Democratic	Eric Andrew Ohlsen	2,440	2.9
Total votes		85,354	100.0
General election
Republican	Tom Lackey (incumbent)	102,442	55.2
Democratic	Steve Fox	83,240	44.8
Total votes		185,682	100.0
Republican hold			

=== 2018 ===
2018 California State Assembly 36th district election
Primary election
Party	Candidate	Votes	%
Republican	Tom Lackey (incumbent)	35,628	60.3
Democratic	Steve Fox	23,447	39.7
Total votes		59,075	100.0
General election
Republican	Tom Lackey (incumbent)	66,584	52.1
Democratic	Steve Fox	61,310	47.9
Total votes		127,894	100.0
Republican hold			

=== 2016 ===
2016 California State Assembly 36th district election
Primary election
Party	Candidate	Votes	%
Republican	Tom Lackey (incumbent)	35,019	48.2
Democratic	Steve Fox	21,541	29.6
Democratic	Darren W. Parker	11,236	15.5
Democratic	Ollie M. McCaulley	4,891	6.7
Total votes		72,687	100.0
General election
Republican	Tom Lackey (incumbent)	77,801	53.1
Democratic	Steve Fox	68,755	46.9
Total votes		146,556	100.0
Republican hold			

=== 2014 ===
2014 California State Assembly 36th district election
Primary election
Party	Candidate	Votes	%
Republican	Tom Lackey	15,095	41.1
Democratic	Steve Fox (incumbent)	12,055	32.8
Republican	JD Kennedy	4,460	12.2
Republican	Suzette M. Martinez	3,390	9.2
Democratic	Kermit F. Franklin	1,706	4.6
Total votes		36,706	100.0
General election
Republican	Tom Lackey	42,107	60.2
Democratic	Steve Fox (incumbent)	27,866	39.8
Total votes		69,973	100.0
Republican gain from Democratic			

=== 2012 ===
2012 California State Assembly 36th district election
Primary election
Party	Candidate	Votes	%
Republican	Ron Smith	15,097	35.1
Democratic	Steve Fox	14,160	32.9
Republican	Tom Lackey	13,795	32.0
Total votes		43,052	100.0
General election
Democratic	Steve Fox	66,005	50.1
Republican	Ron Smith	65,860	49.9
Total votes		131,865	100.0
Democratic gain from Republican			

=== 2010 ===
2010 California State Assembly 36th district election
Party	Candidate	Votes	%
Republican	Steve Knight (incumbent)	66,312	57.6
Democratic	Linda K. Jones	48,943	42.4
Total votes		115,255	100.0
Republican hold			

=== 2008 ===
2008 California State Assembly 36th district election
Party	Candidate	Votes	%
Republican	Steve Knight	79,502	51.5
Democratic	Linda K. Jones	74,841	48.5
Total votes		154,343	100.0
Republican hold			

=== 2006 ===
2006 California State Assembly 36th district election
Party	Candidate	Votes	%
Republican	Sharon Runner (incumbent)	55,712	61.6
Democratic	Robert "Bo" Bynum	34,863	38.4
Total votes		90,575	100.0
Republican hold			

=== 2004 ===
2004 California State Assembly 36th district election
Party	Candidate	Votes	%
Republican	Sharon Runner (incumbent)	89,365	66.3
Democratic	Hotron Scioneaux	45,595	33.7
Total votes		134,960	100.0
Republican hold			

=== 2002 ===
2002 California State Assembly 36th district election
Party	Candidate	Votes	%
Republican	Sharon Runner	46,438	64.0
Democratic	Robert Davenport	26,230	36.0
Total votes		72,668	100.0
Republican hold			

=== 2000 ===
2000 California State Assembly 36th district election
Party	Candidate	Votes	%
Republican	George Runner (incumbent)	90,712	63.1
Democratic	Paula L. Calderon	47,528	33.1
Libertarian	Gregory James Bashem	5,581	3.9
Total votes		143,821	100.0
Republican hold			

=== 1998 ===
1998 California State Assembly 36th district election
Party	Candidate	Votes	%
Republican	George Runner (incumbent)	64,221	62.9
Democratic	Paula L. Calderon	34,697	34.0
Libertarian	Gregory James Bashem	3,190	3.1
Total votes		102,108	100.0
Republican hold			

=== 1996 ===
1996 California State Assembly 36th district election
Party	Candidate	Votes	%
Republican	George Runner	78,383	64.2
Democratic	David Cochran	43,746	35.8
Total votes		136,240	100.0
Republican hold			

=== 1994 ===
1994 California State Assembly 36th district election
Party	Candidate	Votes	%
Republican	William J. Knight (incumbent)	75,676	69.7
Democratic	James L. Hutchins	26,913	24.8
Libertarian	Eric Fussell	5,979	5.5
Total votes		108,568	100.0
Republican hold			

=== 1992 ===
1992 California State Assembly 36th district election
Party	Candidate	Votes	%
Republican	William J. Knight	79,718	58.2
Democratic	Arnie Rodio	45,893	33.5
Libertarian	Ronald Tisbert	11,403	8.3
Total votes		137,014	100.0
Republican hold			

=== 1990 ===
1990 California State Assembly 36th district election
Party	Candidate	Votes	%
Republican	Tom McClintock (incumbent)	66,081	58.6
Democratic	Ginnie Connell	40,356	35.8
Libertarian	David A. Harner	6,371	5.6
Total votes		112,808	100.0
Republican hold			

== See also ==
- California State Assembly
- California State Assembly districts
- Districts in California
