= John Wessling =

American politician

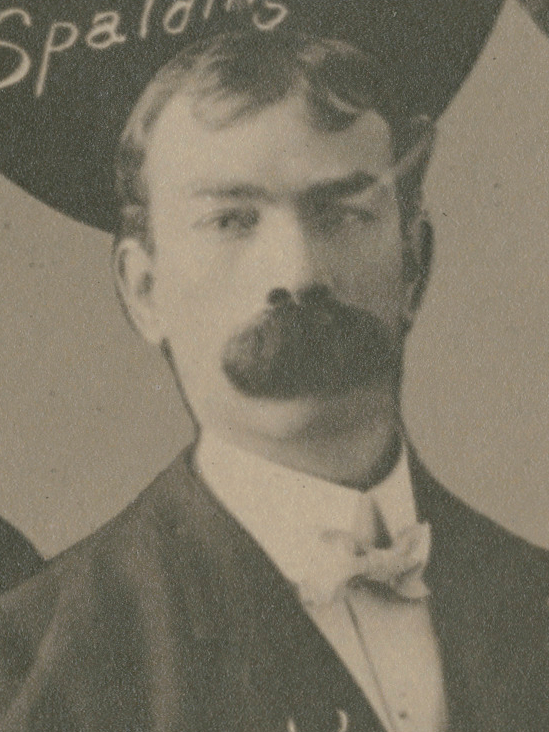
- Wessling c. 1907

Member of the California State Assembly from the 36th district
- In office January 7, 1907 – January 4, 1909
- Preceded by: Eugene E. Pfaeffle
- Succeeded by: Henry Nixon Beatty

Personal details
- Born: July 10, 1875 San Francisco, California, U.S.
- Died: November 20, 1950 (aged 75) San Francisco, California, U.S.
- Party: Independence; Republican
- Occupation: Roofer

John Wessling (July 10, 1875 – November 20, 1950) was an American roofer and politician who served one term in the California State Assembly from 1907 to 1909. He was one of several candidates for the state legislature endorsed by the Independence League in 1906, and the only one elected without the support of another party. He did not stand for re-election in 1908.
