= John N. Anderson =

American politician

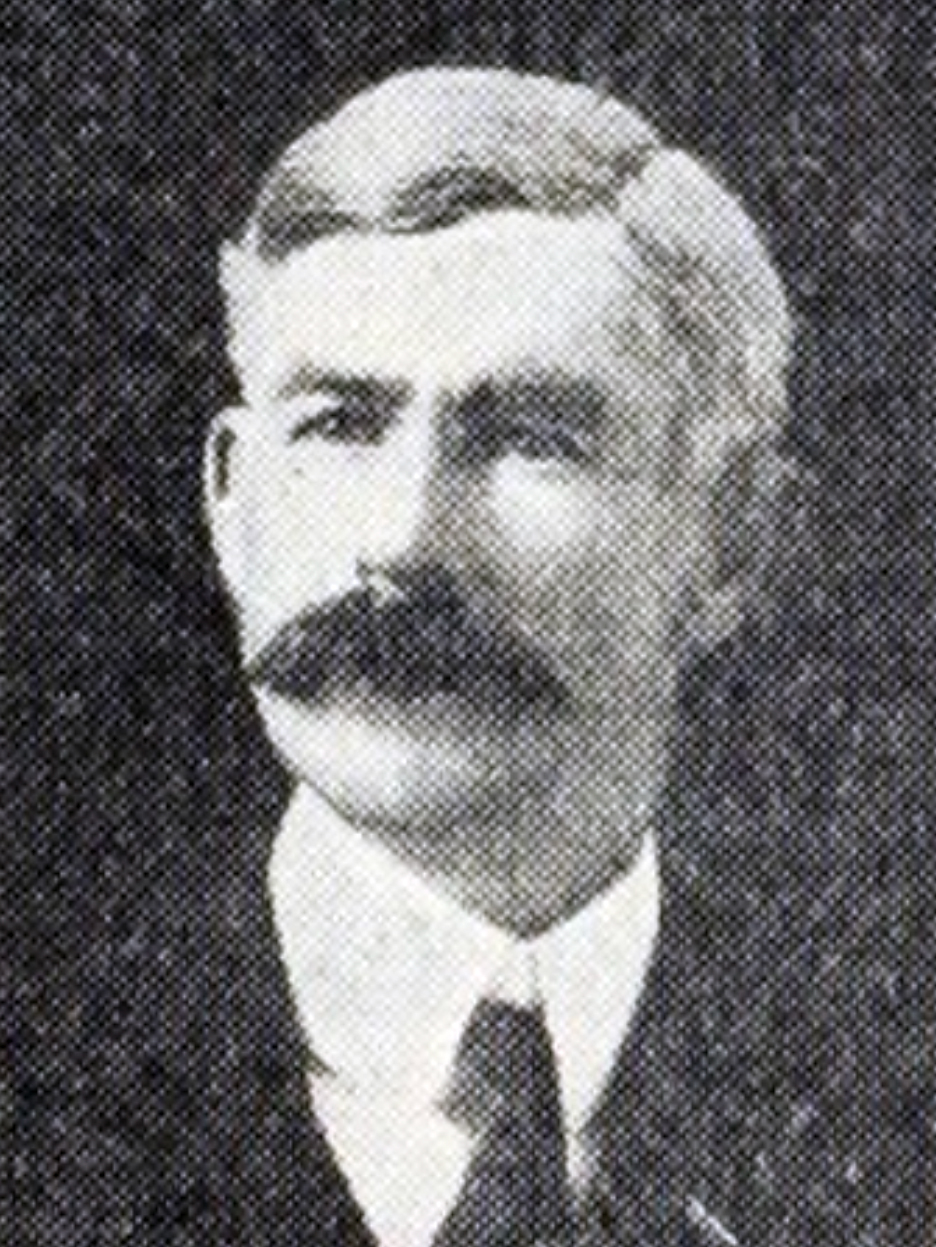
- Anderson in 1907

Member of the California Senate from the 39th district
- In office January 6, 1913 – January 8, 1917
- Preceded by: Miguel Estudillo
- Succeeded by: Samuel Cary Evans Jr.
- In office January 2, 1905 – January 4, 1909
- Preceded by: Albert A. Caldwell
- Succeeded by: Miguel Estudillo

Personal details
- Born: July 15, 1864 Keene, Canada West
- Died: 1936 (aged 71–72) Orange County, California, U.S.
- Party: Republican
- Spouse: Elizabeth H. Millar

John Nelson Anderson (July 15, 1864 – 1936) was an American politician who served in the California State Senate for the 38th district and was born in pre-Confederation Province of Canada.
