= Tom Lackey =

American politician from California

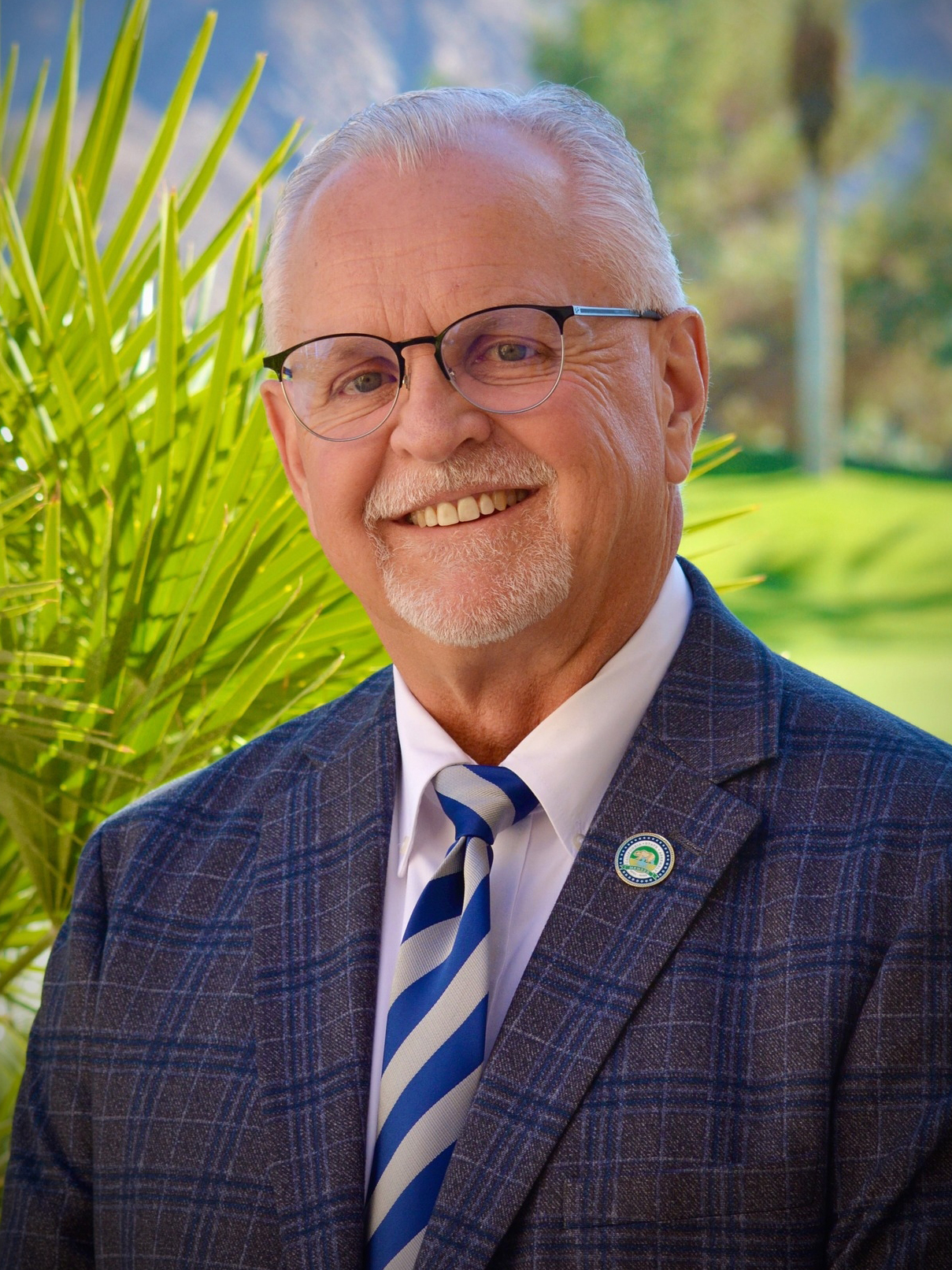

Member of the California State Assembly
- Incumbent
- Assumed office December 1, 2014
- Preceded by: Steve Fox
- Succeeded by: Charles Hughes (elect)
- Constituency: 36th district (2014–2022); 34th district (2022–2026)

Personal details
- Born: March 12, 1959 (age 67) Boron, California, U.S.
- Party: Republican
- Spouse: Linda Lackey
- Children: 2
- Education: Utah State University (BA)
- Website: Campaign website

Thomas W. Lackey (born March 12, 1959) is an American teacher, law enforcement officer and politician currently serving in the California State Assembly. He is a Republican representing the 34th district, encompassing parts of Antelope Valley, Victor Valley, the San Bernardino Mountains, and the High Desert including Barstow and Twentynine Palms to the Nevada state line. Prior to being elected to the State Assembly, he served on the Palmdale Elementary School Board and the Palmdale City Council. As of 2026, Lackey is term-limited in the California State Assembly and is not eligible to run for re-election in that year’s contests for the 34th district seat.

== Background ==
Tom Lackey grew up in the small town of Boron, California, where his father was a dentist. In high school, Lackey became an Eagle Scout and was active in student government. He later received a Bachelor's degree in Special Education from Utah State University after spending two years on an overseas missionary trip. After graduating, Lackey became an elementary school special education teacher. Eventually, Lackey would go from the classroom to a career in law enforcement, spending 28 years as an officer with the California Highway Patrol.

Lackey began his career in local elected office as a Trustee for the Palmdale Elementary School Board. He later was elected to the Palmdale City Council in 2005. While a City Councilman, Lackey served as a city appointee to the California Contract Cities Association, the Antelope Valley Crime Task Force, Antelope Valley Transit Authority Board, and the Antelope Valley Human Relations Task Force. In 2012, Lackey ran for the California State Assembly, but was defeated in the primary by Lancaster City Councilman Ron Smith, who lost the general election in an upset. In 2014, Lackey was elected to the California State Assembly representing the 36th Assembly District.

== California State Assembly ==
In 2014, Lackey announced he planned to run for 36th California State Assembly District against the incumbent Steve Fox who was considered one of the most vulnerable democrats in the legislature. The race was one of the costliest of the 2014 elections with both campaigns and independent expenditures spending a combined $2.2 million. Lackey defeated Fox with 60% of the vote to Fox's 40%. He was sworn into office on December 5, 2014. Lackey began his term by declining a pay increase that was approved for Legislators' salaries. He was one of six Assembly members to decline the raise. Lackey authored a roadside "drug breathalyzer" bill, Assembly Bill 1356 that was rejected by state legislators "...in large part because THC levels are not good indicators of intoxication..." Lackey also co-authored the bi-partisan and historic Medical Marijuana Safety and Regulation Act (AB 266) in 2015. Part of a package of laws intended to create a statewide framework for regulating medical marijuana. Part of the law is aimed at addressing the proliferation of drugged driving in California and is funding a study at UC San Diego to create tools to recognize marijuana-impairment in drivers.

In October 2025, Governor Gavin Newsom signed into law several bills sponsored by Lackey, including legislation addressing burglary tools and expanding mandatory reporting requirements for child abuse by talent agents, managers, and coaches.

The California Police Chiefs Association named Lackey their 2015 Legislator of the Year for his promotion of public safety and his efforts to curb driving under the influence of drugs and alcohol. He also received the 2015 Legislator of Year award from the special education advocacy group “Easter Seals" organization for his leadership in successfully advocating for increased funding for special needs Californians.

In the Assembly, Lackey serves as Vice Chair of the Local Government Committee, Vice Chair of the Public Safety Committee, and on the committees on Accountability and Administrative Review, Aging & Long-Term Care, Budget and Government Organization.

== Electoral history ==
2012 California State Assembly 36th district primary election
Primary election
Party	Candidate	Votes	%
Republican	Ron Smith	15,097	35.1
Democratic	Steve Fox	14,160	32.9
Republican	Tom Lackey	13,795	32.0
Total votes		43,052	100.0

2014 California State Assembly 36th district election
Primary election
Party	Candidate	Votes	%
Republican	Tom Lackey	15,095	41.1
Democratic	Steve Fox (incumbent)	12,055	32.8
Republican	JD Kennedy	4,460	12.2
Republican	Suzette M. Martinez	3,390	9.2
Democratic	Kermit F. Franklin	1,706	4.6
Total votes		36,706	100.0
General election
Republican	Tom Lackey	42,107	60.2
Democratic	Steve Fox (incumbent)	27,866	39.8
Total votes		69,973	100.0
Republican gain from Democratic			

2016 California State Assembly 36th district election
Primary election
Party	Candidate	Votes	%
Republican	Tom Lackey (incumbent)	35,019	48.2
Democratic	Steve Fox	21,541	29.6
Democratic	Darren W. Parker	11,236	15.5
Democratic	Ollie M. McCaulley	4,891	6.7
Total votes		72,687	100.0
General election
Republican	Tom Lackey (incumbent)	77,801	53.1
Democratic	Steve Fox	68,755	46.9
Total votes		146,556	100.0
Republican hold			

2018 California State Assembly 36th district election
Primary election
Party	Candidate	Votes	%
Republican	Tom Lackey (incumbent)	35,628	60.3
Democratic	Steve Fox	23,447	39.7
Total votes		59,075	100.0
General election
Republican	Tom Lackey (incumbent)	66,584	52.1
Democratic	Steve Fox	61,310	47.9
Total votes		127,894	100.0
Republican hold			

2020 California State Assembly 36th district election
Primary election
Party	Candidate	Votes	%
Republican	Tom Lackey (incumbent)	45,255	53.0
Democratic	Steve Fox	14,771	17.3
Democratic	Johnathon Ervin	6,615	7.8
Democratic	Diedra M. Greenaway	5,084	6.0
Democratic	Michael P. Rives	4,055	4.7
Democratic	Ollie M. McCaulley	3,729	4.4
Democratic	Lourdes Everett	3,405	4.0
Democratic	Eric Andrew Ohlsen	2,440	2.9
Total votes		85,354	100.0
General election
Republican	Tom Lackey (incumbent)	102,442	55.2
Democratic	Steve Fox	83,240	44.8
Total votes		185,682	100.0
Republican hold			

2022 California State Assembly 34th district election
Primary election
Party	Candidate	Votes	%
Republican	Thurston Smith (incumbent)	23,663	31.1
Republican	Tom Lackey (incumbent)	22,622	29.7
Democratic	Rita Ramirez Dean	20,384	26.8
Democratic	Raj Kahlon	4,063	5.3
Republican	Paul Fournier	3,189	4.2
No party preference	Roger LaPlante	2,122	2.8
Total votes		76,043	100.0
General election
Republican	Tom Lackey (incumbent)	63,840	56.5
Republican	Thurston Smith (incumbent)	49,183	43.5
Total votes		113,023	100.0
Republican hold			

2024 California State Assembly 34th district election
Primary election
Party	Candidate	Votes	%
Republican	Tom Lackey (incumbent)	58,283	66.1
Democratic	Ricardo Ortega	29,848	33.9
Total votes		88,131	100.0
General election
Republican	Tom Lackey (incumbent)	117,751	62.0
Democratic	Ricardo Ortega	72,152	38.0
Total votes		189,903	100.0
Republican hold			
