= Ben Hulse =

American politician (1894–1961)

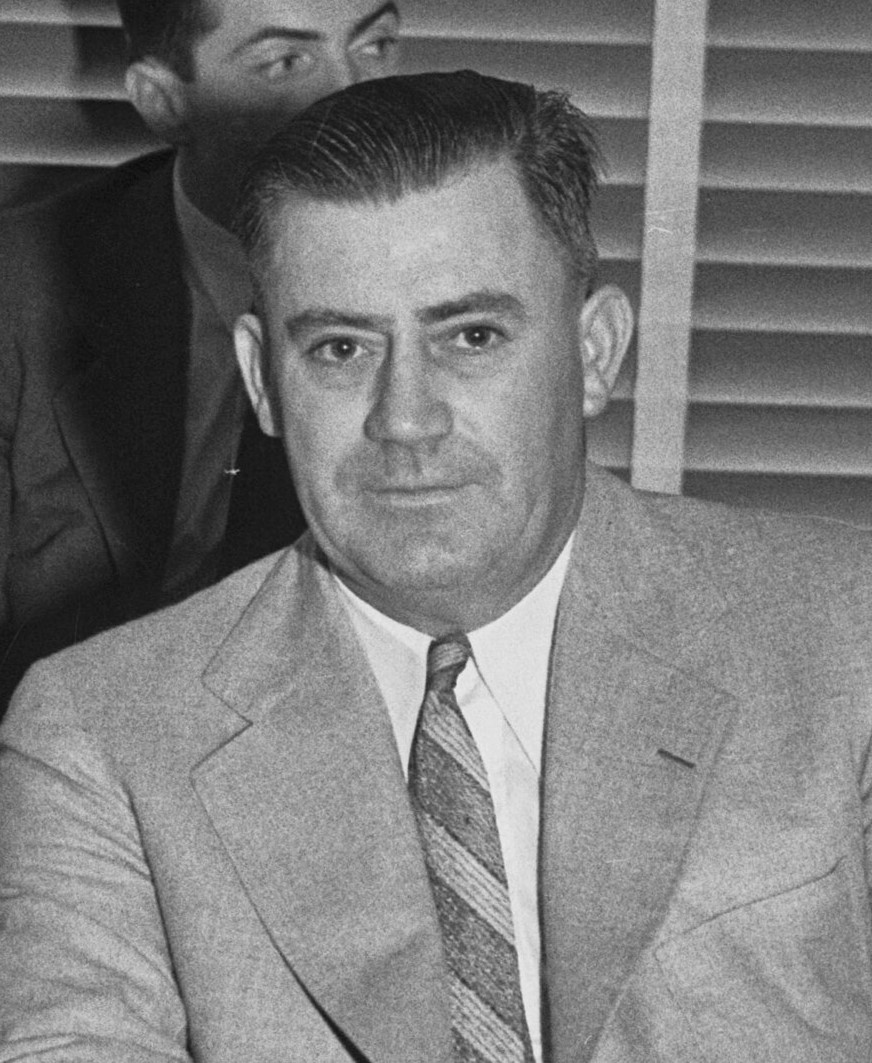
- Hulse in 1935

40th President pro tempore of the California State Senate
- In office January 3, 1955 – April 5, 1956
- Preceded by: Clarence C. Ward
- Succeeded by: Hugh M. Burns

Member of the California State Senate from the 39th district
- In office January 8, 1945 – January 7, 1957
- Preceded by: Emile G. Luckey
- Succeeded by: John William Beard
- In office January 2, 1933 – January 4, 1937
- Preceded by: Nelson T. Edwards
- Succeeded by: Edward H. Law

Personal details
- Born: September 24, 1894 near Fayetteville, Arkansas, U.S.
- Died: March 2, 1961 (aged 66) El Centro, California, U.S.
- Party: Republican
- Spouse(s): Bessie Menser (1919–1935) Laura (m. ?)
- Occupation: owner of farm implement and car dealerships

Benjamin Harrison Hulse (1894–1961) was a California politician. He represented the 39th district in the California State Senate for 12 years, including two years (1955–56) as Senate President Pro Tem. He was a Republican.

== Personal life ==
Hulse was born and raised on a farm near Fayetteville in Washington County, Arkansas. His parents were John Hulse, a wealthy farmer and U.S. marshall, and Drusilla (Delano) Hulse. With just a high school education, he came to California as a young man. He worked at a machine shop in Stockton for two years, then moved to Imperial County in 1910, where he began to sell tractors and Ford cars in Calexico, El Centro and Yuma. By 1920 his dealerships (Hulse and Dick in Yuma, Hulse and Anderson in El Centro) were important in promoting the agricultural development of Imperial County.

He married Bessie Phenia in 1919; they lived in Imperial. He was an Elk and a Mason. He died at a hospital in El Centro in 1961 at the age of 66.

== Political career ==
He served on the local school board and the Imperial County Board of Supervisors. He was elected to the Senate in 1932 and served four years. He was then re-elected in 1944, 1948, and 1952. He was known as "the watchdog of the treasury" during his years in the Senate, serving on the taxation and other committees. He was elected Senate President Pro Tem in 1955. He retired from the Senate on March 14, 1956.

== Recognition ==
- Ben Hulse Elementary School in Imperial, California, is named for him.
- A stretch of California State Route 78 is named the Ben Hulse Highway.
