= Imperial, California =

City in California, United States

- City
- City of Imperial
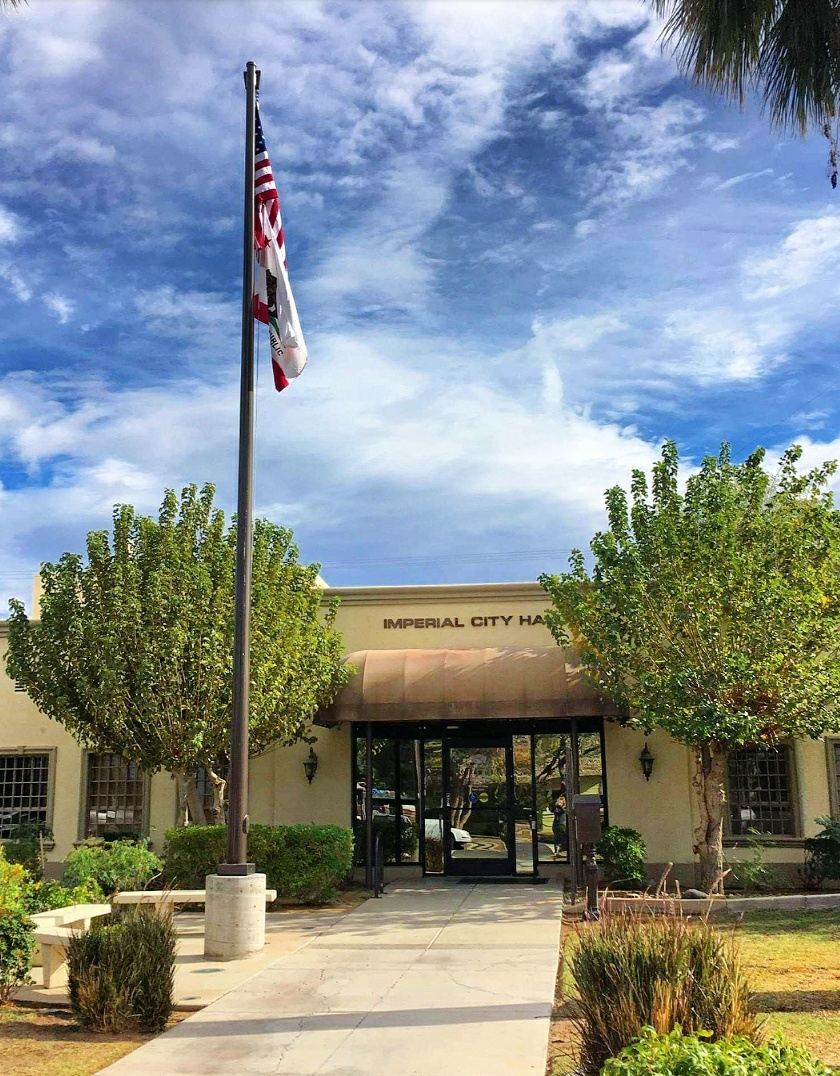
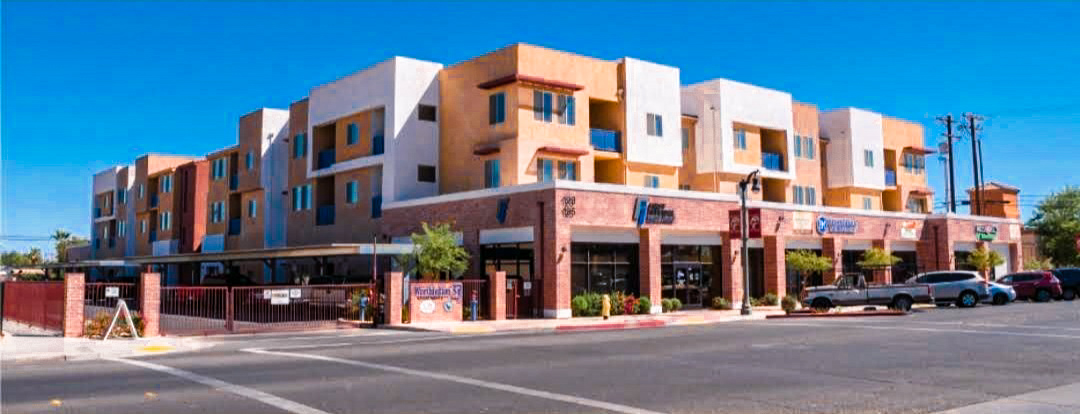
- Top: Imperial City Hall; Bottom: Worthington Square Imperial

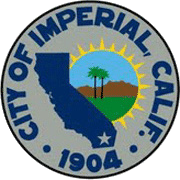
- Seal
- Interactive map of Imperial, California
- Location within California Location within the United States
- Coordinates: 32°50′51″N 115°34′10″W
- Country: United States
- State: California
- County: Imperial
- Incorporated: July 12, 1904

Government
  - Mayor: James Tucker

Area
  - City: 6.29 sq mi (16.29 km^{2})
  - Land: 6.29 sq mi (16.29 km^{2})
  - Water: 0 sq mi (0.00 km^{2}) 0%
- Elevation: −59 ft (−18 m)

Population (2020)
  - City: 20,263
  - Density: 3,222/sq mi (1,244/km^{2})
  - Metro: 175,000
- Time zone: UTC-08:00 (PST)
  - Summer (DST): UTC-07:00 (PDT)
- ZIP code: 92251
- Area code: 442/760
- FIPS code: 06-36280
- GNIS feature IDs: 1652726, 2410097
- Website: www.imperial.ca.gov

Imperial is a city in Imperial County, California, 4 miles (6.4 km) north of El Centro.

As of the 2020 census, the city had a population of 20,263. It is part of the El Centro metropolitan area. In 2016, Imperial was the fourth fastest-growing city in the state, gaining 4.1 percent more residents from January 1, 2015, to January 1, 2016. It compares to Imperial County's growth of 1.3 percent and Brawley's growth of 1.2 percent.

== History ==
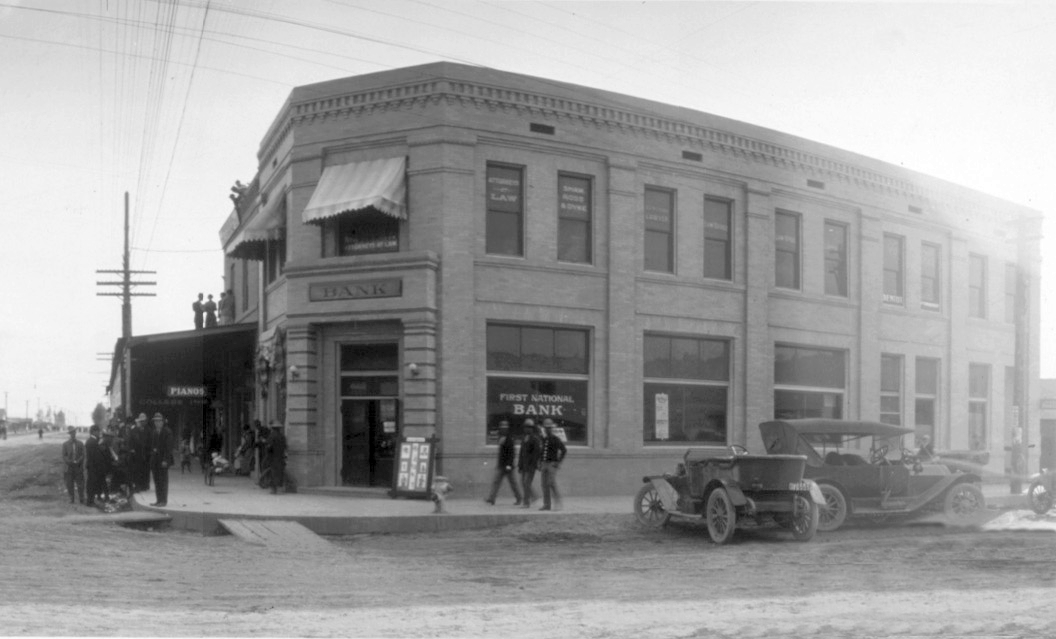
Downtown Imperial Business Center (at the intersection of what is now Imperial Avenue and Barioni Blvd.) circa 1913

Imperial was created by the Imperial Land Company and was named by George Chaffey. Imperial's first post office opened in 1901. Imperial incorporated in 1904. The first mayor of Imperial was Allison Peck.

The town-site of Imperial was plotted in 1902 for home and commercial businesses. Its first buildings included a printing press, drug store, grocery store, brick building, and church. The city can also boast of having the first school in the valley and the first Chamber of Commerce.

The City of Imperial was incorporated July 12, 1904, thus being the first city in the valley to incorporate. The city was originally thought to become the county seat, but lost out to the City of El Centro in 1907.

Imperial through the years became the location for the home of the Imperial Irrigation District, the California Mid-Winter Fair and the Imperial County Airport. Also several businesses were established in the city. Imperial was devastated by earthquakes in 1916 and 1940. In 1979, Another earthquake destroyed many of the old buildings in the downtown business area, including City Hall. The city was slow to rebuild the business district following the quake, taking several years.

In June 2014, a McDonnell Douglas AV-8B Harrier II from Marine Corps Air Station Yuma crashed in a residential area. The pilot ejected safely, and no residents were injured.

== Geography ==
According to the United States Census Bureau, the city has a total area of 6.3 square miles (16 km^{2}), all land. Imperial is located in the Imperial Valley (considered locally as synonymous with Imperial County). The city is 59.5 feet (18.14 m) below sea level. The Imperial Valley is in the Colorado Desert, an extension of the larger Sonoran Desert.

The agriculture industry's demand for water is supplied by canals diverting water from the nearby Colorado River. The Salton Sea was created after a 1905 flood from the Colorado River.

In this region, the geology is dominated by the transition of the tectonic plate boundary from rift to transverse fault. The southernmost strands of the San Andreas Fault connect the northernmost extensions of the East Pacific Rise. Consequently, the region is subject to earthquakes, and the crust is being stretched, resulting in a sinking of the terrain over time.

=== Climate ===
Imperial has a hot desert climate, featuring long, extremely hot summers and mild winters. Imperial averages just about 3 inches of rain annually, with December being the wettest month. The North American Monsoon typically increases the humidity from July through September. At times, the climate can resemble that of tropical areas in the Caribbean. This leads to daily thunderstorms that can bring hail, downpours, lightning, and dust storms more commonly known as Haboob. During the eastern Pacific hurricane season, hurricanes occasionally track up the Baja California Peninsula and bring remnants of Tropical Storms through the desert that can result in flash flooding and heavy widespread thunderstorms. This can lead to significantly higher than normal precipitation, at times bringing heavy rain in short periods of time. The precipitation in the winter months is predominantly rain showers from the occasional winter storms. At times these storms bring cold temperatures to Imperial and surrounding cities, and mountain snowfall to the nearby mountains. Snow is almost totally unknown in the city, except for trace amount on December 12, 1932, and a very brief fall of sleet mixed with hail during a shower in December 1967. On average there are 3.7 days per year that drop below freezing. In the coldest month, December, the normal high temperature is 67.5 degrees with a low of 42.3. In the warmest month, August, the normal high temperature is 104.5 degrees with a low of 78.4.

Climate data for Imperial, California, 1991–2020 normals, extremes 1901–present
Month	Jan	Feb	Mar	Apr	May	Jun	Jul	Aug	Sep	Oct	Nov	Dec	Year
Record high °F (°C)	96 (36)	96 (36)	104 (40)	109 (43)	118 (48)	123 (51)	124 (51)	124 (51)	120 (49)	111 (44)	98 (37)	90 (32)	124 (51)
Mean maximum °F (°C)	80.6 (27.0)	83.9 (28.8)	92.1 (33.4)	99.7 (37.6)	105.0 (40.6)	112.6 (44.8)	114.6 (45.9)	113.6 (45.3)	110.4 (43.6)	101.8 (38.8)	89.9 (32.2)	79.1 (26.2)	115.9 (46.6)
Mean daily maximum °F (°C)	68.7 (20.4)	72.2 (22.3)	78.4 (25.8)	84.3 (29.1)	92.5 (33.6)	100.8 (38.2)	104.4 (40.2)	104.5 (40.3)	99.9 (37.7)	88.9 (31.6)	76.7 (24.8)	67.5 (19.7)	86.6 (30.3)
Daily mean °F (°C)	56.0 (13.3)	59.4 (15.2)	65.0 (18.3)	70.4 (21.3)	77.8 (25.4)	85.4 (29.7)	90.9 (32.7)	91.4 (33.0)	86.6 (30.3)	75.2 (24.0)	63.2 (17.3)	54.9 (12.7)	73.0 (22.8)
Mean daily minimum °F (°C)	43.3 (6.3)	46.6 (8.1)	51.5 (10.8)	56.4 (13.6)	63.0 (17.2)	70.0 (21.1)	77.3 (25.2)	78.4 (25.8)	73.2 (22.9)	61.4 (16.3)	49.8 (9.9)	42.3 (5.7)	59.4 (15.2)
Mean minimum °F (°C)	33.4 (0.8)	36.6 (2.6)	41.3 (5.2)	46.7 (8.2)	53.7 (12.1)	60.1 (15.6)	68.1 (20.1)	69.0 (20.6)	62.2 (16.8)	50.0 (10.0)	39.0 (3.9)	32.2 (0.1)	31.0 (−0.6)
Record low °F (°C)	16 (−9)	22 (−6)	30 (−1)	35 (2)	43 (6)	50 (10)	51 (11)	60 (16)	49 (9)	36 (2)	27 (−3)	21 (−6)	16 (−9)
Average precipitation inches (mm)	0.47 (12)	0.43 (11)	0.31 (7.9)	0.09 (2.3)	0.06 (1.5)	0.00 (0.00)	0.14 (3.6)	0.18 (4.6)	0.26 (6.6)	0.21 (5.3)	0.22 (5.6)	0.39 (9.9)	2.76 (70.3)
Average precipitation days (≥ 0.01 in)	3.2	2.7	1.9	0.7	0.3	0.1	0.8	1.4	1.1	0.9	1.3	2.8	17.2
Source 1: NOAA
Source 2: National Weather Service

== Demographics ==
Historical population
Census	Pop.	Note	%±
1910	1,257		—
1920	1,885		50.0%
1930	1,943		3.1%
1940	1,493		−23.2%
1950	1,759		17.8%
1960	2,658		51.1%
1970	3,094		16.4%
1980	3,451		11.5%
1990	4,113		19.2%
2000	7,560		83.8%
2010	14,758		95.2%
2020	20,263		37.3%
2024 (est.)	22,102	▲	9.1%
U.S. Decennial Census

=== 2020 census ===
As of the 2020 census, Imperial had a population of 20,263 and a population density of 3,221.5 inhabitants per square mile (1,243.8/km^{2}). The age distribution was 30.6% under the age of 18, 8.9% aged 18 to 24, 29.8% aged 25 to 44, 21.7% aged 45 to 64, and 9.0% who were 65 years of age or older. The median age was 32.7 years. For every 100 females there were 94.4 males, and for every 100 females age 18 and over there were 89.8 males age 18 and over.

The census reported that 99.8% of the population lived in households and 32 people (0.2%) were institutionalized. 99.8% of residents lived in urban areas, while 0.2% lived in rural areas.

There were 6,029 households, of which 53.5% had children under the age of 18 living in them. Of all households, 58.8% were married-couple households, 6.1% were cohabiting-couple households, 12.2% were households with a male householder and no spouse or partner present, and 22.9% were households with a female householder and no spouse or partner present. About 14.3% of all households were made up of individuals and 4.9% had someone living alone who was 65 years of age or older. The average household size was 3.36. There were 4,958 families (82.2% of all households).

There were 6,214 housing units at an average density of 987.9 units per square mile (381.4 units/km^{2}), of which 6,029 (97.0%) were occupied. Of occupied housing units, 69.6% were owner-occupied and 30.4% were occupied by renters. 3.0% of housing units were vacant. The homeowner vacancy rate was 0.7% and the rental vacancy rate was 2.8%.

Racial composition as of the 2020 census
Race	Number	Percent
White	5,774	28.5%
Black or African American	354	1.7%
American Indian and Alaska Native	334	1.6%
Asian	579	2.9%
Native Hawaiian and Other Pacific Islander	19	0.1%
Some other race	6,913	34.1%
Two or more races	6,290	31.0%
Hispanic or Latino (of any race)	16,757	82.7%

=== 2023 ACS 5-year estimates ===
In 2023, the US Census Bureau estimated that 25.9% of the population were foreign-born. Of all people aged 5 or older, 31.2% spoke only English at home, 64.9% spoke Spanish, 0.1% spoke other Indo-European languages, 2.9% spoke Asian or Pacific Islander languages, and 0.9% spoke other languages. Of those aged 25 or older, 82.9% were high school graduates and 20.3% had a bachelor's degree.

The median household income in 2023 was $83,214, and the per capita income was $28,599. About 10.7% of families and 12.4% of the population were below the poverty line.

=== 2010 census ===
The 2010 United States census reported that Imperial had a population of 14,758. The population density was 2,519.9 inhabitants per square mile (972.9/km^{2}). The racial makeup of Imperial was 9,298 (63.0%) White, 331 (2.2%) African American, 154 (1.0%) Native American, 370 (2.5%) Asian, 13 (0.1%) Pacific Islander, 3,783 (25.6%) from other races, and 809 (5.5%) from two or more races. The ethnic makeup of Imperial was 11,046 (74.8%) Hispanic or Latino of any race.

The Census reported that 14,727 people (99.8% of the population) lived in households, 0 (0%) lived in non-institutionalized group quarters, and 31 (0.2%) were institutionalized.

There were 4,405 households, out of which 2,464 (55.9%) had children under the age of 18 living in them, 2,669 (60.6%) were opposite-sex married couples living together, 697 (15.8%) had a female householder with no husband present, 255 (5.8%) had a male householder with no wife present. There were 268 (6.1%) unmarried opposite-sex partnerships, and 27 (0.6%) same-sex married couples or partnerships. 621 households (14.1%) were made up of individuals, and 181 (4.1%) had someone living alone who was 65 years of age or older. The average household size was 3.34. There were 3,621 families (82.2% of all households); the average family size was 3.69.

The population was spread out, with 4,927 people (33.4%) under the age of 18, 1,376 people (9.3%) aged 18 to 24, 4,618 people (31.3%) aged 25 to 44, 2,881 people (19.5%) aged 45 to 64, and 956 people (6.5%) who were 65 years of age or older. The median age was 29.9 years. For every 100 females, there were 95.6 males. For every 100 females age 18 and over, there were 92.3 males.

There were 4,751 housing units at an average density of 811.2 per square mile (313.2/km^{2}), of which 4,405 were occupied, of which 3,130 (71.1%) were owner-occupied, and 1,275 (28.9%) were occupied by renters. The homeowner vacancy rate was 4.5%; the rental vacancy rate was 4.5%. 10,692 people (72.4% of the population) lived in owner-occupied housing units and 4,035 people (27.3%) lived in rental housing units.

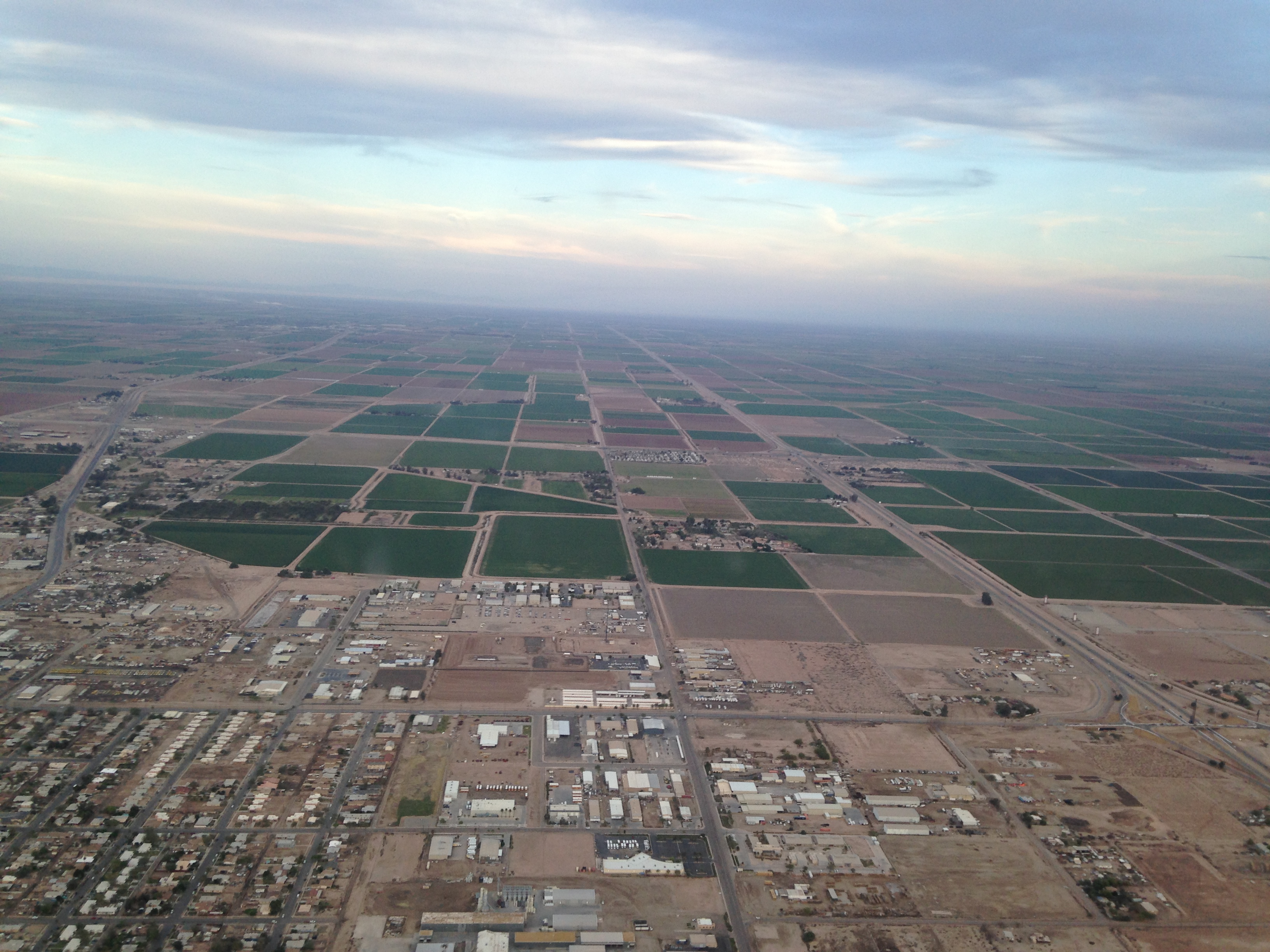
Aerial over Imperial/HWY 86

== Arts and culture ==
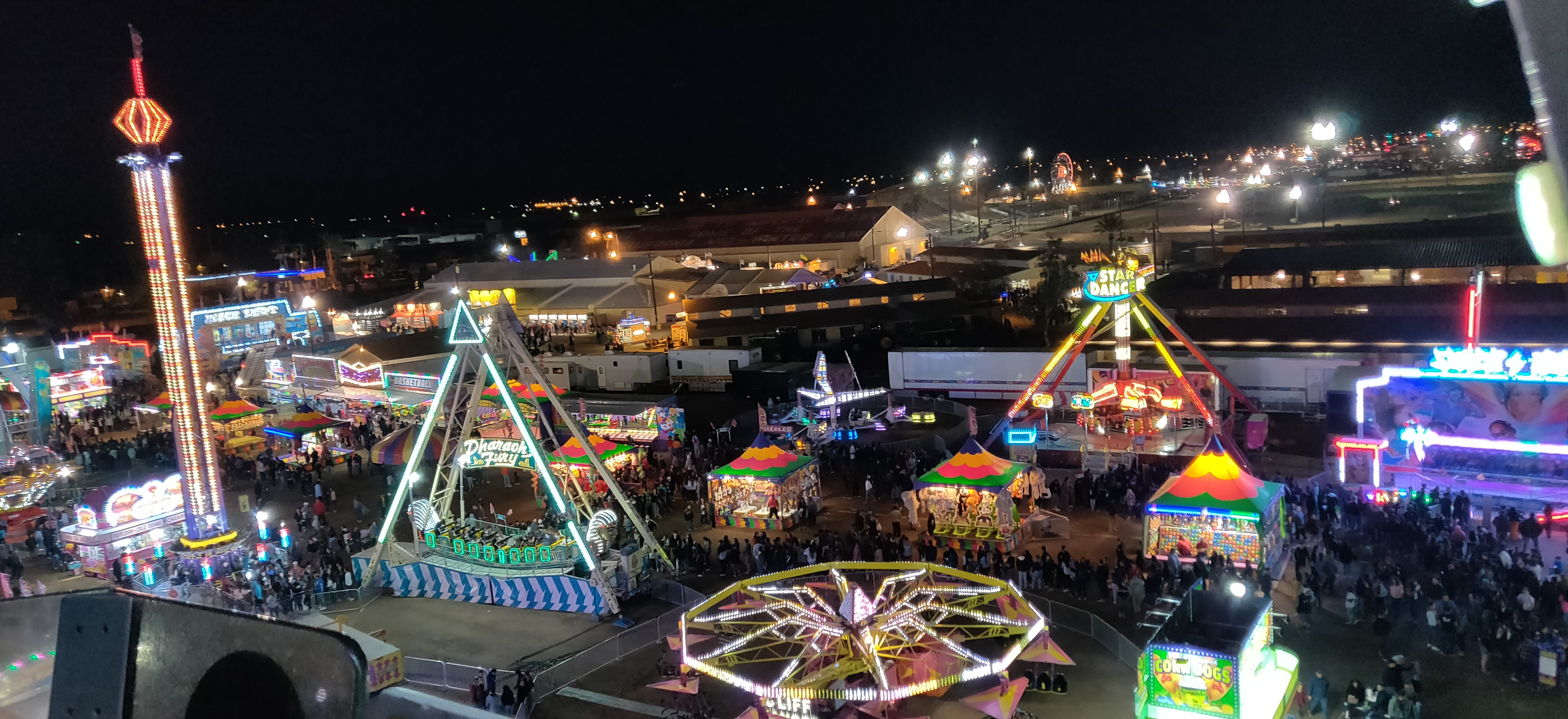
Mid-Winter Fair in Imperial

The annual California Mid-Winter Fair takes place in Imperial, often in February, and receives over 100,000 visitors.

The California Mid-Winter Fairgrounds is located in the heart of Imperial. The Mid-Winter Fair is the county's largest attended event. The fair lasts for a total of 10 days and is held at the end of February or beginning of March each year. The fairgrounds will host other events during the year such as; festivals, barbecues, car races, concerts, trade shows, and private parties. Visitors are from nearby Mexicali, Baja California, Mexico and numerous "snowbirds" across Southern California and the country (U.S.) temporarily reside in Imperial.

Imperial is also home to the Imperial Market Days.

Imperial Market Days is a signature, sponsorship funded event series put on by the City of Imperial to promote quality of life opportunities locally and throughout the Imperial Valley. Starting in October, the events take place in Downtown Imperial. These events are free for the public to attend. The synergy between local businesses and the community has attracted record crowds of up to 13,000 people throughout the region. Over 100 vendors participate in each event.

== Government ==
In the California State Legislature, Imperial is in the 18th senatorial district, represented by Democrat Steve Padilla, and the 36th Assembly district, represented by Republican Jeff Gonzalez.

In the United States House of Representatives, Imperial is in California's 25th congressional district, represented by Democrat Raul Ruiz.

== Infrastructure ==
=== Utilities ===
The city operates its own water and sewer system. Trash service is provided by Republic Services. Other utility providers for Imperial are Southern California Gas, Imperial Irrigation District, AT&T California, and Spectrum.

== Notable people ==
- Royce Freeman, football player
- Charles Harris Garrigues, newspaperman
- Ben Hulse, member of the California State Senate
- Andy Ruiz Jr., boxer, former WBA (Super), IBF, WBO, and IBO world heavyweight champion.
- Anthony Inder Mazeroll, academic, Former Professor of Biology and Environmental Sciences - Soka University of America, Co-Founder and Executive Director of the Amazon Research Center for Ornamental Fishes in Iquitos, Peru www.amazonresearchcenter.org

== See also ==
- San Diego–Imperial, California
- El Centro Metropolitan Area
- Imperial County Airport
