= Marilyn L. Flynn =

Former dean of USC School of Social Work

Marilyn Louise Flynn is the former dean of the USC Suzanne Dworak-Peck School of Social Work. During her 21-year tenure at the University of Southern California, she helped the grand challenges for social Work and society initiative, initiated computer-based educational and clinical technologies, established national online degree programs, and oversaw the school's renaming after a $60 million gift in 2016.

== Education ==
From the University of Illinois Urbana-Champaign, Flynn earned a PhD in 1976 and MSW in 1964. In 1960, she earned an AB in history and sociology from Roosevelt University?

== Career ==
Between 1992 and 1997, Flynn was Director of the Institute of Public Policy and Social Research as well as Michigan State University’s School of Social Work. She was an associate professor at the University of Michigan School of Social Work between 1985 and 1991.

Flynn was appointed USC Dean in 1997 and was only the second woman to hold that position. She established new graduate academic centers in West Los Angeles and San Diego, began a web based Master of Social Work program in 2010, began the first military social work specialization and created the first career services program for social workers.

=== Awards and honors ===
Flynn was named a Fellow of the Center for Advanced Studies at the University of Illinois Urbana-Champaign in 1983. She received the international Sarnat Prize for Advancement of Social Work and in 2015, the USC Provost’s Inaugural Prize for Innovation in Educational practice. In 2014, she was inducted into the California Social Work Hall of Distinction and elected to the Skull and Dagger All-University Honor Society at USC.

== Bribery case ==
Between 1997 and 2018, Flynn was a USC dean and tenured professor. In 2018, Los Angeles City Councilman Mark Ridley-Thomas, through his political campaign fund, gave $100,000 to Flynn’s school. The school then passed the money on to a think tank connected to the councilman’s son, Sebastian Ridley-Thomas. In June 2018, the school reported their concerns over possible inappropriate financial transactions to legal authorities. Flynn subsequently resigned in disgrace.

In 2022, Flynn agreed to plead guilty to federal bribery charges and was sentenced in June 2023 to three years probation and $150,000 in fines. Ridley-Thomas was sentenced to 42 months in prison.
