= Annalisa Enrile =

- Education: University of California, Los Angeles (UCLA)
- Occupations: Clinical associate professor, social worker, women's rights activist
- Employer: USC Suzanne Dworak-Peck School of Social Work
- Organization: Mariposa Center for Change (President)
- Known for: Advocacy against sex trafficking, interpersonal violence, and migrant labor exploitation
- Notable work: Ending Human Trafficking and Modern-Day Slavery: Freedom's Journey (2018)
- Awards: 100 Most Influential Filipina Women in the World (Global100)

Annalisa Enrile is a Filipina-American clinical associate professor at USC Suzanne Dworak-Peck School of Social Work. Her work focuses on combatting sex trafficking, interpersonal violence, and exploitative migrant labor. She is the President of the non-profit Mariposa Center for Change. The Filipina Women's Network named Enrile as one of the 100 Most Influential Filipina Women in the World (Global100) for her advocacy for the Filipino-American community. Her work has also been published in several peer-reviewed journals, including Pediatrics, Amerasia Journal the Global Studies Journal, and the Journal of Ethnic & Cultural Diversity in Social Work.

== Education ==
In 1996, Enrile graduated with a bachelor's degree in sociology at the University of California, Los Angeles (UCLA). That same year, she was a Fulbright Fellow in the Philippines where she studied domestic violence. In 2000, she graduated with a Master of Social Work (MSW) and later received her Doctorate (Ph.D.) from UCLA in Philosophy and Social Welfare in 2006.

== Career ==
In 2005, Enrile was the interim chair for GABRIELA Network (GABNet) - an organization focusing on US-Philippine women's solidarity and advocacy. She authored an open letter to President Obama on behalf of the organization speaking up against the result of the Subic rape case that same year. She had been working with GABNet since 1994. In 2008, she was honored as a "Vagina Warrior" for her work as the National Chair for the GABNet by the Fiipino Women's Network and Eve Ensler's VDAY foundation. Enrile would step down as chair in 2009.

In 2009, Enrile was awarded the Jane Addams Faculty Award by USC Suzanne Dworak-Peck School of Social Work. In 2010, she was awarded the Hutto Patterson Foundation Award for Distinguished Faculty by USC Suzanne Dworak-Peck School of Social Work.

In 2011, she was President of the Mariposa Center for Change, which was a non-profit organization that worked to incorporate “transnational and feminist empowerment model” into social services for women and children of color.

Enrile developed and led a Philippines immersion program at the USC Suzanne Dworak-Peck School of Social Work for graduate students to highlight how social work can be utilized in an international setting and attend to culturally specific needs. In 2013, she was named as one of the 100 Most Influential Filipina Women in the World (Global100) by Filipina Women's Network.

In 2018, she published a book she had edited called Ending human trafficking and modern-day slavery : freedom's journey.

In 2019, an article Enrile co-authored with Renee Smith-Maddox, titled "From Aspiration to Action: Advocacy and Innovation Practice for Social Justice in Online Social Work Education," was published in the book The Transformation of Social Work Education through Virtual Learning.

In 2021, she endorsed the USC Gould School of Law's International Human Rights Clinic's comprehensive reports regarding the development, creation, and implantation of U.S. anti-sex trafficking laws at the local, state, and national level.

In 2022, Enrile was named as a USC Title IX Trailblazers and featured in the Title IX: 50 Years of Progress online exhibit, which celebrates the 50th anniversary of passage of Title IX.

In May 2023, an article she had written titled "Identity Achievement for Adolescent Girls of Color" was published by Psychology Today.
