= Mark Ridley-Thomas =

American politician

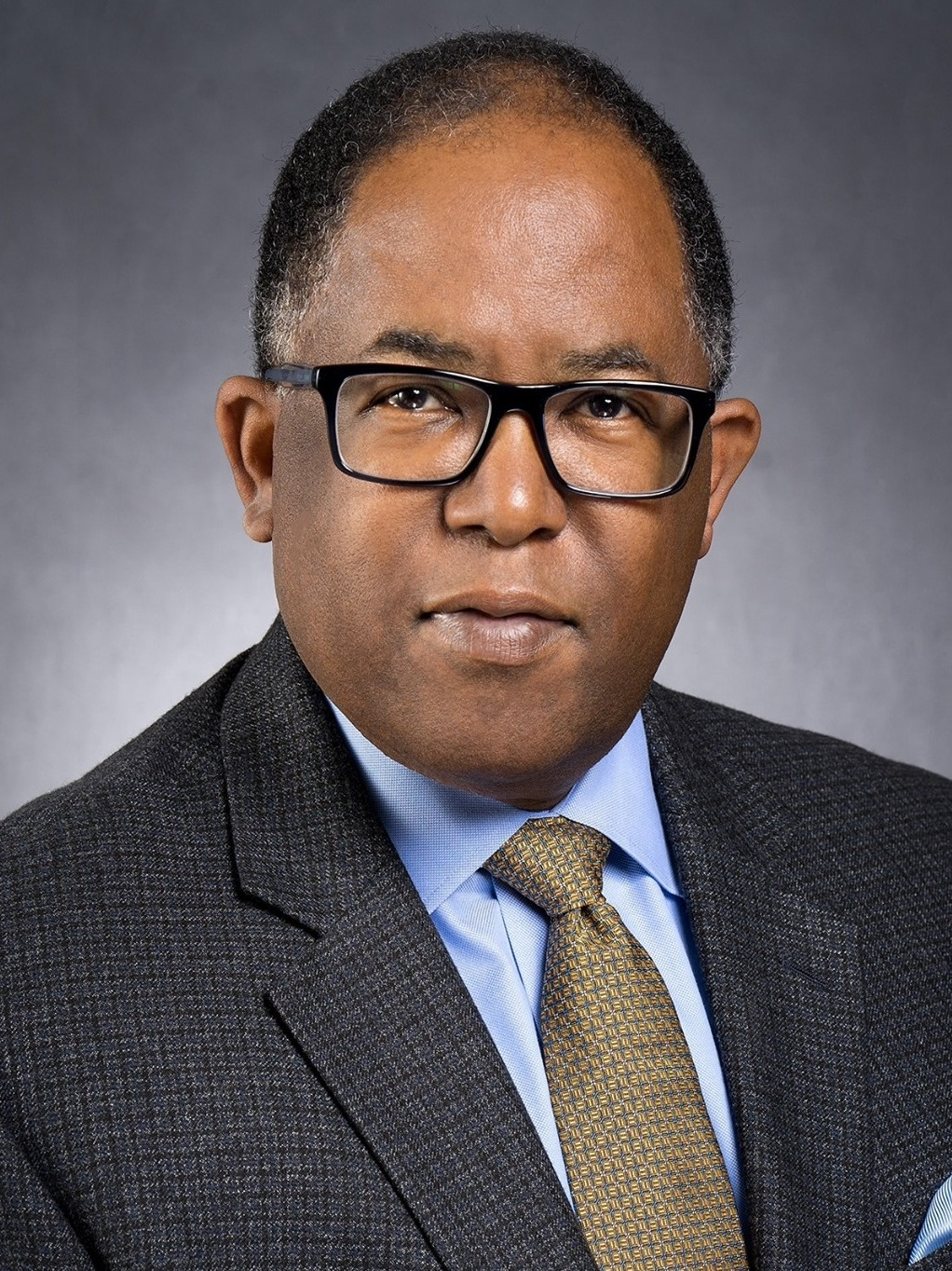
- Official portrait, 2020

Member of the Los Angeles City Council
- In office December 14, 2020 – March 17, 2022; Suspended: October 20, 2021 – March 17, 2022
- Preceded by: Herb Wesson
- Succeeded by: Herb Wesson
- Constituency: 10th district
- In office July 1, 1991 – December 1, 2002
- Preceded by: Robert C. Farrell
- Succeeded by: Bernard Parks
- Constituency: 8th district

President Pro Tempore of the Los Angeles City Council
- In office July 1, 2001 – December 1, 2002
- Preceded by: Ruth Galanter
- Succeeded by: Cindy Miscikowski

Member of the Los Angeles County Board of Supervisors from the 2nd District
- In office December 1, 2008 – December 6, 2020
- Preceded by: Yvonne Brathwaite Burke
- Succeeded by: Holly Mitchell

Chair of Los Angeles County
- In office December 6, 2016 – December 5, 2017
- Preceded by: Hilda Solis
- Succeeded by: Sheila Kuehl
- In office December 4, 2012 – December 3, 2013
- Preceded by: Michael D. Antonovich (Mayor)
- Succeeded by: Don Knabe

Chair Pro Tem of Los Angeles County
- In office December 8, 2015 – December 6, 2016
- Preceded by: Hilda Solis
- Succeeded by: Sheila Kuehl
- In office December 6, 2011 – December 4, 2012
- Preceded by: Zev Yaroslavsky
- Succeeded by: Don Knabe

Member of the California State Senate from the 26th district
- In office December 4, 2006 – November 30, 2008
- Preceded by: Kevin Murray
- Succeeded by: Curren D. Price Jr.

Member of the California State Assembly from the 48th district
- In office December 2, 2002 – November 30, 2006
- Preceded by: Roderick Wright
- Succeeded by: Mike Davis

Personal details
- Born: Mark Thomas; November 6, 1954 (age 71) Los Angeles, California, U.S.
- Party: Democratic
- Spouse: Avis Ridley-Thomas
- Children: Sebastian and Sinclair Ridley-Thomas
- Education: Immaculate Heart College; University of Southern California

Mark Ridley-Thomas (born November 6, 1954) is an American former politician. He spent three terms on the Los Angeles City Council from the 8th district from 1991 to 2002, and again for the 10th district from 2020 until his expulsion from the council in 2022. He was a member of the Los Angeles County Board of Supervisors for the 2nd Supervisorial District from 2008 to 2020, a California State Senator representing the 26th district from 2006 to 2008, and was a California State Assemblyman representing the 48th district from 2002 until 2006. He was Chairman of the Assembly Democratic Caucus.

Indicted on nineteen criminal counts in 2021, Ridley-Thomas was found guilty of seven of the charges on March 30, 2023, including conspiracy, bribery, honest services mail fraud, and four counts of honest services wire fraud "extracting special benefits for his son from USC while voting in support of motions and a contract sought by the university." On August 28, 2023, Ridley-Thomas was sentenced to 42 months in prison, which was upheld by the Ninth Circuit Court of Appeals in 2026.

== Education and early career ==
Ridley-Thomas is a graduate of Manual Arts High School in Los Angeles and earned a baccalaureate degree in Social Relations and a master's degree in Religious Studies from Immaculate Heart College. Ridley-Thomas went on to earn a Ph.D. in Social Ethics and Policy Analysis from the University of Southern California (1989).

After a brief stint as a high-school teacher, Ridley-Thomas was executive director of the Southern Christian Leadership Conference of Greater Los Angeles (1981–1991). During that period he also hosted a public affairs program on Pacifica Radio station KPFK-FM in Los Angeles.

== Political career ==
=== Los Angeles City Council (1991–2002) ===
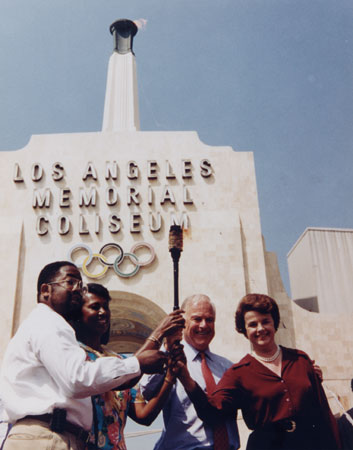
Ridley-Thomas with San Francisco Mayor Feinstein, Supervisor Burke, and Los Angeles Mayor Riordan in 1984

Ridley-Thomas served the first of three terms on the Los Angeles City Council, beginning in 1991, representing the city's 8th Council District. During his tenure on the council, he created the Eighth District Empowerment Congress. He founded the African American Voter Registration, Education, and Participation (AAVREP) in 2002, the largest organized effort to register African American and urban voters in the state of California in more than a decade. He was also the president pro tem of the council.

=== California State Assembly (2002–2006) ===
Ridley-Thomas would have been forced to leave the council in 2003 because of city term limits that prevented him from running for reelection, so he chose instead to run for a seat in the California State Assembly representing California's 48th district. In his 2002 election, he defeated his Republican opponent, Gerard T. Robinson, with more than 80% of the vote. In the Assembly, Ridley-Thomas served as chair of the Democratic caucus and was a major proponent of efforts to encourage an NFL team to move to the Los Angeles Memorial Coliseum, which is located in his district. He also sponsored a law that aided redevelopment in Exposition Park as part of a failed effort to attract a team. In the Assembly, Ridley-Thomas, as chairman of the Select Committee on the Los Angeles County Health Care Crisis, was a leader in addressing the problems facing the hospitals and health care system of Los Angeles, sponsoring a bill that would create the Office of Inspector General in an effort to detect and prevent fraud, waste and abuse in government agencies.

=== California State Senate (2006–2008) ===
In 2006, Ridley-Thomas announced that he was running for the California State Senate, vying for the 26th Senate district seat being vacated by term-limited Senator Kevin Murray. He defeated his opponent in the Democratic primary, Marvin C. McCoy, with more than 87% of the vote and faced no Republican opposition in the general election. In the Senate, Ridley-Thomas joined with a group of lawmakers who introduced a package of legislation designed to crack down on gang violence by allowing city and county prosecutors to employ tougher sentencing measures and increase asset forfeitures against gang members, authoring a bill which would make it easier for law enforcement officials to deal with racially motivated gang activity. He was also one of the lawmakers who called for tourists to boycott the LAX Hilton because of its efforts to overturn a city ordinance that would grant a living wage to airport-area hotel workers. Ridley-Thomas chaired the Committee on Business, Professions and Economic Development and its two subcommittees on Professional Sports and Entertainment, and The Economy, Workforce Preparation and Development. He also served on the Senate Appropriations; Energy, Utilities and Communications; Health; and Public Safety committees.

=== Los Angeles County Supervisor (2008–2020) ===
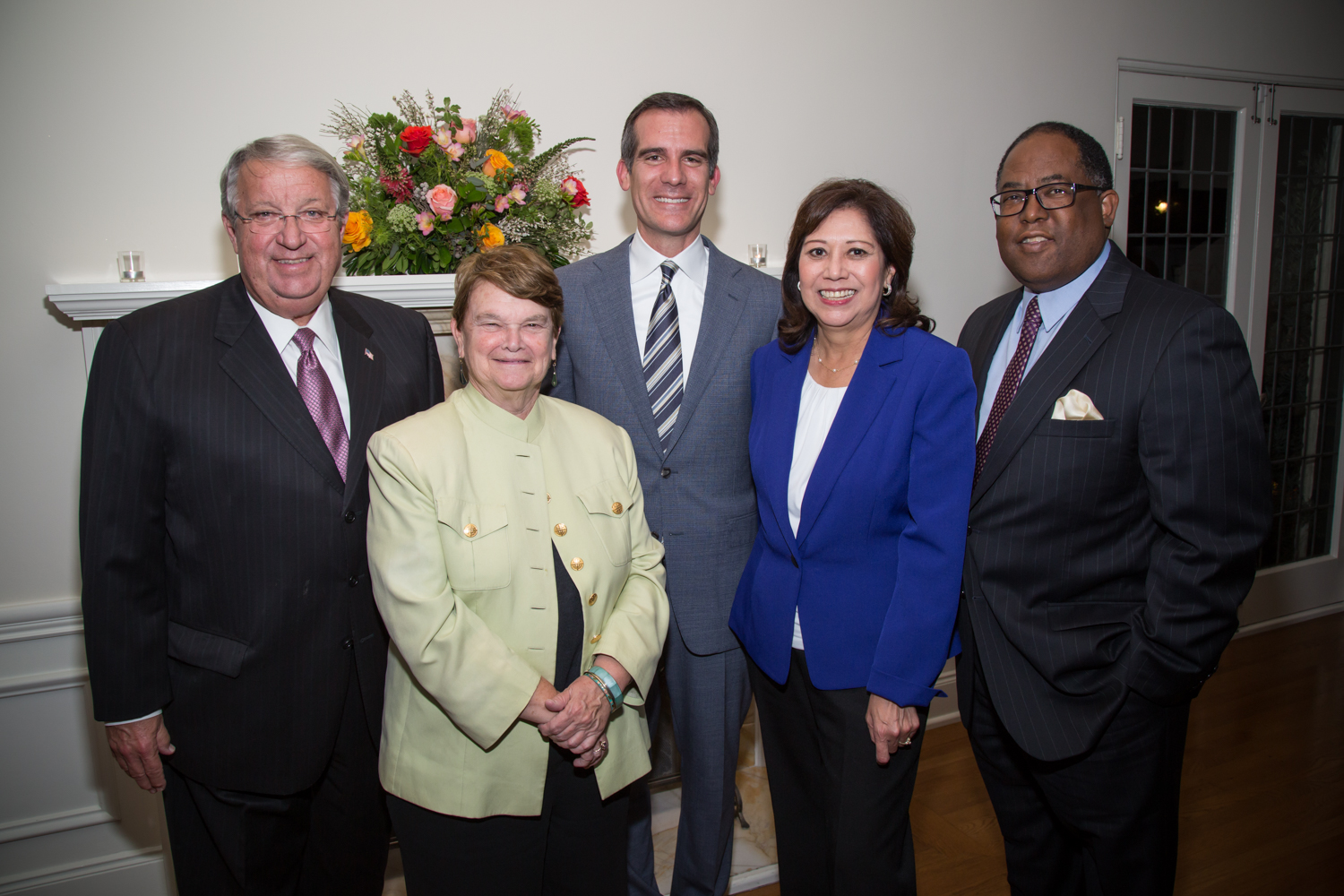
Ridley-Thomas with three of his Supervisor colleagues and Mayor Eric Garcetti in 2015

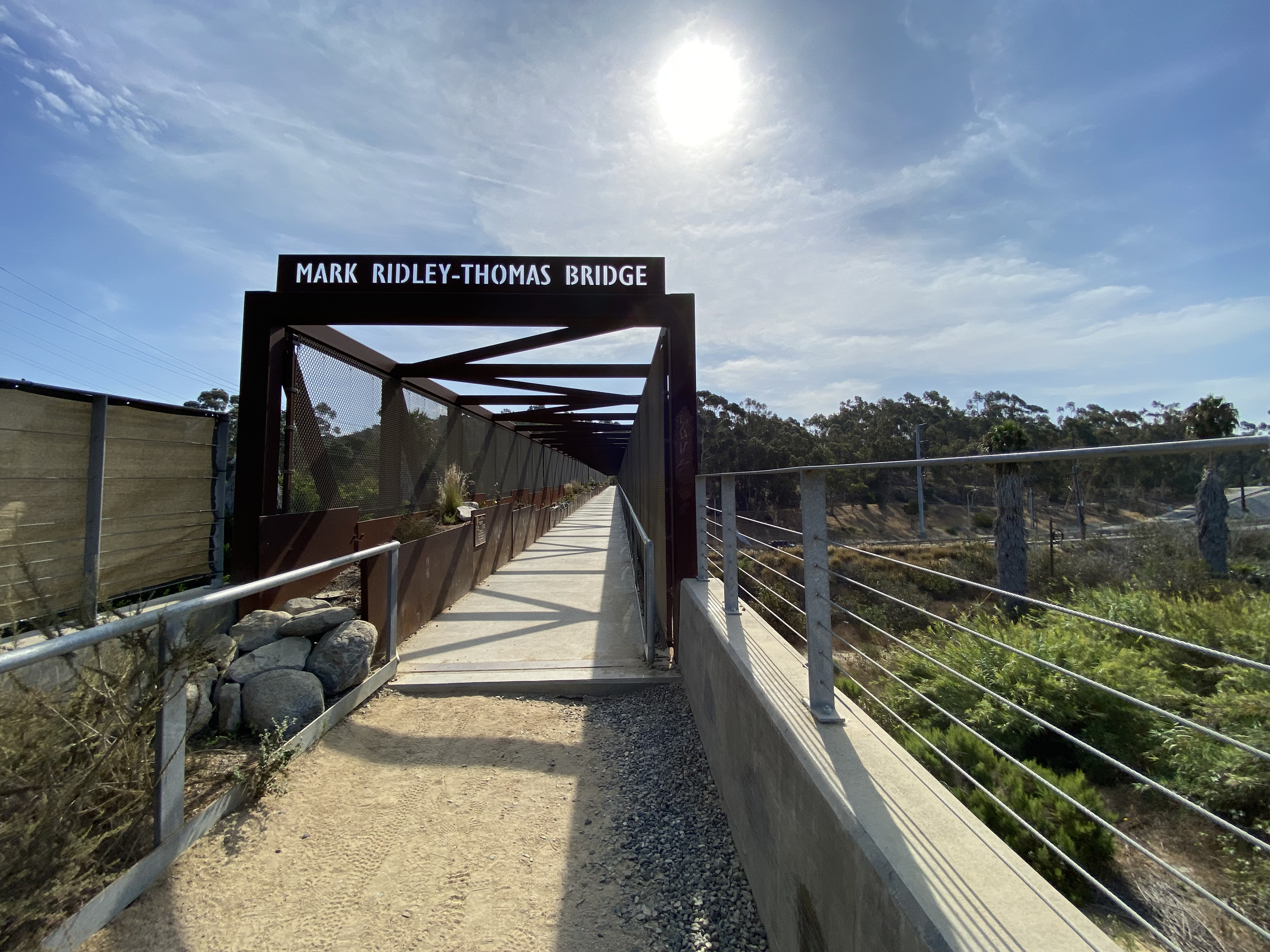
Mark Ridley Thomas Bridge, which comprises part of the Park to Playa Trail, Baldwin Hills, Los Angeles County, California

On October 25, 2007, Ridley-Thomas announced that he would be running for the Second District seat on the Los Angeles County Board of Supervisors being vacated by Supervisor Yvonne Brathwaite Burke. His most formidable opponent was former LAPD police chief Bernard C. Parks, the member of the Los Angeles City Council who replaced Ridley-Thomas when he was elected to the State Assembly. Ridley-Thomas was endorsed by the Los Angeles County Democratic Party, the area's labor unions (including the law enforcement unions), and numerous elected officials. Ridley-Thomas edged out Parks in the June 3 primary by a margin of 45% to 40%, but since neither candidate received a majority of the vote, the top two candidates advanced to a runoff election in November. Ridley-Thomas won a 62% to 38% victory over Parks. Ridley-Thomas became the first Black man ever elected to the Los Angeles County Board.

In 2012 Ridley-Thomas won a second term as Supervisor, due to no opposing candidate in the primary in the June primary.

Voters approved term limits on the Los Angeles County Board of Supervisors for three terms. Therefore, in March 2015, Ridley-Thomas sought and won his third and last term without any serious opposition.

=== Return to Los Angeles City Council (2020–2022) ===
Thomas was elected to a fourth 4-year term on the Los Angeles City Council in Council District 10 in the November 3, 2020 election. On October 18, 2021 Ridley-Thomas announced his intention to step back from his duties in order to fight charges of corruption; two days later, the Los Angeles city council formally voted to suspend him from his duties. Four months later, he was expelled from the council and replaced by Herb Wesson, who was appointed by City Council President Nury Martinez in 2022.

== Controversies ==
=== Korean store alcohol ban ===
In the aftermath of the 1992 L.A. riots, Ridley-Thomas sought to prevent convenience stores in South Central from selling alcohol. Many of these stores were Korean owned. He said at the time "We are going to use every means at our disposal to rid our community of these god-awful places of business, the kind of business they do is not good for the community." Korean owners took issue with his stance, claiming this was a case of the city punishing the victims.

=== $707,000 proposed office remodeling ===
In 2009 Ridley-Thomas was criticized, most notably by radio talk show hosts John and Ken, for his proposal and personal defense of plans to remodel his office through the spending of $707,000 in discretionary funds. Amidst the state budget crisis in California, John and Ken criticized Ridley-Thomas on December 21, 2009, saying that the discretionary funds, "[are] our money and we say no." As of March 12, 2010 the Los Angeles Times reported that Ridley-Thomas' renovation plans for his eighth-floor office were on hold.

=== $25,000 "Who's Who" listing ===
In 2010 Ridley-Thomas spent $25,000 in public funds to place himself and fourteen other county officials in the Who's Who edition of Black Los Angeles.

=== $25,000 campaign contribution after LACMA vote ===
In 2014, while county supervisor, Ridley-Thomas provided a key vote in favor of $125 million in public financing for a controversial redesign of the Los Angeles County Museum of Art (LACMA). This came after a meeting with Michael Lynton, then-CEO of Sony Pictures Entertainment and a LACMA trustee, who agreed to have Sony donate $25,000 to AAVREP, the political action committee founded by Ridley-Thomas. Sony's donation was three times larger than for any other California candidate or committee that year, and was understood to be in support of the school board campaign of a Ridley-Thomas protégé. While the funds were solicited and agreed to before the board election, the donation was made one month after the election so that it would not be publicly known during the campaign.

=== Excessive car washing ===
During the 2015 California drought Ridley-Thomas ordered one of his two county-provided black luxury cars (Chrysler 300 limited) to be washed twice a week. After Governor Jerry Brown's April mandate ordered a 25% reduction in urban water use, Ridley-Thomas increased the frequency of his sedan washing to over three times a week, while maintaining a wash schedule of 2.9 times per week for the second Chrysler sedan he maintains, more than any other county supervisor.

=== $100,000 USC bribery ===
In the spring of 2018, Ridley-Thomas' political campaign fund—Mark Ridley-Thomas Committee for a Better L.A.—gave $100,000 to the USC Suzanne Dworak-Peck School of Social Work. After the school received the money, the school's dean, Marilyn L. Flynn, reached out to Peter Manzo, CEO of United Ways of California advising that the school was sending a $100,000 donation to be put in the account of the Policy Research & Practice Initiative (PRPI), a think tank run by Ridley-Thomas' son and former assembly member Sebastian Ridley-Thomas. The LA Times reported that a concerned employee went to the university's compliance office in June, 2018 and reported alleged inappropriate financial transactions and agreements involving Flynn and an elected official. After consulting legal counsel, school administrators referred the incident to federal authorities for a criminal investigation.

=== Fossil fuel campaign contributions ===
During his 2020 race for Los Angeles City Council, environmental activists criticized Ridley-Thomas for his acceptance of donations from the fossil fuel industry. Of the major candidates in the race, Ridley-Thomas was the only one who accepted such donations. These donations included at least one from E&B Natural Resources Management, which operates a drill site in the district. While the other four candidates in the race called for the city to phase out urban oil drilling within 2,500 feet of homes and schools, Ridley-Thomas has opposed the idea of a citywide buffer.

== Federal corruption indictment and conviction ==
On October 13, 2021, the United States Attorney in the Central District of California announced that a federal grand jury had indicted Ridley-Thomas and Flynn in the United States District Court for the Central District of California for "a bribery scheme in which his son received substantial benefits from USC in exchange for Ridley-Thomas supporting county contracts and lucrative contract amendments with the university while he served on the Los Angeles County Board of Supervisors."

On March 30, 2023, Ridley-Thomas was found guilty of seven of the nineteen charges on March 30, 2023, including conspiracy, bribery, honest services mail fraud, and four counts of honest services wire fraud, for "extracting special benefits for his son from USC while voting in support of motions and a contract sought by the university." On August 28, 2023, Ridley-Thomas was sentenced to 42 months in prison. Ridley-Thomas's conviction was unanimously upheld by the Ninth Circuit Court of Appeals in August 2026. Since his sentencing, Ridley-Thomas was free pending resolution of the appeals process, sparking some controversy.

Political offices
Preceded by Robert C. Farrell	Los Angeles City Council; 8th District; July 1, 1991 – December 1, 2002	Succeeded by Bernard Parks
Preceded by Ruth Galanter	President Pro Tempore of the Los Angeles City Council; April 17, 2001 – June 30, 2003	Succeeded by Cindy Miscikowski
Preceded by Yvonne Brathwaite Burke	Los Angeles County Board of Supervisors; 2nd District; December 1, 2008 – December 6, 2020	Succeeded by Holly Mitchell
Preceded by Hilda Solis	Chair of Los Angeles County; December 6, 2016 – December 5, 2017; December 4, 2012 – December 3, 2013	Succeeded by Sheila Kuehl
Preceded by Michael D. Antonovich (Mayor)	Chair of Los Angeles County; December 6, 2016 – December 5, 2017; December 4, 2012 – December 3, 2013	Succeeded by Don Knabe
Preceded by Hilda Solis	Chair Pro Tem of Los Angeles County; December 8, 2015 – December 6, 2016; December 6, 2011 – December 4, 2012	Succeeded by Sheila Kuehl
Preceded by Zev Yaroslavsky	Chair Pro Tem of Los Angeles County; December 8, 2015 – December 6, 2016; December 6, 2011 – December 4, 2012	Succeeded by Don Knabe
California Senate
Preceded by Kevin Murray	California State Senate; 26th district December 4, 2006 – November 30, 2008	Succeeded by Curren D. Price Jr.
California Assembly
Preceded by Rod Wright	California State Assembly; 48th District; December 2, 2002 – November 30, 2006	Succeeded by Mike Davis
