= Center for Advanced Study =

Center for Advanced Study may refer to:

== U.S. ==
- Center for Advanced Study in the Visual Arts (CASVA) of the National Gallery of Art in Washington, D.C.
- Center for Advanced Defense Studies (CADS), a non-profit, non-governmental national security group in Washington, D.C.
- Center for Advanced Judaic Studies of the University of Pennsylvania
- Center for Advanced Studies and the Arts, a public consortium high school in Oak Park, Michigan
- Center for Advanced Study in the Behavioral Sciences, American interdisciplinary think tank in Stanford, California
- Center for Advanced Study of Language (CASL), College Park, Maryland
- Center for Advanced Visual Studies of the Massachusetts Institute of Technology
- Center for the Advanced Study of India (CASI), a research center on contemporary India at the University of Pennsylvania
- IBM Centers for Advanced Studies (CAS)
- Southwest Center for Advanced Studies (SCAS), former name of the University of Texas at Dallas

== Other countries ==
- Bangladesh Centre for Advanced Studies (BCAS), a think tank in Bangladesh
- Center for Advanced Studies in Engineering (CASE), a postgraduate institute in Islamabad, Pakistan
- Center for Advanced Studies on Puerto Rico and the Caribbean, a state university in Old San Juan, San Juan, Puerto Rico
- Center for Advanced Study in Theoretical Linguistics (CASTL) of the University of Tromsø, Norway
- Center for Advanced Study, Tsinghua University, Beijing, China
- National Center for Advanced Studies (NCAS), Sri Lanka
- Recife Center for Advanced Studies and Systems (CESAR), Development and Innovation institute in Brazil
