= Mike Davis (California politician) =

American politician

Member of the California State Assembly from the 48th district
- In office December 4, 2006 – November 30, 2012
- Preceded by: Mark Ridley-Thomas
- Succeeded by: Roger Hernandez

Personal details
- Born: April 2, 1957 (age 69) Charlotte, North Carolina
- Party: Democratic
- Spouse: Avis
- Education: California State University, Dominguez Hills; California State University, Northridge; John F. Kennedy School of Government; University of North Carolina University of Southern California

Mike Davis is an American politician who served in the California State Assembly. Davis was declared the fourth most loyal Democratic voter in the California State Legislature in the Sacramento Bee 2011–2012 listing. Davis, who is of African American heritage, serves as president pro tem of the City of Los Angeles Board of Public Works.

== Assembly ==
Davis won the June 3, 2006 primary against civil rights attorney Anthony Willoughby with over 53% of the vote. He won the general election against Republican Brenda Carol Green with over 88% of the vote.
