= California's 48th district =

California's 48th district may refer to:

- California's 48th congressional district
- California's 48th State Assembly district
