= Frank D. Lanterman =

American politician (1901–1981)

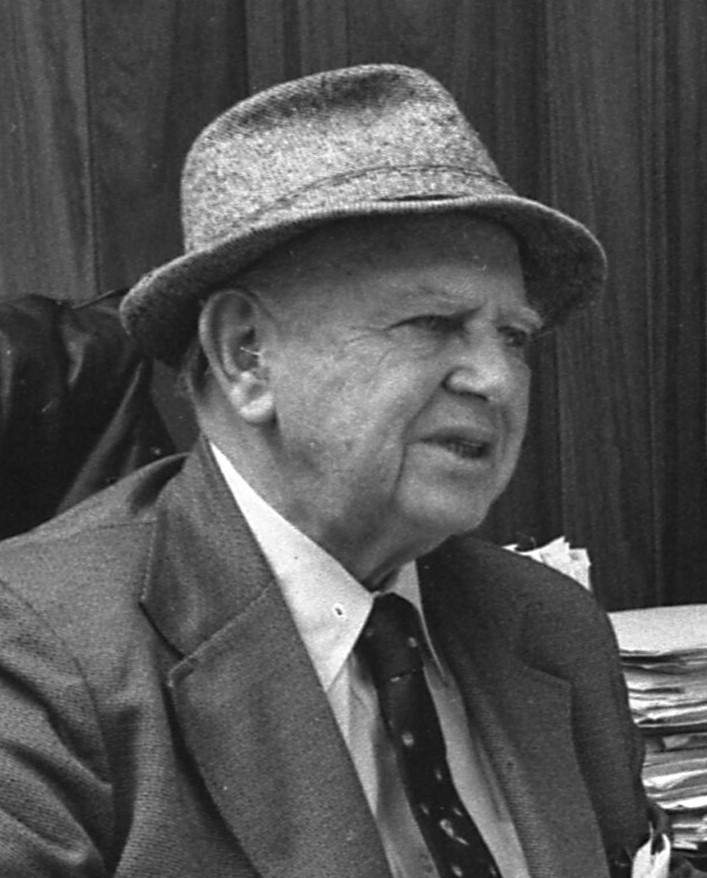
- Lanterman in 1978

Member of the California State Assembly from the 42nd district
- In office December 2, 1974 – November 30, 1978
- Preceded by: Bob Moretti
- Succeeded by: William H. Ivers

Member of the California State Assembly from the 47th district
- In office January 7, 1963 – November 30, 1974
- Preceded by: Bruce V. Reagan
- Succeeded by: Bill Greene

Member of the California State Assembly from the 48th district
- In office January 8, 1951 – January 7, 1963
- Preceded by: Bruce V. Reagan
- Succeeded by: George E. Danielson

Personal details
- Born: November 4, 1901 La Cañada Flintridge, California
- Died: April 29, 1981 (aged 79) La Cañada Flintridge, California
- Party: Republican
- Education: University of Southern California
- Profession: Politician

Frank D. Lanterman (November 4, 1901 – April 29, 1981) was an American politician who served in the California State Assembly for the 48th, 47th and 42nd districts from 1951 to 1978. He authored the Lanterman Developmental Disabilities Act.

== Biography ==
He was the grandson of the co-founder of La Cañada Flintridge, Jacob Lanterman. During his lifetime, he was a theater organist, a Republican activist, a real estate developer and a water company manager, as well as a politician. He also mentored many young politicians. One of his first jobs was playing the organ at the Alexander Theatre in Glendale, California for four years. In 1928, he went to Melbourne, Australia, where he became an organist at the State Theatre, where he remained for two years. He was also involved in Civil Defense work and served as an Air Raid Warden and Instructor for the Los Angeles County Civil Defense and Disaster Commission during World War II. He studied organ, piano and composition at the University of Southern California. Although he did not formally graduate from the university, he was given an honorary degree in Law.

== Political career ==
Frank Lanterman was elected to the California State Assembly in 1950 and was reelected to serve for fourteen consecutive terms. His original 48th Assembly District included Pasadena, South Pasadena, La Cañada Flintridge, La Crescenta, Montrose, and North Glendale. The author of approximately 400 bills, Lanterman sponsored groundbreaking legislation affecting issues such as water, transportation, noise and air pollution, and the needs of the aging and developmentally disabled. During his time in office, he served on the Committee on Municipal and County Government, the Transportation Committee, and the Budget Committee. His work with the transportation committee led to the naming of a portion of the upper Glendale freeway (2) as the Frank Lanterman Freeway.

He was the co-author of amendments to the 1911 Municipal Water District Act that allowed for the creation of the Foothill Municipal Water District serving the communities of La Cañada Flintridge, La Crescenta, and Altadena. At the time, all were unincorporated communities that would otherwise have been forced to annex themselves to surrounding cities if they wanted to receive water from the Metropolitan Water District. He also provided legislative relief for cities impacted economically by freeway projects.

In 1955, Frank Lanterman sponsored Assembly Bill 3574 requiring motor vehicles to be equipped with an approved pollution-reducing muffler. By 1960, he was supporting a bill requiring the installation of anti-smog devices on all motor vehicles. As a result, by 1966, California became the first state in the nation to have motor vehicle emission standards, leading to requirements for pollution controls.

He was especially known for his work relating to mental health and the rights of the handicapped. Lanterman was instrumental in the passage of the Short–Doyle Act of 1957 which created a system of community-based mental health services and provided the funding and structure to improve care and encourage deinstitutionalization. By the time of Lanterman's retirement in 1978, the number of patients in state mental hospitals was just 6,000, one-sixth of the 1957 total. The Lanterman-Petris-Short Act of 1967, authored by Frank Lanterman, Nicholas Petris, and Alan Short, severely limited involuntary commitment of people with mental health disorders. The Frank Lanterman Developmental Disabilities Services Act of 1969 gave persons with developmental disabilities the right to get the services and support they need to live like people without disabilities. It established regional centers so that disabled Californians could get the help they needed while living at home or on their own. One of the regional centers in Southern California was renamed in the 1970s as the Frank D. Lanterman Regional Center in honor of his efforts.

Frank Lanterman also authored legislation to implement California's Master Plan for Special Education, which expanded educational opportunities for the handicapped. Prior to the adoption of the Plan, children with disabilities could be denied access to a public education. The last bill he sponsored before his retirement in 1978 would have provided free care for pregnant women whose children might be born mentally ill or physically handicapped; it was vetoed by Governor Jerry Brown, whom Lanterman called "the jerry-built governor" or merely "Junior." Frank Lanterman's numerous public contributions to the state inspired such nicknames for him as "Mr. California," "The Sage of the Assembly," and "The Workhorse of Sacramento."

== Personal life ==
Frank Lanterman never married and lived for sixteen years at the Senator Hotel in Sacramento with occasional visits back to his home in La Cañada, California. He had a favorite brown suit which he wore week in and week out until, one day, it became so threadbare that it had to be replaced. The next day, Lanterman entered the Assembly wearing checked trousers and a navy blazer. At the close of the session, the speaker announced, "We close this session in memory of Frank Lanterman’s brown suit." When he retired in 1978, Lanterman was third on the Assembly's seniority list.

Frank Lanterman was active in his hometown of La Cañada Flintridge, California. He was involved with the La Cañada Congregational Church (formerly the Church of the Lighted Window) and its musical program. He also helped start the La Cañada Valley Chamber of Commerce in 1938 as a successor to the original LC Valley Improvement Association that had been formed in 1912. Frank Lanterman was honored as La Cañada's Citizen of the Year in 1959. His La Cañada home, the Lanterman House, is a historic site listed on the National Register of Historic Places since 1995. It is open to visitors several days a week throughout the year.

Lanterman also purchased the "Mighty Wurlitzer" organ that was originally installed in 1929 at the San Francisco Fox Theatre. The theater closed in 1963 and was set to be demolished. Lanterman purchased the organ in 1963 to save it and had it installed in his home in La Cañada. (That "Mightiest of Mighty Wurlitzers" was relocated to the Hollywood El Capitan Theatre in 1991.)
