= Maria Sardiñas =

Maria Sardiñas (August 9, 1925 in Matanzas, Cuba – April 1, 2018) was an Emeritus Professor at the San Diego State University School of Social Work.

== Biography ==
Sardiñas received her undergraduate education in chemistry and medical social work at the University of Havana. Her Master of Social Work was awarded in 1957 from the Columbia University School of Social Work. Her thesis was titled The Mexican Immigrant: Implications for Social Services was considered “a seminal piece at the time as there was no literature in this area.”

The California Social Work Hall of Distinction says Her University of Havana Chemistry Degree was a MS degree awarded in 1945 and her medical social work degree was also a MS and awarded in 1955.

== Career ==
She went to work in San Diego in the 1960s as one of the small number of bilingual workers for the State of California Mental Health Department. Maria went on to become a field instructor for the SDSU School of Social Work where one of her students was Mateo Camarillo. He ended up founding the San Ysidro Health Clinic.

she worked at the School of Social Work from 1968 until her retirement in 1989. A national advocate for people with mental illness, she developed a course called Psycho-Social Rehabilitation for the Chronically Mentally Ill which was the first course of its kind at a social work school in California.

Maria was one of the founders of Trabajadores de la Raza.

== Legacy ==
Maria was acknowledged by the California Social Work Hall of Distinction in 2008. The Maria Sardiñas Wellness Recovery Center located in San Ysidro was named in her honor.

The National Association of Social Workers and the International Association of Psychosocial Rehabilitative Services honored her with Lifetime Achievement awards.
