= Ray C. De Yoe =

American politician from California

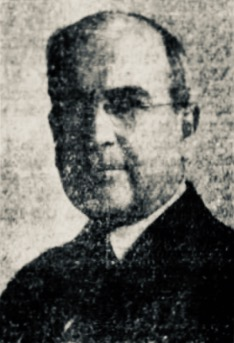
- Ray C. De Yoe (1930)

Member of the California State Assembly from the 48th district
- In office January 7, 1929 - January 5, 1931
- Preceded by: Ellis Walton Hedges Jr.
- Succeeded by: Robert Lincoln Patterson

Personal details
- Born: April 17, 1876 Alamo Township, Michigan
- Died: September 25, 1933 (aged 57) Carmel-by-the-Sea, California
- Party: Republican
- Spouse: Maud May
- Children: 1

Military service
- Branch/service: United States Army
- Battles/wars: Spanish–American War

Ray Congdon De Yoe (April 17, 1876 - September 25, 1933), also known as Ray C. De Yoe served in the California State Assembly for the 48th district from 1929 to 1931. He was president of the Carmel Realty Company and had real estate holdings in Monterey County, California, including the De Yoe Building in Carmel built by Michael J. Murphy.

== Early life ==
De Yoe was born in Alamo Township, Michigan, on April 17, 1876, to Anson Serinar Deyoe (1845–1906) and Rosette J. Congdon (1854–1908). In 1879, his parents moved to San Luis Obispo county. De Yoe served in the Spanish–American War.

At age 42, during World War I, De Yoe registered for the draft at the local board for Monterey County.

== Career ==
=== Political life ===
On November 7, 1928, De Yoe won the election in the California State Assembly for the California's 48th State Assembly district. He served from 1929 to 1931. In April 1929, DeYoe introduced legislature for a bill that he and Carmel city attorney Argyll Campbell drew up, to allow the formation of public airport districts for Monterey, Pacific Grove, and Carmel. De Yoe was a member of the Livestock and Dairy Committee and helped pass the law which gave dairymen payment by the state for cattle condemned and slaughtered because of tuberculosis.

De Yoe ran again for the Assembly in November 1930, against Chris N. Jespersen for the California's 43rd State Assembly district of Monterey and San Luis Obispo County. His campaign was backed by Carmel Martin, Monterey attorney, and a large group of Monterey County citizens. He lost to Jespersen, who received the majority of the votes.

== Death ==
De Yoe died on September 25, 1933, in Carmel, at age 57, from an infection that started when he scratched his finger on a rose bush.
