= Roderick Wright (politician) =

American politician (born 1952)

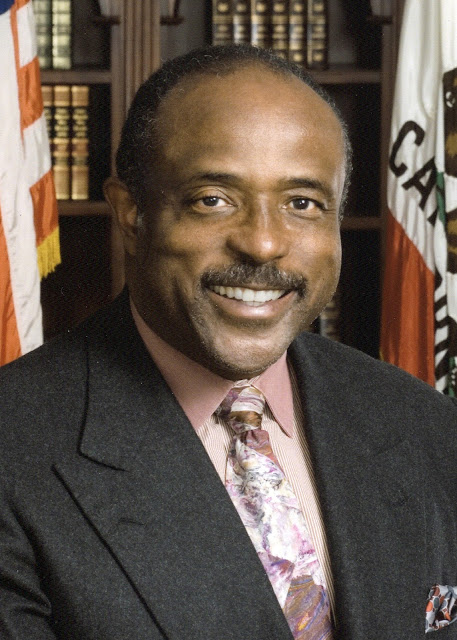

Member of the California State Senate
- In office December 1, 2008 – September 22, 2014
- Preceded by: Edward Vincent
- Succeeded by: Isadore Hall III
- Constituency: 25th district (2008–12); 35th district (2012–14)

Member of the California State Assembly from the 48th district
- In office December 2, 1996 – November 30, 2002
- Preceded by: Marguerite Archie-Hudson
- Succeeded by: Mark Ridley-Thomas

Personal details
- Born: Roderick Devon Wright; July 3, 1952 (age 74) Chicago, Illinois, U.S.
- Party: Democratic
- Children: 2
- Education: Pepperdine University
- Occupation: Legislator

Roderick Devon "Rod" Wright (born July 3, 1952) is an American Democratic politician who previously represented California's 35th State Senate district until his resignation on September 22, 2014. He previously represented the 25th district from 2008-2012. Wright also represented California's 48th State Assembly district from 1996 until he was term limited in 2002.

== Education and pre-legislative career ==
Senator Wright obtained his degree in Urban Studies and City Planning at Pepperdine University.

Prior to his initial entrance into elected office in 1996, Senator Wright was the District Director to Congresswoman Maxine Waters where he assisted citizens with federal matters such as Social Security, Medi-Care and veterans issues among others.

== Legislative career ==
Wright was then elected to the California State Assembly in 1996 representing the 48th Assembly District covering much of south Los Angeles County. From 1998 until 2002, Wright served as Chair of the Assembly Committee on Utilities and Commerce (U&C) which held legislative jurisdiction over electricity, natural gas, telecommunications, private water corporations and other issues related to commerce. Wright has been recognized for his work in the areas of public safety, education, energy and utilities, small business, family law and consumer privacy.

=== 2008 primary ===
Entering the 2008 primary season, Wright had been out of politics for six years and was initially not considered a strong candidate against the front runner, former Lieutenant Governor and Congressman Mervyn Dymally. However, with his own fundraising and help from independent expenditure groups, Wright was able to overcome his lack of name recognition in the area – most of the area Wright represented in the California State Assembly is in California's 26th Senate District.

=== 2010 harassment settlement ===
In April 2010, California Senate leaders secretly approved a $120,000 settlement in a harassment claim against Wright.

=== 2010 indictment and 2014 conviction ===
In September 2010, a Los Angeles County grand jury unsealed an eight-count felony indictment against Wright accusing him of filing a false declaration of candidacy, voter fraud and perjury beginning in 2007, when he changed his voter registration to run for the legislature.

Wright was convicted of eight counts of voter fraud on January 28, 2014. In September, he was sentenced to ninety days' confinement and banned from public office for the rest of his life.

Wright resigned from the State Senate on September 22, 2014.

=== Pardon ===
On November 21, 2018, Jerry Brown, Governor of California, pardoned Wright.

California Assembly
Preceded by Marguerite Archie-Hudson	Member of the California State Assembly from the 48th district December 2, 1996–December 2, 2002	Succeeded by Mark Ridley-Thomas
California Senate
Preceded by Edward Vincent	Member of the California State Senate from the 25th district December 1, 2008–December 3, 2012	Succeeded by Carol Liu
Preceded by Tom Harman	Member of the California State Senate from the 35th district December 3, 2012–September 22, 2014	Succeeded by Isadore Hall III
