= Blanca Rubio =

American politician (born 1969)

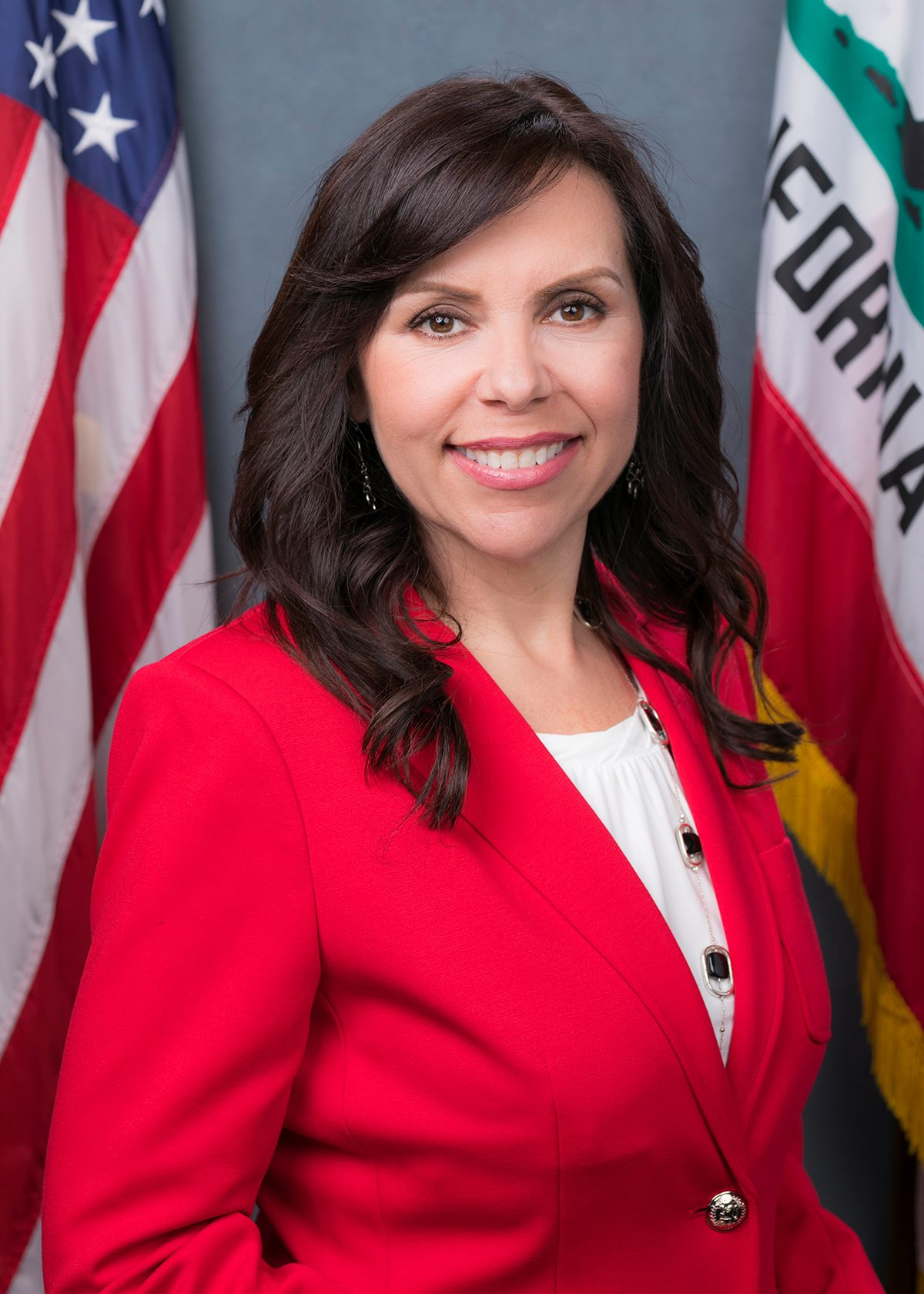
- Official portrait, 2016

Member of the California State Assembly from the 48th district
- Incumbent
- Assumed office December 5, 2016
- Preceded by: Roger Hernández

Personal details
- Born: Blanca Estela Rubio; September 15, 1969 (age 56) Ciudad Juárez, Mexico
- Party: Democratic
- Education: East Los Angeles College 1995-1998 Azusa Pacific University Azusa Pacific University BA Business (1998-1999) BA & Azusa Pacific University MA Education with Teaching Credential (2001-2003) MA
- Website: State Assembly website

Blanca Estela Rubio (born September 15, 1969) is an American politician serving in the California State Assembly since 2016. She is a Democrat representing the 48th Assembly District, encompassing parts of the eastern San Gabriel Valley, including Baldwin Park, Covina, and Glendora. Prior to being elected to the State Assembly, she was a board trustee for the Baldwin Park Unified School District, and a schoolteacher for 16 years. Rubio is a board member of the Chamber of Progress, a tech industry trade group.

== Early life and education ==
Blanca Rubio was born in Ciudad Juárez, Mexico, and first came to the United States with family to Winnie, Texas, where she lived as an illegal immigrant. She was deported back to Juárez, returned to Los Angeles illegally in 1977 with her family, and eventually became a citizen in 1994. Her younger sister, Susan Rubio, is a member of the California State Senate.

Assemblywoman Blanca Rubio received her bachelor's degree in Business Administration and master's degree in Education with a Multiple Subject Teaching Credential from Azusa Pacific University. Rubio taught elementary school in Fontana Unified School District. In 2003, she was elected to Baldwin Park Unified School District Board of Education. She served for two terms as both President and Vice President.

== California State Assembly ==
Assemblywoman Blanca Rubio is the Chair of Governmental Organization. The first Latina to ever serve as Chair of this Committee. She is also on the following Standing Committees, Banking and Finance, Insurance, Aging and Long-Term Care and Joint legislative Audit Committee. She serves as the Chair of the Select Committee on Domestic Violence. A subject that she is passionate about. Assemblywoman Rubio has authored and co-authored numerous bills that support victims of domestic violence, create opportunities for children within the foster care system to ensure students are given proper support to attend in school, and support for immigrant communities. She co-sponsored SB 273 with her sister Susan Rubio, which would extend the statute of limitations for victims of domestic violence to 10 years from 3 years in certain cases, and require more training for police dealing with abuse victims.

== Electoral history ==
2016 California State Assembly 48th district election
Primary election
Party	Candidate	Votes	%
Republican	Cory Ellenson	18,547	26.4
Democratic	Blanca Rubio	17,941	25.5
Democratic	Bryan Urias	16,178	23.0
Democratic	Manuel Lozano	11,510	16.4
Democratic	Armando Barajas	6,129	8.7
Total votes		70,305	100.0
General election
Democratic	Blanca Rubio	87,321	64.1
Republican	Cory Ellenson	48,922	35.9
Total votes		136,243	100.0
Democratic hold			

2018 California State Assembly 48th district election
Primary election
Party	Candidate	Votes	%
Democratic	Blanca Rubio (incumbent)	33,144	100.0
Total votes		33,144	100.0
General election
Democratic	Blanca Rubio (incumbent)	90,105	100.0
Total votes		90,105	100.0
Democratic hold			

2020 California State Assembly 48th district election
Primary election
Party	Candidate	Votes	%
Democratic	Blanca Rubio (incumbent)	58,432	100.0
Total votes		58,432	100.0
General election
Democratic	Blanca Rubio (incumbent)	126,430	100.0
Total votes		126,430	100.0
Democratic hold			

2022 California State Assembly 48th district election
Primary election
Party	Candidate	Votes	%
Democratic	Blanca Rubio (incumbent)	38,026	97.1
Republican	Ryan Maye (write-in)	1,138	2.9
Total votes		39,164	100.0
General election
Democratic	Blanca Rubio (incumbent)	60,770	60.8
Republican	Ryan Maye	39,110	39.2
Total votes		99,880	100.0
Democratic hold			

2024 California State Assembly 48th district election
Primary election
Party	Candidate	Votes	%
Democratic	Blanca Rubio (incumbent)	27,471	41.4
Republican	Dan Tran	26,226	39.5
Democratic	Brian Calderón Tabatabai	12,712	19.1
Total votes		66,409	100.0
General election
Democratic	Blanca Rubio (incumbent)	101,637	61.8
Republican	Dan Tran	62,880	38.2
Total votes		164,517	100.0
Democratic hold			
