= Marguerite Archie-Hudson =

American politician

Member of the California State Assembly from the 48th district
- In office December 3, 1990 – November 30, 1996
- Preceded by: Maxine Waters
- Succeeded by: Roderick Wright

17th President of Talladega College
- In office 1998–2001
- Succeeded by: Henry Ponder

Personal details
- Born: Marguerite Archie; November 18, 1937 (age 88) Yonges Island, South Carolina, U.S.
- Party: Democratic
- Education: Talladega College, Harvard University, University of California, Los Angeles

Marguerite Archie-Hudson (born November 18, 1937) is an American politician, and academic administrator. She served as a democrat in the California State Assembly from the 48th district, from 1990 to 1996. She also served as the president of her alma mater, Talladega College from 1998 until 2001, and she became the first woman president of the college and the first African-American woman to head a four-year college level institution in the history of the state of Alabama.

== Biography ==
She attended Talladega College (BA degree 1958) and studied psychology; Harvard University (MA degree 1962) in education and counseling; and received a PhD from the University of California, Los Angeles (UCLA).

She served in the California State Assembly from 1990 until she was termed out in 1996. During that time she was a member of the California Legislative Black Caucus.

From 1998 to 2001, Archie-Hudson served as president of her alma mater, Talladega College, in Talladega, Alabama. She was the first female president of Talladega College in the schools history; and was the first African-American woman to head a four-year college level institution in the history of the state of Alabama. During her time as president she increased student enrollment and reduced the college debt, but her contract was not renewed in 2001. She was succeeded by Henry Ponder as interim president.
