= William J. Martin =

American businessman and politician (1861–1941)

Member of the California State Assembly from the 48th district
- In office January 8, 1917 – January 3, 1921
- Preceded by: Arthur Elliott Boyce
- Succeeded by: Daniel McCloskey

Postmaster of Salinas
- In office May 10, 1920 – June 30, 1933
- Nominated by: Woodrow Wilson
- Preceded by: Clarence Tynan
- Succeeded by: John Iverson

Personal details
- Born: William Jefferson Martin; September 28, 1861 Monterey, California, U.S.
- Died: June 30, 1941 (aged 79) Salinas, California, U.S.
- Party: Republican
- Spouses: Mollie Hamilton (died 1915) Bertha Marten (died 1936)
- Children: 2

William Jefferson Martin (September 28, 1861 – June 30, 1941) was an American businessman and politician. A member of the Republican Party, he served in the California State Assembly from the 48th district between 1917 and 1921. He also served as the postmaster of Salinas, California, between 1920 and 1933.

== Life and career ==
William Jefferson Martin was born on September 28, 1861, in Monterey, California. He was the second of six children born to Daniel C. Martin, a Great Plains native who moved to California during the Gold Rush, and Jane Nestor, an Irishwoman. Martin became employed at the Western Union Telegraph Company at the age of 14. He served as the company's manager until he retired to become the business manager of The Morning Call in 1898.

Martin first married Mollie Hamilton. Hamilton was the sister of Olive Steinbeck, the mother of American author John Steinbeck. She died in 1915. Martin's second and last marriage was to Bertha Marten. They had two children together, William and Mildred; the former was born on September 5, 1921, in Salinas. Marten died in 1936.

For the 1916 election for California's 48th State Assembly district, Martin received the nominations of the Republican, Democratic, and Progressive parties. In response, Martin stated that although he did not wish to hold office, he would "do [his] best to get elected." Martin was unopposed in the general election. He was re-elected in 1918 and ran unopposed in both elections.

On one of his first days in office, Martin introduced two bills, one that would adopt mandatory military training in California and another that would require the flag of the United States to fly over school buildings in California. In 1919, Martin introduced resolutions urging the United States government to support an establishment of the League of Nations. Later during the year, a bill of his that would extend the boundaries of Monterey was signed into law by governor William Stephens.

While serving in the Assembly, Martin was nominated by Woodrow Wilson to become the postmaster of Salinas, California. At the request of James Farley, the United States Postmaster General, Martin resigned in 1933.

On June 30, 1941, Martin died at his home in Salinas. His funeral was held three days later on July 3.
