= T. Fenton Knight =

American politician

Member of the California State Assembly from the 48th district
- In office January 2, 1939 - January 3, 1949
- Preceded by: Frank G. Martin
- Succeeded by: Bruce V. Reagan

Personal details
- Born: April 23, 1882 Alanthus Grove, Missouri
- Died: July 7, 1954 (aged 72)
- Party: Republican
- Spouse: Julia Murray Knight
- Children: 2

Military service
- Branch/service: United States Army
- Battles/wars: World War I

Thomas Fenton Knight (April 23, 1882 – July 7, 1954) was an American politician who served in the California legislature as representative of California's 48th State Assembly district from 1939 to 1949. During World War I, he served in the United States Army.
