= Bruce V. Reagan =

American politician (1902–1978)

Member of the California State Assembly from the 47th district
- In office January 5, 1959 – January 7, 1963
- Preceded by: Albert I. Stewart
- Succeeded by: Frank D. Lanterman

Member of the California State Assembly from the 48th district
- In office January 3, 1949 – January 8, 1951
- Preceded by: T. Fenton Knight
- Succeeded by: Frank D. Lanterman

Personal details
- Born: July 5, 1902 Winnebago, Minnesota, U.S.
- Died: April 9, 1978 (aged 75) Pasadena, California, U.S.
- Party: Republican
- Spouse: Muriel Benton
- Children: Bruce V. Reagan Jr.

Military service
- Allegiance: United States
- Branch/service: United States Army
- Battles/wars: World War II

Bruce Vincent Reagan (July 5, 1902 – April 9, 1978) was an American politician who served in the California State Legislature. During World War II he served in the United States Army, being on staff for General Dwight D. Eisenhower. He was born on July 5, 1902, in Winnebago, Minnesota. He attended Shattuck Military Academy and Yale University where he took government and economics classes. He moved to Pasadena, California and worked at what became Merrill Lynch, Fenner & Beane of Pasadena. He became a member of the Pasadena Republican Club. In 1948 he ran for the Legislature of the State of California and won. He served in the 48th Assembly district from 1949 to 1951 and again in the 47th Assembly district from 1959 to 1963. He was member of the Pasadena Kiwanis, Pasadena Chamber of Commerce and the Pasadena Tournament of Roses. Bruce's wife was Muriel and his son was Bruce II. He died on April 9, 1978, in Pasadena.

Reagan, who was no relation to Ronald Reagan, was the Republican nominee for California State Controller in 1962, but was defeated by the incumbent, Democrat Alan Cranston.
