= Center for Advanced Study in Theoretical Linguistics =

Research center in Tromsø, Norway

The Center for Advanced Study in Theoretical Linguistics (CASTL) was established in 2002 as a Center of Excellence by the Norwegian Research Council. It is located in Tromsø, Norway, and is housed at the University of Tromsø. CASTL was founded by a core group of internationally respected linguists in Tromsø, and the funding made available by the Norwegian Research Council has since enabled the Center to more than double its staff size.

== Objectives ==
The center's objective is to explore the limits and nature of linguistic variation, focusing mainly on syntax and phonology but also branching into morphology and semantics. All natural languages are of relevance to this study. The center has been exploring a methodology which can be referred to as "Selective Global Comparison," an approach in which a relatively small number of unrelated languages are examined in depth in order to determine the nature of the variation which distinguishes them. This methodology is distinct from usual work in linguistic typology, which tends to compare many languages at a relatively superficial level of description, and from microcomparative studies, which tend to compare closely related languages at a level of great detail.

== Organizational structure ==
At any given time there are about twenty to twenty-five doctorate holding linguists working on CASTL-related projects in Tromsø. There are also twelve to fifteen PhD students and some number of Master's students. In addition, CASTL is the center of a broad international network of current linguistic research, for example as the administrative host of the NORMS project (a Nordic Center of Excellence in Microcomparative Scandinavian Syntax) and the EGG school and other international ventures. It is therefore one of the largest centers dedicated to theoretical linguistic research in the world.

== Recent Research ==
Recent research at CASTL has focused on (among other things) the nature of grammatical linguistic categories and their relationship to functional structure, the structure of inventories of phonological segments, and the nature of verb movement.
