= Lanterman House =

Historic house in California, United States

- U.S. National Register of Historic Places
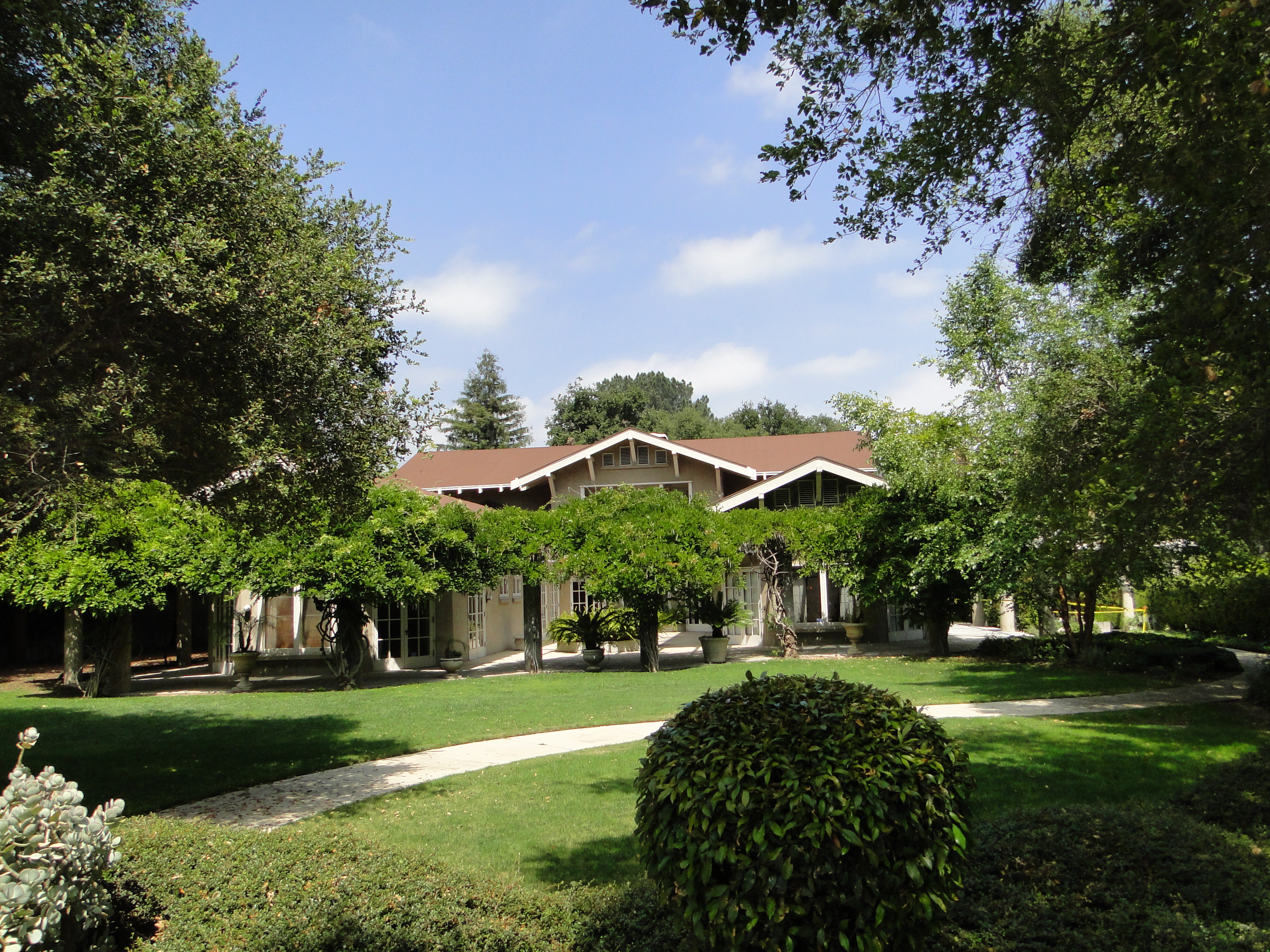
- Lanterman House

- Location within the Los Angeles metropolitan area Location within California Location within the United States
- Location: 4420 Encinas Dr., Tract #41,508, La Cañada Flintridge, California
- Coordinates: 34°12′16″N 118°12′20″W
- Area: 1.4 acres (0.57 ha)
- Built: 1915
- Built by: Arthur L. Haley
- Architectural style: Bungalow/American craftsman
- NRHP reference No.: 94001504
- Added to NRHP: December 29, 1994

Lanterman House is a bungalow-style historic house museum in La Cañada Flintridge, California on the National Register of Historic Places. The house was commissioned by Dr. Roy Lanterman in 1915 and was built by A. L. Haley (b. 1865), who was a prominent builder of both residences and commercial buildings in the Los Angeles area.

Lanterman, who had treated victims of the 1906 San Francisco earthquake and fire, insisted that the foundation, floors and walls of his house be built from reinforced concrete, and Haley interpreted the aesthetics of Craftsman-style wood-built bungalows in the new material. The house retains much of its original furniture and finishes, including a grand ballroom that occupies the entire second floor, and Dr. Lanterman's consulting rooms in the basement.

The property was opened as a museum in 1993 and is managed by the Lanterman Historical Museum Foundation. It was placed on the National Register of Historic Places in 1994. It is home to the Lanterman House Archives, which contains family materials as well as documents and photographs from the defunct La Cañada Flintridge Historical Society.

The Lanterman House is open for tours most Tuesday and Thursday afternoons by reservation at 1:00 pm and 2:30 pm. The Lanterman House History Center and Archive is available for public research by appointment. It is recommended that you call before visiting. They are closed for all major holidays and for the month of August.

== Gallery ==
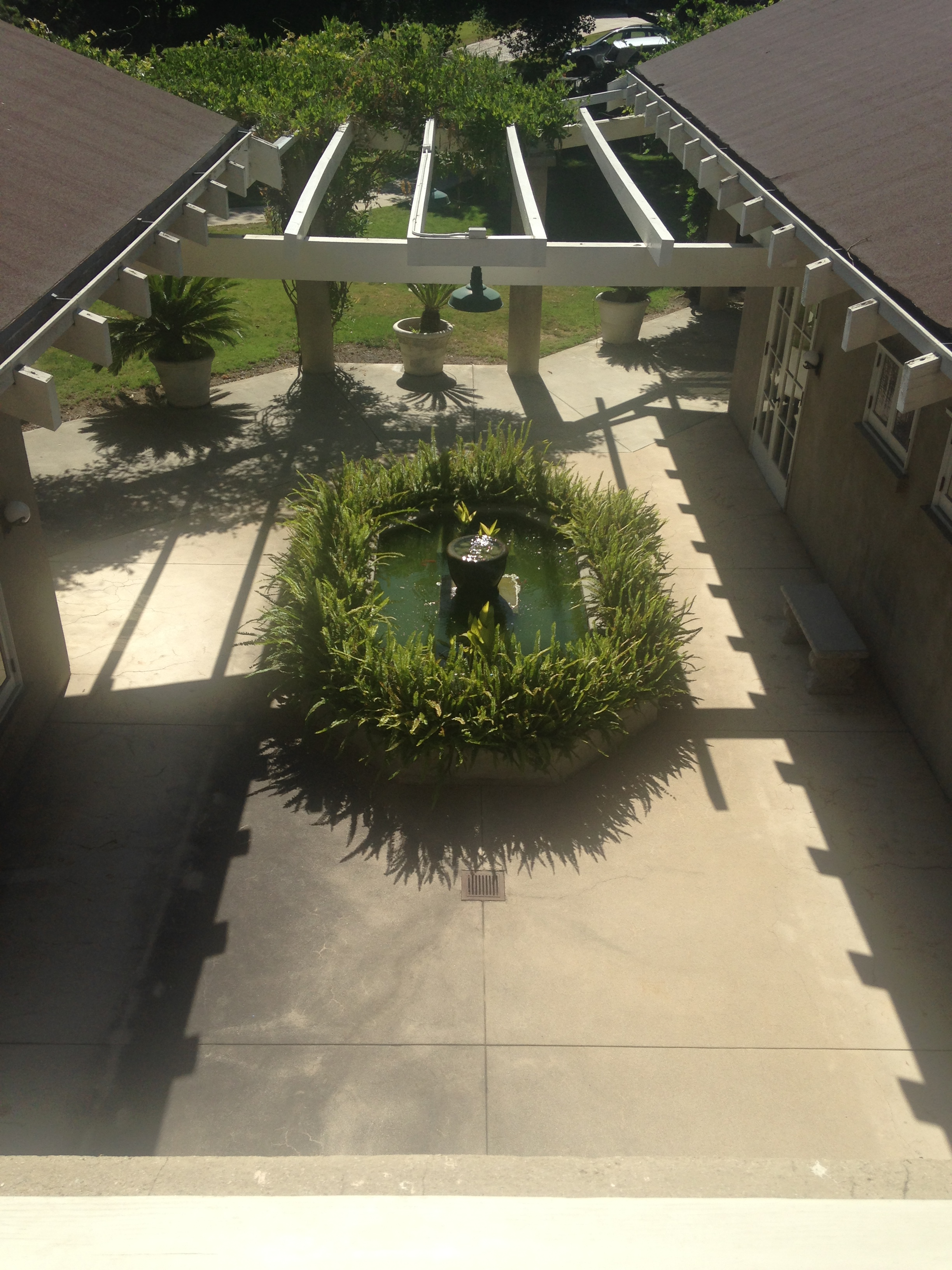
Lanterman courtyard

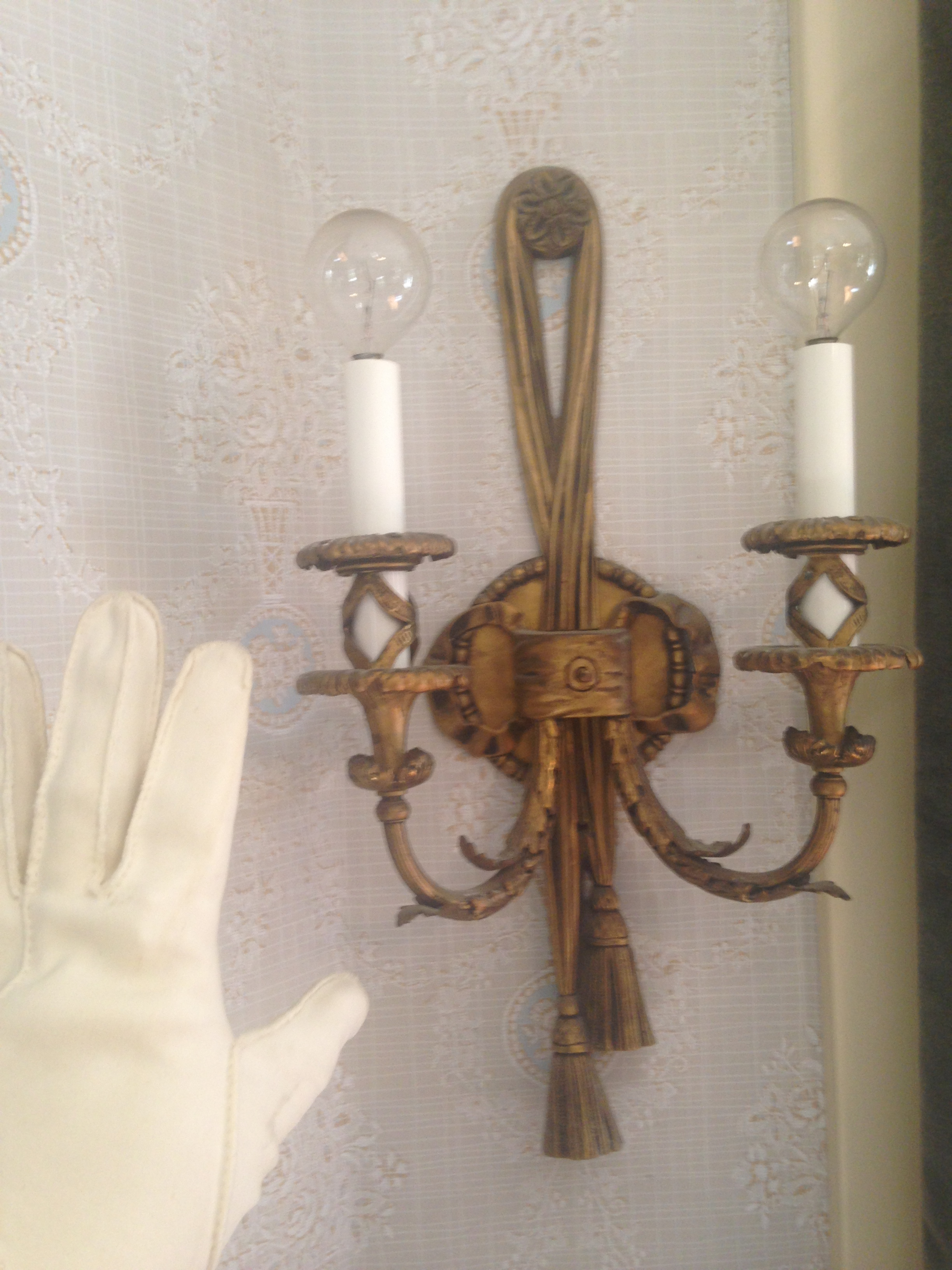
One of the vintage light fixtures

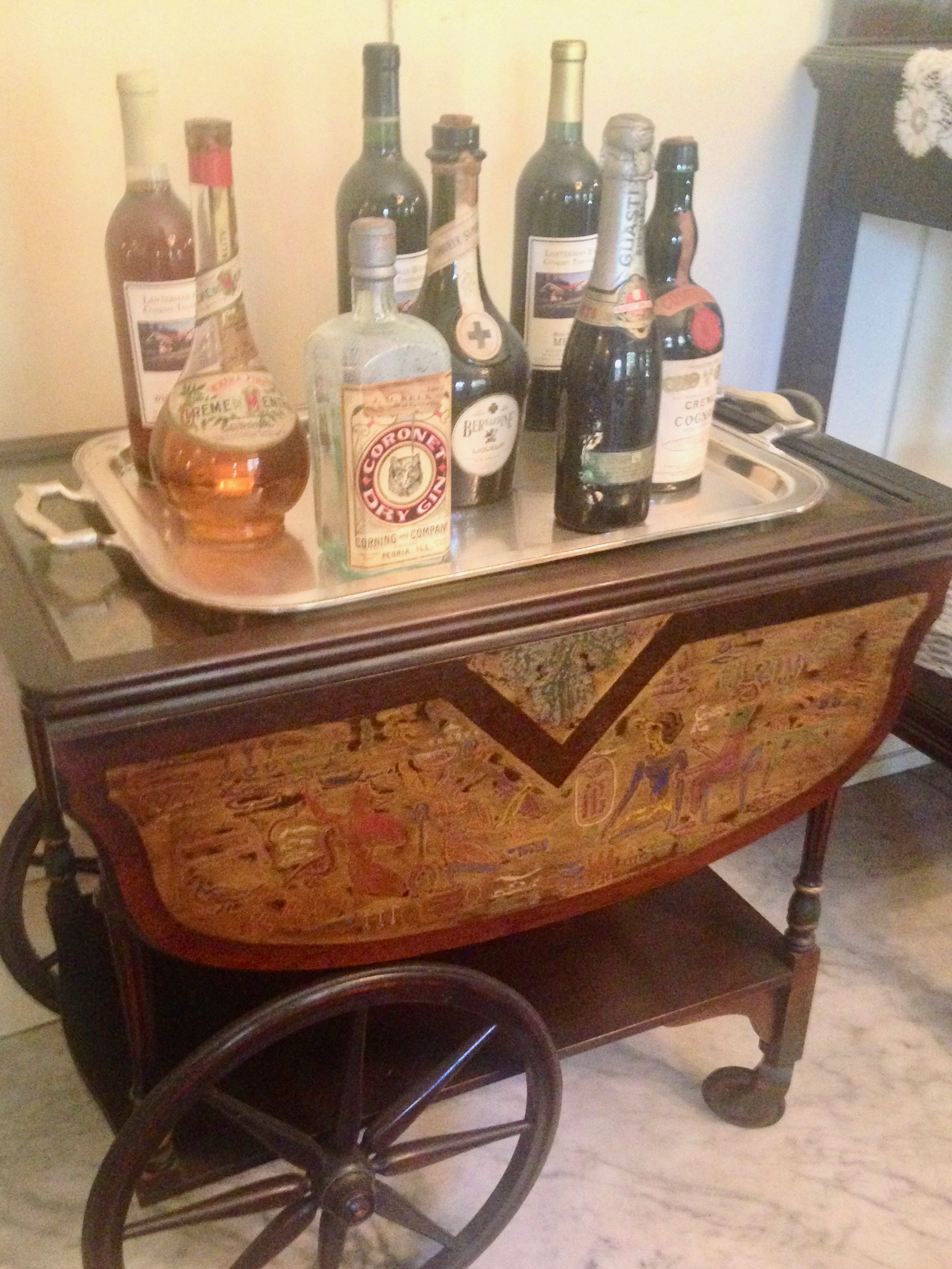
Vintage tea service cart

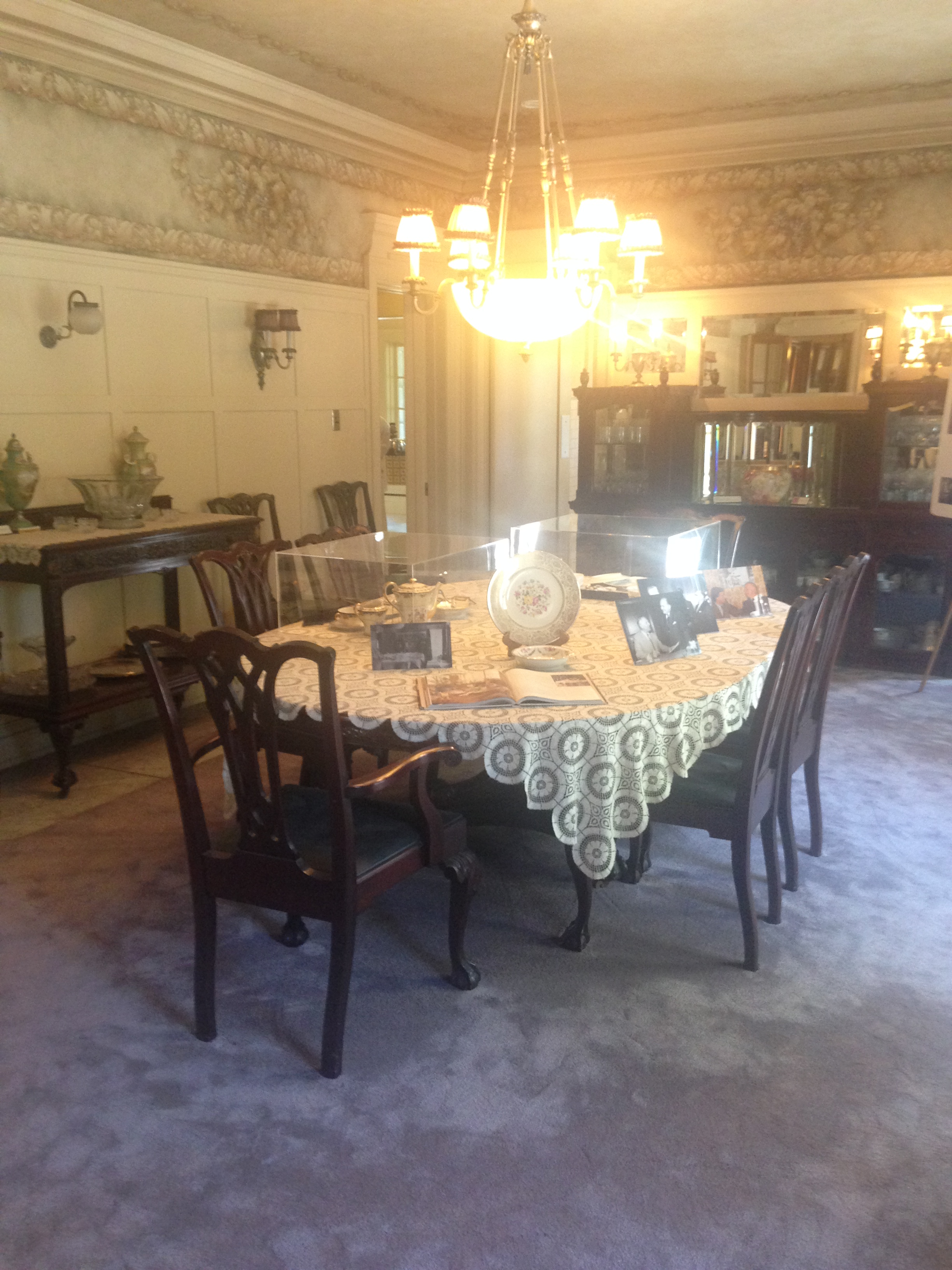
Lanterman dining room

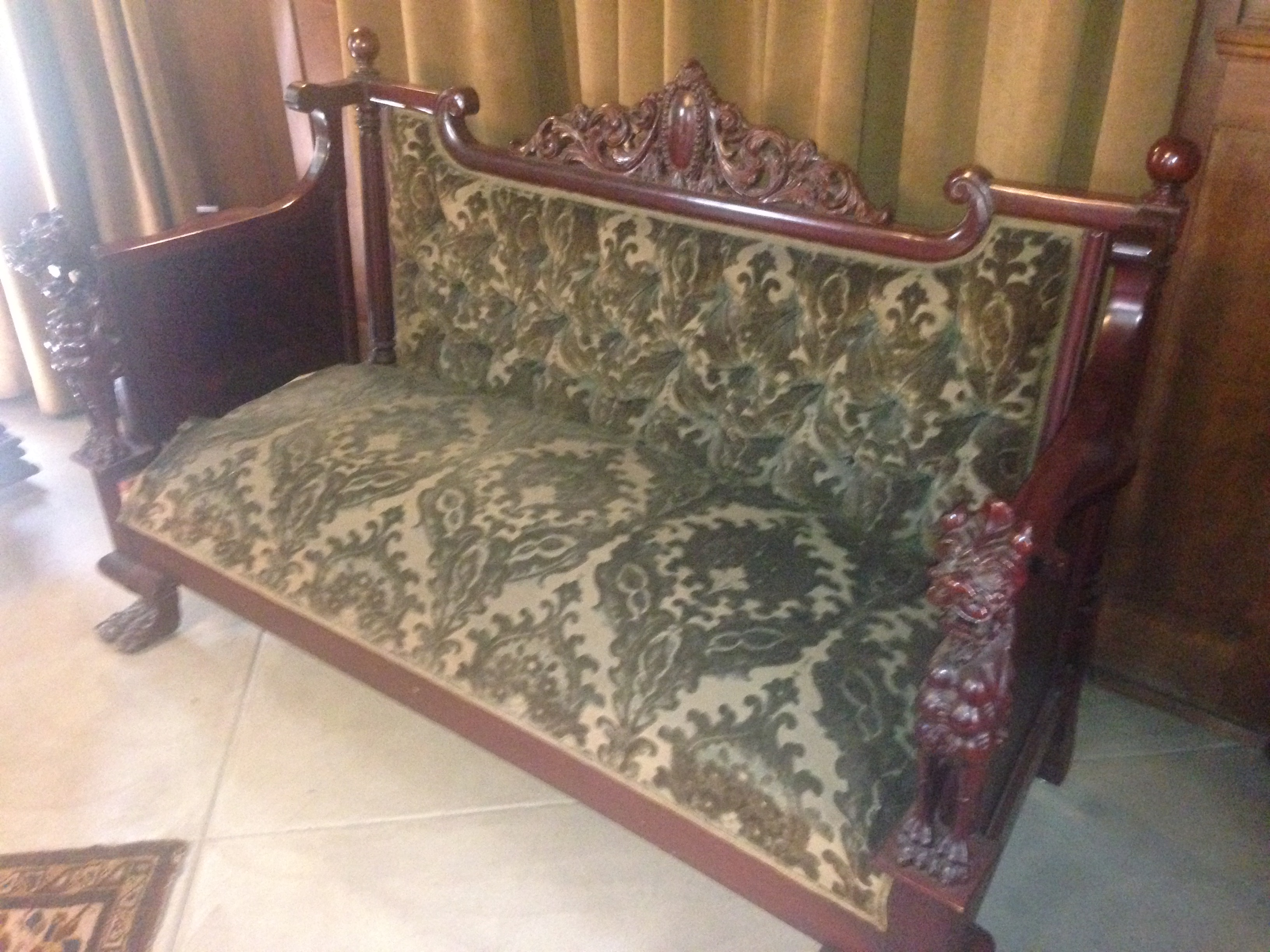
A settee

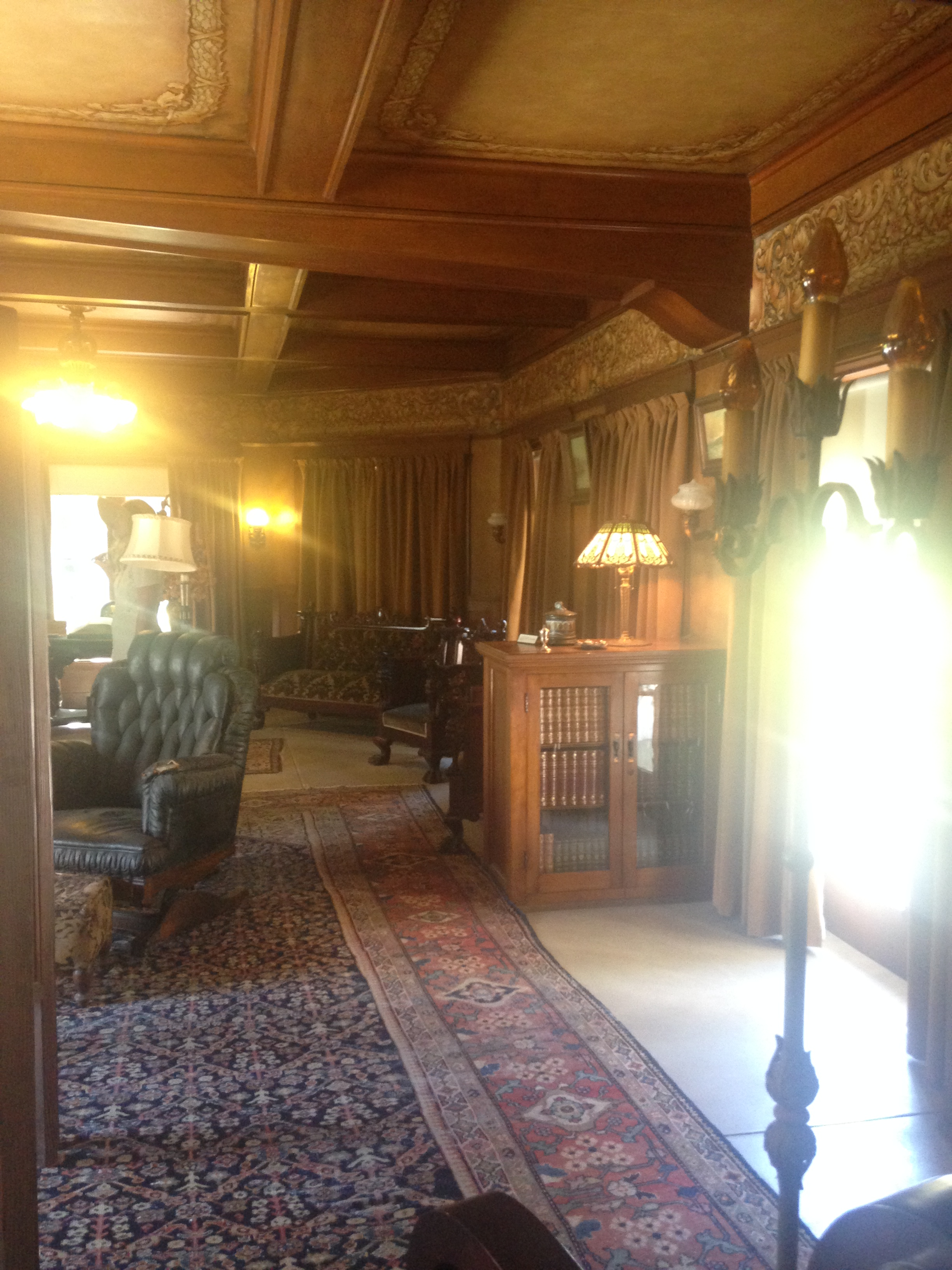
Living room

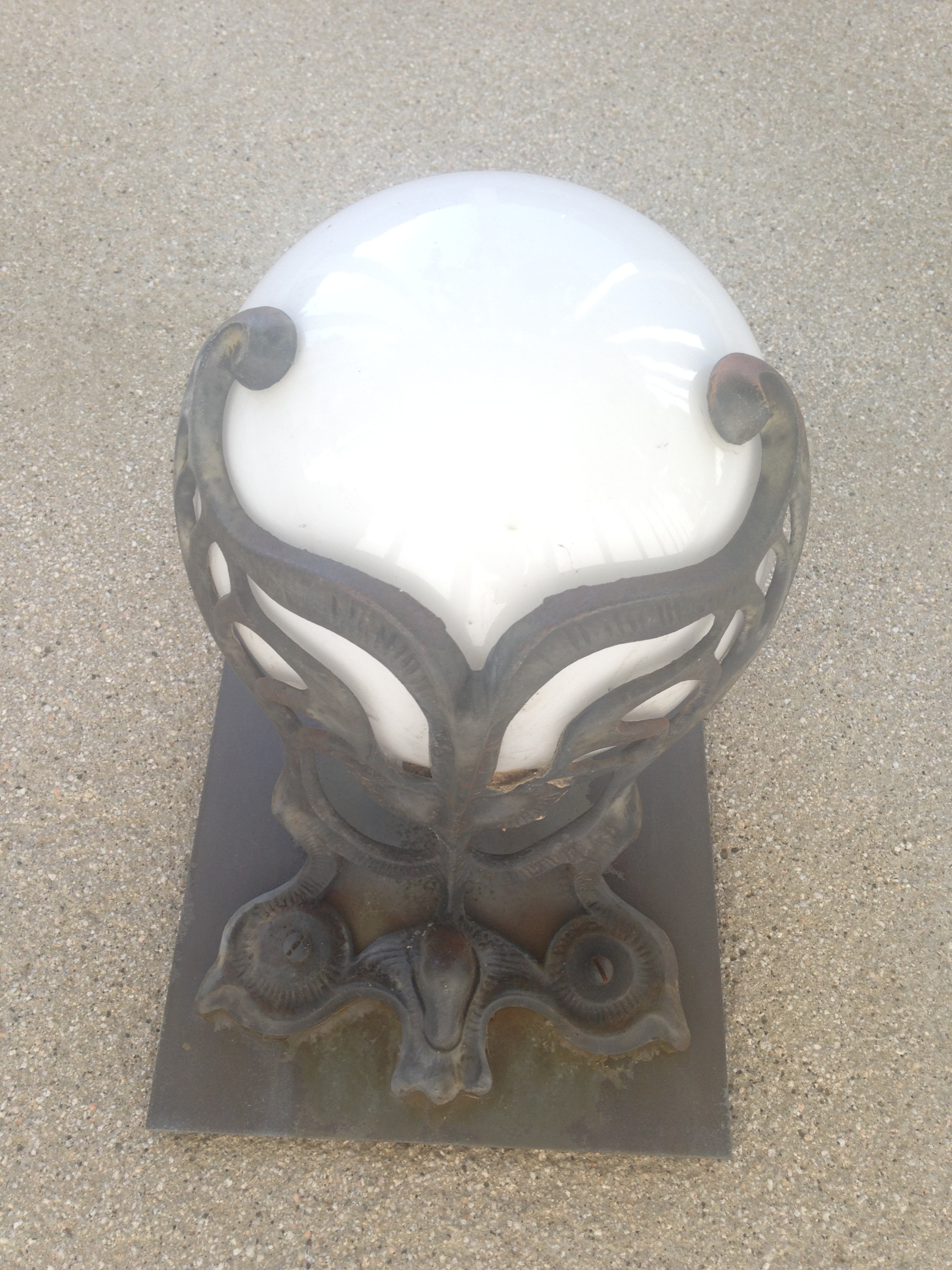
A sconce outside the house

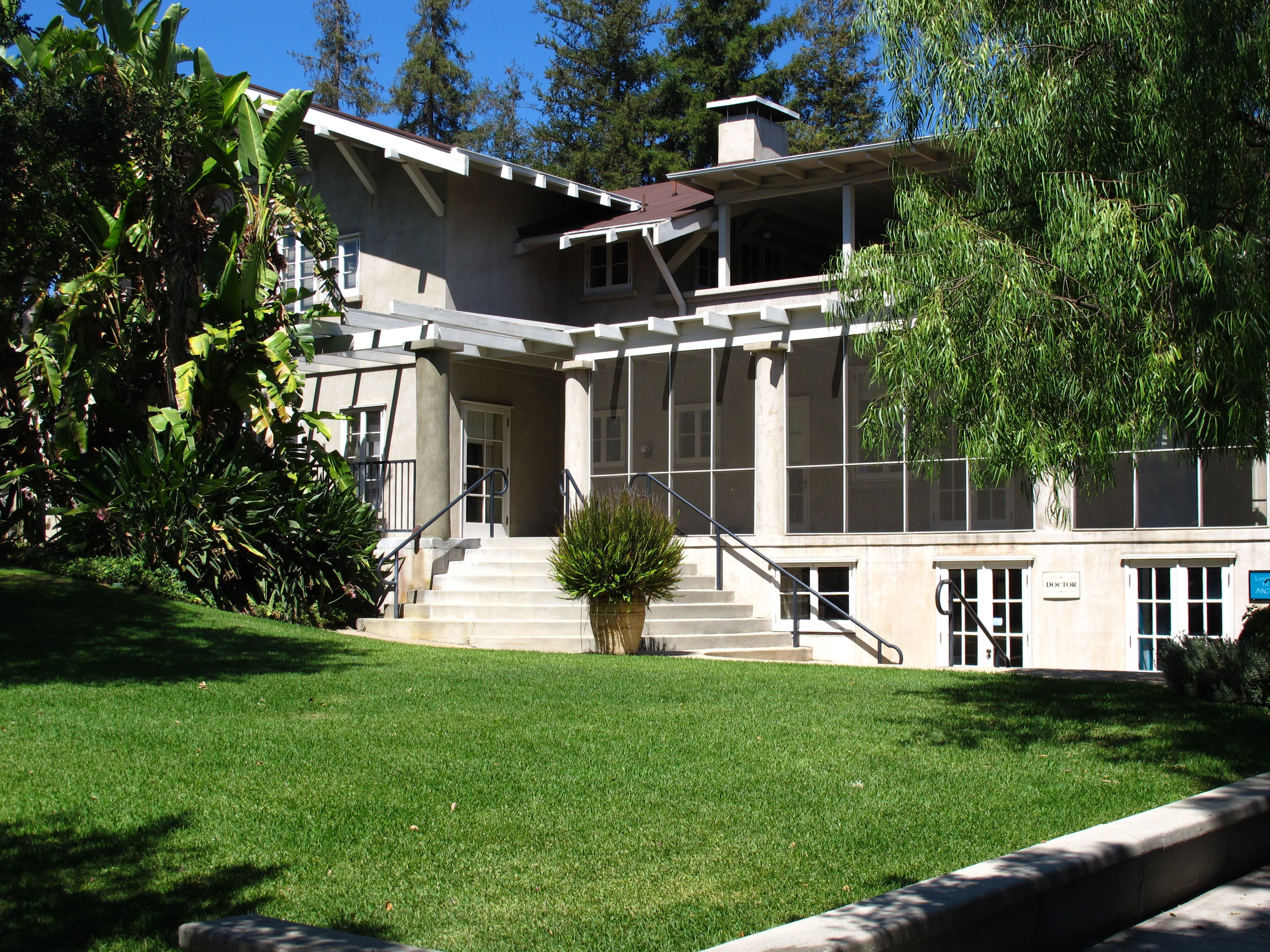
Roof massing and supports

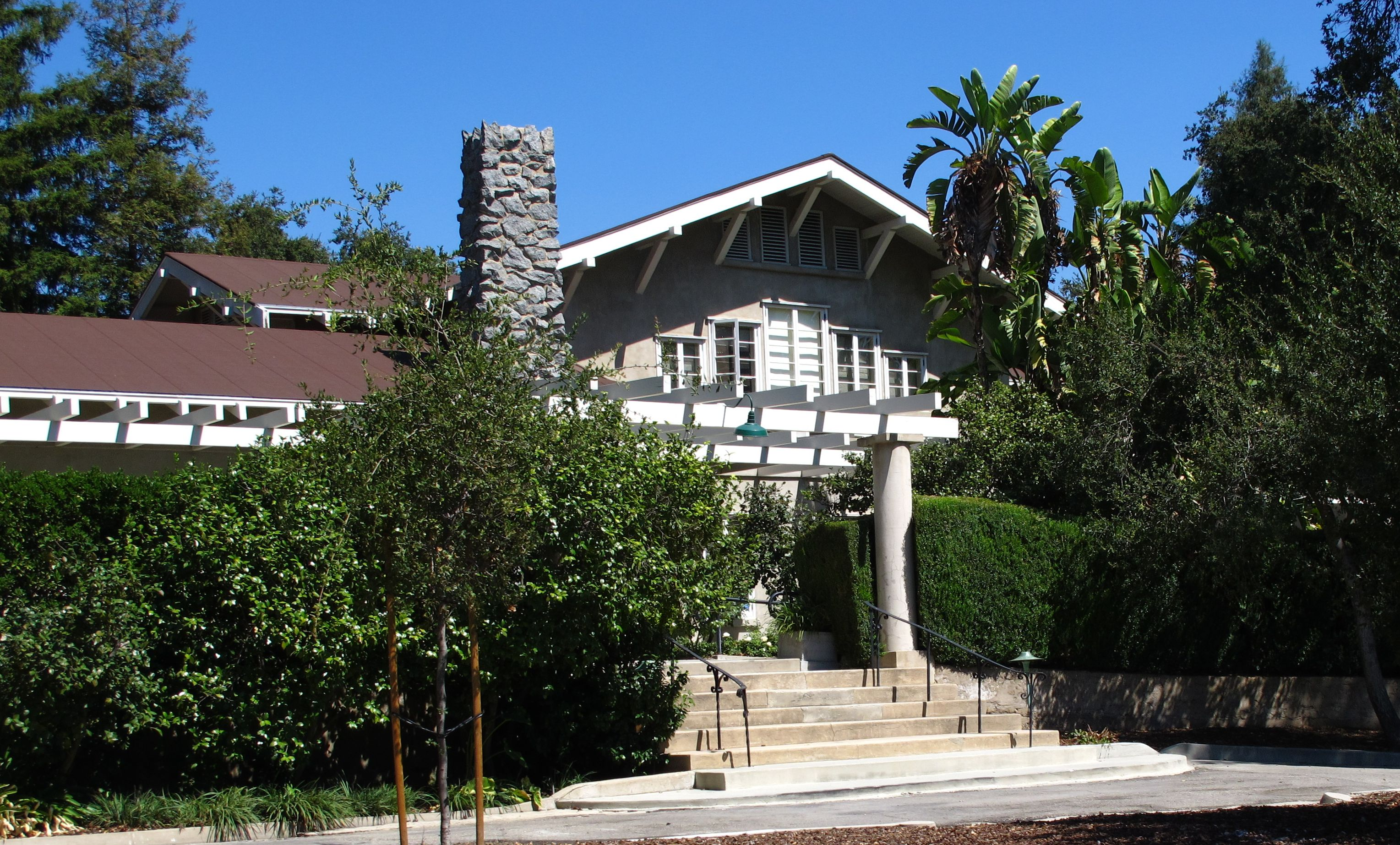
Porch entry

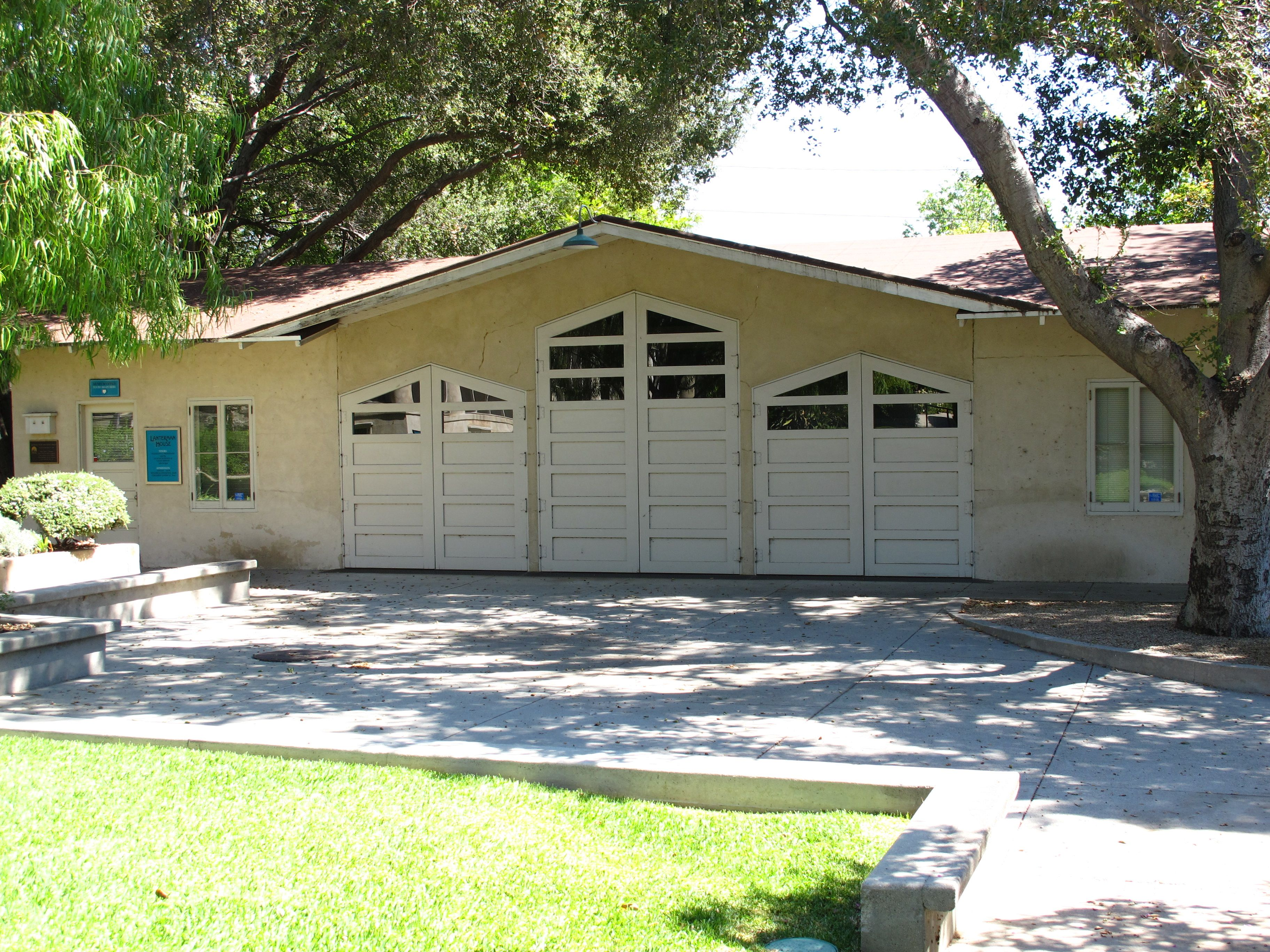
Original garage, now the Visitor Center

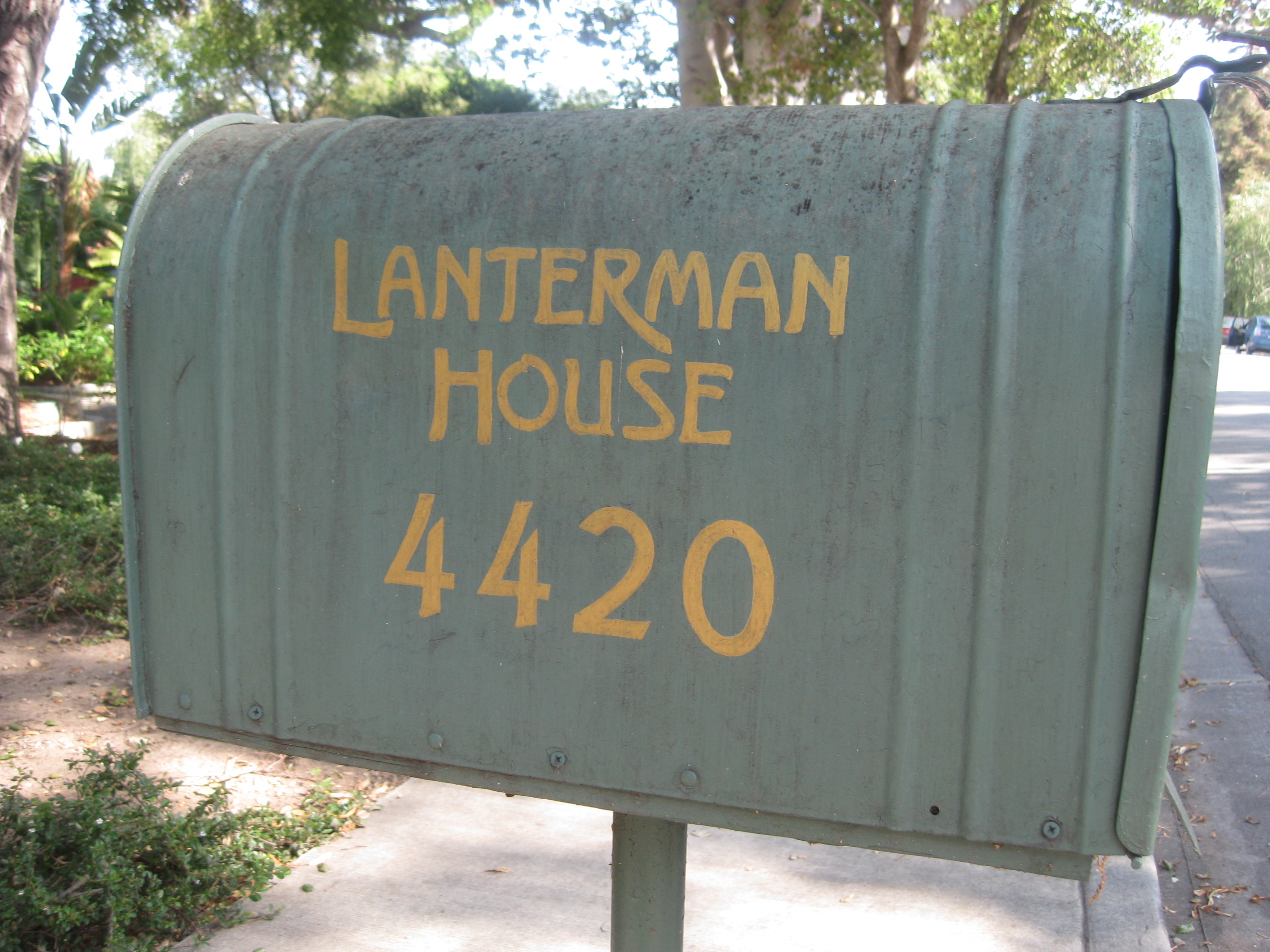
