= Center for Advanced Studies and the Arts =

School in Oak Park, Michigan, United States

Coordinates: 42.4655°N 83.1632°W

CASA (Center for Advanced Studies and the Arts) is a public consortium high school in Oak Park, Michigan offering students from surrounding schools afternoon classes in Advanced Placement (A.P.) classes; art, dance and music courses; and courses that might not have enough demand at a single high school (such as Japanese). Students are bussed to CASA from their "home schools" for two 55-minute class periods per day.

The participating schools are Berkley, Clawson, Hazel Park, Ferndale, Lamphere, Madison, Oak Park High Schools, Pontiac High School and International Technology Academy.
