= California's 48th State Assembly district =

American legislative district

Current assemblymember
Blanca Rubio; D–Baldwin Park
- Population (2010) • Voting age • Citizen voting age: 461,346; 337,378; 255,184
- Demographics: 19.40% White; 2.66% Black; 64.04% Latino; 12.86% Asian; 0.35% Native American; 0.14% Hawaiian/Pacific Islander; 0.20% other; 0.36% remainder of multiracial
- Registered voters: 222,223
- Registration: 47.25% Democratic; 22.97% Republican; 24.85% No party preference

California's 48th State Assembly district is one of 80 California State Assembly districts. It is currently represented by Democrat Blanca Rubio of Baldwin Park.

== District profile ==
The district encompasses the eastern San Gabriel Valley, along with several foothill communities. The district is primarily suburban and heavily Latino.

Los Angeles County – 4.7%

- Azusa
- Baldwin Park
- Bradbury
- Covina
- Duarte
- El Monte – 37.9%
- Glendora
- Irwindale
- Monrovia – 0.7%
- Valinda
- West Covina – 71.3%

== Election results from statewide races ==
Year	Office	Results
2020	President	Biden 63.7 - 32.7%
2018	Governor	Newsom 64.8 – 35.2%
2018	Senator	Feinstein 51.6 – 48.4%
2016	President	Clinton 65.6 – 28.5%
2016	Senator	Harris 51.9 – 48.1%
2014	Governor	Brown 58.0 – 42.0%
2012	President	Obama 64.1 – 33.4%
2012	Senator	Feinstein 65.3 – 34.7%

== List of assembly members representing the district ==
Due to redistricting, the 48th district has been moved around different parts of the state. The current iteration resulted from the 2021 redistricting by the California Citizens Redistricting Commission.

Assembly members	Party	Years served	Counties represented	Notes
Frank French	Republican	January 5, 1885 – January 3, 1887	San Francisco	
Joseph Windrow	Republican	January 3, 1887 – January 7, 1889	San Francisco	
Thomas C. Maher	Republican	January 7, 1889 – January 5, 1891	San Francisco	
Joseph Windrow	Republican	January 5, 1891 – January 2, 1893	San Francisco	
J. J. McElroy	Democratic	January 2, 1893 – January 7, 1895	Alameda	
Robert Gay	Republican	January 7, 1895 – January 4, 1897	Alameda	
Frank W. Leavitt	Republican	January 4, 1897 – January 2, 1899	Alameda	
Joseph McDonald Kelley	Republican	January 2, 1899 – January 5, 1903	Alameda	
Philip M. Walsh	Republican	January 5, 1903 – January 4, 1909	Alameda	
James T. Feeley	Republican	January 4, 1909 – January 2, 1911	Alameda	
Robert J. Callaghan	Republican	January 2, 1911 – January 6, 1913	Alameda	
John K. Alexander	Democratic	January 6, 1913 – January 4, 1915	Monterey, San Benito	
Arthur Elliott Boyce	Republican	January 4, 1915 – January 8, 1917	Monterey, San Benito	
William Jefferson Martin	Republican	January 8, 1917 – January 3, 1921	Monterey, San Benito	
Daniel McCloskey	Republican	January 3, 1921 – January 8, 1923	Monterey, San Benito	
C. C. Baker	Republican	January 8, 1923 – January 5, 1925	Monterey, San Benito	
Fredrick Eugene Dayton	Republican	January 5, 1925 – January 3, 1927	Monterey, San Benito	
Ellis Walton Hedges Jr.	Republican	January 3, 1927 – January 7, 1929	Monterey, San Benito	
Ray C. De Yoe	Republican	January 7, 1929 – January 5, 1931	Monterey, San Benito	
Robert Lincoln Patterson	Republican	January 5, 1931 – January 2, 1933	Kern	
Frank G. Martin	Republican	January 2, 1933 – October 9, 1937	Los Angeles	Died in office during his 3rd term.
Vacant		October 9, 1937 – January 2, 1939	Los Angeles	
T. Fenton Knight	Republican	January 2, 1939 – January 3, 1949	Los Angeles	
Bruce V. Reagan	Republican	January 3, 1949 – January 8, 1951	Los Angeles	
Frank D. Lanterman	Republican	January 8, 1951 – January 7, 1963	Los Angeles	
George E. Danielson	Democratic	January 7, 1963 – January 2, 1967	Los Angeles	
David Roberti	Democratic	January 2, 1967 – July 29, 1971	Los Angeles	Resigned from office to be sworn in to the 27th State Senate district after winning the special election.
Vacant		July 29, 1971 – November 19, 1971	Los Angeles	
Bill Brophy	Republican	November 19, 1971 – November 30, 1972	Los Angeles	Sworn in after winning special election to fill the vacant left by Roberti.
Vacant		November 30, 1972 – January 8, 1973	Los Angeles	
Richard Alatorre	Democratic	January 8, 1973 – November 30, 1974	Los Angeles	
Leon D. Ralph	Democratic	December 2, 1974 – November 30, 1976	Los Angeles	
Maxine Waters	Democratic	December 6, 1976 – November 30, 1990	Los Angeles	
Marguerite Archie-Hudson	Democratic	December 3, 1990 – November 30, 1996	Los Angeles	
Roderick Wright	Democratic	December 2, 1996 – November 30, 2002	Los Angeles	
Mark Ridley-Thomas	Democratic	December 2, 2002 – November 30, 2006	Los Angeles	
Mike Davis	Democratic	December 4, 2006 – November 30, 2012	Los Angeles	
Roger Hernández	Democratic	December 3, 2012 – November 30, 2016	Los Angeles	
Blanca Rubio	Democratic	December 5, 2016 – present	Los Angeles	

== Election results (1990–present) ==
=== 2024 ===
2024 California State Assembly 48th district election
Primary election
Party	Candidate	Votes	%
Democratic	Blanca Rubio (incumbent)	27,471	41.4
Republican	Dan Tran	26,226	39.5
Democratic	Brian Calderón Tabatabai	12,712	19.1
Total votes		66,409	100.0
General election
Democratic	Blanca Rubio (incumbent)	101,637	61.8
Republican	Dan Tran	62,880	38.2
Total votes		164,517	100.0
Democratic hold			

=== 2022 ===
2022 California State Assembly 48th district election
Primary election
Party	Candidate	Votes	%
Democratic	Blanca Rubio (incumbent)	38,026	97.1
Republican	Ryan Maye (write-in)	1,138	2.9
Total votes		39,164	100.0
General election
Democratic	Blanca Rubio (incumbent)	60,770	60.8
Republican	Ryan Maye	39,110	39.2
Total votes		99,880	100.0
Democratic hold			

=== 2020 ===
2020 California State Assembly 48th district election
Primary election
Party	Candidate	Votes	%
Democratic	Blanca Rubio (incumbent)	58,432	100.0
Total votes		58,432	100.0
General election
Democratic	Blanca Rubio (incumbent)	126,430	100.0
Total votes		126,430	100.0
Democratic hold			

=== 2018 ===
2018 California State Assembly 48th district election
Primary election
Party	Candidate	Votes	%
Democratic	Blanca Rubio (incumbent)	33,144	100.0
Total votes		33,144	100.0
General election
Democratic	Blanca Rubio (incumbent)	90,105	100.0
Total votes		90,105	100.0
Democratic hold			

=== 2016 ===
2016 California State Assembly 48th district election
Primary election
Party	Candidate	Votes	%
Republican	Cory Ellenson	18,547	26.4
Democratic	Blanca Rubio	17,941	25.5
Democratic	Bryan Urias	16,178	23.0
Democratic	Manuel Lozano	11,510	16.4
Democratic	Armando Barajas	6,129	8.7
Total votes		70,305	100.0
General election
Democratic	Blanca Rubio	87,321	64.1
Republican	Cory Ellenson	48,922	35.9
Total votes		136,243	100.0
Democratic hold			

=== 2014 ===
2014 California State Assembly 48th district election
Primary election
Party	Candidate	Votes	%
Democratic	Roger Hernandez (incumbent)	13,254	48.5
Republican	Joe Gardner	11,187	40.9
No party preference	Mike Meza	2,878	10.5
Total votes		27,319	100.0
General election
Democratic	Roger Hernandez (incumbent)	30,131	54.4
Republican	Joe Gardner	25,284	45.6
Total votes		55,415	100.0
Democratic hold			

=== 2012 ===
2012 California State Assembly 48th district election
Primary election
Party	Candidate	Votes	%
Republican	Joe M. Gardner	15,344	45.6
Democratic	Roger Hernandez (incumbent)	14,625	43.4
No party preference	Mike Meza	3,698	11.0
Total votes		33,667	100.0
General election
Democratic	Roger Hernandez (incumbent)	74,642	59.4
Republican	Joe M. Gardner	50,927	40.6
Total votes		125,569	100.0
Democratic hold			

=== 2010 ===
2010 California State Assembly 48th district election
Party	Candidate	Votes	%
Democratic	Mike Davis (incumbent)	50,825	100.0
Total votes		50,825	100.0
Democratic hold			

=== 2008 ===
2008 California State Assembly 48th district election
Party	Candidate	Votes	%
Democratic	Mike Davis (incumbent)	75,279	87.1
Peace and Freedom	Lucilla Esguerra	11,173	12.9
Total votes		86,452	100.0
Democratic hold			

=== 2006 ===
2006 California State Assembly 48th district election
Party	Candidate	Votes	%
Democratic	Mike Davis	43,310	88.8
Republican	Brenda Green	5,479	11.2
Total votes		48,789	100.0
Democratic hold			

=== 2004 ===
2004 California State Assembly 48th district election
Party	Candidate	Votes	%
Democratic	Mark Ridley-Thomas (incumbent)	68,289	89.1
Republican	Sebastian Alexander	8,333	10.9
Total votes		76,622	100.0
Democratic hold			

=== 2002 ===
2002 California State Assembly 48th district election
Party	Candidate	Votes	%
Democratic	Mark Ridley-Thomas	41,280	87.6
Republican	Gerard Toussaint Robinson	4,427	9.4
Libertarian	Nolayan O. Herdegen	1,421	3.0
Total votes		47,128	100.0
Democratic hold			

=== 2000 ===
2000 California State Assembly 48th district election
Party	Candidate	Votes	%
Democratic	Roderick "Rod" Wright (incumbent)	56,030	94.3
Republican	Ernest Woods	3,394	5.7
Total votes		59,424	100.0
Democratic hold			

=== 1998 ===
1998 California State Assembly 48th district election
Party	Candidate	Votes	%
Democratic	Roderick "Rod" Wright (incumbent)	43,736	94.7
Republican	Ernest Woods	2,455	5.3
Total votes		46,191	100.0
Democratic hold			

=== 1996 ===
1996 California State Assembly 48th district election
Party	Candidate	Votes	%
Democratic	Roderick "Rod" Wright	46,134	100.0
Total votes		46,134	100.0
Democratic hold			

=== 1994 ===
1994 California State Assembly 48th district election
Party	Candidate	Votes	%
Democratic	Marguerite Archie-Hudson (incumbent)	35,150	100.0
Total votes		35,150	100.0
Democratic hold			

=== 1992 ===
1992 California State Assembly 48th district election
Party	Candidate	Votes	%
Democratic	Marguerite Archie-Hudson (incumbent)	55,719	93.1
Republican	Jonathan Leonard	4,159	6.9
Total votes		59,878	100.0
Democratic hold			

=== 1990 ===
1990 California State Assembly 48th district election
Party	Candidate	Votes	%
Democratic	Marguerite Archie-Hudson	25,511	79.3
Republican	Gloria Salazar	4,931	15.3
Libertarian	Jose Castaneda	1,727	5.4
Total votes		32,169	100.00
Democratic hold			

== See also ==
- California State Assembly
- California State Assembly districts
- Districts in California
