= Roger Hernández =

American politician (born 1975)

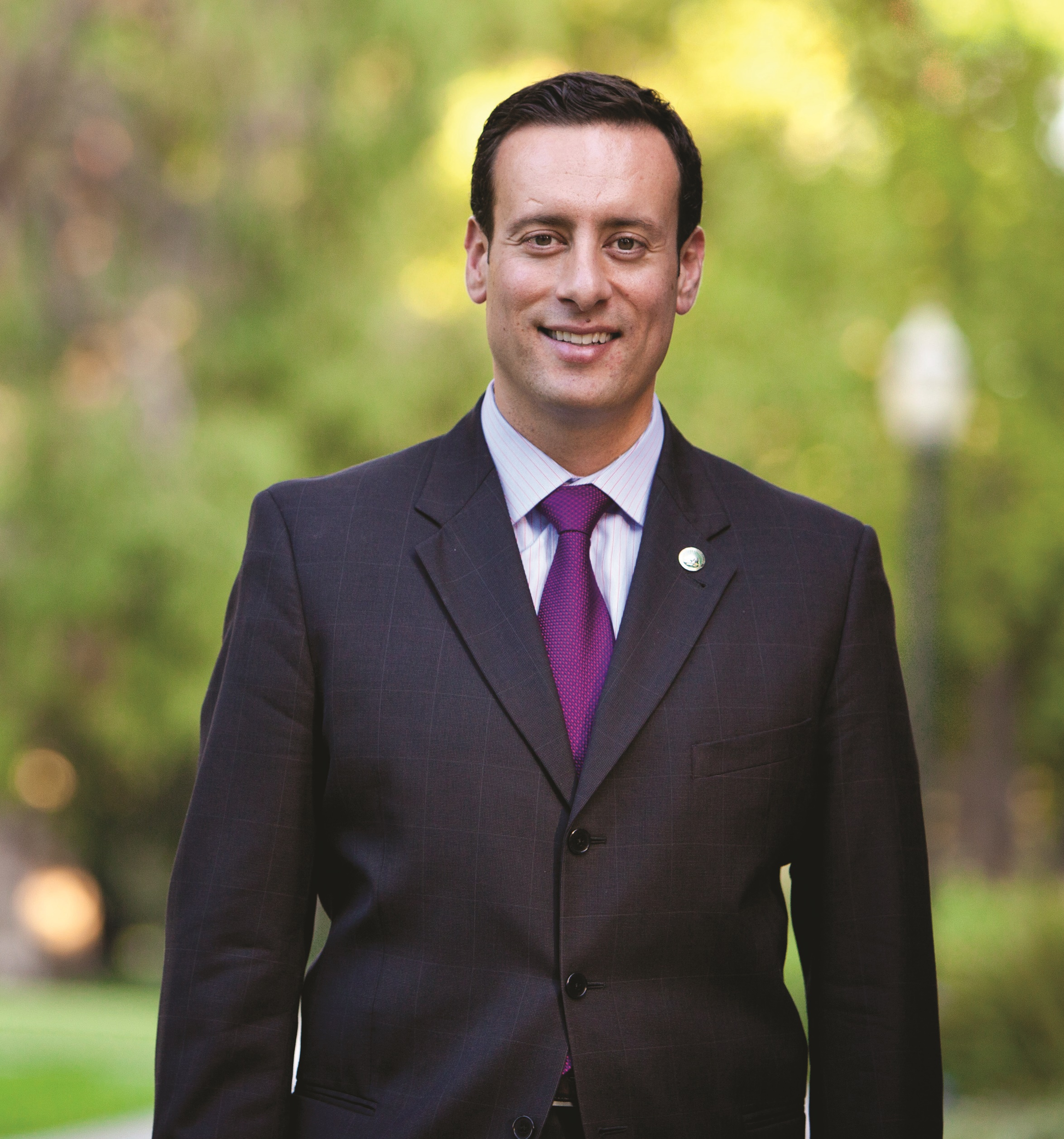

Member of the California State Assembly
- In office December 6, 2010 – November 30, 2016
- Preceded by: Ed Hernandez
- Succeeded by: Blanca Rubio
- Constituency: 57th district (2010–2012); 48th district (2012–2016)

Mayor of West Covina, California
- In office November 18, 2008 – December 1, 2009
- Preceded by: Sherri Lane
- Succeeded by: Shelley Sanderson

West Covina City Council
- In office March 18, 2003 – December 6, 2010
- Preceded by: Mike Touhey
- Succeeded by: Karin Armbrust

Personal details
- Born: July 29, 1975 (age 51) El Monte, California, U.S.
- Party: Democratic
- Spouse: Susan Rubio (m. 2013; sep. 2014)
- Education: University of California, Riverside; University of La Verne

Roger Hernández (born July 29, 1975) is an American former politician who served in the California State Assembly, representing the 48th district.

Prior to being elected to the state assembly, he was the mayor of West Covina, a member of the West Covina City Council, and Professor of Government at Rio Hondo and Citrus Community Colleges. Prior to his tenure on the City Council, Hernández was elected to the Rowland Unified School Board, where he served from November 1999 through July 2003. He lost his bid to return to the West Covina City Council on November 6, 2018, coming in fourth.

== Early life and education ==
Hernández was raised in El Monte and attended Nogales High School. He received a bachelor's degree in political science from the University of California, Riverside, a master's degree in Public Administration from the University of La Verne, and a Master's in Governance Certificate from the California School Boards Association (CSBA).

He has worked as a youth counselor in La Puente, working with at-risk teenagers in an after-school program.

== Career ==
In 1998, at the age of 23, Hernández was elected to the Rowland Unified School Board and implemented community service graduation requirements as well as a parent empowerment program.

In 2003, he was elected to the West Covina City Council.

Hernández was elected to the California State Assembly in 2010 representing the 48th District. As an assemblymember for six years, he passed 34 bills, and co-authored Senate Bill 3, which raised California's minimum wage to $15 an hour.

Hernández petitioned for divorce in 2014 after only a year of marriage claiming "irreconcilable differences" in court documents. He was legally separated from his estranged wife for about a year before the domestic violence allegations, according to court documents.

After being served with a restraining order for domestic violence during divorce proceedings and during his run for his congressional campaign, Hernández was stripped of his committee assignments. A few months later, he took a medical leave of absence.

=== 2014 California State Assembly ===
California's 48th State Assembly district election, 2014
Primary election
Party	Candidate	Votes	%
Democratic	Roger Hernández (incumbent)	13,254	48.5
Republican	Joe Gardner	11,187	40.9
No party preference	Mike Meza	2,878	10.5
Total votes		27,319	100.0
General election
Democratic	Roger Hernández (incumbent)	30,131	54.4
Republican	Joe Gardner	25,284	45.6
Total votes		55,415	100.0
Democratic hold			

=== 2016 run for Congress ===
In 2016, as he was termed out of his Assembly seat, Hernández ran for the United States House of Representatives in the 32nd District, challenging Grace Napolitano. In August, after gaining a spot in the general election following a second-place finish in the primary, he withdrew from the race, citing fallout from his controversial divorce.

== Controversies ==
In 2007, West Covina police responded to Hernández's home after a neighbor reported hearing a loud argument and "someone getting slammed around with a male and female yelling," but no charges were filed. These allegations were also made during Hernández's re-election campaign for the West Covina city council. Hernández claimed that the allegation was politically motivated.

Hernández was arrested for drunk driving in Concord, California on March 27, 2012. A jury later found him not guilty.

The former West Covina public information officer and city manager sued Hernández, alleging a hostile work environment in 2012; this was rejected by a jury.

In January 2015, Hernández was charged with money-laundering by the California Fair Political Practices Commission after a probable cause finding that his campaign committee had filed "an inaccurate semi-annual campaign statement with the Secretary of State, falsely reporting information regarding the true sources of contributions received." The case was later dropped.

In April 2016, while in the process of divorcing his estranged wife Susan Rubio, Hernández was served with a temporary restraining order and ordered to have no contact with Rubio. A city councilmember in Baldwin Park, Rubio claimed that during their marriage Hernández physically attacked and assaulted her, providing photos showing scratches and bruises. In August of the same year, Hernández took a leave of absence but was criticized for continuing to collect per diem reimbursements while on leave.
