= USC Suzanne Dworak-Peck School of Social Work =

School at the University of Southern California

Coordinates: 34.0221°N 118.2826°W

- Type: Private
- Established: 1920
- Parent institution: University of Southern California
- Dean: Laura S. Abrams
- Faculty: 114
- Postgraduates: 1000
- Doctoral students: 22
- Location: Los Angeles, California, United States
- Campus: Urban
- Website: dworakpeck.usc.edu

The USC Suzanne Dworak-Peck School of Social Work at the University of Southern California was founded in 1920 as USC's Division of Social Work. It became the university's School of Social Welfare in 1922 and School of Social Work in 1939. It was the first social work school founded in the western part of the United States. The school's primary location is in Los Angeles, California, with a small program at its San Diego campus.

According to school officials, the facility has 114 faculty teaching an estimated 1,200 enrolled students. It also has the oldest MSW and PhD of Social Work programs in the West.

The school was renamed the USC Suzanne Dworak-Peck School of Social Work in 2016, after USC alumnus Suzanne Dworak-Peck donated $60 million to the school. It is the largest donation ever to a school of social work. The school named a permanent Dean, Laura Abrams, on July 1, 2026.

The program is ranked #67 by the 2024 U.S. News & World Report Best Colleges Ranking and offers PhD in Social Work, Doctor of Social Innovation, Doctor of Social Work, and Master of Social Work degrees. In fall 2027, it began offering a Bachelor of Social Work degree for undergraduate students. An undergraduate minor in Juvenile and Social Justice is also available.

== Notable alumni ==
- Laura Chick, California Inspector General
- Doria Ragland, Yoga instructor, social worker, and mother of Meghan, Duchess of Sussex
- Ira Wohl, Academy Award winner for his 1979 film, Best Boy
- Karen Bass, Mayor of Los Angeles since 2022, Member of the House of Representatives from California's 37th congressional district from 2011 to 2022

== California Social Work Hall of Distinction ==
The California Social Work Hall of Distinction was established in 2002 to honor those involved in bringing about the betterment of society and to ensure that the contributions of social work leaders, innovators and pioneers would be recognized and preserved for the future. It is located in the Montgomery Ross Fisher building on USC campus.
