= California's 36th district =

California's 36th district may refer to:

- California's 36th congressional district
- California's 36th State Assembly district
- California's 36th State Senate district
