= California's 32nd district =

California's 32nd district may refer to:

- California's 32nd congressional district
- California's 32nd State Assembly district
- California's 32nd State Senate district
