= 1990 California State Senate election =

- November 6, 1990

20 seats from even-numbered districts in the California State Senate 21 seats needed for a majority
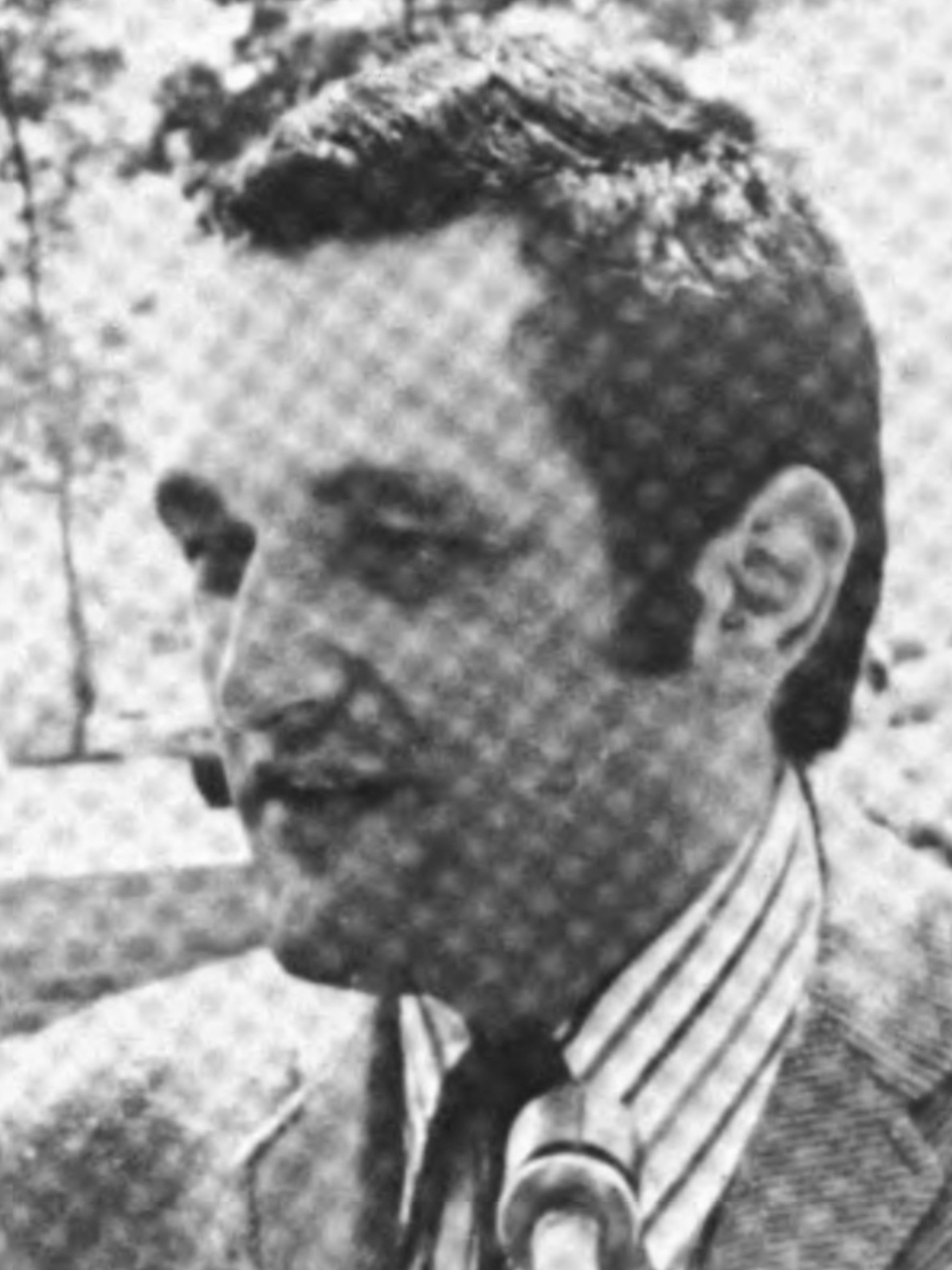

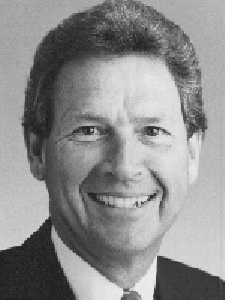
	Majority party	Minority party
Leader	David Roberti	Kenneth L. Maddy
Party	Democratic	Republican
Leader's seat	23rd–Los Angeles	14th–Fresno
Seats before	25	14
Seats after	26	13
Seat change	▲1	▼1
Popular vote	1,598,096	1,426,355
Percentage	48.09%	42.92%
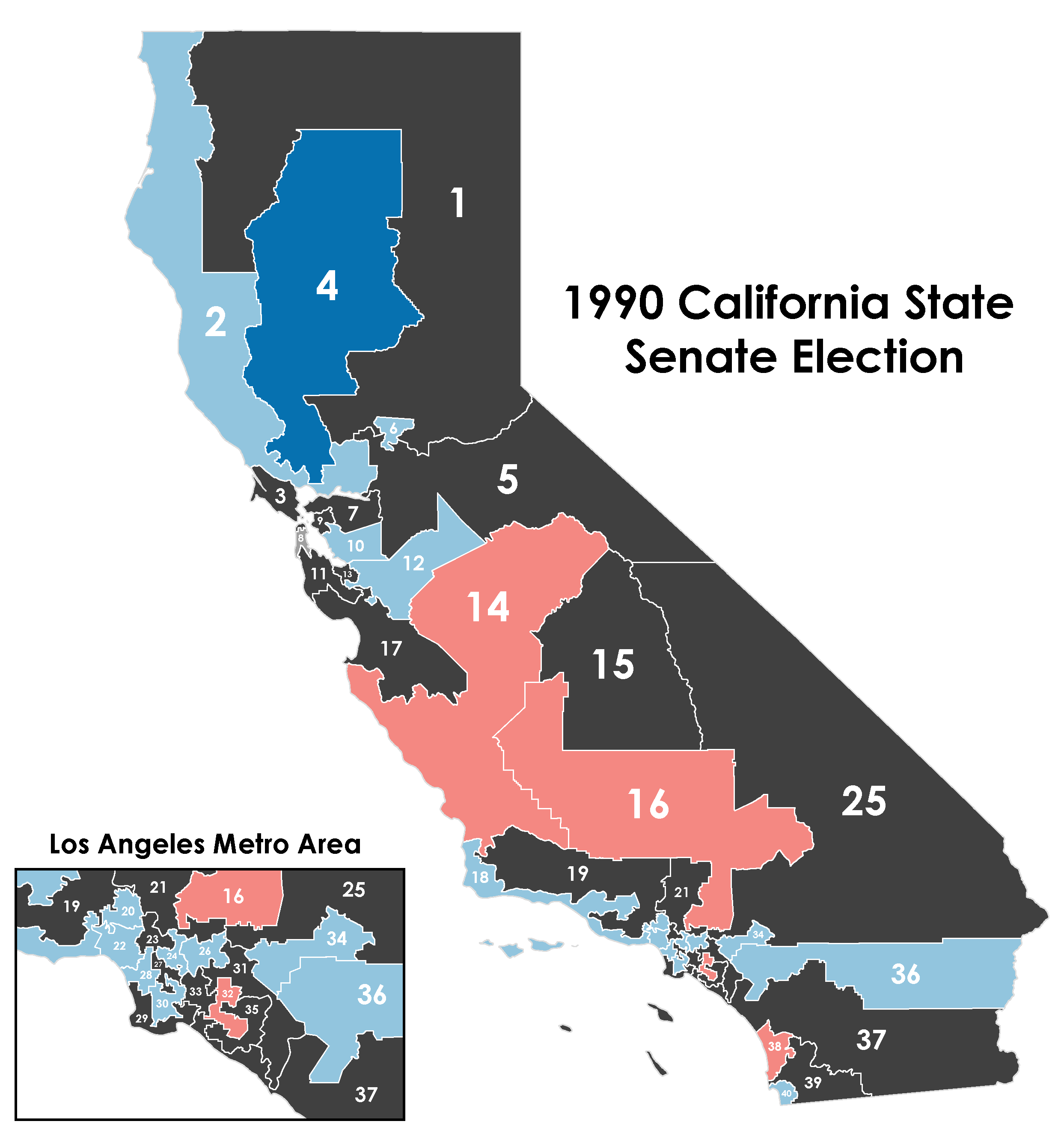
- Results: Democratic gain Democratic hold Republican hold No election held
President pro tempore before election
David Roberti
Democratic
President pro tempore-designate
David Roberti
Democratic

The 1990 California State Senate elections were held on November 6, 1990. Senate seats of even-numbered districts were up for election. Senate terms are staggered so that half the membership is elected every two years. Senators serve four-year terms and are limited to two terms. The Democratic party won 15 seats, gaining a seat from the Republicans. The Republicans won 4 seats, and Independent Quentin L. Kopp was reelected.

== Overview ==
California State Senate elections, 1990
Party	Votes	Percentage	Not up	Incumbents	Open	Before	After	+/–
Democratic	1,598,096	48.09%	5	14	0	19	20	+1
Republican	1,426,355	42.92%	2	5	0	7	6	-1
Independent	116,885	3.52%	0	1	0	1	1	0
Libertarian	98,517	2.96%	0	0	0	0	0	0
Peace and Freedom	83,514	2.51%	0	0	0	0	0	0
Totals	3,323,317	100.00%	7	20	0	27	27	—

== District 2 ==
California's 2nd State Senate district election, 1990
Party	Candidate	Votes	%
Democratic	Barry Keene (incumbent)	126,552	53.99
Republican	Margie Handley	107,864	46.01
Total votes		234,416	100.00
Democratic hold			

== District 4 ==
California's 4th State Senate district election, 1990
Party	Candidate	Votes	%
Democratic	Mike Thompson	125,573	47.67
Republican	Jim Nielsen (incumbent)	123,066	46.72
Libertarian	Juanita A. Hendricks	9,398	3.57
Peace and Freedom	Irv Sutley	5,381	2.04
Total votes		263,418	100.00
Democratic gain from Republican			

== District 6 ==
California's 6th State Senate district election, 1990
Party	Candidate	Votes	%
Democratic	Leroy F. Greene (incumbent)	126,827	53.73
Republican	Joe Sullivan	95,380	40.41
Libertarian	Lawrence R. "Larry" Murray	13,835	5.86
Total votes		236,042	100.00
Democratic hold			

== District 8 ==
California's 8th State Senate district election, 1990
Party	Candidate	Votes	%
Independent	Quentin L. Kopp (incumbent)	116,885	72.71
Democratic	Patrick C. Fitzgerald	28,946	18.00
Republican	Robert Silvestri	14,941	9.29
Total votes		160,772	100.00
Independent hold			

== District 10 ==
California's 10th State Senate district election, 1990
Party	Candidate	Votes	%
Democratic	Bill Lockyer (incumbent)	111,253	60.58
Republican	Howard Hertz	72,390	39.42
Total votes		183,643	100.00
Democratic hold			

== District 12 ==
California's 12th State Senate district election, 1990
Party	Candidate	Votes	%
Democratic	Dan McCorquodale (incumbent)	106,857	59.11
Republican	Lori Kennedy	73,912	40.89
Total votes		180,769	100.00
Democratic hold			

== District 14 ==
California's 14th State Senate district election, 1990
Party	Candidate	Votes	%
Republican	Kenneth L. Maddy (incumbent)	135,369	100.00
Total votes		135,369	100.00
Republican hold			

== District 16 ==
California's 16th State Senate district election, 1990
Party	Candidate	Votes	%
Republican	Don Rogers (incumbent)	85,882	51.97
Democratic	Ray Gonzales	72,796	44.06
Libertarian	Kenneth J. Saurenman	6,554	3.97
Total votes		165,242	100.00
Republican hold			

== District 18 ==
California's 18th State Senate district election, 1990
Party	Candidate	Votes	%
Democratic	Gary K. Hart (incumbent)	111,599	60.35
Republican	Carey Rogers	65,499	35.43
Libertarian	Jay C. Wood	7,796	4.22
Total votes		184,894	100.00
Democratic hold			

== District 20 ==
California's 20th State Senate district election, 1990
Party	Candidate	Votes	%
Democratic	Alan Robbins (incumbent)	73,610	58.28
Republican	David J. Podegracz	43,129	34.14
Libertarian	William J. Mirken	9,575	7.58
Total votes		126,314	100.00
Democratic hold			

== District 22 ==
California's 22nd State Senate district election, 1990
Party	Candidate	Votes	%
Democratic	Herschel Rosenthal (incumbent)	129,939	64.61
Republican	Michael Schrager	62,193	30.93
Peace and Freedom	Margery Hinds	8,969	4.46
Total votes		201,101	100.00
Democratic hold			

== District 24 ==
California's 24th State Senate district election, 1990
Party	Candidate	Votes	%
Democratic	Arthur Torres (incumbent)	39,644	68.96
Republican	Keith F. Marsh	14,157	24.63
Libertarian	David L. Wilson	3,685	6.41
Total votes		57,486	100.00
Democratic hold			

== District 26 ==
California's 26th State Senate district election, 1990
Party	Candidate	Votes	%
Democratic	Charles Calderon (incumbent)	60,801	62.78
Republican	Joe Aguilar	30,984	32.00
Libertarian	Kim Goldsworthy	5,055	5.22
Total votes		96,840	100.00
Democratic hold			

== District 28 ==
California's 28th State Senate district election, 1990
Party	Candidate	Votes	%
Democratic	Diane Watson (incumbent)	102,562	85.19
Peace and Freedom	Ivan William Kasinoff	17,836	14.81
Total votes		120,398	100.00
Democratic hold			

== District 30 ==
California's 30th State Senate district election, 1990
Party	Candidate	Votes	%
Democratic	Ralph C. Dills (incumbent)	63,771	68.28
Republican	Timothy Poling	29,625	31.72
Total votes		93,396	100.00
Democratic hold			

== District 32 ==
California's 32nd State Senate district election, 1990
Party	Candidate	Votes	%
Republican	Ed Royce (incumbent)	80,788	61.26
Democratic	Evelyn Colon Becktell	51,086	38.74
Total votes		131,874	100.00
Republican hold			

== District 34 ==
California's 34th State Senate district election, 1990
Party	Candidate	Votes	%
Democratic	Ruben Ayala (incumbent)	80,949	51.79
Republican	Charles W. Bader	75,352	48.21
Total votes		156,301	100.00
Democratic hold			

== District 36 ==
California's 36th State Senate district election, 1990
Party	Candidate	Votes	%
Democratic	Robert B. Presley (incumbent)	112,560	53.57
Republican	Ray Haynes	97,558	46.43
Total votes		210,118	100.00
Democratic hold			

== District 38 ==
California's 38th State Senate district election, 1990
Party	Candidate	Votes	%
Republican	William A. Craven (incumbent)	171,208	66.76
Peace and Freedom	Jane Rocio Evans	46,645	18.19
Libertarian	Scott Olmsted	38,582	15.05
Total votes		256,435	100.00
Republican hold			

== District 40 ==
California's 40th State Senate district election, 1990
Party	Candidate	Votes	%
Democratic	Wadie P. Deddeh (incumbent)	72,771	56.64
Republican	Muriel C. Watson	47,058	36.62
Peace and Freedom	Roger Bruce Batchelder	4,683	3.64
Libertarian	Eric Moths	3,987	3.10
Total votes		128,499	100.00
Democratic hold			
