= Bob Archuleta =

American politician (born 1945)

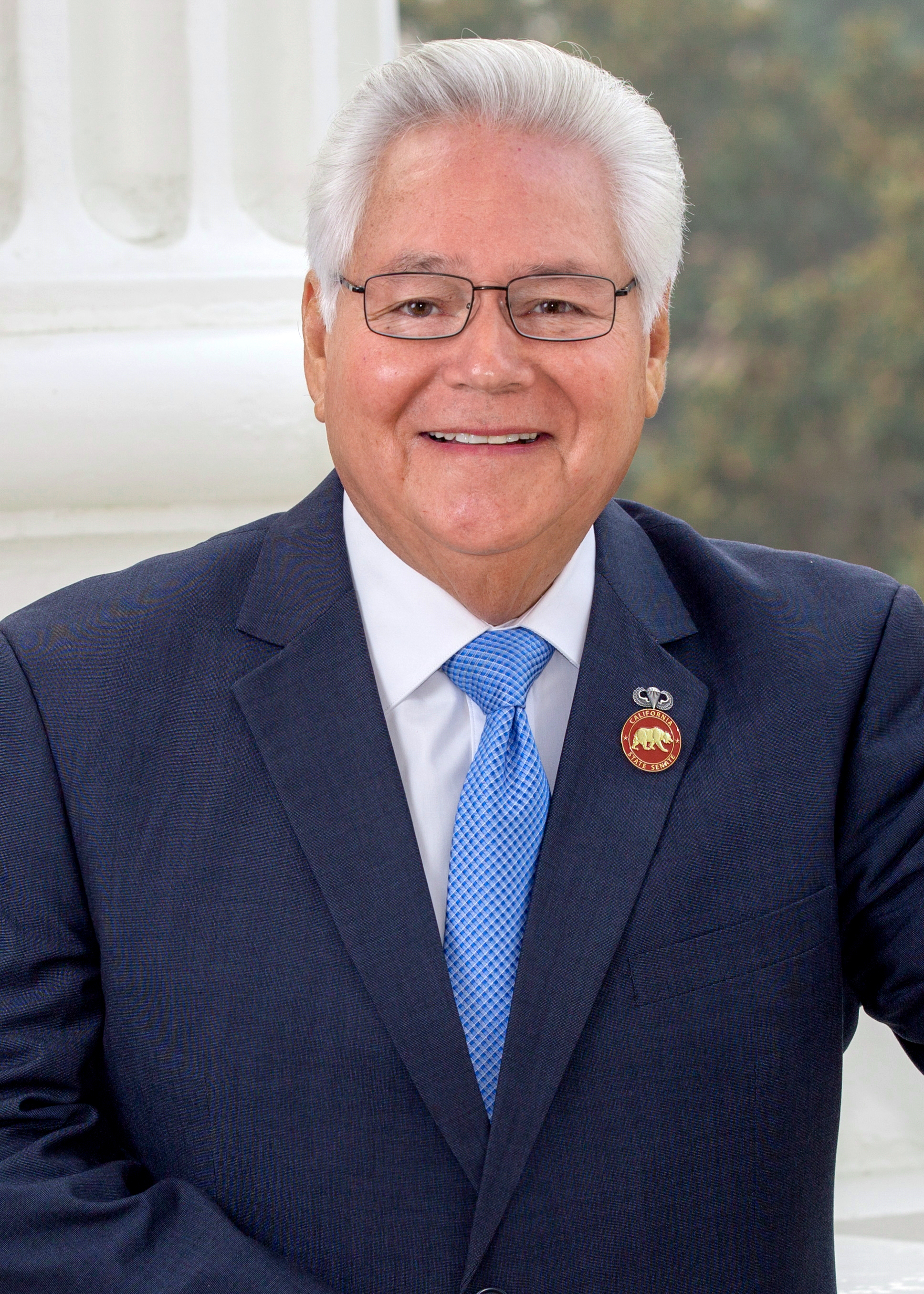

Member of the California State Senate
- Incumbent
- Assumed office December 3, 2018
- Preceded by: Vanessa Delgado
- Constituency: 32nd district (2018–2022); 30th district (2022–present)

Personal details
- Born: Bob Jerry Archuleta; June 1, 1945 (age 81)
- Party: Democratic
- Spouse: Rose
- Children: 5

Bob Jerry Archuleta (born June 1, 1945) is an American politician serving in the California State Senate. He is a Democrat representing the 30th district, encompassing parts of southeastern Los Angeles County & Orange County. Prior to being elected to the state senate, he served on the Pico Rivera City Council.

Archuleta ran for the California state Senate in 2018 in both a special election to fill the seat left vacant by the resignation of incumbent Democrat Tony Mendoza, as well as the regularly scheduled election. Mendoza resigned to avoid a possible expulsion vote from the State Senate after being accused of years of sexual harassment of female former aides. Although he had resigned the seat, Mendoza also ran in both elections. Archuleta narrowly lost the special election to Montebello Mayor Vanessa Delgado, but won the regularly scheduled election in a major upset, as Delgado had the support of much of the state Democratic Party's leadership. In 2022, Archuleta ran for reelection, in a district that has since been renumbered as the 30th district. He won the election with 61% of the vote.

Much of his work focuses on the military. He served as a paratrooper with the 82nd Airborne Division. He has been involved with the United States Military Academy at West Point, & the United States Army Advisory Board for Military Recruitment. As of July 2024, he chairs the Senate Committee on Military & Veterans Affairs.

He also has served on the Los Angeles County Library Commission & with the Montebello Police Department.

== Policies ==
In 2024, Archuleta introduced a bill that would require all males in California to register for selective service before renewing or receiving a new drivers license.

== Electoral history ==
2018 California State Senate 32nd district election
Primary election
Party	Candidate	Votes	%
Republican	Rita Topalian	28,979	24.4
Democratic	Bob Archuleta	20,652	17.4
Democratic	Vanessa Delgado (incumbent)	18,709	15.7
Democratic	Tony Mendoza	11,917	10.0
Republican	Ion Sarega	11,577	9.7
Democratic	Vicky Santana	8,236	6.9
Democratic	Ali S. Taj	6,349	5.3
Democratic	Vivian Romero	5,495	4.6
Democratic	Rudy Bermudez	5,455	4.6
Democratic	David Castellanos	1,541	1.3
Total votes		118,910	100.0
General election
Democratic	Bob Archuleta	177,054	66.9
Republican	Rita Topalian	87,520	33.1
Total votes		264,574	100.0
Democratic hold			

2022 California State Senate 30th district election
Primary election
Party	Candidate	Votes	%
Democratic	Bob Archuleta (incumbent)	43,243	35.6
Republican	Mitch Clemmons	41,287	34.0
Democratic	Martha Camacho Rodriguez	19,011	15.7
Democratic	Henry Bouchot	17,820	14.7
Total votes		121,361	100.0
General election
Democratic	Bob Archuleta (incumbent)	129,890	61.0
Republican	Mitch Clemmons	83,214	39.0
Total votes		213,104	100.0
Democratic hold			
