= 2014 California State Senate election =

- November 4, 2014

20 seats from even-numbered districts in the California State Senate 21 seats needed for a majority
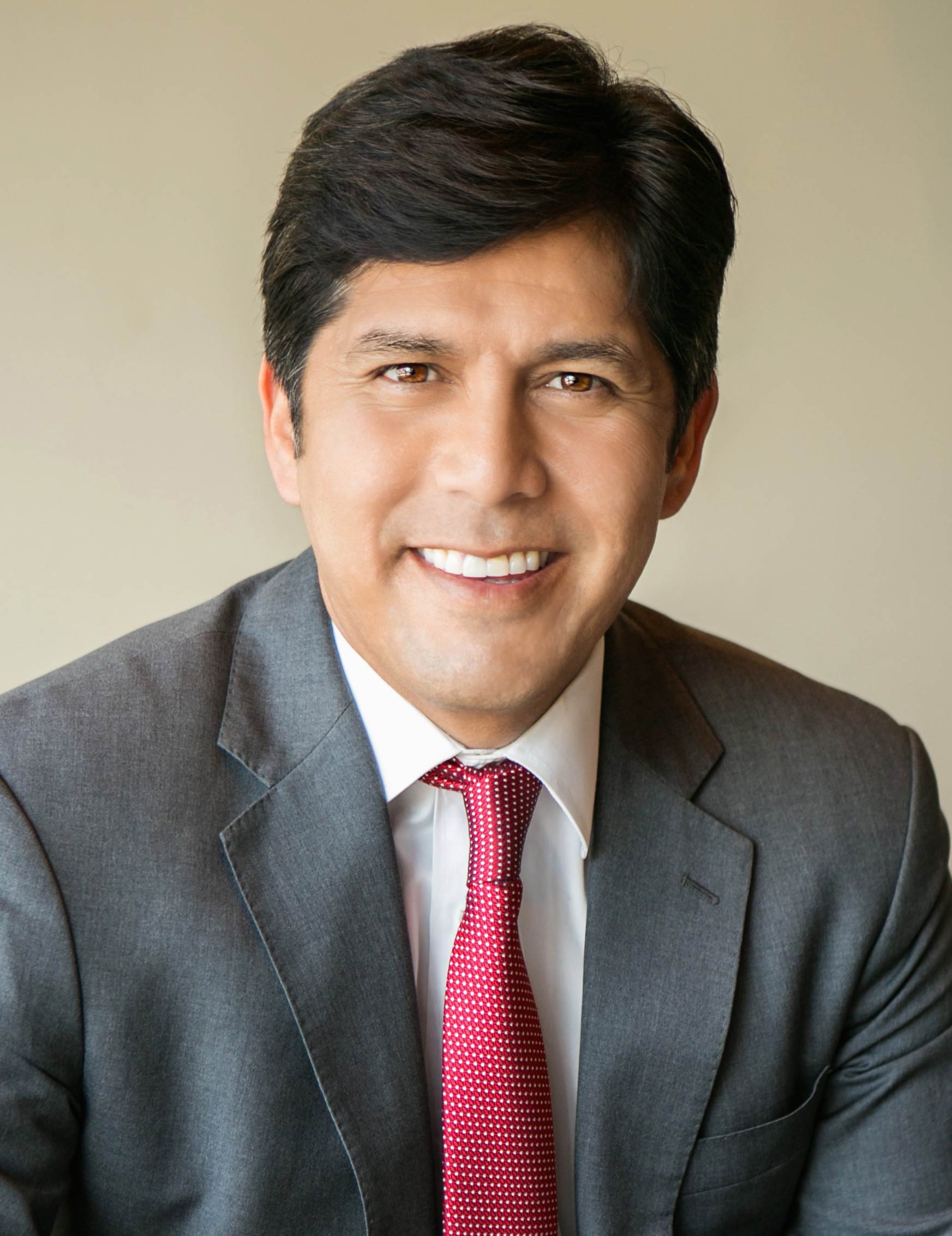

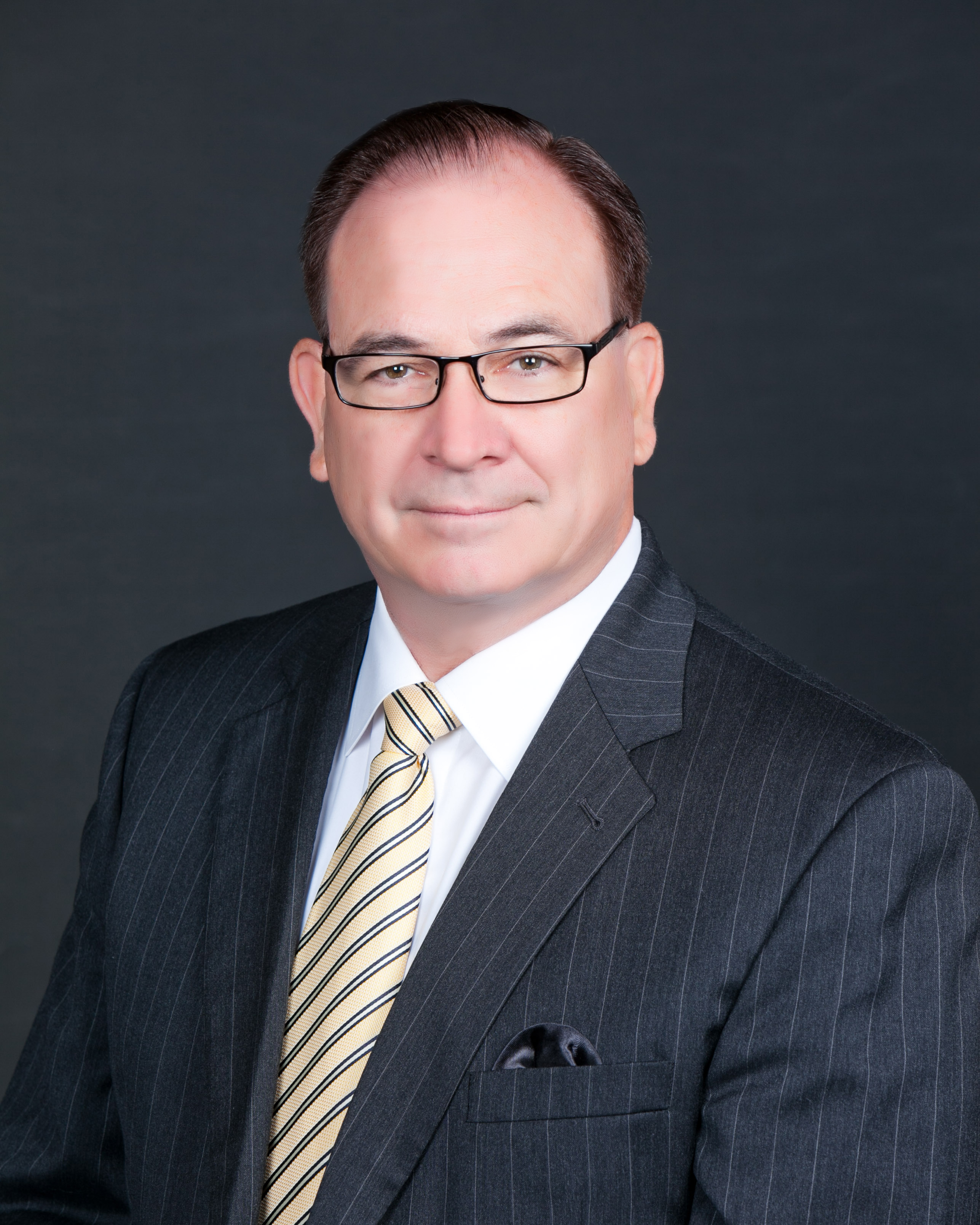
	Majority party	Minority party
Leader	Kevin de León	Bob Huff
Party	Democratic	Republican
Leader's seat	24th–Los Angeles	29th–Diamond Bar
Last election	29	11
Seats before	28	12
Seats after	26	14
Seat change	▼2	▲2
Popular vote	1,760,892	1,371,020
Percentage	56.22%	43.78%
- Results: Republican gain Democratic hold Republican hold No election held
President pro tempore before election
Kevin de León
Democratic
President pro tempore-designate
Kevin de León
Democratic

The 2014 California State Senate election was held on Tuesday, November 4, 2014, with the primary election on June 3, 2014. Voters in the 20 even-numbered districts of the California State Senate elected their representatives. The elections coincided with the elections for other offices, including the State Assembly election and the gubernatorial election.

The California Republican Party won the newly drawn 28th district and the open 34th district, gaining two seats from the California Democratic Party and ending the Democrats' supermajority in the chamber.

== Overview ==
California State Senate elections, 2014 Primary election — June 3, 2014
Party	Votes	Percentage	Candidates	Advancing to general	Seats contesting
Democratic	923,557	51.63%	40	24	19
Republican	828,207	46.30%	23	16	15
No party preference	32,763	1.83%	3	0	0
Green	4,392	0.25%	1	0	0
Totals	1,788,919	100.00%	67	40	—

California State Senate elections, 2014 General election — November 4, 2014
Party	Votes	Percentage	Not up	Contested	Before	After	+/–
Democratic	1,760,892	56.22%	15	13	28	26	▼2
Republican	1,371,020	43.78%	5	7	12	14	▲2
Totals	3,131,912	100.00%	20	20	40	40	—

↓
26	14
Democratic	Republican

== Predictions ==
Source	Ranking	As of
Governing	Safe D	October 20, 2014

== Results ==
=== District 2 ===
California's 2nd State Senate district election, 2014
Primary election
Party	Candidate	Votes	%
Democratic	Mike McGuire	104,670	57.9
Republican	Lawrence R. Wiesner	48,401	26.8
Democratic	Derek Knell	19,733	10.9
No party preference	Harry V. Lehmann	8,060	4.5
Total votes		180,864	100.0
General election
Democratic	Mike McGuire	188,142	70.0
Republican	Lawrence R. Wiesner	80,778	30.0
Total votes		268,920	100.0
Democratic hold			

=== District 4 ===
California's 4th State Senate district election, 2014
Primary election
Party	Candidate	Votes	%
Republican	Jim Nielsen (incumbent)	92,191	64.0
Democratic	CJ Jawahar	51,781	36.0
Total votes		143,972	100.0
General election
Republican	Jim Nielsen (incumbent)	139,199	63.7
Democratic	CJ Jawahar	79,457	36.3
Total votes		218,656	100.0
Republican hold			

=== District 6 ===
==== Endorsements ====
Roger Dickinson

Individuals

- Dianne Feinstein, U.S. Senator
- Gavin Newsom, Lieutenant Governor of California
- Bill Lockyer, California State Treasurer
- Tom Torlakson, California State Superintendent of Public Instruction
- John Garamendi, U.S. Representative
- Jared Huffman, U.S. Representative
- Darrell Steinberg, President pro tempore of the California State Senate
- Lois Wolk, State Senator
- Don Nottoli, Sacramento County Supervisor
- Phil Serna, Sacramento County Supervisor
- Jimmie Yee, Sacramento County Supervisor
- Mike McGowan, Yolo County Supervisor
- Don Saylor, Yolo County Supervisor
- Jim Provenza, Yolo County Supervisor
- Christopher Cabaldon, Mayor of West Sacramento
- Steve Cohn, Sacramento City Coucilmember
- Bonnie Pannell, Sacramento City Councilmember
- Allen Wayne Warren, Sacramento City Councilmember
- Mark Johannessen, West Sacramento City Councilmember
- William Kristoff, West Sacramento City Councilmember
- Chris Ledesma, West Sacramento City Councilmember
- Oscar Villegas, West Sacramento City Councilmember
- Tej Maan, Yuba City Councilmember
- Bill Slaton, SMUD Board President
- Genevieve Shiroma, SMUD Board Vice President
- Nancy Bui-Thompson, SMUD Board Director
- Howard Posner, SMUD Board Director
- Larry Carr, SMUD Board Director
- Greg Geeting, Sacramento County Board of Education Member
- Pam Haynes, Los Rios Community College Trustee
- Dustin Johnson, Los Rios Community College Trustee
- Steve Ly, Elk Grove School Board Member
- Scott Dosick, Natomas School Boardmember
- Susan Heredia, Natomas School Boardmember
- Lisa Kaplan, Natomas School Boardmember
- Jeff Cueno, Sacramento City School Boardmember
- Patrick Kennedy, Sacramento City School Boardmember
- Christina Pritchett, Sacramento City School Boardmember
- Darrel Woo, Sacramento City School Boardmember
- Michael Baker, Twin River School Boardmember
- Bob Bastian, Twin River School Boardmember
- John Dexter, Twin River School Boardmember
- Walter Garcia Kawamoto, Twin River School Boardmember
- Rebecca Sandoval, Twin River School Boardmember
- Katie Villegas, Washington School Boardmember
- Warren Harding, Arden Manor Park Boardmember
- Kathleen Mast, El Camino Park Boardmember
- Gregg Fishman, Arden Park Recreation and Parks Boardmember
- Jim Lites, Arden Park Recreation and Parks Boardmember
- Linda Kimura, Arden Creek Park Boardmember
- Jerry Fox, Arden Creek Park Boardmember
- Victor H. Fazio, former U.S. Representative
- Phil Angelides, former California State Treasurer
- Sheila Kuehl, former State Senator
- Phil Isenberg, former State Assemblymember
- Heather Fargo, former Mayor of Sacramento
- James Shelby, former Mayor of Citrus Heights
- Robbie Waters, former Sacramento City Councilmember
- Grantland Johnson, former Sacramento County Supervisor
- Toby Johnson, former Sacramento County Supervisor
- Illa Collin, former Sacramento County Supervisor
- Jim Streng, former Sacramento County Supervisor
Richard Pan

Organizations

- Service Employees International Union
- AFSCME California PEOPLE
- California State Employees Association

California's 6th State Senate district election, 2014
Primary election
Party	Candidate	Votes	%
Democratic	Roger Dickinson	48,668	40.3
Democratic	Richard Pan	37,552	31.1
Republican	James Axelgard	19,258	15.9
Republican	Jonathan Zachariou	15,355	12.7
Total votes		120,833	100.0
General election
Democratic	Richard Pan	96,688	53.8
Democratic	Roger Dickinson	82,938	46.2
Total votes		179,626	100.0
Democratic hold			

=== District 8 ===
California's 8th State Senate district election, 2014
Primary election
Party	Candidate	Votes	%
Republican	Tom Berryhill (incumbent)	97,056	65.4
Democratic	Paulina Miranda	51,415	34.6
Total votes		148,471	100.0
General election
Republican	Tom Berryhill (incumbent)	145,587	66.5
Democratic	Paulina Miranda	73,417	33.5
Total votes		219,004	100.0
Republican hold			

=== District 10 ===
California's 10th State Senate district election, 2014
Primary election
Party	Candidate	Votes	%
Democratic	Bob Wieckowski	36,773	35.4
Republican	Peter Kuo	27,332	26.3
Democratic	Mary Hayashi	21,448	20.6
Democratic	Roman Reed	14,098	13.6
No party preference	Audie Bock	4,284	4.1
Total votes		103,935	100.0
General election
Democratic	Bob Wieckowski	111,162	68.0
Republican	Peter Kuo	52,302	32.0
Total votes		163,464	100.0
Democratic hold			

=== District 12 ===
California's 12th State Senate district election, 2014
Primary election
Party	Candidate	Votes	%
Republican	Anthony Cannella (incumbent)	47,551	63.8
Democratic	Shawn K. Bagley	27,017	36.2
Total votes		74,568	100.0
General election
Republican	Anthony Cannella (incumbent)	74,988	60.5
Democratic	Shawn K. Bagley	49,039	39.5
Total votes		124,027	100.0
Republican hold			

=== District 14 ===
California's 14th State Senate district election, 2014
Primary election
Party	Candidate	Votes	%
Republican	Andy Vidak (incumbent)	35,953	61.2
Democratic	Luis Chavez	22,771	38.8
Total votes		58,724	100.0
General election
Republican	Andy Vidak (incumbent)	54,251	54.1
Democratic	Luis Chavez	46,035	45.9
Total votes		100,286	100.0
Republican hold			

=== District 16 ===
California's 16th State Senate district election, 2014
Primary election
Party	Candidate	Votes	%
Republican	Jean Fuller (incumbent)	79,843	99.8
Democratic	Ruth Musser-Lopez (write-in)	189	0.2
Total votes		80,032	100.0
General election
Republican	Jean Fuller (incumbent)	122,700	72.8
Democratic	Ruth Musser-Lopez	45,812	27.2
Total votes		168,512	100.0
Republican hold			

=== District 18 ===
California's 18th State Senate district election, 2014
Primary election
Party	Candidate	Votes	%
Democratic	Robert Hertzberg	35,338	63.1
Republican	Ricardo Antonio Benitez	16,289	29.1
Green	John P. "Jack" Lindblad	4,392	7.8
Total votes		56,019	100.0
General election
Democratic	Robert Hertzberg	79,495	70.2
Republican	Ricardo Antonio Benitez	33,794	29.8
Total votes		113,289	100.0
Democratic hold			

=== District 20 ===
California's 20th State Senate district election, 2014
Primary election
Party	Candidate	Votes	%
Republican	Matthew Munson	14,124	33.0
Democratic	Connie Leyva	9,096	21.2
Democratic	Alfonso "Al" Sanchez	7,958	18.6
Democratic	Shannon O'Brien	6,769	15.9
Democratic	Sylvia Robles	4,843	11.3
Total votes		42,790	100.0
General election
Democratic	Connie Leyva	56,943	62.4
Republican	Matthew Munson	34,256	37.6
Total votes		91,199	100.0
Democratic hold			

=== District 22 ===
California's 22nd State Senate district election, 2014
Primary election
Party	Candidate	Votes	%
Democratic	Ed Hernandez (incumbent)	34,375	99.6
Republican	Marc Rodriguez (write-in)	154	0.4
Total votes		34,529	100.0
General election
Democratic	Ed Hernandez (incumbent)	63,570	64.8
Republican	Marc Rodriguez	34,468	35.2
Total votes		98,038	100.0
Democratic hold			

=== District 24 ===
California's 24th State Senate district election, 2014
Primary election
Party	Candidate	Votes	%
Democratic	Kevin de León (incumbent)	28,975	64.1
Democratic	Peter Choi	9,422	20.8
Republican	William "Rodriguez" Morrison	6,805	15.1
Total votes		45,202	100.0
General election
Democratic	Kevin de León (incumbent)	57,412	65.8
Democratic	Peter Choi	29,848	34.2
Total votes		87,260	100.0
Democratic hold			

=== District 26 ===
California's 26th State Senate district election, 2014
Primary election
Party	Candidate	Votes	%
Democratic	Ben Allen	25,987	22.2
Democratic	Sandra Fluke	22,759	19.4
No party preference	Seth Stodder	20,419	17.4
Democratic	Betsy Butler	19,301	16.5
Democratic	Amy Howorth	18,411	15.7
Democratic	Vito Imbasciani	5,189	4.4
Democratic	Patric Verrone	3,446	2.9
Democratic	Barbi S. Appelquist	1,630	1.4
Total votes		117,142	100.0
General election
Democratic	Ben Allen	122,901	60.3
Democratic	Sandra Fluke	80,781	39.7
Total votes		203,682	100.0
Democratic hold			

=== District 28 ===
California's 28th State Senate district election, 2014
Primary election
Party	Candidate	Votes	%
Republican	Jeff Stone	20,807	21.9
Republican	Bonnie Garcia	18,884	19.9
Republican	Glenn A. Miller	18,435	19.4
Democratic	Phillip Drucker	17,635	18.6
Democratic	Anna Nevenic	14,444	15.2
Republican	William "Bill" Carns	4,834	5.1
Total votes		95,039	100.0
General election
Republican	Jeff Stone	81,698	53.0
Republican	Bonnie Garcia	72,353	47.0
Total votes		154,051	100.0
Republican win (new seat)			

=== District 30 ===
California's 30th State Senate district election, 2014
Primary election
Party	Candidate	Votes	%
Democratic	Holly Mitchell (incumbent)	48,280	85.3
Democratic	Isidro Armenta	8,301	14.7
Total votes		56,581	100.0
General election
Democratic	Holly Mitchell (incumbent)	78,115	68.8
Democratic	Isidro Armenta	35,442	31.2
Total votes		113,557	100.0
Democratic hold			

=== District 32 ===
California's 32nd State Senate district election, 2014
Primary election
Party	Candidate	Votes	%
Republican	Mario Guerra	29,096	44.5
Democratic	Tony Mendoza	20,804	31.8
Democratic	Sally Havice	7,325	11.2
Democratic	Irella Perez	6,873	10.5
Democratic	Carlos Arvizu	1,280	2.0
Total votes		65,378	100.0
General election
Democratic	Tony Mendoza	67,593	52.3
Republican	Mario Guerra	61,718	47.7
Total votes		129,311	100.0
Democratic hold			

=== District 34 ===
California's 34th State Senate district election, 2014
Primary election
Party	Candidate	Votes	%
Republican	Janet Nguyen	46,445	52.0
Democratic	Jose Solorio	29,793	33.3
Republican	Long Pham	13,102	14.7
Total votes		89,340	100.0
General election
Republican	Janet Nguyen	95,792	58.1
Democratic	Jose Solorio	69,220	41.9
Total votes		165,012	100.0
Republican gain from Democratic			

=== District 36 ===
California's 36th State Senate district election, 2014
Primary election
Party	Candidate	Votes	%
Republican	Patricia Bates	88,171	99.1
Democratic	Gary Kephart (write-in)	756	0.9
Total votes		88,927	100.0
General election
Republican	Patricia Bates	140,610	65.7
Democratic	Gary Kephart	73,539	34.3
Total votes		214,149	100.0
Republican hold			

=== District 38 ===
California's 38th State Senate district election, 2014
Primary election
Party	Candidate	Votes	%
Republican	Joel Anderson (incumbent)	87,933	71.1
Democratic	Fotios "Frank" Tsimboukakis	35,656	28.9
Total votes		123,589	100.0
General election
Republican	Joel Anderson (incumbent)	146,510	68.9
Democratic	Fotios "Frank" Tsimboukakis	66,066	30.8
Total votes		212,576	100.0
Republican hold			

=== District 40 ===
California's 40th State Senate district election, 2014
Primary election
Party	Candidate	Votes	%
Democratic	Ben Hueso (incumbent)	45,249	71.9
Democratic	Rafael Estrada	17,547	27.9
Republican	Michael Diaz (write-in)	188	0.3
Total votes		62,984	100.0
General election
Democratic	Ben Hueso (incumbent)	58,880	54.9
Democratic	Rafael Estrada	48,397	45.1
Total votes		107,277	100.0
Democratic hold			
