= Rob Hurtt =

American politician (born 1944)

Robert S. Hurtt Jr.
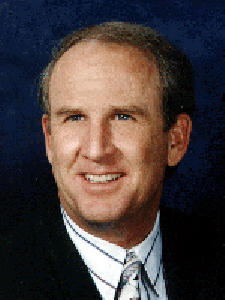

Member of the California Senate from the 34th district
- In office December 5, 1994 – November 30, 1998
- Preceded by: Ruben Ayala
- Succeeded by: Joe Dunn

Member of the California Senate from the 32nd district
- In office March 8, 1993 – November 30, 1994
- Preceded by: Ed Royce
- Succeeded by: Ruben Ayala

Personal details
- Born: May 19, 1944 (age 82) Santa Monica, California, U.S.
- Party: Republican
- Spouse: Nancy
- Children: 4
- Education: Claremont McKenna College

Robert S. Hurtt Jr. (born May 19, 1944) is an American Republican politician who was the California State Senate Republican Leader from August 1995 to March 1998.

A native Californian, Hurtt was born in Santa Monica, he has resided in Orange County since graduating from Claremont McKenna College in 1966 with a Bachelor of Arts in economics.

A businessman, Hurtt owns and operates a manufacturing company, Container Supply Company, of which he has been president for over 30 years and currently employs more than 200 people. Under Hurtt's presidency, Container Supply Company donated $278,070 to the 2008 campaign to ban same-sex marriage in California.

Hurtt was elected to the Senate in a 1993 special election with 76% of the vote to represent the 32nd District after Senator Ed Royce vacated the seat to become a member of Congress. After redistricting, the district was renumbered the 34th District. During the 1990s, the 34th district consisted of portions of Anaheim, Fountain Valley, Garden Grove, La Palma, Santa Ana, Buena Park, Midway City, Stanton, and Westminster.

Elected to a full term in 1994, his priorities in the Senate were "reducing job-killing business regulation, eliminating wasteful government spending, expanding commitment to public safety, improving education, and reforming tax policies."

In 1998, Hurtt sought a second full term but was unexpectedly upset by attorney Joe Dunn, who defeated Hurtt by 51% to 49%.

Hurtt and his wife, Nancy, have four children and two grandchildren.

California Senate
Preceded by Ed Royce	California State Senator; 32nd District; 1993–1994	Succeeded by Ruben S. Ayala
Preceded by Ruben S. Ayala	California State Senator; 34th District; 1994–1998	Succeeded by Joe Dunn
Party political offices
Preceded by Ken Maddy	California State Senate Republican Leader; August 24, 1995–March 16, 1998	Succeeded by Ross Johnson
