= California's 30th district =

California's 30th district may refer to:

- California's 30th congressional district
- California's 30th State Assembly district
- California's 30th State Senate district
