= California's 34th district =

California's 34th district may refer to:

- California's 34th congressional district
- California's 34th State Assembly district
- California's 34th State Senate district
