= California's 38th district =

California's 38th district may refer to:

- California's 38th congressional district
- California's 38th State Assembly district
- California's 38th State Senate district
