= 2002 California State Senate election =

- November 5, 2002

20 seats from even-numbered districts in the California State Senate 21 seats needed for a majority
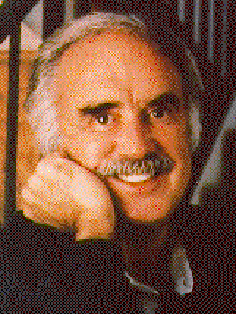

	Majority party	Minority party
Leader	John Burton	Jim Brulte
Party	Democratic	Republican
Leader's seat	3rd–San Francisco	31st–Rancho Cucamonga
Seats before	26	14
Seats after	25	15
Seat change	▼1	▲1
Popular vote	1,635,495	1,323,777
Percentage	53.78%	43.53%
Swing	▲2.49pp	▼0.67pp
- Results: Republican gain Democratic hold Republican hold No election held
President pro tempore before election
John L. Burton
Democratic
President pro tempore-designate
John L. Burton
Democratic

The 2002 California State Senate elections were held on November 5, 2002. Senate seats of even-numbered districts were up for election. Senate terms are staggered so that half the membership is elected every two years. Senators serve four-year terms and are limited to two terms. As was expected, the Democratic Party held on to the majority of the seats, though they lost one.

== Overview ==
California State Senate elections, 2002
Party	Votes	Percentage	Not up	Incumbents	Open	Before	After	+/–
Democratic	1,635,495	53.78%	12	11	3	26	25	-1
Republican	1,323,777	43.53%	8	3	3	14	15	+1
Libertarian	76,243	2.51%	0	0	0	0	0	0
Independent	5,635	0.19%	0	0	0	0	0	0
Invalid or blank votes	310,379	9.26%	—	—	—	—	—	—
Totals	3,351,529	100.00%	20	14	6	40	40	—

== Predictions ==
Source	Ranking	As of
The Cook; Political Report	Safe D	October 4, 2002

== Results ==
Final results from the California Secretary of State:

=== District 2 ===
California's 2nd State Senate district election, 2002
Party	Candidate	Votes	%
Democratic	Wesley Chesbro (incumbent)	156,755	63.45
Republican	Peggy Redfearn	80,079	32.41
Libertarian	Laura Jean Likover	10,210	4.13
Invalid or blank votes		12,214	4.71
Total votes		259,258	100.00
Democratic hold			

=== District 4 ===
California's 4th State Senate district election, 2002
Party	Candidate	Votes	%
Republican	Samuel Aanestad	148,023	58.02
Democratic	Marianne Smith	92,786	36.37
Libertarian	Robert H. Underwood	14,325	5.61
Invalid or blank votes		13,850	5.15
Total votes		268,984	100.00
Republican hold			

=== District 6 ===
California's 6th State Senate district election, 2002
Party	Candidate	Votes	%
Democratic	Deborah Ortiz (incumbent)	122,126	70.70
Republican	Jason A. Swewll	44,972	26.04
Independent	Yolanda Knaak (write-in)	5,635	3.26
Invalid or blank votes		0	0.00
Total votes		172,733	100.00
Democratic hold			

=== District 8 ===
California's 8th State Senate district election, 2002
Party	Candidate	Votes	%
Democratic	Jackie Speier (incumbent)	158,999	78.16
Republican	Dennis Zell	38,881	19.11
Libertarian	Robert Fliegler	5,540	2.72
Invalid or blank votes		0	0.00
Total votes		203,420	100.00
Democratic hold			

=== District 10 ===
California's 10th State Senate district election, 2002
Party	Candidate	Votes	%
Democratic	Liz Figueroa (incumbent)	103,247	66.91
Republican	James G. Gunther	46,056	29.85
Libertarian	Ervan Darnell	4,997	3.24
Invalid or blank votes		13,638	8.12
Total votes		167,938	100.00
Democratic hold			

=== District 12 ===
California's 12th State Senate district election, 2002
Party	Candidate	Votes	%
Republican	Jeff Denham	73,877	48.02
Democratic	Rusty Areias	73,034	47.47
Libertarian	David Eaton	6,950	4.52
Invalid or blank votes		9,160	5.62
Total votes		163,021	100.00
Republican hold			

=== District 14 ===
California's 14th State Senate district election, 2002
Party	Candidate	Votes	%
Republican	Chuck Poochigian (incumbent)	175,369	100.00
Invalid or blank votes		62,422	26.25
Total votes		237,791	100.00
Republican hold			

=== District 16 ===
California's 16th State Senate district election, 2002
Party	Candidate	Votes	%
Democratic	Dean Florez	69,503	70.03
Republican	Blair Knox	29,747	29.97
Invalid or blank votes		3,811	3.70
Total votes		103,061	100.00
Democratic hold			

=== District 18 ===
California's 18th State Senate district election, 2002
Party	Candidate	Votes	%
Republican	Roy Ashburn (incumbent)	153,878	100.00
Invalid or blank votes		20,830	11.92
Total votes		174,708	100.00
Republican gain from Democratic			

=== District 20 ===
California's 20th State Senate district election, 2002
Party	Candidate	Votes	%
Democratic	Richard Alarcon (incumbent)	88,902	100.00
Invalid or blank votes		35,228	28.38
Total votes		124,130	100.00
Democratic hold			

=== District 22 ===
California's 22nd State Senate district election, 2002
Party	Candidate	Votes	%
Democratic	Gilbert Cedillo	68,282	100.00
Invalid or blank votes		22,425	24.72
Total votes		90,707	100.00
Democratic hold			

=== District 24 ===
California's 24th State Senate district election, 2002
Party	Candidate	Votes	%
Democratic	Gloria Romero (incumbent)	79,227	71.32
Republican	Vince House	29,124	26.22
Libertarian	Carl M. "Marty" Swinney	2,741	2.47
Invalid or blank votes		8,106	6.80
Total votes		119,198	100.00
Democratic hold			

=== District 26 ===
California's 26th State Senate district election, 2002
Party	Candidate	Votes	%
Democratic	Kevin Murray (incumbent)	123,814	100.00
Invalid or blank votes		33,620	21.35
Total votes		157,434	100.00
Democratic hold			

=== District 28 ===
California's 28th State Senate district election, 2002
Party	Candidate	Votes	%
Democratic	Debra Bowen (incumbent)	114,145	61.76
Republican	Jo Ann Hill	64,627	34.97
Libertarian	Peter D. De Baets	6,041	3.27
Invalid or blank votes		12,580	6.37
Total votes		197,393	100.00
Democratic hold			

=== District 30 ===
California's 30th State Senate district election, 2002
Party	Candidate	Votes	%
Democratic	Martha M. Escutia (incumbent)	80,562	67.10
Republican	John O. Robertson	39,498	32.90
Invalid or blank votes		8,905	6.90
Total votes		128,965	100.00
Democratic hold			

=== District 32 ===
California's 32nd State Senate district election, 2002
Party	Candidate	Votes	%
Democratic	Nell Soto (incumbent)	60,761	67.62
Republican	Ken Robertson	29,101	32.38
Invalid or blank votes		8,484	8.63
Total votes		98,346	100.00
Democratic hold			

=== District 34 ===
California's 34th State Senate district election, 2002
Party	Candidate	Votes	%
Democratic	Joe Dunn (incumbent)	63,485	61.93
Republican	Araceli Gonzalez	39,025	38.07
Invalid or blank votes		0	0.00
Total votes		102,510	100.00
Democratic hold			

=== District 36 ===
California's 36th State Senate district election, 2002
Party	Candidate	Votes	%
Republican	Dennis Hollingsworth	151,856	69.53
Democratic	Adrienne Westall	53,280	24.40
Libertarian	Michael S. Metti	13,258	6.07
Invalid or blank votes		19,373	8.15
Total votes		237,767	100.00
Republican hold			

=== District 38 ===
California's 38th State Senate district election, 2002
Party	Candidate	Votes	%
Republican	Bill Morrow (incumbent)	132,577	66.10
Democratic	Philip G. Hanneman	60,182	30.00
Libertarian	Lars R. Grossmith	7,819	3.90
Invalid or blank votes		16,899	7.77
Total votes		217,477	100.00
Republican hold			

=== District 40 ===
California's 40th State Senate district election, 2002
Party	Candidate	Votes	%
Democratic	Denise Moreno Ducheny	66,405	56.35
Republican	Michael S. Giorgino	47,087	39.95
Libertarian	Felix Jeremiah Miranda	4,362	3.70
Invalid or blank votes		8,834	6.97
Total votes		126,688	100.00
Democratic hold			

== See also ==
- California State Assembly
- California State Assembly elections, 2002
- California state elections, 2002
- California State Legislature
- California State Senate Districts
- Districts in California
- Political party strength in U.S. states
