= Vanessa Delgado =

American politician and housing advocate

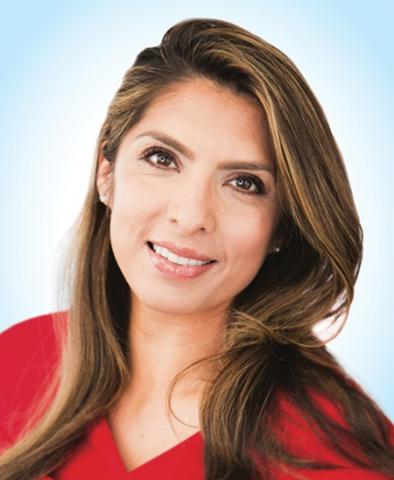

Member of the California State Senate from the 32nd district
- In office August 13, 2018 – December 3, 2018
- Preceded by: Tony Mendoza
- Succeeded by: Bob Archuleta

Personal details
- Born: September 16, 1977 (age 49) Los Angeles, California, U.S.
- Party: Democratic
- Children: 1
- Education: Stanford University; University of Southern California (MPA)

Vanessa Delgado (born September 16, 1977) is an American politician and housing advocate from California. A Democrat, she served in the California State Senate in 2018, and is the former Mayor of Montebello, California.

== Early life ==
Delgado attended Westridge School in Pasadena, California, graduating in 1995. She then earned a bachelor's degree in political science from Stanford University and a Master of Public Administration from the University of Southern California. She then worked in economic development for the cities of Pico Rivera, Anaheim, and Downey, California.

== Political career ==
Delgado ran for the Montebello City Council in 2015, and won. In 2018 she ran for California's 32nd State Senate district. In the elections held on June 5, 2018, there were two contests: one contest for a full four-year term commencing in December of that year, and another contest for the remainder of the term of Tony Mendoza, who resigned earlier in the year. Delgado placed third in the primary contest for the full four-year term, eliminating her from the November general election. She placed second in the special election race for the vacant term which expires in November 2018, allowing her to advance to a runoff election held August 2018. She won the runoff election held on August 7.

Knowing she would serve the shortest amount of time in the California State Senate since Orrin Hubbell served only 15 weeks in 1903, Delgado explored whether she could instead remain Mayor of Montebello. Accepting that she could not remain in Montebello politics, Delgado was sworn in as a state senator on August 13, 2018, the same day she resigned from her positions as Mayor of Montebello and as a member of the Montebello City Council. She served a 112-day term before leaving the state Senate on December 3, 2018.

On May 3, 2019, she was appointed to the South Coast Air Quality Management District Board of Directors. She became chair of the AQMD in 2023, making her the first Latina to ever chair the AQMD. Despite having only served for 112 days, she identifies as "Senator (Ret.)" as her title.

== Personal life ==
Delgado has one daughter, named Isabella, who was born circa 2003.
