= California's 28th senatorial district =

American legislative district

California's 28th State Senate district
Current senator
Lola Smallwood-Cuevas; D–Los Angeles
- Population (2010) • Voting age • Citizen voting age: 930,072; 677,516; 529,628
- Demographics: 47.63% White; 3.96% Black; 40.85% Latino; 5.79% Asian; 0.84% Native American; 0.28% Hawaiian/Pacific Islander; 0.21% other; 0.45% remainder of multiracial
- Registered voters: 491,228
- Registration: 37.14% Democratic; 35.65% Republican; 20.88% No party preference

California's 28th senatorial district is one of 40 California State Senate districts. It is currently represented by Democrat Lola Smallwood-Cuevas of Los Angeles.

== District profile ==
The district contains Downtown Los Angeles and most of South Los Angeles, including Park La Brea, Pico-Union, Mid City, West Adams, Baldwin Hills, Hyde Park, Nevin, Leimert Park, Jefferson Park, Crenshaw, Vermont Square, Adams-Normandie, Florence, Exposition Park, University Park, and Skid Row. It also includes suburbs of Culver City, Ladera Heights, and a small part of the Westside Los Angeles neighborhoods, including Palms, Mar Vista, and Playa Vista.

== Election results from statewide races ==
Year	Office	Results
2020	President	Biden 50.9 – 47.3%
2018	Governor	Cox 52.5 – 47.5%
2018	Senator	de Leon 50.8 – 49.2%
2016	President	Trump 48.5 – 46.7%
2016	Senator	Harris 55.1 – 44.9%
2014	Governor	Kashkari 52.9 – 47.1%
2012	President	Romney 52.6 – 45.5%
2012	Senator	Emken 52.0 – 48.0%

== List of senators representing the district ==
Due to redistricting, the 28th district has been moved around different parts of the state. The current iteration resulted from the 2021 redistricting by the California Citizens Redistricting Commission.

Senators	Party	Years served	Electoral history	Counties represented
George Oulton (Fort Jones)	Republican	January 6, 1862 – December 7, 1863	Elected in 1861. [data missing]	Siskiyou
George Oulton (Fort Jones)	Union	January 6, 1862 – December 7, 1863	Elected in 1861. [data missing]	Siskiyou
L. M. Foulke (Gazelle)	Union	December 7, 1863 – December 4, 1865	Elected in 1863. [data missing]	Siskiyou
E. Wadsworth (Yreka)	Union	December 4, 1865 – December 6, 1869	Elected in 1865. [data missing]	Siskiyou
William Irwin (Yreka)	Democratic	December 6, 1869 – December 9, 1875	Elected in 1868. Re-elected in 1871. Re-elected in 1873. Resigned to run for Governor of California.	Siskiyou
Vacant		December 9, 1875 – March 1, 1875		Siskiyou
Wiley J. Tinnin (Weaverville)	Democratic	March 1, 1875 – December 3, 1877	Elected to finish Irwin's term. [data missing]	Modoc, Shasta, Siskiyou, Trinity
Daniel Ream (Yreka)	Democratic	December 3, 1877 – January 5, 1880	Elected in 1877. [data missing]	Modoc, Shasta, Siskiyou, Trinity
A. B. Carlock (Fort Jones)	Republican	January 5, 1880 – January 8, 1883	Elected in 1879. [data missing]	Modoc, Shasta, Siskiyou, Trinity
Clay W. Taylor (Shasta)	Democratic	January 8, 1883 – January 3, 1887	Elected in 1882. [data missing]	Modoc, Shasta, Siskiyou, Trinity
John Spellacy (San Francisco)	Democratic	January 3, 1887 – January 5, 1891	Elected in 1886. [data missing]	San Francisco
Thomas C. Maher (San Francisco)	Republican	January 5, 1891 – January 7, 1895	Elected in 1890. Redistricted to the 19th district.	San Francisco
John L. Beard (Centerville)	Republican	January 7, 1895 – January 2, 1899	Elected in 1894. [data missing]	Alameda
E. K. Taylor (Alameda)	Republican	January 2, 1899 – January 5, 1903	Elected in 1898. [data missing]	Alameda
Charles M. Shortridge (San Jose)	Independent	January 5, 1903 – January 7, 1907	Redistricted from the 30th district and re-elected in 1902. Lost re-election.	Santa Clara
Marshall Black (Santa Clara)	Republican	January 7, 1907 – January 2, 1913	Elected in 1906. Recalled from office.	Santa Clara
Herbert C. Jones (Santa Clara)	Republican	January 2, 1913 – January 5, 1931	Elected to finish Black's term. Re-elected in 1914. Re-elected in 1918. Re-elected in 1922. Re-elected in 1926. Redistricted to the 18th district.	Santa Clara
Joe Riley (Bishop)	Republican	January 5, 1931 – January 7, 1935	Elected in 1930. Lost re-election.	Inyo, Mono
Karl P. Keough (Bridgeport)	Democratic	January 7, 1935 – September 27, 1937	Elected in 1934. Died.	Inyo, Mono
Vacant		September 27, 1937 – January 2, 1939		Inyo, Mono
Charles Brown (Shoshone)	Democratic	January 2, 1939 – January 7, 1963	Elected in 1938. Re-elected in 1942. Re-elected in 1946. Re-elected in 1950. Re-elected in 1954. Re-elected in 1958. Lost re-election.	Inyo, Mono
Charles Brown (Shoshone)	Republican	January 2, 1939 – January 7, 1963	Elected in 1938. Re-elected in 1942. Re-elected in 1946. Re-elected in 1950. Re-elected in 1954. Re-elected in 1958. Lost re-election.	Inyo, Mono
William Symons Jr. (Bishop)	Republican	January 7, 1963 – January 2, 1967	Elected in 1962. [data missing]	Alpine, Inyo, Mono
Alfred H. Song (Monterey Park)	Democratic	January 2, 1967 – November 30, 1974	Elected in 1966. Re-elected in 1970. Redistricted to the 26th district.	Los Angeles
Ralph C. Dills (Paramount)	Democratic	December 2, 1974 – November 30, 1982	Redistricted from the 32nd district and re-elected in 1974. Re-elected in 1978. Redistricted to the 30th district.	Los Angeles
Diane Watson (Los Angeles)	Democratic	December 6, 1982 – November 30, 1994	Redistricted from the 30th district and re-elected in 1982. Re-elected in 1986. Re-elected in 1990. Redistricted to the 26th district.	Los Angeles
Ralph C. Dills (Paramount)	Democratic	December 5, 1994 – November 30, 1998	Elected in 1994. Retired due to term limits.	Los Angeles
Debra Bowen (Redondo Beach)	Democratic	December 7, 1998 – November 30, 2006	Elected in 1998. Re-elected in 2002. Retired to run for Secretary of State.	Los Angeles
Jenny Oropeza (Long Beach)	Democratic	December 4, 2006 – October 20, 2010	Elected in 2006. Died and posthumously won re-election.	Los Angeles
Vacant		October 20, 2010 – February 18, 2011		Los Angeles
Ted Lieu (Torrance)	Democratic	February 18, 2011 – November 30, 2014	Elected to finish Oropeza's term. Retired to run for U.S. House of Representatives.	Los Angeles
Jeff Stone (La Quinta)	Republican	December 1, 2014 – November 1, 2019	Elected in 2014. Re-elected in 2018. Resigned to accept appointment to the U.S. Department of Labor.	Riverside
Vacant		November 1, 2019 – May 18, 2020		Riverside
Melissa Melendez (Lake Elsinore)	Republican	May 18, 2020 – November 30, 2022	Elected to finish Stone's term. Redistricted to the 32nd district and retired to run for U.S. House of Representatives.	Riverside
Lola Smallwood-Cuevas (Los Angeles)	Democratic	December 5, 2022 – present	Elected in 2022.	Los Angeles

== Election results (1990-present) ==
=== 2022 ===
2022 California State Senate 28th district election
Primary election
Party	Candidate	Votes	%
Democratic	Lola Smallwood-Cuevas	63,211	44.8
Democratic	Cheryl C. Turner	42,728	30.3
Republican	Joe Lisuzzo	20,785	14.7
Democratic	Kamilah Victoria Moore	9,162	6.5
Democratic	Jamaal A. Gulledge	5,267	3.7
Total votes		141,153	100.0
General election
Democratic	Lola Smallwood-Cuevas	117,315	59.9
Democratic	Cheryl C. Turner	78,453	40.1
Total votes		195,768	100.0
Democratic gain from Republican			

=== 2020 (special) ===
2020 California State Senate 28th district special election Vacancy resulting from the resignation of Jeff Stone
Primary election
Party	Candidate	Votes	%
Republican	Melissa Melendez	86,052	40.2
Democratic	Elizabeth Romero	51,363	24.0
Democratic	Joy Silver	44,316	20.7
Republican	John Schwab	25,978	12.1
Democratic	Anna Nevenic	6,440	3.0
Total votes		214,149	100.0
General election
Republican	Melissa Melendez	105,940	55.4
Democratic	Elizabeth Romero	85,311	44.6
Total votes		191,251	100.0
Republican hold			

=== 2018 ===
2018 California State Senate 28th district election
Primary election
Party	Candidate	Votes	%
Republican	Jeff Stone (incumbent)	89,426	56.0
Democratic	Joy Silver	55,312	34.7
Democratic	Anna Nevenic	14,826	9.3
Total votes		159,564	100.0
General election
Republican	Jeff Stone (incumbent)	151,020	51.6
Democratic	Joy Silver	141,792	48.4
Total votes		292,812	100.0
Republican hold			

=== 2014 ===
2014 California State Senate 28th district election
Primary election
Party	Candidate	Votes	%
Republican	Jeff Stone	20,807	21.9
Republican	Bonnie Garcia	18,884	19.9
Republican	Glenn A. Miller	18,435	19.4
Democratic	Phillip Drucker	17,635	18.6
Democratic	Anna Nevenic	14,444	15.2
Republican	William "Bill" Carns	4,834	5.1
Total votes		95,039	100.0
General election
Republican	Jeff Stone	81,698	53.0
Republican	Bonnie Garcia	72,353	47.0
Total votes		154,051	100.0
Republican gain from Democratic			

=== 2011 (special) ===
2011 California State Senate 28th district special election Vacancy resulting from the death of Jenny Oropeza
Party	Candidate	Votes	%
Democratic	Ted Lieu	31,723	56.7
Republican	Bob Valentine	14,141	25.3
Republican	Martha Flores Gibson	3,885	6.9
No party preference	Mark Lipman	1,912	3.4
Democratic	Kevin Thomas McGurk	1,416	2.5
Republican	James P. Thompson	1,301	2.3
Republican	Jeffrey E. Fortini	1,246	2.2
No party preference	Michael Chamness	309	0.6
Total votes		55,933	100.0
Democratic hold			

=== 2010 ===
2010 California State Senate 28th district election
Party	Candidate	Votes	%
Democratic	Jenny Oropeza (incumbent)	142,578	58.2
Republican	John S. Stammreich	87,896	35.8
Libertarian	David Ruskin	14,879	6.0
Total votes		245,353	100.0
Democratic hold			

=== 2006 ===
2006 California State Senate 28th district election
Party	Candidate	Votes	%
Democratic	Jenny Oropeza	129,151	61.7
Republican	Cherryl Liddle	72,570	34.7
Libertarian	Peter De Baets	7,485	3.6
Total votes		209,206	100.0
Democratic hold			

=== 2002 ===
2002 California State Senate 28th district election
Party	Candidate	Votes	%
Democratic	Debra Bowen (incumbent)	114,145	61.8
Republican	Jo Ann Hill	64,627	35.0
Libertarian	Peter D. De Baets	6,041	3.3
Total votes		184,813	100.0
Democratic hold			

=== 1998 ===
1998 California State Senate 28th district election
Party	Candidate	Votes	%
Democratic	Debra Bowen	115,672	64.4
Republican	Asha Knott	57,560	32.1
Libertarian	Neal Doner	6,340	3.5
Total votes		179,572	100.0
Democratic hold			

=== 1994 ===
1994 California State Senate 28th district election
Party	Candidate	Votes	%
Democratic	Ralph C. Dills (incumbent)	95,753	50.5
Republican	David Barrett Cohen	81,193	42.8
Peace and Freedom	Cindy V. Henderson	6,698	3.5
Libertarian	Neal Arvid Donner	6,038	3.2
Total votes		189,682	100.0
Democratic hold			

=== 1990 ===
1990 California State Senate 28th district election
Party	Candidate	Votes	%
Democratic	Diane Watson (incumbent)	102,562	85.2
Peace and Freedom	Ivan William Kasinoff	17,836	14.8
Total votes		120,398	100.0
Democratic hold			

== See also ==
- California State Senate
- California State Senate districts
- Districts in California
