= Artesia Cemetery =

Cemetery in California

- Location within the Los Angeles metropolitan area Location within California Location within the United States

Details
- Established: 1875
- Location: 11142 Artesia Blvd, Cerritos, CA 90703
- Coordinates: 33.8716°N 118.0959°W
- Owned by: Artesia Cemetery District
- Size: 14 acres (5.7 ha)
- No. of graves: 8,200
- No. of interments: 7,500
- Website: www.artesiacemetery.com
- Find a Grave: Artesia Cemetery

Artesia Cemetery is a historic 14 acres (5.7 ha) cemetery in Cerritos, California. Opposite Gahr High School, it is one of the oldest cemeteries in Los Angeles County, with burials as far back as the 1860s. The cemetery is maintained by the Artesia Historical Society and was the only local cemetery for a while.

== History ==
The cemetery has been used since the 1860s and was established in 1875. The oldest surviving grave is from 1882. The cemetery was the only local cemetery in the area, serving the cities of Cerritos, Artesia, Hawaiian Gardens, and parts Lakewood, Long Beach, and Norwalk. It contained over forty graves of American Civil War veterans. It was privately owned until it was consolidated, with some other private cemeteries, into the Artesia Cemetery District on September 24, 1928, by the Los Angeles County Board of Supervisors.

By 2016, the cemetery had fallen into disrepair, infested with gophers and weeds. Member of the Los Angeles County Board of Supervisors Janice Hahn led an initiative to clean it up, with former California State Senate member Tony Mendoza being appointed as the general manager in 2019. A grand re-opening occurred on September 28.
