= California's 36th senatorial district =

American legislative district

California's 36th State Senate district
Current senator
Tony Strickland; R–Huntington Beach
- Population (2010) • Voting age • Citizen voting age: 938,083; 708,785; 603,622
- Demographics: 63.43% White; 2.48% Black; 23.75% Latino; 8.33% Asian; 0.64% Native American; 0.55% Hawaiian/Pacific Islander; 0.27% other; 0.54% remainder of multiracial
- Registered voters: 637,782
- Registration: 37.11% Republican; 33.93% Democratic; 22.61% No party preference

California's 36th senatorial district is one of 40 California State Senate districts. It is currently represented by Tony Strickland of Huntington Beach.

== District profile ==
The district includes most of coastal Orange County, including Seal Beach, Huntington Beach, Newport Beach, Emerald Bay, Laguna Beach, and Dana Point; San Clemente; the Little Saigon area of northwestern Orange County, including Garden Grove, Westminster, Fountain Valley, Midway City, Stanton, Cypress, La Palma, Rossmoor, and Los Alamitos; and Artesia, Cerritos, and Hawaiian Gardens in southeastern Los Angeles County.

== Election results from statewide races ==
Year	Office	Results
2024	President	Trump 50.6 – 46.6%
2022	Governor	Dahle 54.3 – 45.7%
2022	Senator	Meuser 53.7 – 46.3%
2021	Recall	Yes 50.3 – 49.7%
2020	President	Biden 53.2 – 44.6%
2018	Governor	Cox 51.2 – 48.8%
2018	Senator	Feinstein 53.8 – 46.2%
2016	President	Clinton 48.1 – 45.8%
2016	Senator	Harris 58.8 – 41.2%
2014	Governor	Kashkari 57.5 – 42.5%
2012	President	Romney 54.8 – 43.2%
2012	Senator	Emken 55.8 – 44.2%

== List of senators representing the district ==
Due to redistricting, the 36th district has been moved around different parts of the state. The current iteration resulted from the 2021 redistricting by the California Citizens Redistricting Commission.

Senators	Party	Years served	Electoral history	Counties represented
John Roth (Tulare)	Democratic	January 3, 1887 – January 5, 1891	Elected in 1886. [data missing]	Inyo, Kern, Tulare
George S. Berry (Visalia)	Democratic	January 5, 1891 – January 7, 1895	Elected in 1890. Redistricted to the 32nd and 34th districts.	Inyo, Kern, Tulare
Cyrus M. Simpson (Pasadena)	Republican	January 7, 1895 – January 5, 1903	Elected in 1894. Re-elected in 1898. [data missing]	Los Angeles
Benjamin W. Hahn (Long Beach)	Republican	January 5, 1903 – January 7, 1907	Elected in 1902. Lost re-election.	Los Angeles
Charles W. Bell (Pasadena)	Nonpatisan	January 7, 1907 – January 6, 1913	Elected in 1906. Re-elected in 1910. Retired to become a member of the U.S. House of Representatives.	Los Angeles
Charles W. Bell (Pasadena)	Republican	January 7, 1907 – January 6, 1913	Elected in 1906. Re-elected in 1910. Retired to become a member of the U.S. House of Representatives.	Los Angeles
William J. Carr (Pasadena)	Independent	January 6, 1913 – January 8, 1923	Elected in 1912. Re-elected in 1914. Re-elected in 1918. [data missing]	Los Angeles
William J. Carr (Pasadena)	Progressive	January 6, 1913 – January 8, 1923	Elected in 1912. Re-elected in 1914. Re-elected in 1918. [data missing]	Los Angeles
William J. Carr (Pasadena)	Republican	January 6, 1913 – January 8, 1923	Elected in 1912. Re-elected in 1914. Re-elected in 1918. [data missing]	Los Angeles
A. Burlingame Johnson (Pasadena)	Republican	January 8, 1923 – January 3, 1927	Elected in 1922. [data missing]	Los Angeles
Frank C. Weller (Los Angeles)	Republican	January 3, 1927 – January 5, 1931	Elected in 1926. [data missing]	Los Angeles
Ralph E. Swing (Upland)	Republican	January 5, 1931 – January 8, 1951	Redistricted from the 30th district and re-elected in 1930. Re-elected in 1934. Re-elected in 1938. Re-elected in 1942. Re-elected in 1946. [data missing]	San Bernardino
James E. Cunningham (San Bernardino)	Republican	January 8, 1951 – September 10, 1957	Elected in 1850. Re-elected in 1854. Resigned.	San Bernardino
Vacant		September 10, 1957 – December 31, 1957		San Bernardino
Raymond H. Gregory (San Bernardino)	Republican	December 31, 1957 – January 5, 1959	Elected to finish Cunningham's term. Lost re-election.	San Bernardino
Stanford C. Shaw (Etiwanda)	Democratic	January 5, 1959 – January 7, 1963	Elected in 1958. [data missing]	San Bernardino
Eugene G. Nisbet (Upland)	Democratic	January 7, 1963 – January 2, 1967	Elected in 1962. Redistricted to the 20th district and lost re-election.	San Bernardino
Gordon Cologne (Indio)	Republican	January 2, 1967 – March 2, 1972	Redistricted from the 37th district and re-elected in 1966. Re-elected in 1970. Resigned to become a Justice of the California Courts of Appeal.	Riverside, San Bernardino
Vacant		March 2, 1972 – June 15, 1972		Riverside, San Bernardino
W. Craig Biddle (Riverside)	Republican	June 15, 1972 – November 30, 1974	Elected to finish Cologne's term. Redistricted to the 34th district and lost re-election.	Riverside, San Bernardino
Dennis Carpenter (Newport Beach)	Republican	December 2, 1974 – November 30, 1978	Redistricted from the 34th district and re-elected in 1974. [data missing]	Orange, San Diego
John G. Schmitz (Santa Ana)	Republican	December 4, 1978 – November 30, 1982	Elected in 1978. Retired to run for U.S. Senate.	Orange, San Diego
Robert B. Presley (Riverside)	Democratic	December 6, 1982 – November 30, 1994	Redistricted from the 34th district and re-elected in 1982. Re-elected in 1986. Re-elected in 1990. Retired to run for Board of Equalization.	Riverside
Ray Haynes (Riverside)	Republican	December 5, 1994 – November 30, 2002	Elected in 1994. Re-elected in 1998. Term-limited and ran for State Assembly.	(2001–2011); Riverside, San Diego
Dennis Hollingsworth (Murrieta)	Republican	December 2, 2002 – November 30, 2010	Elected in 2002. Re-elected in 2006. Term-limited and retired.	(2001–2011); Riverside, San Diego
Joel Anderson (Alpine)	Republican	December 6, 2010 – November 30, 2014	Elected in 2010. Redistricted to the 38th district.	(2001–2011); Riverside, San Diego
Patricia Bates (Laguna Niguel)	Republican	December 1, 2014 – November 30, 2022	Elected in 2014. Re-elected in 2018. Term-limited and retired.	(2011–2021); Orange, San Diego
Janet Nguyen (Huntington Beach)	Republican	December 7, 2022 – November 30, 2024	Elected in 2022. Resigned after election to the Orange County Board of Supervisors.	(2021–2031); Los Angeles, Orange
Vacant		November 30, 2024 – March 11, 2025		(2021–2031); Los Angeles, Orange
Tony Strickland (Huntington Beach)	Republican	March 11, 2025 – present	Elected to finish Nguyen's term. Lost re-election.	(2021–2031); Los Angeles, Orange

== Election results (1990-present) ==
=== 2025 (special) ===
2025 California State Senate 36th district special election Vacancy resulting from the resignation of Janet Nguyen
Party	Candidate	Votes	%
Republican	Tony Strickland	81,133	51.3
Democratic	Jimmy D. Pham	43,730	27.7
Democratic	John Briscoe	22,647	14.3
Republican	Julie Diep	10,588	6.7
Total votes		158,098	100.0
Republican hold			

=== 2022 ===
2022 California State Senate 36th district election
Primary election
Party	Candidate	Votes	%
Republican	Janet Nguyen	125,053	56.7
Democratic	Kim Carr	95,655	43.3
Total votes		220,708	100.0
General election
Republican	Janet Nguyen	196,488	56.9
Democratic	Kim Carr	149,114	43.1
Total votes		345,602	100.0
Republican hold			

=== 2018 ===
2018 California State Senate 36th district election
Primary election
Party	Candidate	Votes	%
Republican	Patricia Bates (incumbent)	124,966	54.4
Democratic	Marggie Castellano	104,791	45.6
Total votes		229,757	100.0
General election
Republican	Patricia Bates (incumbent)	203,607	51.5
Democratic	Marggie Castellano	191,392	48.5
Total votes		394,999	100.0
Republican hold			

=== 2014 ===
2014 California State Senate 36th district election
Primary election
Party	Candidate	Votes	%
Republican	Patricia Bates	88,171	99.1
Democratic	Gary Kephart (write-in)	756	0.9
Total votes		88,927	100.0
General election
Republican	Patricia Bates	140,610	65.7
Democratic	Gary Kephart	73,539	34.3
Total votes		214,149	100.0
Republican hold			

=== 2010 ===
2010 California State Senate 36th district election
Party	Candidate	Votes	%
Republican	Joel Anderson	193,573	63.2
Democratic	Paul Clay	101,112	33.0
Libertarian	Michael S. Metti	11,737	3.8
Total votes		306,422	100.0
Republican hold			

=== 2006 ===
2006 California State Senate 36th district election
Party	Candidate	Votes	%
Republican	Dennis Hollingsworth (incumbent)	164,025	63.4
Democratic	Mark Hanson	85,706	33.1
Libertarian	Joseph Shea	9,001	3.5
Total votes		258,732	100.0
Republican hold			

=== 2002 ===
2002 California State Senate 36th district election
Party	Candidate	Votes	%
Republican	Dennis Hollingsworth	151,856	69.5
Democratic	Adrienne Westall	53,280	24.4
Libertarian	Michael S. Metti	13,258	6.1
Total votes		218,394	100.0
Republican hold			

=== 1998 ===
1998 California State Senate 36th district election
Party	Candidate	Votes	%
Republican	Ray Haynes (incumbent)	127,531	60.1
Democratic	George M. Swift	84,683	39.9
Total votes		212,214	100.0
Republican hold			

=== 1994 ===
1994 California State Senate 36th district election
Party	Candidate	Votes	%
Republican	Ray Haynes	121,263	55.0
Democratic	Kay Ceniceros	91,580	41.5
Libertarian	David R. Sarosi	7,637	3.5
Total votes		220,480	100.0
Republican gain from Democratic			

=== 1990 ===
1990 California State Senate 36th district election
Party	Candidate	Votes	%
Democratic	Robert B. Presley (incumbent)	112,560	53.6
Republican	Ray Haynes	97,558	46.4
Total votes		210,118	100.0
Democratic hold			

== See also ==
- California State Senate
- California State Senate districts
- Districts in California
