= California's 40th senatorial district =

American legislative district

California's 40th State Senate district
Current senator
Brian Jones; R–Santee
- Population (2010) • Voting age • Citizen voting age: 935,055; 671,129; 466,879
- Demographics: 16.39% White; 7.27% Black; 62.28% Latino; 12.07% Asian; 0.57% Native American; 0.53% Hawaiian/Pacific Islander; 0.19% other; 0.70% remainder of multiracial
- Registered voters: 486,524
- Registration: 46.49% Democratic; 19.15% Republican; 28.31% No party preference

California's 40th senatorial district is one of 40 California State Senate districts. It is currently represented by Republican Brian Jones of Santee.

== District profile ==
The district encompasses much of inland San Diego County, including Santee, Poway, Alpine, Pine Valley, Ramona, San Marcos, Escondido, Hidden Meadows, Valley Center, Pauma Valley, and Fallbrook, as well as the northeastern parts of the city of San Diego proper.

== Election results from statewide races ==
Year	Office	Results
2021	Recall	No 63.0 - 37.0%
2021	Recall	Elder 42.6 - 12.4%
2020	President	Biden 65.1 – 32.8%
2018	Governor	Newsom 64.5 – 35.5%
2018	Senator	de Leon 50.1 – 49.9%
2016	President	Clinton 68.6 – 26.2%
2016	Senator	Sanchez 53.9 – 46.1%
2014	Governor	Brown 62.2 – 37.8%
2012	President	Obama 65.1 – 33.3%
2012	Senator	Feinstein 66.4 – 33.6%

Election results from statewide races
Year	Office	Results
2000	President	Gore 52.6 - 43.4%
2000	Senator	Feinstein 58.5 - 33.5%
1998	Governor	Davis 57.2 - 38.6%
1998	Senator	Boxer 53.0 - 42.2%
1996	President	Clinton 52.6 - 38.4%
1994	Governor	Wilson 58.9 - 37.6%
1994	Senator	Huffington 49.8 - 39.4%
1992	President	Clinton 42.7 - 32.7%
1992	Senator	Boxer 45.3 - 43.2%
1992	Senator	Feinstein 49.8 - 39.6%

== List of senators representing the district ==
Due to redistricting, the 40th district has been moved around different parts of the state. The current iteration resulted from the 2021 redistricting by the California Citizens Redistricting Commission.

Senators	Party	Years served	Electoral history	Counties represented
William W. Bowers (San Diego)	Republican	January 3, 1887 – January 5, 1891	Elected in 1886. Retired to run for U.S. House of Representatives.	San Bernardino, San Diego
Henry M. Streeter (Riverside)	Republican	January 5, 1891 – January 7, 1895	Elected in 1890. [data missing]	San Bernardino, San Diego
D. L. Withington (San Diego)	Republican	January 7, 1895 – January 2, 1899	Elected in 1894. [data missing]	San Diego
A. E. Nutt (San Diego)	Republican	January 2, 1899 – January 5, 1903	Elected in 1898. [data missing]	San Diego
Martin L. Ward (San Diego)	Republican	January 5, 1903 – January 7, 1907	Elected in 1902. [data missing]	San Diego
Leroy A. Wright (San Diego)	Republican	January 7, 1907 – January 4, 1915	Elected in 1906. Re-elected in 1910. [data missing]	San Diego
Edgar A. Luce (San Diego)	Progressive	January 4, 1915 – January 6, 1919	Elected in 1914. [data missing]	San Diego
Ed P. Sample (San Diego)	Republican	January 6, 1919 – January 3, 1927	Elected in 1918. Re-elected in 1922. [data missing]	San Diego
Edwin A. Mueller (El Cajon)	Republican	January 3, 1927 – January 5, 1931	Elected in 1926. [data missing]	San Diego
William E. Harper (San Diego)	Republican	January 5, 1931 – January 7, 1935	Elected in 1930. [data missing]	San Diego
Ed Fletcher (San Diego)	Republican	January 7, 1935 – January 6, 1947	Elected in 1934. Re-elected in 1938. Retired to run for U.S. House of Representatives.	San Diego
Fred H. Kraft (San Diego)	Republican	January 6, 1947 – January 5, 1959	Elected in 1946. Re-elected in 1950. Re-elected in 1954. Lost re-election.	San Diego
Hugo M. Fisher (San Diego)	Democratic	January 5, 1959 – January 7, 1963	Elected in 1958. Lost re-election.	San Diego
Jack Schrade (El Cajon)	Republican	January 7, 1963 – January 2, 1967	Elected in 1962. Redistricted to the 39th district.	San Diego
James R. Mills (San Diego)	Democratic	January 2, 1967 – November 30, 1982	Elected in 1966. Re-elected in 1970. Re-elected in 1974. Re-elected in 1978. Term-limited and retired.	Imperial, San Diego
Wadie P. Deddeh (San Diego)	Democratic	December 6, 1982 – August 17, 1993	Elected in 1982. Re-elected in 1986. Re-elected in 1990. Resigned.	San Diego
Vacant		August 17, 1993 – January 10, 1994		San Diego
Stephen Peace (San Diego)	Democratic	January 10, 1994 – November 30, 2002	Elected to finish Deddeh's term. Re-elected in 1994. Re-elected in 1998. Term-limited and retired.	San Diego
Denise M. Ducheny (San Diego)	Democratic	December 2, 2002 – November 30, 2010	Elected in 2002. Re-elected in 2006. Term-limited and retired.	Imperial, Riverside, San Diego
Juan Vargas (San Diego)	Democratic	December 6, 2010 – January 2, 2013	Elected in 2010. Resigned after election to the U.S. House of Representatives.	Imperial, Riverside, San Diego
Vacant		January 2, 2013 – March 21, 2013		Imperial, Riverside, San Diego
Ben Hueso (San Diego)	Democratic	March 21, 2013 – November 30, 2022	Re-elected in 2014. Re-elected in 2018. Term-limited and retired.	
Ben Hueso (San Diego)	Democratic	March 21, 2013 – November 30, 2022	Re-elected in 2014. Re-elected in 2018. Term-limited and retired.	Imperial, San Diego
Brian Jones (Santee)	Republican	December 5, 2022 – present	Redistricted from the 38th district and re-elected in 2022. Term-limited and retiring at end of term.	San Diego

== Election results (1990-present) ==
=== 2022 ===
2022 California State Senate 40th district election
Primary election
Party	Candidate	Votes	%
Republican	Brian Jones (incumbent)	113,400	54.4
Democratic	Joseph C. Rocha	94,960	45.6
Total votes		208,360	100.0
General election
Republican	Brian Jones (incumbent)	170,109	53.1
Democratic	Joseph C. Rocha	149,948	46.9
Total votes		320,057	100.0
Republican gain from Democratic			

=== 2018 ===
2018 California State Senate 40th district election
Primary election
Party	Candidate	Votes	%
Democratic	Ben Hueso (incumbent)	70,649	60.1
Republican	Luis R. Vargas	46,850	39.9
Total votes		117,499	100.0
General election
Democratic	Ben Hueso (incumbent)	152,896	65.9
Republican	Luis R. Vargas	79,207	34.1
Total votes		232,103	100.0
Democratic hold			

=== 2014 ===
2014 California State Senate 40th district election
Primary election
Party	Candidate	Votes	%
Democratic	Ben Hueso (incumbent)	45,249	71.9
Democratic	Rafael Estrada	17,547	27.9
Republican	Michael Diaz (write-in)	188	0.3
Total votes		62,984	100.0
General election
Democratic	Ben Hueso (incumbent)	58,880	54.9
Democratic	Rafael Estrada	48,397	45.1
Total votes		107,277	100.0
Democratic hold			

=== 2013 (special) ===
2013 California State Senate 40th district special election Vacancy resulting from the resignation of Juan Vargas
Primary election
Party	Candidate	Votes	%
Democratic	Ben Hueso	29,367	53.1
Republican	Hector Raul Gastelum	11,951	21.6
Republican	Xanthi Gionis	8,243	14.9
Democratic	Anna Nevenic	5,740	10.4
Democratic	Craig Fiegener (write-in)	39	0.1
Democratic	Rafael Estrada (write-in)	20	0.0
Total votes		55,360	100.0
Democratic hold			

=== 2010 ===
2010 California State Senate 40th district election
Party	Candidate	Votes	%
Democratic	Juan Vargas	101,767	59.5
Republican	Brian Hendry	69,417	40.5
Total votes		171,184	100.0
Democratic hold			

=== 2006 ===
2006 California State Senate 40th district election
Party	Candidate	Votes	%
Democratic	Denise Moreno Ducheny (incumbent)	84,787	62.2
Republican	David K. Walden	47,601	34.9
Libertarian	Jesse Thomas	3,982	2.9
Total votes		136,370	100.0
Democratic hold			

=== 2002 ===
2002 California State Senate 40th district election
Party	Candidate	Votes	%
Democratic	Denise Moreno Ducheny	66,405	56.4
Republican	Michael S. Giorgino	47,087	39.9
Libertarian	Felix Jeremiah Miranda	4,362	3.7
Total votes		117,854	100.0
Democratic hold			

=== 1998 ===
1998 California State Senate 40th district election
Party	Candidate	Votes	%
Democratic	Steve Peace (incumbent)	103,669	66.3
Republican	Bob Divine	47,490	30.4
Libertarian	David N. Graham	5,192	3.3
Total votes		156,351	100.0
Democratic hold			

=== 1994 ===
1994 California State Senate 40th district election
Party	Candidate	Votes	%
Democratic	Steve Peace (incumbent)	77,211	48.0
Republican	Joe Ghougassian	72,410	45.1
Peace and Freedom	Elena Smith Pelayo	6,347	3.9
Libertarian	Ben Gibbs	4,758	3.0
Total votes		160,726	100.0
Democratic hold			

=== 1993 (special) ===
1993 California State Senate 40th district special election Vacancy resulting from the resignation of Wadie P. Deddeh
Primary election
Party	Candidate	Votes	%
Democratic	Stephen Peace	41,190	48.1
Republican	Joe Ghougassian	20,784	24.3
Democratic	Joe E. Warren	7,154	8.3
Republican	Muriel Watson	6,922	8.1
Democratic	Lottle S. Rogers	4,826	5.6
Republican	Daniel L. Clark	4,805	5.6
Total votes		85,681	100.0
General election
Democratic	Stephen Peace	33,302	52.8
Republican	Joe Ghougassian	29,781	47.2
Total votes		63,083	100.0
Democratic hold			

=== 1990 ===
1990 California State Senate 40th district election
Party	Candidate	Votes	%
Democratic	Wadie P. Deddeh (incumbent)	72,771	56.6
Republican	Muriel C. Watson	47,058	36.6
Peace and Freedom	Roger Bruce Batchelder	4,683	3.6
Libertarian	Eric Moths	3,987	3.1
Total votes		160,726	100.0
Democratic hold			

== See also ==
- California State Senate
- California State Senate districts
- Districts in California
