= California's 34th senatorial district =

American legislative district

California's 34th State Senate district
Current senator
Tom Umberg; D–Santa Ana
- Population (2010) • Voting age • Citizen voting age: 927,893; 688,872; 491,287
- Demographics: 29.00% White; 1.40% Black; 46.85% Latino; 21.36% Asian; 0.40% Native American; 0.44% Hawaiian/Pacific Islander; 0.19% other; 0.37% remainder of multiracial
- Registered voters: 441,884
- Registration: 41.48% Democratic; 29.38% Republican; 24.36% No party preference

California's 34th senatorial district is one of 40 California State Senate districts. It is currently represented by Democrat Tom Umberg of Santa Ana.

== District profile ==
The district encompasses northern Orange County, including most of Santa Ana, Anaheim, Placentia, Fullerton, Buena Park, La Habra, and the west side of Orange, along with the unincorporated community of South Whittier in Los Angeles County.

== Election results from statewide races ==
Year	Office	Results
2021	Recall	No 55.2 – 44.8%
2020	President	Biden 55.7 – 42.3%
2018	Governor	Newsom 55.5 - 44.5%
2018	Senator	Feinstein 54.2 - 45.8%
2016	President	Clinton 58.5 – 35.8%
2016	Senator	Sanchez 52.6 – 47.4%
2014	Governor	Brown 52.5 – 47.5%
2012	President	Obama 53.3 – 44.4%
2012	Senator	Feinstein 55.3 – 44.7%

Election results from statewide races
Year	Office	Results
2000	President	Gore 51.4 - 45.0%
2000	Senator	Feinstein 53.0 - 38.1%
1998	Governor	Davis 54.1 - 41.5%
1998	Senator	Boxer 47.8 - 46.5%
1996	President	Clinton 47.2 - 42.1%
1994	Governor	Wilson 61.7 - 32.7%
1994	Senator	Huffington 55.4 - 32.5%
1992	President	Bush 39.9 - 36.2%
1992	Senator	Herschensohn 53.9 - 35.6%
1992	Senator	Seymour 46.1 - 42.2%

== List of senators representing the district ==
Due to redistricting, the 34th district has been moved around different parts of the state. The current iteration resulted from the 2021 redistricting by the California Citizens Redistricting Commission.

Senators	Party	Years served	Electoral history	Counties represented
George G. Goucher (Fresno)	Democratic	January 3, 1887 – January 2, 1893	Elected in 1886. Re-elected in 1890. Redistricted to the 16th district.	Alpine, Fresno, Mariposa, Mono
George S. Berry (Lindsay)	Democratic	January 2, 1893 – January 7, 1895	Redistricted from the 16th district and re-elected in 1892. [data missing]	Inyo, Kern, Tulare
Sylvester C. Smith (Bakersfield)	Republican	January 7, 1895 – January 5, 1903	Elected in 1894. Re-elected in 1898. Retired to run for U.S. House of Representatives.	Kern, San Luis Obispo
William H. Savage (San Pedro)	Republican	January 5, 1903 – January 2, 1911	Elected in 1902. Re-elected in 1906. [data missing]	Los Angeles
Lee C. Gates (Los Angeles)	Republican	January 2, 1911 – January 4, 1915	Elected in 1910. [data missing]	Los Angeles
Henry S. Benedict (Los Angeles)	Republican	January 4, 1915 – November 7, 1916	Elected in 1914. Resigned when elected to the U.S. House of Representatives.	Los Angeles
Vacant		November 7, 1916 – January 6, 1919		Los Angeles
Charles W. Lyon (Los Angeles)	Republican	January 6, 1919 – January 5, 1931	Elected in 1918. Re-elected in 1922. Re-elected in 1926. Lost re-election.	Los Angeles
James I. Wagy (Bakersfield)	Republican	January 5, 1931 – January 4, 1943	Redistricted from the 32nd district and re-elected in 1930. Re-elected in 1934. Re-elected in 1938. [data missing]	Kern
Jess R. Dorsey (Bakersfield)	Republican	January 4, 1943 – September 27, 1958	Elected in 1942. Re-elected in 1946. Re-elected in 1950. Re-elected in 1954. Died and posthumously lost re-election.	Kern
Vacant		September 27, 1958 – January 5, 1959		Kern
Walter W. Stiern (Bakersfield)	Democratic	January 5, 1959 – January 2, 1967	Elected in 1958. Re-elected in 1962. Redistricted to the 18th district.	Kern
John G. Schmitz (Santa Ana)	Republican	January 2, 1967 – June 30, 1970	Redistricted from the 35th district and re-elected in 1966. Resigned when elected to the U.S. House of Representatives.	Orange
Vacant		June 30, 1970 – August 21, 1970		Orange
Dennis Carpenter (Newport Beach)	Republican	August 21, 1970 – November 30, 1974	Elected to finish Schmitz's term. Re-elected in 1970. Redistricted to the 36th district.	Orange
Robert B. Presley (Riverside)	Democratic	December 2, 1974 – November 30, 1982	Elected in 1974. Re-elected in 1978. Re-elected in 1982. Re-elected in 1986. Redistricted to the 36th district.	Riverside, San Bernadrino
Ruben Ayala (Chino)	Democratic	December 6, 1982 – November 30, 1994	Elected in 1982. Re-elected in 1986. Re-elected in 1990. Redistricted to the 32nd district.	Los Angeles, San Bernadrino
Rob Hurtt (Garden Grove)	Republican	December 5, 1994 – November 30, 1998	Redistricted from the 32nd district and re-elected in 1994. Lost re-election.	Orange
Joe Dunn (Santa Ana)	Democratic	December 7, 1998 – November 4, 2006	Elected in 1998. Re-elected in 2002. Retired to run for State Controller.	Orange
Vacant		November 4, 2006 – December 4, 2006		Orange
Lou Correa (Santa Ana)	Democratic	December 4, 2006 – November 30, 2014	Elected in 2006. Re-elected in 2010. Retired to run for Orange County Board of Supervisors.	Orange
Janet Nguyen (Huntington Beach)	Republican	December 1, 2014 – November 30, 2018	Elected in 2014. Lost re-election.	Los Angeles, Orange
Tom Umberg (Santa Ana)	Democratic	December 3, 2018 – present	Elected in 2018. Re-elected in 2022. Term-limited and retiring at end of term.	Los Angeles, Orange

== Election results (1990-present) ==
=== 2022 ===
2022 California State Senate 34th district election
Primary election
Party	Candidate	Votes	%
Democratic	Tom Umberg (incumbent)	55,525	58.3
Republican	Rhonda Shader	39,728	41.7
Total votes		95,253	100.0
General election
Democratic	Tom Umberg (incumbent)	96,419	58.8
Republican	Rhonda Shader	67,633	41.2
Total votes		164,052	100.0
Democratic hold			

=== 2018 ===
2018 California State Senate 34th district election
Primary election
Party	Candidate	Votes	%
Republican	Janet Nguyen (incumbent)	82,874	58.3
Democratic	Tom Umberg	37,360	26.3
Democratic	Jestin L. Samson	13,231	9.3
Democratic	Akash A. Hawkins	8,746	6.1
Total votes		142,211	100.0
General election
Democratic	Tom Umberg	135,062	50.6
Republican	Janet Nguyen (incumbent)	131,973	49.4
Total votes		267,035	100.0
Democratic gain from Republican			

=== 2014 ===
2014 California State Senate 34th district election
Primary election
Party	Candidate	Votes	%
Republican	Janet Nguyen	46,445	52.0
Democratic	Jose Solorio	29,793	33.3
Republican	Long Pham	13,102	14.7
Total votes		89,340	100.0
General election
Republican	Janet Nguyen	95,792	58.1
Democratic	Jose Solorio	69,220	41.9
Total votes		165,012	100.0
Republican gain from Democratic			

=== 2010 ===
2010 California State Senate 34th district election
Party	Candidate	Votes	%
Democratic	Lou Correa (incumbent)	88,892	65.8
Republican	Lucille Kring	46,377	34.2
Total votes		135,269	100.0
Democratic hold			

=== 2006 ===
2006 California State Senate 34th district election
Party	Candidate	Votes	%
Democratic	Lou Correa	56,534	50.2
Republican	Lynn Daucher	55,142	49.0
Independent	Otto Bade (write-in)	911	0.8
Total votes		112,587	100.0
Democratic hold			

=== 2002 ===
2002 California State Senate 34th district election
Party	Candidate	Votes	%
Democratic	Joe Dunn (incumbent)	63,485	61.9
Republican	Araceli Gonzalez	39,025	38.1
Total votes		102,510	100.0
Democratic hold			

=== 1998 ===
1998 California State Senate 34th district election
Party	Candidate	Votes	%
Democratic	Joe Dunn	62,063	51.3
Republican	Rob Hurtt (incumbent)	58,933	48.7
Total votes		120,996	100.0
Democratic gain from Republican			

=== 1994 ===
1994 California State Senate 34th district election
Party	Candidate	Votes	%
Republican	Rob Hurtt (incumbent)	70,404	57.3
Democratic	Donna Chessen	45,027	36.6
Libertarian	Thomas E. Reimer	7,530	6.1
Total votes		115,431	100.0
Republican gain from Democratic			

=== 1990 ===
1990 California State Senate 34th district election
Party	Candidate	Votes	%
Democratic	Ruben Ayala (incumbent)	80,949	51.8
Republican	Charles W. Bader	75,352	48.2
Total votes		156,301	100.0
Democratic hold			

== See also ==
- California State Senate
- California State Senate districts
- Districts in California
