= California's 38th senatorial district =

American legislative district

California's 38th State Senate district
Current senator
Catherine Blakespear; D–Encinitas
- Population (2020) • Voting age • Citizen voting age: 1,006,438; 696,724; 559,186
- Demographics: 56.6% White; 3.5% Black; 30.2% Latino; 8.9% Asian; 1.5% Native American; 0.4% Hawaiian/Pacific Islander; 0.25% other; 0.54% remainder of multiracial
- Registered voters: 561,514
- Registration: 36.85% Republican; 32.40% Democratic; 24.44% No party preference

California's 38th senatorial district is one of 40 California State Senate districts. It is currently represented by Democrat Catherine Blakespear of Encinitas.

== District profile ==
The district encompasses the coastal North County region of San Diego County, including the communities of La Jolla, Del Mar, Solana Beach, Cardiff, Rancho Santa Fe, Encinitas, Carlsbad, Vista, Oceanside, San Luis Rey, and Camp Pendleton Marine Corps Base; along with the southern edge of Orange County, including San Clemente, San Juan Capistrano, Ladera Ranch, Las Flores, and Rancho Santa Margarita.

== Election results from statewide races ==
Year	Office	Results
2024	President	Harris 54.9 – 45.1%
2022	Governor	Newsom 52.6 – 47.4%
2022	Senator	Padilla 54.4 – 45.6%
2020	President	Biden 49.5 – 48.1%
2018	Governor	Cox 55.0 – 45.0%
2018	Senator	Feinstein 50.3 – 49.7%
2016	President	Trump 49.7 – 44.4%
2016	Senator	Harris 56.5 – 43.5%
2014	Governor	Kashkari 60.1 – 39.9%
2012	President	Romney 56.7 – 41.3%
2012	Senator	Emken 56.8 – 43.2%

== List of senators representing the district ==
Due to redistricting, the 38th district has been moved around different parts of the state. The current iteration resulted from the 2021 redistricting by the California Citizens Redistricting Commission.

Senators	Party	Years served	Electoral history	Counties represented
Stephen M. White (Los Angeles)	Democratic	January 3, 1887 – January 5, 1891	Elected in 1886. [data missing]	Los Angeles
R. B. Carpenter (Los Angeles)	Republican	January 5, 1891 – January 2, 1893	Elected in 1890. Redistricted to the 36th district.	Los Angeles, Orange
Vacant		January 2, 1893 – January 7, 1895	Redistricting for the 1892 election did not require incumbents to run in their own districts.	Los Angeles, Orange
Samuel N. Androus (Pomona)	Republican	January 7, 1895 – January 2, 1899	Elected in 1894. [data missing]	Los Angeles
Alvan T. Currier (Los Angeles)	Republican	January 2, 1899 – January 5, 1903	Elected in 1898. [data missing]	Los Angeles
Cornelius W. Pendleton (Los Angeles)	Republican	January 5, 1903 – January 7, 1907	Elected in 1902. [data missing]	Los Angeles
H. S. G. McCartney (Los Angeles)	Republican	January 7, 1907 – January 2, 1911	Elected in 1906. [data missing]	Los Angeles
Leslie R. Hewitt (Los Angeles)	Republican	January 2, 1911 – January 4, 1915	Elected in 1910. [data missing]	Los Angeles
John W. Ballard (Santa Ana)	Republican	January 4, 1915 – January 6, 1919	Elected in 1914. [data missing]	Los Angeles
Henry H. Yonkin (Los Angeles)	Republican	January 6, 1919 – January 8, 1923	Elected in 1918. [data missing]	Los Angeles
Charles H. V. Lewis (Los Angeles)	Republican	January 8, 1923 – January 3, 1927	Elected in 1922. [data missing]	Los Angeles
J. W. McKinley (Los Angeles)	Republican	January 3, 1927 – January 7, 1935	Elected in 1926. Re-elected in 1930. [data missing]	Los Angeles
Culbert Olson (Los Angeles)	Democratic	January 7, 1935 – January 2, 1939	Elected in 1934. Retired to run for Governor of California.	Los Angeles
Robert W. Kenny (Los Angeles)	Democratic	January 2, 1939 – January 4, 1943	Elected in 1938. Retired to run for Attorney General of California.	Los Angeles
Jack Tenney (Los Angeles)	Democratic	January 4, 1943 – January 3, 1955	Elected in 1942. Switched parties in 1944. Re-elected in 1946. Re-elected in 1950. Lost renomination.	Los Angeles
Jack Tenney (Los Angeles)	Republican	January 4, 1943 – January 3, 1955	Elected in 1942. Switched parties in 1944. Re-elected in 1946. Re-elected in 1950. Lost renomination.	Los Angeles
Richard B. Richards (Los Angeles)	Democratic	January 3, 1955 – January 7, 1963	Elected in 1954. Re-elected in 1958. Retired to run for U.S. Senate.	Los Angeles
Thomas M. Rees (Los Angeles)	Democratic	January 7, 1963 – December 15, 1965	Elected in 1962. Resigned after election to the U.S. House of Representatives.	Los Angeles
Vacant		December 15, 1965 – January 2, 1967		Los Angeles
Clair Burgener (Rancho Santa Fe)	Republican	January 2, 1967 – January 3, 1973	Elected in 1966. Re-elected in 1970. Retired to run for U.S. House of Representatives.	San Diego
Vacant		January 3, 1973 – March 12, 1973		San Diego
John Stull (Escondido)	Republican	March 12, 1973 – November 30, 1978	Elected to finish vacant term. Re-elected in 1974. [data missing]	Imperial, Riverside, San Diego
William A. Craven (Oceanside)	Republican	December 4, 1978 – November 30, 1998	Elected in 1978. Re-elected in 1982. Re-elected in 1986. Re-elected in 1990. Re-elected in 1994. Term-limited and retired.	Imperial, Riverside, San Diego
William A. Craven (Oceanside)	Republican	December 4, 1978 – November 30, 1998	Elected in 1978. Re-elected in 1982. Re-elected in 1986. Re-elected in 1990. Re-elected in 1994. Term-limited and retired.	San Diego
Bill Morrow (Oceanside)	Republican	December 7, 1998 – November 30, 2006	Elected in 1998. Re-elected in 2002. Term-limited and retired.	Orange, San Diego
Mark Wyland (Escondido)	Republican	December 4, 2006 – November 30, 2014	Elected in 2006. Re-elected in 2010. Term-limited and retired.	Orange, San Diego
Joel Anderson (Alpine)	Republican	December 1, 2014 – November 30, 2018	Redistricted from the 36th district and re-elected in 2014. Term-limited and retired.	San Diego
Brian Jones (Santee)	Republican	December 3, 2018 – November 30, 2022	Elected in 2018. Redistricted to the 40th district.	San Diego
Catherine Blakespear (Encinitas)	Democratic	December 5, 2022 – present	Elected in 2022. Re-elected in 2026.	Orange, San Diego

== Election results (1990-present) ==
=== 2022 ===
2022 California State Senate 38th district election
Primary election
Party	Candidate	Votes	%
Republican	Matt Gunderson	106,358	45.9
Democratic	Catherine Blakespear	99,583	43.0
Democratic	Joe Kerr	25,908	11.2
Total votes		231,849	100.0
General election
Democratic	Catherine Blakespear	190,992	52.2
Republican	Matt Gunderson	174,581	47.8
Total votes		365,573	100.0
Democratic gain from Republican			

=== 2018 ===
2018 California State Senate 38th district election
Primary election
Party	Candidate	Votes	%
Republican	Brian Jones	114,270	57.2
Democratic	Jeff Griffith	79,862	40.0
Libertarian	Antonio Salguero	5,576	2.8
Total votes		199,708	100.0
General election
Republican	Brian Jones	187,345	53.0
Democratic	Jeff Griffith	166,092	47.0
Total votes		353,437	100.0
Republican hold			

=== 2014 ===
2014 California State Senate 38th district election
Primary election
Party	Candidate	Votes	%
Republican	Joel Anderson (incumbent)	87,933	71.1
Democratic	Fotios "Frank" Tsimboukakis	35,656	28.9
Total votes		123,589	100.0
General election
Republican	Joel Anderson (incumbent)	146,510	68.9
Democratic	Fotios "Frank" Tsimboukakis	66,066	30.8
Total votes		212,576	100.0
Republican hold			

=== 2010 ===
2010 California State Senate 38th district election
Party	Candidate	Votes	%
Republican	Mark Wyland (incumbent)	169,769	60.2
Democratic	Gila Jones	96,884	34.4
Libertarian	Kristi Stone	15,185	5.4
Total votes		281,838	100.0
Republican hold			

=== 2006 ===
2006 California State Senate 38th district election
Party	Candidate	Votes	%
Republican	Mark Wyland	162,046	74.3
Libertarian	Brian Klea	55,964	25.7
Total votes		218,010	100.0
Republican hold			

=== 2002 ===
2002 California State Senate 38th district election
Party	Candidate	Votes	%
Republican	Bill Morrow (incumbent)	132,577	66.1
Democratic	Philip G. Hanneman	60,182	30.0
Libertarian	Lars R. Grossmith	7,819	3.9
Total votes		200,578	100.0
Republican hold			

=== 1998 ===
1998 California State Senate 38th district election
Party	Candidate	Votes	%
Republican	Bill Morrow	136,889	60.3
Democratic	Madelene Arakelian	74,597	32.8
Natural Law	Barbara Blair	5,828	2.6
Independent	Eugene Gilbert Carl	5,504	2.4
Libertarian	Paul King	4,315	1.9
Total votes		227,133	100.0
Republican hold			

=== 1994 ===
1994 California State Senate 38th district election
Party	Candidate	Votes	%
Republican	William A. Craven (incumbent)	156,090	65.5
Democratic	Thomas Berry	60,976	25.6
Libertarian	August Anderson	11,336	4.8
Peace and Freedom	Mary Ann Niki	9,811	4.1
Total votes		238,313	100.0
Republican hold			

=== 1990 ===
1900 California State Senate 38th district election
Party	Candidate	Votes	%
Republican	William A. Craven (incumbent)	171,208	66.8
Peace and Freedom	Jane Rocio Evans	46,645	18.2
Libertarian	Scott Olmsted	38,582	15.0
Total votes		256,435	100.0
Republican hold			

== See also ==
- California State Senate
- California State Senate districts
- Districts in California
