= California's 30th senatorial district =

American legislative district

California's 30th State Senate district
Current senator
Bob Archuleta; D–Pico Rivera
- Population (2010) • Voting age • Citizen voting age: 922,496; 686,822; 465,763
- Demographics: 14.05% White; 27.90% Black; 50.04% Latino; 6.30% Asian; 0.24% Native American; 0.11% Hawaiian/Pacific Islander; 0.51% other; 0.85% remainder of multiracial
- Registered voters: 550,416
- Registration: 64.84% Democratic; 6.74% Republican; 23.18% No party preference

California's 30th senatorial district is one of 40 California State Senate districts. The seat is currently represented by Democrat Bob Archuleta of Pico Rivera.

== District profile ==
The district encompasses the Gateway Cities region of southeastern Los Angeles County, including Downey, Norwalk, Bellflower, La Mirada, Santa Fe Springs, Los Nietos, Montebello, Pico Rivera, Whittier, Hacienda Heights, La Puente, Valinda, Avocado Heights, Industry, Rowland Heights, Walnut, and Diamond Bar, along with Brea in northeastern Orange County.

== Election results from statewide races ==
Year	Office	Results
2021	Recall	No 86.8 – 13.2%
2020	President	Biden 85.6 – 12.5%
2018	Governor	Newsom 87.5 – 12.5%
2018	Senator	Feinstein 64.0 – 36.0%
2016	President	Clinton 87.5 – 8.0%
2016	Senator	Harris 71.3 – 28.7%
2014	Governor	Brown 86.0 – 14.0%
2012	President	Obama 88.3 – 9.7%
2012	Senator	Feinstein 88.4 – 11.6%

== List of senators representing the district ==
Due to redistricting, the 30th district has been moved around different parts of the state. The current iteration resulted from the 2021 redistricting by the California Citizens Redistricting Commission.

Senators	Party	Years served	Electoral history	Counties represented
A. J. Meany (Merced)	Democratic	January 3, 1887 – January 5, 1891	Elected in 1886. Retired.	Merced, Stanislaus, Tuolumne
Thomas D. Harp (Ceres)	Democratic	January 5, 1891 – October 31, 1891	Elected in 1890. Indicted on bribery charges and fled the state.	Merced, Stanislaus, Tuolumne
Vacant		October 31, 1891 – January 7, 1895		Merced, Stanislaus, Tuolumne
Frederick C. Franck (Santa Clara)	Republican	January 7, 1895 – January 2, 1899	Elected in 1894. [data missing]	Santa Clara
Charles M. Shortridge (San Jose)	Republican	January 2, 1899 – January 5, 1903	Elected in 1898. Restricted to the 28th district.	Santa Clara
Orrin Z. Hubbell (Ontario)	Republican	January 5, 1903 – April 17, 1903	Elected in 1902. Died.	Inyo, San Bernardino
Vacant		April 17, 1903 – January 2, 1905		Inyo, San Bernardino
William T. Leeke (Ontario)	Republican	January 2, 1905 – January 7, 1907	Elected in 1904. [data missing]	Inyo, San Bernardino
Henry M. Willis (San Bernardino)	Republican	January 7, 1907 – January 2, 1911	Elected in 1906. [data missing]	Inyo, San Bernardino
John L. Avey (Redlands)	Republican	January 2, 1911 – January 4, 1915	Elected in 1910. [data missing]	Inyo, San Bernardino
Lyman King (Redlands)	Republican	January 4, 1915 – January 8, 1923	Elected in 1914. Re-elected in 1918. [data missing]	Inyo, San Bernardino
Ralph E. Swing (Upland)	Democratic	January 8, 1923 – January 5, 1931	Elected in 1922. Re-elected in 1926. Redistricted to the 36th district.	Inyo, San Bernardino
Ray W. Hays (Fresno)	Republican	January 5, 1931 – January 4, 1943	Elected in 1930. Re-elected in 1934. Re-elected in 1938. [data missing]	Fresno
Hugh M. Burns (Fresno)	Democratic	January 4, 1943 – January 2, 1967	Elected in 1942. Re-elected in 1946. Re-elected in 1950. Re-elected in 1954. Re-elected in 1958. Re-elected in 1962. Redistricted to the 16th district.	Fresno
Lawrence E. Walsh (Huntington Park)	Democratic	January 2, 1967 – November 30, 1974	Elected in 1966. Re-elected in 1970. Retired to run for Lieutenant Governor.	Los Angeles
Nate Holden (Los Angeles)	Democratic	December 2, 1974 – November 30, 1978	Elected in 1974. Retired to run for U.S. House of Representatives.	Los Angeles
Diane Watson (Los Angeles)	Democratic	December 4, 1978 – November 30, 1982	Elected in 1978. Redistricted to the 26th district.	Los Angeles
Ralph C. Dills (Paramount)	Democratic	December 6, 1982 – November 30, 1994	Elected in 1982. Re-elected in 1986. Re-elected in 1990. Redistricted to the 28th district.	Los Angeles
Charles Calderon (Montebello)	Democratic	December 4, 1994 – November 30, 1998	Elected in 1994. Retired to run for Attorney General.	Los Angeles
Martha Escutia (Los Angeles)	Democratic	December 7, 1998 – November 30, 2006	Elected in 1998. Re-elected in 2002. Retired due to term limits.	Los Angeles
Ron Calderon (Montebello)	Democratic	December 4, 2006 – November 30, 2014	Elected in 2006. Re-elected in 2010. Redistricted to the 32nd district and retired due to term limits.	Los Angeles
Holly Mitchell (Los Angeles)	Democratic	December 1, 2014 – December 6, 2020	Elected in 2014. Re-elected in 2018. Resigned to become a member of the Los Angeles County Board of Supervisors.	Los Angeles
Vacant		December 6, 2020 – March 11, 2021		Los Angeles
Sydney Kamlager (Los Angeles)	Democratic	March 11, 2021 – November 30, 2022	Elected in finish Mitchell's term. Retired to run for U.S. House of Representatives.	Los Angeles
Bob Archuleta (Pico Rivera)	Democratic	December 5, 2022 – present	Redistricted from the 32nd district and re-elected in 2022.	Los Angeles

== Election results (1990-present) ==
=== 2022 ===
2022 California State Senate 30th district election
Primary election
Party	Candidate	Votes	%
Democratic	Bob Archuleta (incumbent)	43,243	35.6
Republican	Mitch Clemmons	41,287	34.0
Democratic	Martha Camacho Rodriguez	19,011	15.7
Democratic	Henry Bouchot	17,820	14.7
Total votes		121,361	100.0
General election
Democratic	Bob Archuleta (incumbent)	129,890	61.0
Republican	Mitch Clemmons	83,214	39.0
Total votes		213,104	100.0
Democratic hold			

=== 2021 (special) ===
2021 California State Senate 30th district special election Vacancy resulting from the resignation of Holly Mitchell
Primary election
Party	Candidate	Votes	%
Democratic	Sydney Kamlager	48,483	68.7
Democratic	Daniel Wayne Lee	9,458	13.4
Republican	Joe Lisuzzo	4,412	6.3
Democratic	Cheryl C. Turner	3,799	5.4
Republican	Tiffani Jones	1,611	2.3
Peace and Freedom	Ernesto Alexander Huerta	1,570	2.2
No party preference	Renita Duncan	1,244	1.8
Total votes		70,577	100.0
Democratic hold			

=== 2018 ===
2018 California State Senate 30th district election
Primary election
Party	Candidate	Votes	%
Democratic	Holly Mitchell (incumbent)	93,078	100.0
Total votes		93,078	100.0
General election
Democratic	Holly Mitchell (incumbent)	230,623	100.0
Total votes		230,623	100.0
Democratic hold			

=== 2014 ===
2014 California State Senate 30th district election
Primary election
Party	Candidate	Votes	%
Democratic	Holly Mitchell (incumbent)	48,280	85.3
Democratic	Isidro Armenta	8,301	14.7
Total votes		56,581	100.0
General election
Democratic	Holly Mitchell (incumbent)	78,115	68.8
Democratic	Isidro Armenta	35,442	31.2
Total votes		113,557	100.0
Democratic hold			

=== 2010 ===
2010 California State Senate 30th district election
Party	Candidate	Votes	%
Democratic	Ronald Calderon (incumbent)	105,946	68.6
Republican	Warren P. Willis	48,534	31.4
Total votes		154,480	100.0
Democratic hold			

=== 2006 ===
2006 California State Senate 30th district election
Party	Candidate	Votes	%
Democratic	Ron Calderon	93,436	70.9
Republican	Selma Minerd	38,340	29.1
Total votes		131,776	100.0
Democratic hold			

=== 2002 ===
2002 California State Senate 30th district election
Party	Candidate	Votes	%
Democratic	Martha M. Escutia (incumbent)	80,562	67.1
Republican	John O. Robertson	39,498	32.9
Total votes		120,060	100.0
Democratic hold			

=== 1998 ===
1998 California State Senate 30th district election
Party	Candidate	Votes	%
Democratic	Martha Escutia	80,562	74.0
Republican	John O. Robertson	24,520	22.5
Libertarian	John P. McCready	3,816	3.5
Total votes		108,898	100.0
Democratic hold			

=== 1994 ===
1994 California State Senate 30th district election
Party	Candidate	Votes	%
Democratic	Charles Calderon (incumbent)	72,968	67.9
Republican	Ken Gow	34,498	32.1
Total votes		107,466	100.0
Democratic hold			

=== 1990 ===
1990 California State Senate 30th district election
Party	Candidate	Votes	%
Democratic	Ralph C. Dills (incumbent)	63,771	68.3
Republican	Timothy Poling	29,625	31.7
Total votes		93,396	100.0
Democratic hold			

== See also ==
- California State Senate
- California State Senate districts
- Districts in California
