= Ruben Ayala (politician) =

American politician (1922–2012)

Ruben S. Ayala
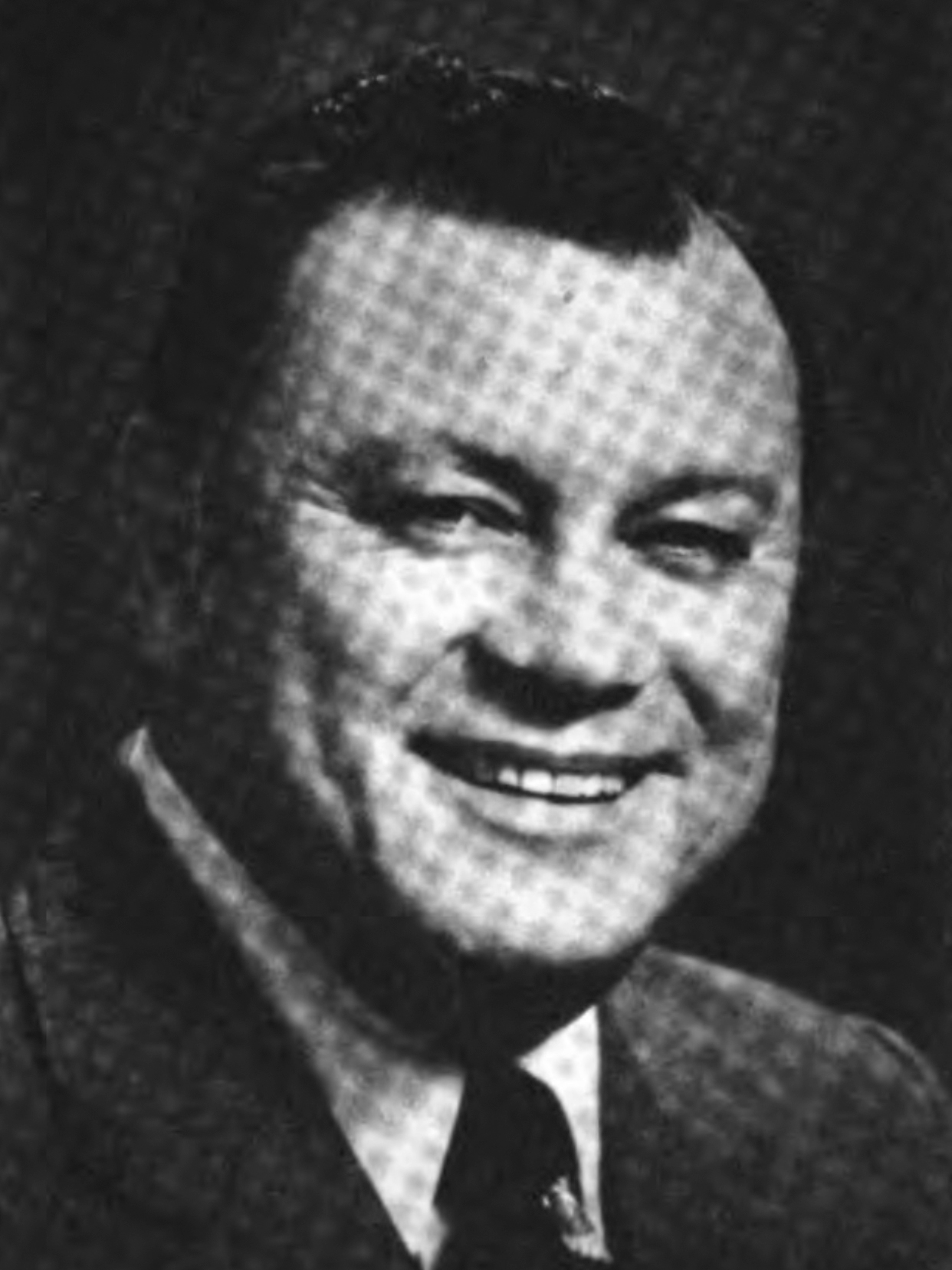

Member of the California Senate
- In office January 23, 1974 – November 30, 1998
- Preceded by: William E. Coombs
- Succeeded by: Joe Baca
- Constituency: 20th district (1974); 32nd district (1974–82); 34th district (1982–94); 32nd district (1994–98)

Member of the San Bernardino County Board of Supervisors
- In office 1967–1973

Mayor of Chino, California
- In office 1964–1966

Personal details
- Born: Rubén Samuel Ayala; March 6, 1922 Chino, California, U.S.
- Died: January 4, 2012 (aged 89) Ontario, California, U.S.
- Party: Democratic
- Spouse: Irene
- Children: 3
- Education: Mt. San Antonio College

Military service
- Branch/service: United States Marine Corps
- Years of service: 1941-1946
- Battles/wars: World War II

Rubén Samuel Ayala (March 6, 1922 – January 4, 2012) was an American politician. Ayala served as the first elected Mayor of Chino, California from 1964 to 1966, and a California State Senator for twenty-four years from 1974 to 1998.

== Biography ==
=== Early life ===
Ayala was born on March 6, 1922, in Chino, California, as one of six siblings. His grandparents were immigrants from Mexico. His mother died at an early age and his father supported the six children as a well digger. Ayala helped his father by working in the beet farms surrounding Chino and as a shoe shiner. He attended segregated elementary schools in Chino. Segregation also prevented the family from moving to or purchasing property in predominantly Non-Hispanic white neighborhoods in Chino.

Ayala graduated from Chino High School. He then enrolled at Pomona Junior College, which is now called Mt. San Antonio College. Ayala served in the United States Marines in the Pacific Theater during World War II from 1941 to 1946.

He returned to Chino after the war and graduated from the National Electronic Institute in Los Angeles. He initially worked as a television repairman for the Admiral Television Company. He also held a position as a sales manager for the Homelight Corporation, which sold construction materials.

He married his wife, Irene, and had three sons. He joined the local Chino Parent-Teacher Association, which began an interest in politics.

=== Local political career ===
In 1955, Ayala was elected to the school board for the Chino school district. He served on the Chino School Board from 1955 to 1962. Ayala then turned his attention to citywide politics. He was elected to the Chino City Council, serving in the council from 1962 to 1964.

Ayala became the first elected Mayor of Chino, California, in 1964, holding that office until 1966. He was elected to the San Bernardino County Board of Supervisors in 1965, serving in that county-wide office from 1966 until 1973, including four years as the board's chairman.

=== Statewide politics ===
Ayala challenged former Democratic U.S. Rep. George Brown Jr. in a 1972 primary election for a newly redrawn U.S. House seat. The more progressive Brown narrowly defeated Ayala in the primary, marking the only election loss in Ayala's political career.

In 1974, Ayala defeated California Assemblyman Jerry Lewis, a Republican from San Bernardino County and future U.S. congressman, in a special election for an open California State Senate seat. His new Senate district represented the San Bernardino County cities of Chino, Colton, Fontana, Ontario and Rialto, as well as Pomona, California, in neighboring Los Angeles County. Upon his 1974 election, Ayala became the first person of Mexican American descent elected to the California State Senate since 1911.

Ayala became known as a maverick and swing vote in the Senate, willing to support or oppose bills from both his fellow Democrats and the Republicans. He co-authored a bill which created the California Conservation Corps, which enlists young people to work in environmental conservation. The legislation to create the Corps was signed into law by Governor Jerry Brown in 1976. Ayala later became the chairman of the Senate Agriculture and Water Resources Committee, which increased his influence on California's water policy. Ayala supported a proposal for the Peripheral Canal, which would have diverted water from northern California to the central and southern portions of the state. The canal proposal was signed into law by Governor Jerry Brown, but opposed by environmental organizations. The canal was roundly defeated by voters in 1982, with 62% opposition, including a plurality of voters in Northern California.

Ayala's other political viewpoints sometimes proved controversial as well. A political centrist, he was viewed as more conservative than most of the State Senate's Democrats, but more liberal than most of the body's Republicans. He refused to join the Senate's Latino caucus, telling the Riverside Press-Enterprise, "I'm of Mexican descent and I'm proud of it, but I don't wear it on my sleeve ... I don't want to be segregated." His refusal to join the caucus drew criticism from some Latino activists. Ayala blocked the appointment of actress Jane Fonda to the California Arts Council. He opposed abortion, supported some gun control measures, and supported organized labor.

Most of Ayala's re-election campaigns were relatively noncompetitive. However, Ayala won his most competitive re-election campaign in 1990. That year, he was challenged for his seat by Republican assemblyman Charles W. Bader. Ayala raised more than one million dollars during his 1990 re-election campaign, which he won by a small margin.

In 1990, California voters approved term limits for California state senators and assemblymen. Ayala left office in 1998 as the term limits took effect.

=== Later life ===
A park in Bloomington, California, and a street in Rialto, California, have been named for Ayala. A high school in Chino Hills within the Chino Valley Unified School District was established in his honor in 1990 and is named Ruben S. Ayala High School.

Rubén Ayala died at the Inland Christian Home in Ontario, California, on January 4, 2012, at the age of 89. He was survived by his three sons, three grandchildren, and two great-grandchildren.

He was inducted into the Chino Hall of Fame on January 17, 2012.
