= California's 32nd senatorial district =

American legislative district

California's 32nd State Senate district
Current senator
Kelly Seyarto; R–Murrieta
- Population (2010) • Voting age • Citizen voting age: 933,406; 692,591; 535,094
- Demographics: 19.17% White; 3.71% Black; 60.92% Latino; 14.86% Asian; 0.39% Native American; 0.32% Hawaiian/Pacific Islander; 0.22% other; 0.42% remainder of multiracial
- Registered voters: 523,558
- Registration: 49.59% Democratic; 20.98% Republican; 24.10% No party preference

California's 32nd senatorial district is one of 40 California State Senate districts. It is currently represented by Republican Kelly Seyarto of Murrieta.

== District profile ==
The district encompasses the southwestern corner of the Inland Empire, including the Riverside County communities of Temecula, Murrieta, Wildomar, Lake Elsinore, Canyon Lake, Lakeland Village, Alberhill, Menifee, Sage, and Idyllwild. It also includes Yorba Linda in eastern Orange County; Chino Hills in southwestern San Bernardino County; and the rural, northeastern corner of San Diego County.

== Election results from statewide races ==
Year	Office	Results
2020	President	Biden 65.0 – 32.9%
2018	Governor	Newsom 64.9 – 35.1%
2018	Senator	Feinstein 53.3 – 46.7%
2016	President	Clinton 66.5 – 27.9%
2016	Senator	Sanchez 50.7 – 49.3%
2014	Governor	Brown 58.9 – 41.1%
2012	President	Obama 64.2 – 33.7%
2012	Senator	Feinstein 65.8 – 34.2%

== List of senators representing the district ==
Due to redistricting, the 32nd district has been moved around different parts of the state. The current iteration resulted from the 2021 redistricting by the California Citizens Redistricting Commission.

Senators	Party	Years served	Electoral history	Counties represented
E. B. Conklin (Los Gatos)	Republican	January 3, 1887 – January 5, 1891	Elected in 1886. [data missing]	Santa Clara
W. C. Bailey (San Jose)	Republican	January 5, 1891 – January 7, 1895	Elected in 1890. [data missing]	Santa Clara
Reynold Linder (Tulare)	Republican	January 7, 1895 – January 2, 1899	Elected in 1894. [data missing]	Inyo, Kings, Tulare
H. L. Pace (Tulare)	Democratic	January 2, 1899 – January 5, 1903	Elected in 1888. [data missing]	Inyo, Kings, Tulare
E. J. Emmons (Bakersfield)	Democratic	January 5, 1903 – February 27, 1905	Elected in 1902. Expelled for accepting bribes.	Kern, Kings, Tulare
Vacant		February 27, 1905 – January 7, 1907		Kern, Kings, Tulare
E. O. Miller (Visalia)	Democratic	January 7, 1907 – January 2, 1911	Elected in 1906. [data missing]	Kern, Kings, Tulare
E. O. Larkins (Visalia)	Republican	January 2, 1911 – January 4, 1915	Elected in 1910. [data missing]	Kern, Kings, Tulare
J. L. C. Irwin (Hanford)	Democratic	January 4, 1915 – January 8, 1923	Elected in 1914. Re-elected in 1918. [data missing]	Kern, Kings, Tulare
John Creighton (Bakersfield)	Republican	January 8, 1923 – May 7, 1925	Elected in 1922. Died.	Kern, Kings, Tulare
Vacant		May 7, 1925 – January 3, 1927		Kern, Kings, Tulare
James I. Wagy (Bakersfield)	Republican	January 3, 1927 – January 5, 1931	Elected in 1926. Redistricted to the 34th district.	Kern, Kings, Tulare
Frank W. Mixter (Porterville)	Republican	January 5, 1931 – January 6, 1947	Elected in 1930. Re-elected in 1934. Re-elected in 1938. Re-elected in 1942. [data missing]	Tulare
J. Howard Williams (Porterville)	Republican	January 6, 1947 – May 7, 1962	Elected in 1946. Re-elected in 1950. Re-elected in 1954. Re-elected in 1958. Died.	Tulare
Vacant		May 7, 1962 – January 7, 1963		Tulare
Howard Way (Exeter)	Republican	January 7, 1963 – January 2, 1967	Elected in 1962. Redistricted to the 15th district.	
Ralph C. Dills (Paramount)	Democratic	January 2, 1967 – November 30, 1974	Elected in 1966. Re-elected in 1970. Redistricted to the 28th district.	Los Angeles
Ruben Ayala (Chino)	Democratic	December 2, 1974 – November 30, 1982	Redistricted from the 20th district and re-elected in 1974. Re-elected in 1978. Redistricted to the 34th district.	San Bernardino
Ed Royce (Anaheim)	Republican	December 6, 1982 – January 2, 1993	Elected in 1982. Re-elected in 1986. Re-elected in 1990. Resigned to run for U.S. House of Representatives.	Orange
Vacant		January 2, 1993 – March 8, 1993		Orange
Rob Hurtt (Garden Grove)	Republican	March 8, 1993 – November 30, 1994	Elected to finish Royce's term. Redistricted to the 34th district.	Orange
Ruben Ayala (Chino)	Democratic	December 5, 1994 – November 30, 1998	Redistricted from the 34th district. Retired due to term limits.	Los Angeles, San Bernardino
Joe Baca (Fontana)	Democratic	December 7, 1998 – November 16, 1999	Elected in 1998. Resigned to run for U.S. House of Representatives.	Los Angeles, San Bernardino
Vacant		November 16, 1999 – March 13, 2000		Los Angeles, San Bernardino
Nell Soto (Pomona)	Democratic	March 13, 2000 – November 30, 2006	Elected to finish Baba's term. Re-elected in 2002. Retired to run for State Assembly.	Los Angeles, San Bernardino
Gloria N. McLeod (Chino)	Democratic	December 4, 2006 – January 2, 2013	Elected in 2006. Re-elected in 2010. Resigned to run for U.S. House of Representatives.	Los Angeles, San Bernardino
Vacant		January 2, 2013 – May 20, 2013		Los Angeles, San Bernardino
Norma Torres (Pomona)	Democratic	May 20, 2013 – November 30, 2014	Elected to finish McLeod's term. Retired to run for U.S. House of Representatives.	Los Angeles, San Bernardino
Tony Mendoza (Artesia)	Democratic	December 1, 2014 – February 22, 2018	Elected in 2014. Resigned to avoid expulsion due to allegations of sexual harassment. Ran for re-election and lost both special and regular elections.	Los Angeles, Orange
Vacant		February 22, 2018 – August 13, 2018		Los Angeles, Orange
Vanessa Delgado (Montebello)	Democratic	August 13, 2018 – November 30, 2018	Elected to finish Mendoza's term. Lost re-election for full term.	Los Angeles, Orange
Bob Archuleta (Pico Rivera)	Democratic	December 3, 2018 – November 30, 2022	Elected in 2018. Redistricted to the 30th district.	Los Angeles, Orange
Kelly Seyarto (Murrieta)	Republican	December 5, 2022 – present	Elected in 2022.	Riverside

== Election results (1990-present) ==
=== 2022 ===
2022 California State Senate 32nd district election
Primary election
Party	Candidate	Votes	%
Republican	Kelly Seyarto	112,728	62.8
Democratic	Brian Nash	66,644	37.2
Total votes		179,372	100.0
General election
Republican	Kelly Seyarto	184,086	62.0
Democratic	Brian Nash	112,763	38.0
Total votes		296,849	100.0
Republican gain from Democratic			

=== 2018 ===
2018 California State Senate 32nd district election
Primary election
Party	Candidate	Votes	%
Republican	Rita Topalian	28,979	24.4
Democratic	Bob Archuleta	20,652	17.4
Democratic	Vanessa Delgado	18,709	15.7
Democratic	Tony Mendoza	11,917	10.0
Republican	Ion Sarega	11,577	9.7
Democratic	Vicky Santana	8,236	6.9
Democratic	Ali S. Taj	6,349	5.3
Democratic	Vivian Romero	5,495	4.6
Democratic	Rudy Bermudez	5,455	4.6
Democratic	David Castellanos	1,541	1.3
Total votes		118,910	100.0
General election
Democratic	Bob Archuleta	177,054	66.9
Republican	Rita Topalian	87,520	33.1
Total votes		264,574	100.0
Democratic hold			

=== 2018 (special) ===
2018 California State Senate 32nd district special election Vacancy resulting from the resignation of Tony Mendoza
Primary election
Party	Candidate	Votes	%
Republican	Rita Topalian	29,135	25.0
Democratic	Vanessa Delgado	18,898	16.2
Democratic	Tony Mendoza	16,779	14.4
Democratic	Bob J. Archuleta	13,593	11.7
Republican	Ion Sarega	10,720	9.2
Democratic	Vicky Santana	7,960	6.8
Democratic	Ali S. Taj	6,961	6.0
Democratic	Vivian Romero	5,379	4.6
Democratic	Rudy Bermudez	5,117	4.4
Democratic	John Paul Drayer	1,294	1.1
Democratic	Darren Joseph Gendron	599	0.5
Total votes		116,435	100.0
General election
Democratic	Vanessa Delgado	26,635	52.4
Republican	Rita Topalian	24,240	47.6
Total votes		50,884	100.0
Democratic hold			

=== 2014 ===
2014 California State Senate 32nd district election
Primary election
Party	Candidate	Votes	%
Republican	Mario Guerra	29,096	44.5
Democratic	Tony Mendoza	20,804	31.8
Democratic	Sally Havice	7,325	11.2
Democratic	Irella Perez	6,873	10.5
Democratic	Carlos Arvizu	1,280	2.0
Total votes		65,378	100.0
General election
Democratic	Tony Mendoza	67,593	52.3
Republican	Mario Guerra	61,718	47.7
Total votes		129,311	100.0
Democratic hold			

=== 2013 (special) ===
2013 California State Senate 32nd district special election Vacancy resulting from the resignation of Gloria Negrete McLeod
Primary election
Party	Candidate	Votes	%
Democratic	Norma Torres	15,021	44.2
Republican	Paul S. Leon	8,961	26.4
Democratic	Larry Walker	4,620	13.6
Democratic	Joanne T. Gilbert	2,327	6.9
Republican	Kenny Coble	2,178	6.4
Democratic	Paul Vincent Avila	845	2.5
Total votes		33,952	100.0
General election
Democratic	Norma Torres	21,251	59.6
Republican	Paul S. Leon	14,432	40.4
Total votes		35,683	100.0
Democratic hold			

=== 2010 ===
2010 California State Senate 32nd district election
Party	Candidate	Votes	%
Democratic	Gloria Negrete McLeod (incumbent)	92,691	67.9
Republican	Earl De Vries	43,924	32.1
Total votes		136,615	100.0
Democratic hold			

=== 2006 ===
2006 California State Senate 32nd district election
Party	Candidate	Votes	%
Democratic	Gloria Negrete McLeod	85,301	100.0
Total votes		85,301	100.0
Democratic hold			

=== 2002 ===
2002 California State Senate 32nd district election
Party	Candidate	Votes	%
Democratic	Nell Soto (incumbent)	60,761	67.6
Republican	Ken Robertson	29,101	32.4
Total votes		89,862	100.0
Democratic hold			

=== 2000 (special) ===
2002 California State Senate 32nd district election
Primary election
Party	Candidate	Votes	%
Democratic	Nell Soto	19,825	48.3
Republican	Rob Guzman	16,271	39.6
Democratic	David R. Eshleman	4,957	12.1
Total votes		41,053	100.0
General election
Democratic	Nell Soto	59,999	56.2
Republican	Rob Guzman	46,699	43.8
Total votes		106,698	100.0
Democratic hold			

=== 1998 ===
1998 California State Senate 32nd district election
Party	Candidate	Votes	%
Democratic	Joe Baca	75,424	58.5
Republican	Eunice M. Ulloa	49,201	38.2
Libertarian	John S. Ballard	4,275	3.3
Total votes		128,900	100.0
Democratic hold			

=== 1994 ===
1994 California State Senate 32nd district election
Party	Candidate	Votes	%
Democratic	Ruben Ayala (incumbent)	76,849	60.7
Republican	Earl De Vries	49,667	39.3
Total votes		126,516	100.0
Democratic gain from Republican			

=== 1990 ===
1990 California State Senate 32nd district election
Party	Candidate	Votes	%
Republican	Ed Royce (incumbent)	80,788	61.3
Democratic	Evelyn Colon Becktell	51,086	38.7
Total votes		131,874	100.0
Republican hold			

== See also ==
- California State Senate
- California State Senate districts
- Districts in California
