= Tony Mendoza (politician) =

American politician

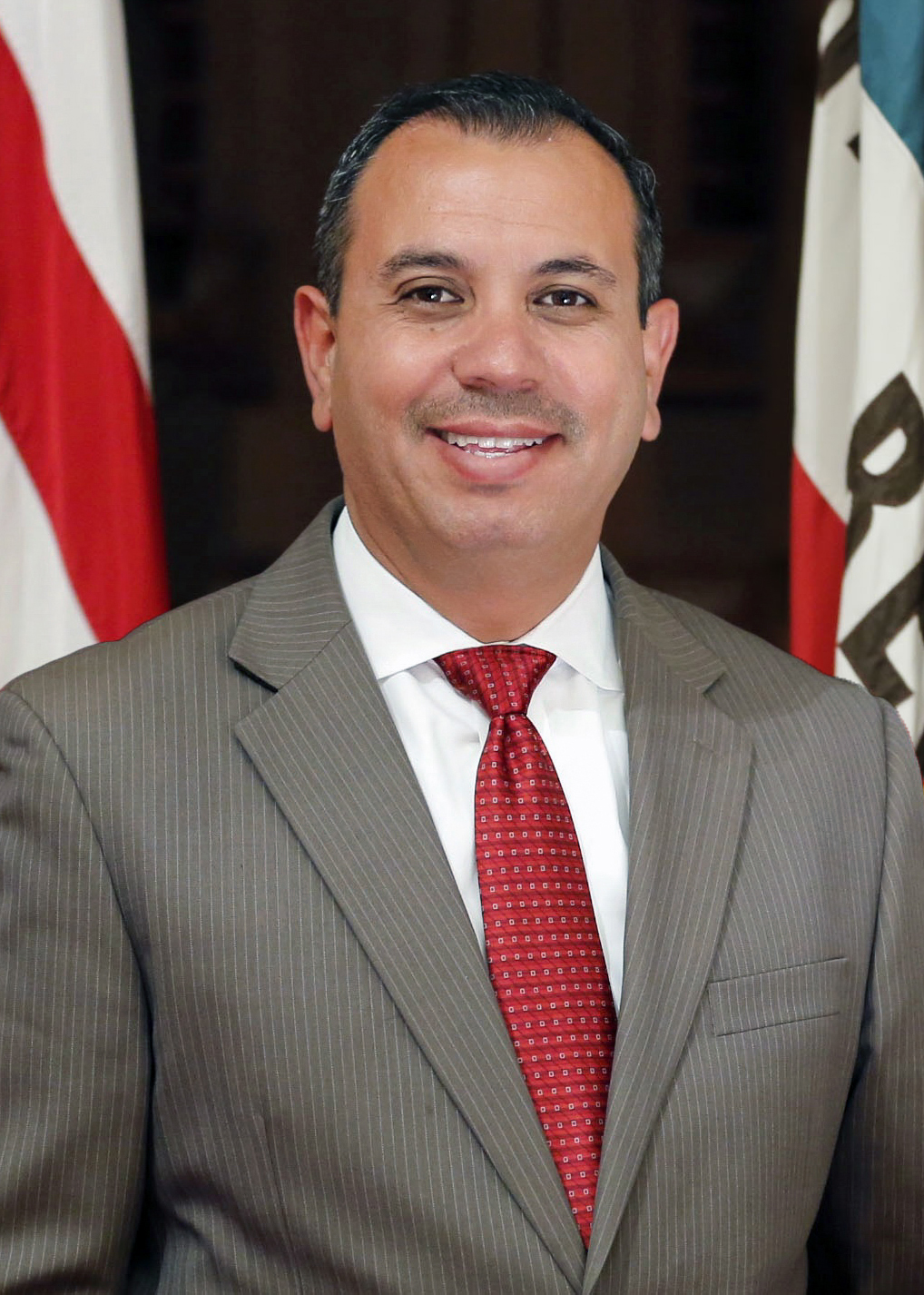
- Official portrait, 2014

Member of the California State Senate from the 32nd district
- In office December 1, 2014 – February 22, 2018
- Preceded by: Norma Torres (redistricted)
- Succeeded by: Vanessa Delgado

Member of the California State Assembly from the 56th district
- In office December 4, 2006 – November 30, 2012
- Preceded by: Rudy Bermudez
- Succeeded by: V. Manuel Perez

Artesia City Councillor
- In office March 10, 1997 – November 13, 2006

Personal details
- Born: April 22, 1971 (age 55) Los Angeles, California
- Party: Democratic
- Spouse: Leticia
- Children: 4
- Education: California State University, Long Beach
- Occupation: Teacher

Antonio Mendoza (born April 22, 1971) is an American politician who served in the California State Senate. A Democrat, he represented the 32nd Senate District, which encompasses Buena Park and the Gateway Cities of Los Angeles County. In January 2018, the State Senate voted to suspend him for 60 days to investigate allegations of sexual harassment. He could not vote on legislation during that period, while contesting the suspension. Before a vote for expulsion was to be taken by the State Senate due to the released findings of an investigation that determined he likely engaged in a pattern of unwanted advances and sexually suggestive behavior toward six women, including four subordinates, over the last decade, Mendoza resigned on February 22, 2018.

He was a member of the California Latino Legislative Caucus. Prior to being elected to the State Senate in 2014, Mendoza served in the California State Assembly from 2006 to 2012, representing the 56th Assembly District. Before his service in the Legislature, Mendoza was a fourth grade teacher in East Los Angeles, and served as a Mayor and City Councilmember in Artesia.

After resigning from the State Senate, in 2019 he was appointed as the general manager of the Artesia Cemetery, one of the few publicly owned and operated cemeteries in California.

== Career ==
After receiving his bachelor's degree in Political Science: Public Administration from California State University, Long Beach and his Multiple Subject Bilingual Teaching Credential from California State University, Los Angeles, Mendoza taught elementary school for ten years in East Los Angeles.

During his teaching years with the Los Angeles Unified School District, Mendoza served as a member of the board of directors with United Teachers Los Angeles (UTLA) and as a representative with the California Teachers Association (CTA) and the National Education Association (NEA).

In 1997, Mendoza ran a grassroots campaign in his hometown of Artesia as a candidate for city council. His platform of securing Artesia neighborhoods from gangs resonated with the community, and Mendoza became the youngest, and first Latino member, of the Artesia city council, and the youngest to serve as mayor at the age of 26.

Mendoza served three terms on the Artesia city council before running for the State Assembly in 2006. Mendoza represented the communities of Artesia, Buena Park, Cerritos, Hawaiian Gardens, Norwalk, Santa Fe Springs, Whittier, Lakewood, Los Nietos, and South Whittier.

== Legislative Accomplishments ==
Mendoza authored several bills that were signed and adopted into law while serving in the Assembly, including bills that dealt with health, public safety and the environment. AB 97 made California the first state in the nation to ban the use of trans fats in food preparation in all California restaurants, cafeterias and bakeries. AB 1291 helped parents take a lead role in the life of their child; the child who has been charged and convicted of a first-time gang related offense can jointly enroll with his or her parent or parents in anti-gang courses to prevent further involvement in gang activities. AB 1488 required smog checks for lightweight diesel vehicles to ensure they are running clean.

Mendoza's 2018 legislation was a mix of education, consumer and employment bills. AB 63 protects consumers by requiring retailers who issue a service contract or extended warranty to maintain a copy on file for the life of the contract, and make it available to a consumer within 10 days of request.

AB 943 would end the practice of using a person's credit report as a part of the hiring process with the exception of positions that deal with large sums of cash or expensive property.

AB 857 would place highly trained individuals from the Employment Development Department (EDD) in local EDD centers to work face-to-face with individuals on their unemployment benefits. This bill also would hire an additional 800 people to serve in call centers. The bill used no state money to fund the program, but instead allocated federal dollars to maintain the level of service to help those transitioning.

== Community work ==
In 2008, Mendoza launched the Young Legislators, a student program which put high school seniors from throughout the 56th Assembly District in real-life political scenarios. The program's goal is to teach high school seniors about the political world. Seniors who qualify take part in an eight-month program that introduces them to local, regional and statewide office holders who share their perspectives on various issues, and explain their role in the political process. Young Legislators conclude their studies by participating in a mock legislative session in Sacramento in which they deliver and deliberate on legislative bills they have designed and introduced.

== Controversies ==
=== Suspicious contributions ===
The California Fair Political Practices Commission launched an investigation after a series of contributions was made by Tony Mendoza and Assembly Candidate Tony Bermudez. "Latino Caucus Chairman Assembly Member Tony Mendoza, acting on his own accord and without input from Members of the Latino Caucus, provided a recommendation to transfer $50,000 from Yes We Can, an Independent Expenditure Committee (IEC), to another IEC prior to his resignation as Chair of the Caucus. The funds have since been transferred numerous times and have been used to support candidates who are not endorsed by the Latino Caucus. As the current Chair of the Latino Caucus, I do not condone or support his actions", said Ricardo Lara, D-South Gate. Bob Stern, former president of the Center for Governmental Studies, the principal co-author of the California Political Reform Act and the Fair Political Practices Commission's first general counsel, said the transactions look "very suspicious, but there could be explanations." "Money laundering is the most serious of campaign violations," Stern said, noting that money laundering is used to both skirt campaign contribution limits and conceal contributors."

=== Allegations of sexual harassment ===
In November 2017, Mendoza was accused of inviting a young female staffer to his residence in Sacramento. In February 2018, leaders of the State Assembly publicly released the findings of an investigation that determined he likely engaged in a pattern of unwanted advances and sexually suggestive behavior toward six women, including four subordinates, over the last decade. Senate President Pro Tem Kevin de León introduced Senate Resolution 85, which cites the house's zero-tolerance sexual harassment policy and the results of the investigation as grounds to expel Mendoza. Before the Senate could take a vote for expulsion, Mendoza resigned from his position.

== Personal life ==
Assemblyman Mendoza grew up in South Central Los Angeles. He is the first in his family of nine children to graduate from college. He received a bachelor's degree in Political Science from California State University, Long Beach. He received his teaching credential from Cal State Los Angeles.

Mendoza and his wife Leticia live in Artesia and have two daughters and two sons.
