= 2018 California State Senate election =

- November 6, 2018

20 seats from even-numbered districts in the California State Senate 21 seats needed for a majority
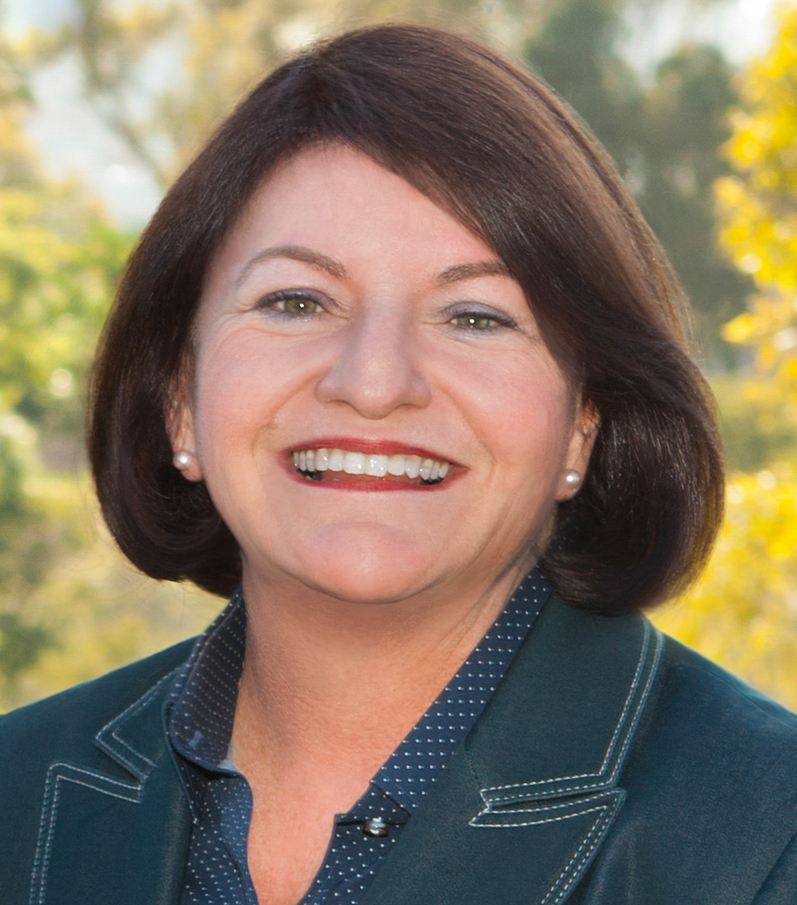

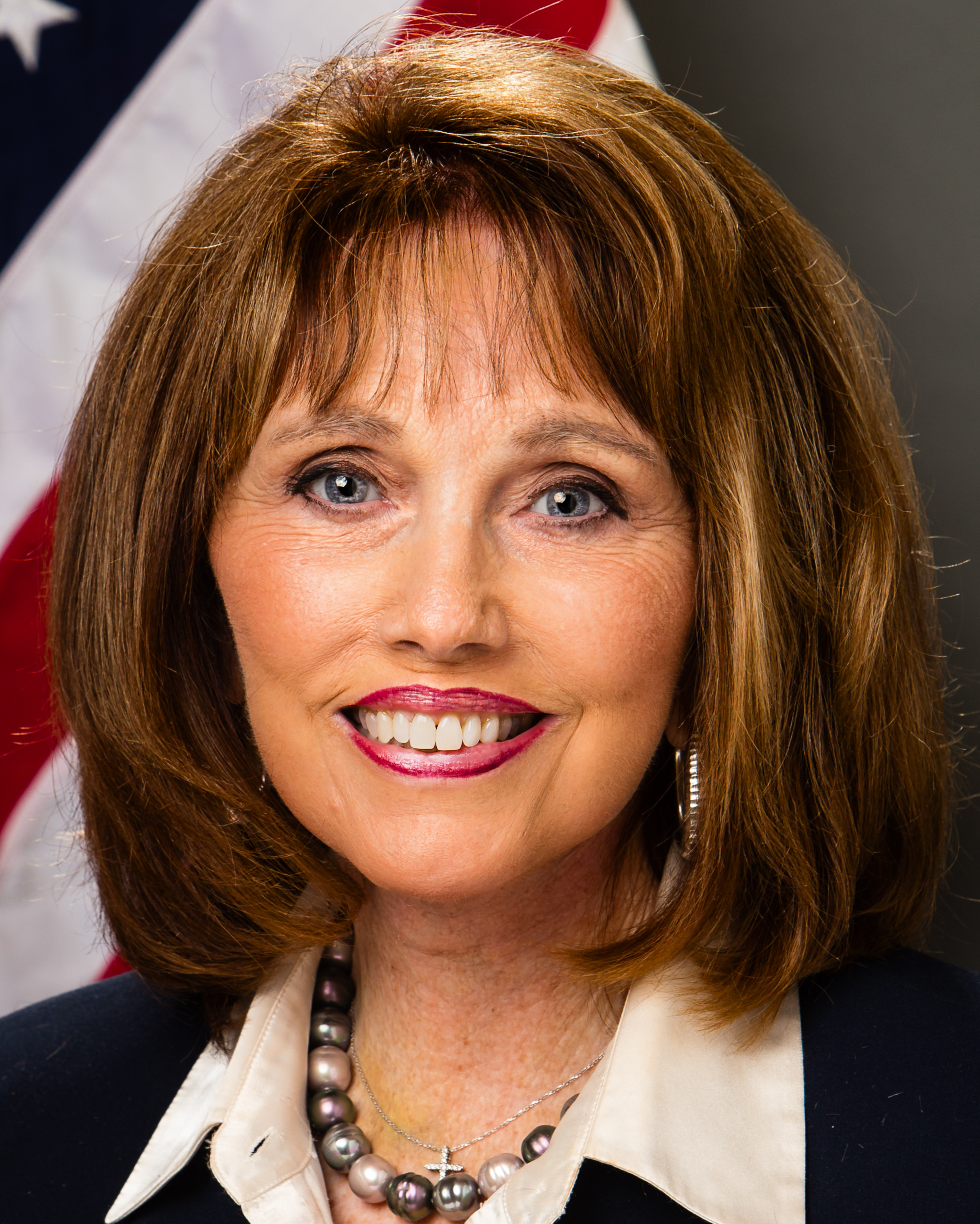
	Majority party	Minority party
Leader	Toni Atkins	Patricia Bates
Party	Democratic	Republican
Leader's seat	39th–San Diego	36th–Laguna Niguel
Last election	27	13
Seats before	26	14
Seats won	29	11
Seat change	▲3	▼3
Popular vote	3,562,527	1,742,012
Percentage	64.94%	31.76%
- Results: Democratic gain Democratic hold Republican hold No election held
President pro tempore before election
Toni Atkins
Democratic
President pro tempore-designate
Toni Atkins
Democratic

The 2018 California State Senate elections were held on Tuesday, November 6, 2018, with the primary election being held on June 5, 2018. Voters in the 20 even-numbered districts of the California State Senate elected their representatives. The elections coincided with the elections of other offices, including for governor and the California State Assembly.

The Democratic Party gained three seats: the 12th, 14th, and 34th districts. These victories provided the Democrats with 29 seats and restored the two-thirds supermajority that they lost after the recall of Democratic state senator Josh Newman in June 2018.

== Predictions ==
Source	Ranking	As of
Governing	Safe D	October 8, 2018

== Overview ==
2018 California State Senate election Primary election — June 5, 2018
Party	Votes	Percentage	Candidates	Advancing to general	Seats contesting
Democratic	1,742,492	60.72%	44	23	20
Republican	1,024,099	35.68%	19	14	14
No party preference	52,485	1.83%	3	2	2
Libertarian	50,838	1.77%	4	0	0
Totals	2,869,914	100.00%	70	39	—

2018 California State Senate election General election — November 6, 2018
Party	Votes	Percentage	Not up	Contested	Before	After	+/–
Democratic	3,562,527	64.94%	15	11	26	29	▲3
Republican	1,742,012	31.76%	5	9	14	11	▼3
No party preference	181,191	3.30%	0	0	0	0	0
Totals	5,485,730	100.00%	20	20	40	40	—

== District 2 ==
The 2nd district stretches along the North Coast from the Oregon border in the north to the San Francisco Bay Area in the south. It includes all of Del Norte County, Humboldt County, Lake County, Marin County, Mendocino County, and Trinity County, as well as a majority of Sonoma County. The incumbent was Democrat Mike McGuire, who was elected with 70.0% of the vote in 2014.

=== Candidates ===
- Veronica Jacobi (Democratic), former Santa Rosa city councilwoman and candidate for California's 10th State Assembly district in 2014 and 2016
- Mike McGuire (Democratic), incumbent state senator

=== Results ===
California's 2nd State Senate district, 2018
Primary election
Party	Candidate	Votes	%
Democratic	Mike McGuire (incumbent)	163,723	76.2
Democratic	Veronica "Roni" Jacobi	51,186	23.8
Total votes		214,909	100.0
General election
Democratic	Mike McGuire (incumbent)	233,688	67.2
Democratic	Veronica "Roni" Jacobi	114,184	32.8
Total votes		347,872	100.0
Democratic hold			

== District 4 ==
The 4th district encompasses the Sacramento Valley, mainly taking in rural farmland as well as Chico, and the Sacramento metropolitan area, including Carmichael, and parts of Rancho Cordova. The incumbent was Republican Jim Nielsen, who was reelected with 63.7% of the vote in 2014.

=== Candidates ===
- Phillip Kim (Democratic), community organizer and campaign staffer for Bernie Sanders 2016 presidential campaign
- Jim Nielsen (Republican), incumbent state senator
- Michael Worley (Democratic), Chico Area Recreation and Park District board member

=== Results ===
California's 4th State Senate district, 2018
Primary election
Party	Candidate	Votes	%
Republican	Jim Nielsen (incumbent)	118,756	60.3
Democratic	Phillip Kim	42,661	21.7
Democratic	Michael "Mike" Worley	35,472	18.0
Total votes		192,889	100.0
General election
Republican	Jim Nielsen (incumbent)	190,441	57.1
Democratic	Phillip Kim	142,817	42.9
Total votes		333,258	100.0
Republican hold			

== District 6 ==
The 6th district is located in the core of the Sacramento metropolitan area, including the state capital of Sacramento and surrounding suburbs. The incumbent was Democrat Richard Pan, who was elected with 53.8% of the vote in 2014.

=== Candidates ===
- Janine DeRose (Libertarian)
- Eric Frame (no party preference), activist
- Jacob Mason (Democratic), factory worker
- Richard Pan (Democratic), incumbent state senator

=== Results ===
California's 6th State Senate district, 2018
Primary election
Party	Candidate	Votes	%
Democratic	Richard Pan (incumbent)	109,907	65.7
No party preference	Eric Frame	22,062	13.2
Libertarian	Janine DeRose	18,308	10.9
Democratic	Jacob Mason	16,458	9.8
Republican	Austin Bennett (write-in)	530	0.3
Total votes		167,238	100.0
General election
Democratic	Richard Pan (incumbent)	212,903	69.5
No party preference	Eric Frame	93,217	30.5
Total votes		306,120	100.0
Democratic hold			

== District 8 ==
The 8th district stretches from the Sacramento suburbs to Death Valley. It encompasses most of the southern Sierra Nevada, Gold Country, and parts of the Central Valley, including parts of Fresno, Clovis, and Turlock. The incumbent was Republican Tom Berryhill, who was term-limited and could not run for reelection.

=== Candidates ===
- Mark Belden (no party preference), businessman
- Andreas Borgeas (Republican), Fresno County supervisor
- Paulina Miranda (Democratic), businesswoman and nominee for California's 8th State Senate district in 2014
- Tom Pratt (Democratic), Vallecito Union School board member and insurance agent

=== Results ===
California's 8th State Senate district, 2018
Primary election
Party	Candidate	Votes	%
Republican	Andreas Borgeas	117,673	59.4
Democratic	Paulina Miranda	42,044	21.2
Democratic	Tom Pratt	30,984	15.6
No party preference	Mark Belden	7,304	3.7
Total votes		198,005	100.0
General election
Republican	Andreas Borgeas	202,741	59.6
Democratic	Paulina Miranda	137,311	40.4
Total votes		340,052	100.0
Republican hold			

== District 10 ==
The 10th district is located in the southern coastal East Bay and parts of Silicon Valley, including Hayward and Milpitas. The incumbent was Democrat Bob Wieckowski, who was elected with 68.0% of the vote in 2014.

=== Candidates ===
- Victor G. San Vicente (Republican), real estate and mortgage broker
- Ali Sarsack (Libertarian), military veteran and design engineer
- Bob Wieckowski (Democratic), incumbent state senator

=== Results ===
California's 10th State Senate district, 2018
Primary election
Party	Candidate	Votes	%
Democratic	Bob Wieckowski (incumbent)	102,122	71.5
Republican	Victor G. San Vicente	34,357	24.0
Libertarian	Ali Sarsak	6,420	4.5
Total votes		142,899	100.0
General election
Democratic	Bob Wieckowski (incumbent)	205,239	75.6
Republican	Victor G. San Vicente	66,156	24.4
Total votes		271,395	100.0
Democratic hold			

== District 12 ==
The 12th district takes in the Salinas Valley and a swath of the Central Valley between Modesto and Fresno. The incumbent was Republican Anthony Cannella, who was term-limited and could not run for reelection.

=== Candidates ===
- Anna Caballero (Democratic), state assemblywoman for California's 30th State Assembly district, former Salinas mayor and city councilwoman
- Daniel Parra (Democratic), candidate for California's 21st congressional district in 2016
- Rob Poythress (Republican), Madera County supervisor and former Madera mayor and city councilman
- Johnny Tacherra (Republican), nominee for California's 16th congressional district in 2014 and 2016

=== Results ===
California's 12th State Senate district, 2018
Primary election
Party	Candidate	Votes	%
Democratic	Anna Caballero	46,970	43.3
Republican	Rob Poythress	28,512	26.3
Republican	Johnny Tacherra	24,088	22.2
Democratic	Daniel Parra	8,740	8.1
Democratic	Dennis J. Brazil (write-in)	208	0.2
Total votes		108,518	100.0
General election
Democratic	Anna Caballero	110,386	54.4
Republican	Rob Poythress	92,691	45.6
Total votes		203,077	100.0
Democratic gain from Republican			

== District 14 ==
The 14th district takes in parts of the southern Central Valley. It takes in heavily Latino portions of Fresno and Bakersfield, along with Delano, Hanford, and Porterville. The incumbent was Republican Andy Vidak, who was reelected with 54.1% of the vote in 2014.

=== Candidates ===
- Melissa Hurtado (Democratic), Sanger city councilwoman
- Ruben Macareno (Democratic), former chairman of Tulare County Democratic Central Committee
- Abigail Solis (Democratic), Earlimart School District trustee
- Andy Vidak (Republican), incumbent state senator

=== Results ===
California's 14th State Senate district, 2018
Primary election
Party	Candidate	Votes	%
Republican	Andy Vidak (incumbent)	37,918	54.1
Democratic	Melissa Hurtado	16,295	23.2
Democratic	Abigail Solis	10,413	14.9
Democratic	Ruben Macareno	5,464	7.8
Total votes		70,090	100.0
General election
Democratic	Melissa Hurtado	80,942	55.8
Republican	Andy Vidak (incumbent)	64,131	44.2
Total votes		145,073	100.0
Democratic gain from Republican			

== District 16 ==
The 16th district consists of the southeastern Central Valley and the High Desert. Much of the population is in the western parts of the district in the Central Valley, anchored by Bakersfield and Visalia, while the desert regions in the eastern half consist of scattered settlements, such as Barstow and Yucca Valley. The incumbent was Republican minority Senate leader Jean Fuller, who was term-limited and could not run for reelection.

=== Candidates ===
- Shannon Grove (Republican), former state assemblywoman for California's 34th State Assembly district
- Ruth Musser-Lopez (Democratic), archaeologist, former Needles city councilwoman, and nominee for California's 16th State Senate district in 2014
- Gregory Tatum (Republican), church pastor

=== Results ===
California's 16th State Senate district, 2018
Primary election
Party	Candidate	Votes	%
Republican	Shannon Grove	90,353	59.1
Democratic	Ruth Musser-Lopez	44,303	29.0
Republican	Gregory Tatum	18,152	11.9
Total votes		152,808	100.0
General election
Republican	Shannon Grove	169,714	64.2
Democratic	Ruth Musser-Lopez	94,579	35.8
Total votes		264,293	100.0
Republican hold			

== District 18 ==
The 18th district consists of the eastern San Fernando Valley, including parts of Burbank, as well as the Los Angeles neighborhoods of Northridge, Sherman Oaks, and Van Nuys. The incumbent was Democrat Robert Hertzberg, who was elected with 70.2% of the vote in 2014.

=== Candidates ===
- Robert Hertzberg (Democratic), incumbent state senator
- Rudy Melendez (Republican)
- Brandon Saario (Republican)
- Roger James Sayegh (Democratic)

=== Results ===
California's 18th State Senate district, 2018
Primary election
Party	Candidate	Votes	%
Democratic	Robert Hertzberg (incumbent)	72,462	66.3
Republican	Rudy Melendez	12,564	11.5
Democratic	Roger James Sayegh	12,238	11.2
Republican	Brandon Saario	12,048	11.0
Total votes		109,312	100.0
General election
Democratic	Robert Hertzberg (incumbent)	195,623	78.1
Republican	Rudy Melendez	54,888	21.9
Total votes		250,511	100.0
Democratic hold			

== District 20 ==
The 20th district encompasses parts of the Inland Empire, including Chino, Fontana, Ontario, and parts of San Bernardino. The incumbent was Democrat Connie Leyva, who was elected with 62.4% of the vote in 2014.

=== Candidates ===
- Paul Vincent Avila (Democratic), former Ontario city councilman
- Connie Leyva (Democratic), incumbent state senator
- Matthew Munson (Republican), inventory processor and nominee for California's 20th State Senate district in 2014

=== Results ===
California's 20th State Senate district, 2018
Primary election
Party	Candidate	Votes	%
Democratic	Connie Leyva (incumbent)	40,112	47.0
Republican	Matthew Munson	30,233	35.4
Democratic	Paul Vincent Avila	14,985	17.6
Total votes		85,330	100.0
General election
Democratic	Connie Leyva (incumbent)	137,748	69.5
Republican	Matthew Munson	60,578	30.5
Total votes		198,326	100.0
Democratic hold			

== District 22 ==
The 22nd district is located in the southern coastal encompasses the San Gabriel Valley and parts of the foothills. The incumbent was Democrat Ed Hernandez, who was term-limited and could not run for reelection.

=== Candidates ===
- Mike Eng (Democratic), Los Angeles Community College District trustee, former assemblyman for California's 49th State Assembly district, and former mayor of Monterey Park
- Monica Garcia (Democratic), Baldwin Park city councilwoman
- Susan Rubio (Democratic), Baldwin Park city councilwoman
- Ruben Sierra (Democratic), union organizer

=== Results ===
California's 22nd State Senate district, 2018
Primary election
Party	Candidate	Votes	%
Democratic	Mike Eng	38,051	45.3
Democratic	Susan Rubio	22,136	26.4
Democratic	Monica Garcia	17,404	20.7
Democratic	Ruben Sierra	6,377	7.6
Total votes		83,968	100.0
General election
Democratic	Susan Rubio	101,936	52.3
Democratic	Mike Eng	93,018	47.7
Total votes		194,954	100.0
Democratic hold			

== District 24 ==
The 24th district encompasses central Los Angeles and its immediate environs, including East Los Angeles, Eagle Rock, and Koreatown. The incumbent was Democratic State Senate President pro tempore Kevin de León, who was term-limited and could not run for reelection.

=== Candidates ===
- Peter Choi (Democratic), small business owner and nominee for California's 24th State Senate district in 2014
- Maria Elena Durazo (Democratic), co-chair of AFL–CIO's immigration committee and vice-chair of Democratic National Committee

=== Results ===
California's 24th State Senate district, 2018
Primary election
Party	Candidate	Votes	%
Democratic	Maria Elena Durazo	63,719	69.8
Democratic	Peter Choi	27,566	30.2
Total votes		91,285	100.0
General election
Democratic	Maria Elena Durazo	139,473	66.9
Democratic	Peter Choi	69,160	33.1
Total votes		208,633	100.0
Democratic hold			

== District 26 ==
The 26th district is centered around the South Bay and Westside regions. The incumbent was Democrat Ben Allen, who was elected with 60.3% of the vote in 2014.

=== Candidates ===
- Ben Allen (Democratic), incumbent state senator
- Baron Bruno (no party preference), realtor and Libertarian nominee for California's 62nd State Assembly district in 2016
- Mark Matthew Herd (Libertarian), Westwood neighborhood councilman

=== Results ===
California's 26th State Senate district, 2018
Primary election
Party	Candidate	Votes	%
Democratic	Ben Allen (incumbent)	144,283	76.8
No party preference	Baron Bruno	23,119	12.3
Libertarian	Mark Matthew Herd	20,534	10.9
Total votes		187,936	100.0
General election
Democratic	Ben Allen (incumbent)	298,609	77.2
No party preference	Baron Bruno	87,974	22.8
Total votes		386,583	100.0
Democratic hold			

== District 28 ==
The 28th district is located in eastern Riverside County, including Cathedral City, Murrieta, Palm Springs, and Temecula. The incumbent was Republican Jeff Stone, who was elected with 53.0% of the vote in 2014.

=== Candidates ===
- Anna Nevenic (Democratic), registered nurse, candidate for California's 41st congressional district in 2012, and candidate for California's 28th State Senate district in 2014
- Joy Silver (Democratic), affordable housing advisor
- Jeff Stone (Republican), incumbent state senator

=== Results ===
California's 28th State Senate district, 2018
Primary election
Party	Candidate	Votes	%
Republican	Jeff Stone (incumbent)	89,426	56.0
Democratic	Joy Silver	55,312	34.7
Democratic	Anna Nevenic	14,826	9.3
Total votes		159,564	100.0
General election
Republican	Jeff Stone (incumbent)	151,020	51.6
Democratic	Joy Silver	141,792	48.4
Total votes		292,812	100.0
Republican hold			

== District 30 ==
The 30th district is located in Los Angeles County including Culver City, Ladera Heights, Westmont and the Los Angeles neighborhoods of Crenshaw, Downtown, and Florence. The incumbent was Democrat Holly Mitchell, who was reelected with 68.8% of the vote in 2014.

=== Candidates ===
- Holly Mitchell (Democratic), incumbent state senator

=== Results ===
California's 30th State Senate district, 2018
Primary election
Party	Candidate	Votes	%
Democratic	Holly Mitchell (incumbent)	93,078	100.0
Total votes		93,078	100.0
General election
Democratic	Holly Mitchell (incumbent)	230,623	100.0
Total votes		230,623	100.0
Democratic hold			

== District 32 ==
The 32nd district takes in the Gateway Cities region in southeastern Los Angeles County, as well as Buena Park. The incumbent was Democrat Tony Mendoza, who was elected with 52.3% of the vote in 2014, resigned following sexual assault allegations. However, he decided to run for election again following his resignation.

Note that the primary was held the same day as the special election to fill a vacancy in the seat. Although most of the candidates in the two contests were the same, the results were very different. Rita Topalian finished first in both races, but different candidates finished in second place. Vanessa Delgado finished in second place in the special election, but third place in the regularly scheduled primary election. She received a similar number of votes in both races, but candidate Bob Archuleta received about 54% more votes in the regularly scheduled election than he did in the special election. The different results have been attributed to the different order in which the candidates were listed on the ballot.

=== Candidates ===
- Bob Archuleta (Democratic), Pico Rivera city councilman
- Rudy Bermudez (Democratic), former assemblyman for California's 56th State Assembly district (2002–2006) and former Norwalk city councilman
- David Castellanos (Democratic)
- Vanessa Delgado (Democratic), mayor of Montebello
- Tony Mendoza (Democratic), former state senator for California's 32nd State Senate district
- Vivian Romero (Democratic), Montebello city councilwoman
- Vicky Santana (Democratic), vice president of Rio Hondo College board
- Ion Sarega (Republican), former candidate for La Mirada city council
- Ali S. Taj (Democratic), Artesia city councilman
- Rita Topalian (Republican), attorney and nominee for California's 57th State Assembly district in 2014 and 2016

=== Results ===
California's 32nd State Senate district, 2018
Primary election
Party	Candidate	Votes	%
Republican	Rita Topalian	28,979	24.4
Democratic	Bob Archuleta	20,652	17.4
Democratic	Vanessa Delgado (incumbent)	18,709	15.7
Democratic	Tony Mendoza	11,917	10.0
Republican	Ion Sarega	11,577	9.7
Democratic	Vicky Santana	8,236	6.9
Democratic	Ali S. Taj	6,349	5.3
Democratic	Vivian Romero	5,495	4.6
Democratic	Rudy Bermudez	5,455	4.6
Democratic	David Castellanos	1,541	1.3
Total votes		118,910	100.0
General election
Democratic	Bob Archuleta	177,054	66.9
Republican	Rita Topalian	87,520	33.1
Total votes		264,574	100.0
Democratic hold			

== District 34 ==
The 34th district is centered around western Orange County, including parts of Anaheim, as well as Garden Grove and Santa Ana. The district also takes in coastal areas, including parts of Huntington Beach and Long Beach. The incumbent was Republican Janet Nguyen, who was elected with 58.1% of the vote in 2014.

=== Candidates ===
- Akash A. Hawkins (Democratic)
- Janet Nguyen (Republican), incumbent state senator
- Jestin L. Samson (Democratic), local activist
- Tom Umberg (Democratic), former state assemblyman for California's 69th State Assembly district (2004–2006) and California's 72nd State Assembly district (1990–1992)

=== Endorsements ===
Tom Umberg (D)

U.S. representatives

- Lou Correa, U.S. representative (D-CA-46)
- Ted Lieu, U.S. representative (D-CA-33)
- Adam Schiff, U.S. representative (D-CA-28)

State-level officials

- Tom Daly, California state assemblyman (D-69)
- Betty Yee, state controller of California

Local-level officials

- Jim Adams, Los Angeles/Orange Counties Building & Construction Trades Council representative
- Rand Beers, Asst. U.S. Secretary of State & Deputy Secretary Of Homeland Security
- Louis E. Caldera, former U.S. Secretary of the Army
- Joe Dunn, former California state senator
- Bob Foster, former mayor of Long Beach
- Zeke Hernandez, Rancho Santiago Community College District Board member
- Dan Jacobson, Democratic Foundation Of Orange County chairman
- Betty Karnette, former California Ssate senator
- Paul Koretz, Los Angeles City councilman
- Bill Lockyer, former attorney general of California
- Miguel Pulido, mayor of Santa Ana
- Marti Schrank, former Orange County Democratic Party vice chairwoman

=== Results ===
2018 California's 34th State Senate primary results by county:
Nguyen—50–60%
Nguyen—40–50%

2018 California's 34th State Senate general election results by county:
Umberg—50–60%
Nguyen—50–60%

California's 34th State Senate district, 2018
Primary election
Party	Candidate	Votes	%
Republican	Janet Nguyen (incumbent)	82,874	58.3
Democratic	Tom Umberg	37,360	26.3
Democratic	Jestin L. Samson	13,231	9.3
Democratic	Akash A. Hawkins	8,746	6.2
Total votes		142,211	100.0
General election
Democratic	Tom Umberg	135,062	50.6
Republican	Janet Nguyen (incumbent)	131,973	49.4
Total votes		267,035	100.0
Democratic gain from Republican			

General election results by county

General election results by county. Blue represents counties won by Umberg. Red represents counties won by Nguyen.

County	Nguyen (R)		Umberg (D)		Total
County	Votes	%	Votes	%	Votes
Los Angeles	13,848	45.0%	16,939	55.0%	30,787
Orange	118,125	50.0%	118,123	50.0%	236,248
Totals	131,973	49.4%	135,062	50.6%	267,035

== District 36 ==
The 36th district encompasses southern Orange County and the North County region of San Diego County. The incumbent was Republican Patricia Bates, who was elected with 65.7% of the vote in 2014.

=== Candidates ===
- Patricia Bates (Republican), incumbent state senator
- Marggie Castellano (Democratic), businesswoman

=== Results ===
California's 36th State Senate district, 2018
Primary election
Party	Candidate	Votes	%
Republican	Patricia Bates (incumbent)	124,966	54.4
Democratic	Marggie Castellano	104,791	45.6
Total votes		229,757	100.0
General election
Republican	Patricia Bates (incumbent)	203,607	51.5
Democratic	Marggie Castellano	191,392	48.5
Total votes		394,999	100.0
Republican hold			

== District 38 ==
The 38th district encompasses the East County and inland region of San Diego County. The incumbent was Republican Joel Anderson, who was term-limited and could not run for reelection.

=== Candidates ===
- Jeff Griffith (Democratic), firefighter and paramedic
- Brian Jones (Republican), Santee city councilman and former state assemblyman for California's 77th State Assembly district (2010–2012) and California's 71st State Assembly district (2012–2016)
- Antonio Salguero (Libertarian)

=== Results ===
California's 38th State Senate district, 2018
Primary election
Party	Candidate	Votes	%
Republican	Brian Jones	114,270	57.2
Democratic	Jeff Griffith	79,862	40.0
Libertarian	Antonio Salguero	5,576	2.8
Total votes		199,708	100.0
General election
Republican	Brian Jones	187,345	53.0
Democratic	Jeff Griffith	166,092	47.0
Total votes		353,437	100.0
Republican hold			

== District 40 ==
The 40th district runs along the entire border between California and Mexico, taking in rural Imperial County as well as the South Bay region of San Diego County. The incumbent was Democrat Ben Hueso, who was reelected with 54.9% of the vote in 2014.

=== Candidates ===
- Ben Hueso (Democratic), incumbent state senator
- Luis R. Vargas (Republican), former California superior court judge

=== Results ===
California's 40th State Senate district, 2018
Primary election
Party	Candidate	Votes	%
Democratic	Ben Hueso (incumbent)	70,649	60.1
Republican	Luis R. Vargas	46,850	39.9
Total votes		117,499	100.0
General election
Democratic	Ben Hueso (incumbent)	152,896	65.9
Republican	Luis R. Vargas	79,207	34.1
Total votes		232,103	100.0
Democratic hold			

== See also ==
- 2018 United States elections
- 2018 United States Senate election in California
- 2018 United States House of Representatives elections in California
- 2018 California gubernatorial election
- 2018 California State Assembly election
- 2018 California elections
