= California's 14th senatorial district =

American legislative district

California's 14th State Senate district
Current senator
Anna Caballero; D–Merced
- Population (2010) • Voting age • Citizen voting age: 935,376; 623,635; 410,500
- Demographics: 17.87% White; 4.75% Black; 71.16% Latino; 4.74% Asian; 0.83% Native American; 0.11% Hawaiian/Pacific Islander; 0.26% other; 0.29% remainder of multiracial
- Registered voters: 326,981
- Registration: 44.51% Democratic; 25.23% Republican; 24.41% No party preference

California's 14th senatorial district is one of 40 California State Senate districts. It is currently represented by Democrat Anna M. Caballero of Merced.

== District profile ==
The district takes in the western portion of the Central Valley, including Merced County and western Fresno County.

== Election results from statewide races ==
Year	Office	Results
2021	Recall	No 54.4 – 45.6%
2020	President	Biden 57.8 – 40.0%
2018	Governor	Newsom 56.0 – 44.0%
2018	Senator	de Leon 55.3 – 44.7%
2016	President	Clinton 58.7 – 36.0%
2016	Senator	Sanchez 56.0 – 44.0%
2014	Governor	Brown 55.5 – 44.5%
2012	President	Obama 58.3 – 39.8%
2012	Senator	Feinstein 59.0 – 41.0%

== List of senators representing the district ==
Due to redistricting, the 14th district has been moved around different parts of the state. The current iteration resulted from the 2021 redistricting by the California Citizens Redistricting Commission.

Senators	Party	Years served	Electoral history	Counties represented
Henry Vrooman	Republican	January 8, 1883 – January 3, 1887	Vrooman and Whitney served together.	Alameda
George E. Whitney	Republican	January 8, 1883 – January 3, 1887	Vrooman and Whitney served together.	Alameda
Anthony Caminetti	Democratic	January 3, 1887 – January 5, 1891		Amador, Calaveras
Edward Converse Voorheis	Republican	January 5, 1891 – January 2, 1899		Amador, Calaveras
Edward Converse Voorheis	Republican	January 5, 1891 – January 2, 1899		Alpine, Amador, Calaveras, Mono
John F. Davis	Republican	January 2, 1899 – January 5, 1903		Alpine, Amador, Calaveras, Mono
Joseph R. Knowland	Republican	January 5, 1903 – September 28, 1904	Resigned from the Senate to run for the 3rd Congressional district.	Alameda
Vacant		September 28, 1904 – January 2, 1905		Alameda
M. W. Simpson	Republican	January 2, 1905 – January 7, 1907		Alameda
Joseph Clement Bates Jr.	Republican	January 7, 1907 – January 2, 1911		Alameda
George Jacob Hans	Republican	January 2, 1911 – January 6, 1919		Alameda
Edwin Mastic Otis	Republican	January 6, 1919 – January 8, 1923		Alameda
T. C. West	Republican	January 8, 1923 – January 5, 1931		Alameda
Roy Fellom	Republican	January 5, 1931 – January 7, 1935		San Francisco
Walter McGovern	Republican	January 7, 1935 – January 2, 1939		San Francisco
John F. Shelley	Democratic	January 2, 1939 – January 6, 1947		San Francisco
Gerald J. O'Gara	Democratic	January 6, 1947 – January 3, 1955		San Francisco
Robert I. McCarthy	Democratic	January 3, 1955 – January 5, 1959		San Francisco
J. Eugene McAteer	Democratic	January 5, 1959 – January 2, 1967		San Francisco
Clark L. Bradley	Republican	January 2, 1967 – November 30, 1974		Santa Clara, Alameda
George N. Zenovich	Democratic	December 2, 1974 – March 22, 1979	Resigned from the Senate.	Fresno, Madera, Mariposa, Merced, Stanislaus
Vacant		March 22, 1979 – June 26, 1979		Fresno, Madera, Mariposa, Merced, Stanislaus
Kenneth L. Maddy	Republican	June 26, 1979 – November 30, 1998	Sworn in after winning special election.	Fresno, Madera, Mariposa, Merced, Stanislaus
Kenneth L. Maddy	Republican	June 26, 1979 – November 30, 1998	Sworn in after winning special election.	Fresno, Madera, Mariposa, Merced, Monterey, San Luis Obispo, Santa Barbara
Kenneth L. Maddy	Republican	June 26, 1979 – November 30, 1998	Sworn in after winning special election.	Fresno, Kern, Tulare
Chuck Poochigian	Republican	December 7, 1998 – November 30, 2006	Elected in 1998. Re-elected in 2002. Unsuccessfully ran for Attorney General in 2006.	Fresno, Kern, Tulare
Chuck Poochigian	Republican	December 7, 1998 – November 30, 2006	Elected in 1998. Re-elected in 2002. Unsuccessfully ran for Attorney General in 2006.	Fresno, Madera, Mariposa, San Joaquin, Stanislaus, Tuolumne
Dave Cogdill	Republican	December 4, 2006 – November 30, 2010	Elected in 2006. Retired.	Fresno, Madera, Mariposa, San Joaquin, Stanislaus, Tuolumne
Tom Berryhill	Republican	December 6, 2010 – November 30, 2014	Elected in 2010; Redistricted to the 8th district.	Fresno, Madera, Mariposa, San Joaquin, Stanislaus, Tuolumne
Andy Vidak	Republican	December 1, 2014 – November 30, 2018	Redistricted from the 16th district. Re-elected in 2014. Lost re-election.	Fresno, Kern, Kings, Tulare
Melissa Hurtado (Sanger)	Democratic	December 3, 2018 – November 30, 2022	Elected in 2018. Redistricted to the 16th district.	Fresno, Kern, Kings, Tulare
Anna Caballero (Merced)	Democratic	December 3, 2022 – present	Redistricted from the 12th district. Re-elected in 2022.	Fresno, Madera, Merced

== Election results (1990-present) ==
=== 2022 ===
2022 California State Senate 14th district election
Primary election
Party	Candidate	Votes	%
Democratic	Anna Caballero (incumbent)	47,488	52.0
Republican	Amnon Shor	38,244	41.9
Democratic	Paulina Miranda	5,530	6.1
Total votes		91,262	100.0
General election
Democratic	Anna Caballero (incumbent)	90,016	56.3
Republican	Amnon Shor	69,970	43.7
Total votes		159,986	100.0
Democratic hold			

=== 2018 ===
2018 California State Senate 14th district election
Primary election
Party	Candidate	Votes	%
Republican	Andy Vidak (incumbent)	37,918	54.1
Democratic	Melissa Hurtado	16,295	23.2
Democratic	Abigail Solis	10,413	14.9
Democratic	Ruben Macareno	5,464	7.8
Total votes		70,090	100.0
General election
Democratic	Melissa Hurtado	80,942	55.8
Republican	Andy Vidak (incumbent)	64,131	44.2
Total votes		145,073	100.0
Democratic gain from Republican			

=== 2014 ===
2014 California State Senate 14th district election
Primary election
Party	Candidate	Votes	%
Republican	Andy Vidak (incumbent)	35,953	61.2
Democratic	Luis Chavez	22,771	38.8
Total votes		58,724	100.0
General election
Republican	Andy Vidak (incumbent)	54,251	54.1
Democratic	Luis Chavez	46,035	45.9
Total votes		100,286	100.0
Republican hold			

=== 2010 ===
2010 California State Senate 14th district election
Party	Candidate	Votes	%
Republican	Tom Berryhill	191,097	66.4
Democratic	Larry Johnson	96,835	33.6
Total votes		287,932	100.0
Republican hold			

=== 2006 ===
2006 California State Senate 14th district election
Party	Candidate	Votes	%
Republican	Dave Cogdill	167,804	67.0
Democratic	Wesley Firch	82,679	33.0
Total votes		250,483	100.0
Republican hold			

=== 2002 ===
2002 California State Senate 14th district election
Party	Candidate	Votes	%
Republican	Chuck Poochigian (incumbent)	175,369	100.0
Total votes		175,369	100.0
Republican hold			

=== 1998 ===
1998 California State Senate 14th district election
Party	Candidate	Votes	%
Republican	Chuck Poochigian	174,832	100.0
Total votes		174,832	100.0
Republican hold			

=== 1994 ===
1994 California State Senate 14th district election
Party	Candidate	Votes	%
Republican	Kenneth L. Maddy (incumbent)	168,017	70.6
Democratic	Tony Hagopian	69,891	29.4
Total votes		237,098	100.0
Republican hold			

=== 1990 ===
1990 California State Senate 14th district election
Party	Candidate	Votes	%
Republican	Kenneth L. Maddy (incumbent)	135,369	100.0
Total votes		135,369	100.0
Republican hold			

== See also ==
- California State Senate
- California State Senate districts
- Districts in California
