= 2006 California State Senate election =

- November 7, 2006

20 seats from even-numbered districts in the California State Senate 21 seats needed for a majority
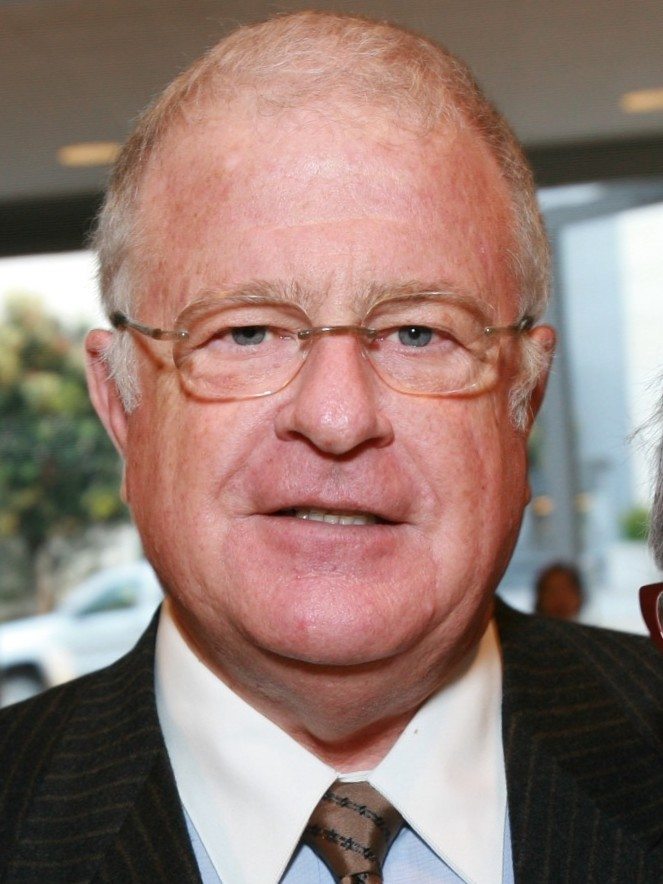

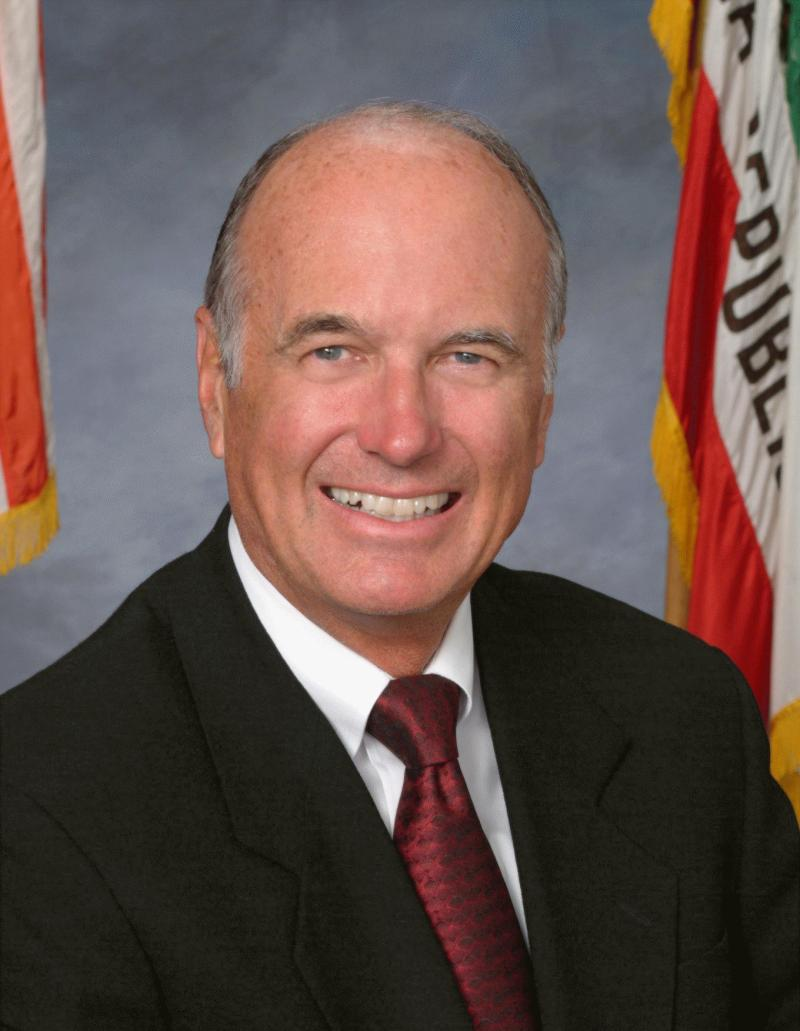
	Majority party	Minority party
Leader	Don Perata	Dick Ackerman
Party	Democratic	Republican
Leader's seat	9th–Oakland	33rd–Irvine
Last election	25	15
Seats won	25	15
Seat change	Steady	Steady
Popular vote	1,903,307	1,450,607
Percentage	54.19%	41.30%
- Results: Democratic hold Republican hold No election held
President pro tempore before election
Don Perata
Democratic
President pro tempore designate
Don Perata
Democratic

The 2006 California State Senate elections were held on November 7, 2006. Voters in the 20 even-numbered districts of the California State Senate voted for their representatives. The California Democratic Party retained its majority and its 25 seats. The California Republican Party retained control of the remaining 15 seats. Neither party lost nor gained any seats.

== Overview ==
California State Senate elections, 2006
Party	Votes	Percentage	Not up	Incumbents	Open	Before	After
Democratic	1,903,307	54.19%	11	4	10	25	25
Republican	1,450,607	41.30%	9	4	2	15	15
Libertarian	138,669	3.95%	0	0	0	0	0
Green	13,443	0.38%	0	0	0	0	0
Peace and Freedom	5,573	0.16%	0	0	0	0	0
Independent	911	0.03%	0	0	0	0	0
Totals	3,512,510	100.00%	20	8	12	40	40

== Predictions ==
Source	Ranking	As of
Rothenberg	Safe D	November 4, 2006

== Results ==
Final results from the California Secretary of State:

=== District 2 ===
California's 2nd State Senate district election, 2006
Party	Candidate	Votes	%
Democratic	Pat Wiggins	173,053	65.71
Republican	Lawrence Wiesner	97,611	34.29
Total votes		284,646	100.00
Democratic hold			

=== District 4 ===
California's 4th State Senate district election, 2006
Party	Candidate	Votes	%
Republican	Sam Aanestad (incumbent)	182,494	60.91
Democratic	Paul Singh	99,293	33.14
Libertarian	Tony Munroe	9,300	3.10
Green	Robert Vizzard	8,520	2.84
Total votes		299,607	100.00
Republican hold			

=== District 6 ===
California's 6th State Senate district election, 2006
Party	Candidate	Votes	%
Democratic	Darrell Steinberg	115,628	58.69
Republican	Paul Green	71,051	36.06
Peace and Freedom	C. T. Weber	5,573	2.83
Libertarian	Alana Garberoglio	4,774	2.42
Total votes		197,026	100.00
Democratic hold			

=== District 8 ===
California's 8th State Senate district election, 2006
Party	Candidate	Votes	%
Democratic	Leland Yee	179,556	77.99
Republican	Michael Skipakevich	50,670	22.01
Total votes		230,226	100.00
Democratic hold			

=== District 10 ===
California's 10th State Senate district election, 2006
Party	Candidate	Votes	%
Democratic	Ellen Corbett	136,846	73.38
Republican	Lou Filipovich	49,638	26.62
Total votes		186,484	100.00
Democratic hold			

=== District 12 ===
California's 12th State Senate district election, 2006
Party	Candidate	Votes	%
Republican	Jeff Denham (incumbent)	92,879	59.76
Democratic	Wiley Nickel	62,539	40.24
Total votes		155,418	100.00
Republican hold			

=== District 14 ===
California's 14th State Senate district election, 2006
Party	Candidate	Votes	%
Republican	Dave Cogdill	167,804	66.99
Democratic	Wesley Firch	82,679	33.01
Total votes		250,483	100.00
Republican hold			

=== District 16 ===
California's 16th State Senate district election, 2006
Party	Candidate	Votes	%
Democratic	Dean Florez (incumbent)	78,146	100.00
Total votes		78,146	100.00
Democratic hold			

=== District 18 ===
California's 18th State Senate district election, 2006
Party	Candidate	Votes	%
Republican	Roy Ashburn (incumbent)	147,767	69.74
Democratic	Fred Davis	59,187	27.93
Green	Matthew Rick	4,923	2.32
Total votes		211,877	100.00
Republican hold			

=== District 20 ===
California's 20th State Senate district election, 2006
Party	Candidate	Votes	%
Democratic	Alex Padilla	84,459	74.85
Libertarian	Pamela Brown	28,377	25.15
Total votes		112,836	100.00
Democratic hold			

=== District 22 ===
California's 22nd State Senate district election, 2006
Party	Candidate	Votes	%
Democratic	Gilbert Cedillo (incumbent)	71,199	76.35
Republican	Mike Ten	18,581	19.93
Libertarian	Murray Levy	3,469	3.72
Total votes		93,249	100.00
Democratic hold			

=== District 24 ===
California's 24th State Senate district election, 2006
Party	Candidate	Votes	%
Democratic	Gloria Romero (incumbent)	92,498	74.07
Republican	Robert Carver	32,388	25.93
Total votes		124,886	100.00
Democratic hold			

=== District 26 ===
California's 26th State Senate district election, 2006
Party	Candidate	Votes	%
Democratic	Mark Ridley-Thomas	133,309	89.09
Libertarian	Bud Raymond	16,317	10.91
Total votes		149,626	100.00
Democratic hold			

=== District 28 ===
California's 28th State Senate district election, 2006
Party	Candidate	Votes	%
Democratic	Jenny Oropeza	129,151	61.73
Republican	Cherryl Liddle	72,570	34.69
Libertarian	Peter De Baets	7,485	3.58
Total votes		209,206	100.00
Democratic hold			

=== District 30 ===
California's 30th State Senate district election, 2006
Party	Candidate	Votes	%
Democratic	Ron Calderon	93,436	70.91
Republican	Selma Minerd	38,340	29.09
Total votes		131,776	100.00
Democratic hold			

=== District 32 ===
California's 32nd State Senate district election, 2006
Party	Candidate	Votes	%
Democratic	Gloria Negrete McLeod	85,301	100.00
Total votes		85,301	100.00
Democratic hold			

=== District 34 ===
California's 34th State Senate district election, 2006
Party	Candidate	Votes	%
Democratic	Lou Correa	56,534	50.21
Republican	Lynn Daucher	55,142	48.98
Independent	Otto Bade (write-in)	911	0.81
Total votes		112,587	100.00
Democratic hold			

=== District 36 ===
California's 36th State Senate district election, 2006
Party	Candidate	Votes	%
Republican	Dennis Hollingsworth (incumbent)	164,025	63.40
Democratic	Mark Hanson	85,706	33.13
Libertarian	Joseph Shea	9,001	3.48
Total votes		258,732	100.00
Republican hold			

=== District 38 ===
California's 38th State Senate district election, 2006
Party	Candidate	Votes	%
Republican	Mark Wyland	162,046	74.33
Libertarian	Brian Klea	55,964	25.67
Total votes		218,010	100.00
Republican hold			

=== District 40 ===
California's 40th State Senate district election, 2006
Party	Candidate	Votes	%
Democratic	Denise Ducheny (incumbent)	84,787	62.17
Republican	David Walden	47,601	34.91
Libertarian	Jesse Thomas	3,982	2.92
Total votes		136,370	100.00
Democratic hold			

== See also ==
- California State Assembly elections, 2006
- California state elections, 2006
