= California Bicycle Coalition =

US non-profit organization

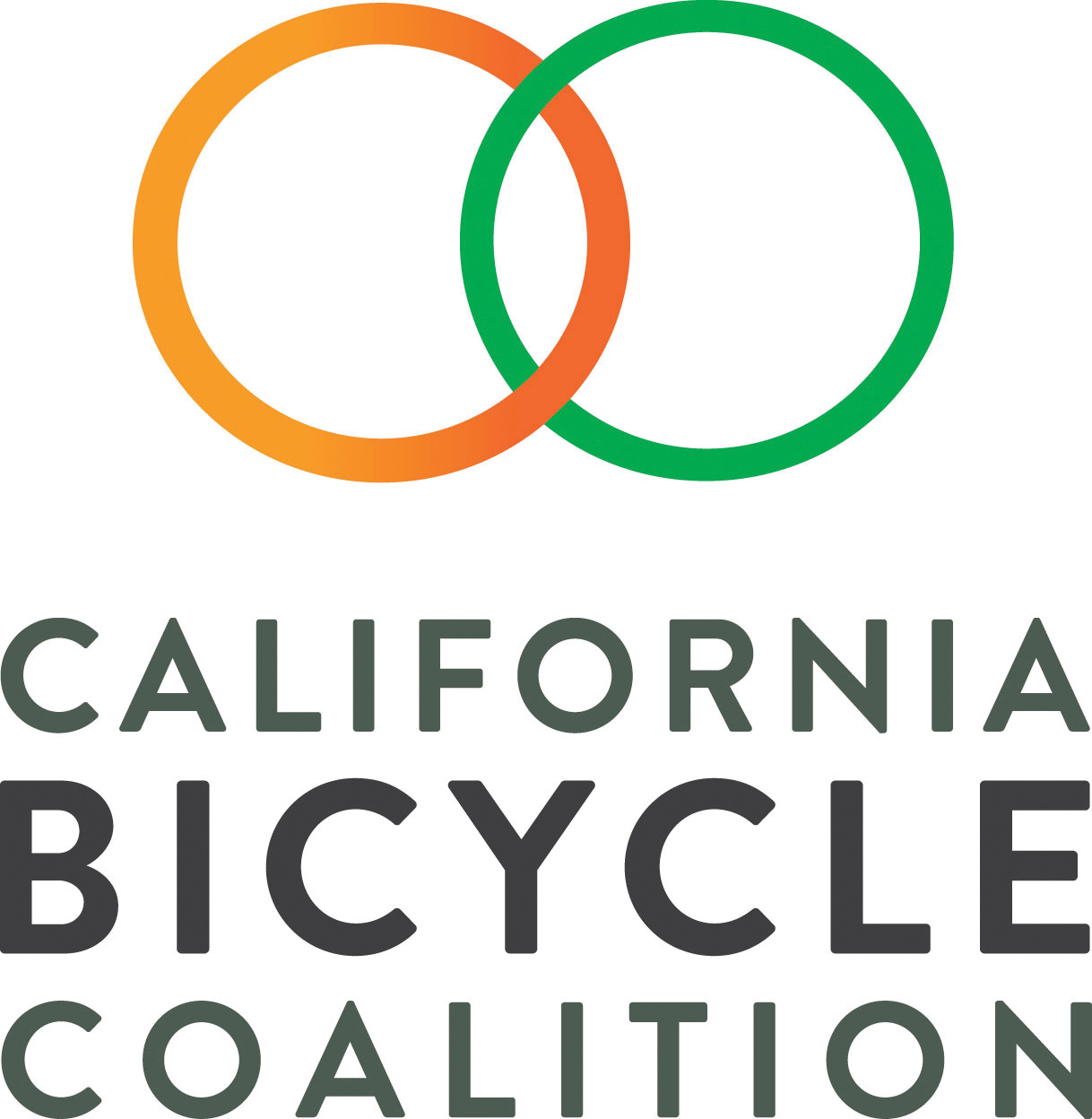
- Formation: 1994
- Type: Non-profit organization
- Purpose: Bicycling advocacy
- Headquarters: Sacramento, California
- Region served: California, United States
- Executive Director: Kendra Ramsey
- Website: calbike.org

California Bicycle Coalition, also known as CalBike, is an advocacy organization based in Sacramento that seeks to expand bicycling in the U.S. state of California. A related organization, the California Bicycle Coalition Education Fund, conducts solely charitable functions. The California Bicycle Coalition was founded in 1994.

== History ==
1994 The California Bicycle Coalition is established as a 501(c)(4) nonprofit corporation with a $10,000 grant from the Bicycle Federation of America.

1997 The California Bicycle Coalition writes and sponsors Assembly Bill 1020, which more than triples the funding allocated to the Bicycle Lane Account, the only California Department of Transportation account dedicated solely to bicycle projects.

1999 The California Bicycle Coalition co-sponsors Assembly Bill 1475, which invests $115,000,000 over five years in bicyclist and pedestrian safety projects near California schools, creating the nation's first statewide Safe Routes to School program.

The California Bicycle Coalition rewrites the bicycling section of the California Driver's Manual to better educate motorists about the presence of bicyclists on roads. The California Bicycle Coalition gets the DMV to include a question about bicyclists’ right to “take the lane” in the mix of those questions used on the exam.

2002 The California Bicycle Coalition sponsors the successful California Assembly Concurrent Resolution 211, which directs cities and counties to accommodate bicyclists in all transportation projects by implementing Caltrans Deputy Directive 64 and the U.S. Department of Transportation's design guidance document on integrating bicycling and walking when making road improvements.

2003 The California Bicycle Coalition fights for bike racks on buses by successfully amending the vehicle code, through Assembly Bill 1409, to allow buses in excess of 45′ in length to operate on California's highways. The California Bicycle Coalition also works on the “Bicycle Blueprint,” California's master plan for bicycling. The California Bicycle Coalition hosts the first biennial Walk Bike California Conference (which later became the California by Bike Summit) in Oakland.

2005 The California Bicycle Coalition hosts the second Walk Bike California Conference in Ventura.

2007 The California Bicycle Coalition introduces Assembly Bill 1358, The Complete Streets Act, to ensure that the transportation plans of California communities meet the needs of all users of the roadway including pedestrians, bicyclists, users of public transit, motorists, children, the elderly, and the disabled. AARP California joins the California Bicycle Coalition as the bill's co-sponsor. The California Bicycle Coalition supports Assembly Bill 57, which indefinitely extends California's Safe Routes to School program created in 1999. The California Bicycle Coalition hosts the third Walk Bike California Conference in Davis.

2008 Gov. Arnold Schwarzenegger signs AB 1358 into law and California becomes the largest state to embrace Complete Streets. Meanwhile, The California Bicycle Coalition continues to work closely with Caltrans as the agency revises Deputy Directive 64 (DD-64) to state clearly Caltrans’ intention to adhere to Complete Streets principles as a matter of policy.

2009 The California Bicycle Coalition successfully sponsors Assembly Bill 1464, which establishes within Caltrans a process for designating bicycle routes of regional, statewide and national significance.

2011 View the 2011 Legislative History

- Sponsored AB 345 requiring Caltrans to include non motorized representatives on its important Traffic Control Devices Committee. Caltrans implemented the legislation in January 2012.
- The California Bicycle Coalition establishes the Sacramento Legislative Bike Caucus, with co-chairs Senator Michael Rubio (Bakersfield) and Wes Chesbro (Arcata).
- Reformed the California Traffic Control Devices Committee to include two nonmotorized transportation experts in its ranks. As of February 2012, longtime bicycle advocates John Ciccarelli and Bryan Jones hold seats on the CTCDC.
- Single-handedly improved the transportation bill in the U.S. Senate thanks to a timely press action two days after Senator Boxer released the draft bill in November 2011.

Generated 1,500 support letters to the Governor for SB 910, the 3-foot passing bill, and developed a base of support of recreational bicyclists.

- Educated thousands of cyclists through the California Department of Public Health-funded Bike Safe California website, lunchtime seminars, safe cycling instructor trainings, and city planner workshops.
- Helped more than 100 city planners and engineers learn how to accommodate active transportation in their community plans through six workshops held throughout the state.
- Convened the California Bike Summit, bringing together more than 100 leaders of bicycling advocacy organizations from around the state to figure out how best to take the next, bigger steps toward a more bicycle-friendly California.

2012 View the 2012 Legislative History

- Successfully sponsored AB 819 authorizing Caltrans to establish an experimental process for allowing cities and counties to install and evaluate protected bike facilities like those described in the Urban Bikeway Design Guide from the National Association of City Transportation Officials.
- Successfully sponsored SB 1339 authorizing a 4-year pilot program in the San Francisco Bay Area to adopt a commute benefit requirement.
- Successfully supported AB 2245 to exempt Class II bikeways (i.e., bike lanes built in the roadway) from environmental review under the California Environmental Quality Act.

2013 View the 2013 Legislative History

- The California Bicycle Coalition won the “Three Feet for Safety Act” when the governor finally signed the bill specifying three feet as the safe amount of clearance motorists should provide when passing a bicycle.
- With a coordinated effort with their allies in active transportation, they celebrate a 35% increase in bike/ped funding.
- The California Bicycle Coalition eliminated an archaic regulation that made it hard to remove a traffic lane and replace it with a bike lane.
- Convened the , which received considerable media attention, brought together advocates from all over the state, and helped propel the bicycling movement forward
