= Andreas Borgeas =

American politician (born 1974)

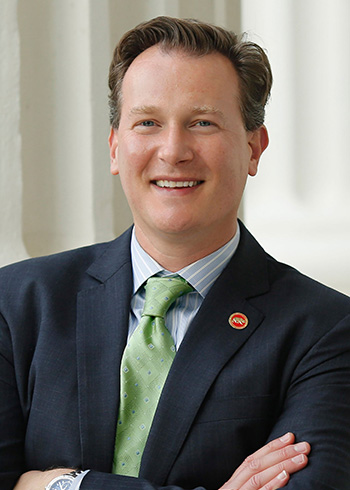

Member of the California State Senate from the 8th district
- In office December 3, 2018 – December 5, 2022
- Preceded by: Tom Berryhill
- Succeeded by: Angelique Ashby

Personal details
- Born: March 7, 1974 (age 52) Arizona, U.S.
- Party: Republican
- Spouse: Anna Hadjinlian
- Children: 2
- Education: California State University, Fresno (BA); Georgetown University (JD); Panteion University (PhD)
- Website: Official website

Andreas Borgeas (born March 7, 1974) is an American attorney, politician, and academic who served as a member of the California State Senate from the 8th district, which included parts of the Central Valley and the Sierra Nevada. Prior to being elected to the state Senate, he was a member of the Fresno County Board of Supervisors. He represented all or portions of Amador, Calaveras, Fresno, Inyo, Madera, Mariposa, Mono, Sacramento, Stanislaus, Tulare, and Tuolumne counties.

== Early life and education ==
Borgeas is a native of Arizona. He earned a Bachelor of Arts degree in political science from California State University, Fresno, a Juris Doctor from Georgetown University Law School, and a PhD in international affairs from Panteion University. He conducted his PhD field research in, and published extensively on, China and the neighboring Central Asian republics.

== Career ==
=== Academics and law ===
Borgeas conducted his PhD field research in, and published extensively on, China and the neighboring Central Asian Republics, receiving his graduate education at Georgetown Law School, Harvard University and Panteion University (Athens) of Political Sciences. After graduating, Borgeas was a law clerk for Judge Oliver Wanger of the United States District Court for the Eastern District of California. Borgeas then practiced law at Luce Forward. For over a decade he has been a professor in the fields of international law and security affairs at the San Joaquin College of Law in Clovis, California and is an adjunct professor at the Middlebury Institute of International Studies at Monterey.

As an educator, he has worked in numerous international professional and academic capacities; including, as a Fulbright Scholar, Contributing Fellow for the Woodrow Wilson Center, Policy Specialist Fellow at the U.S. Embassy in Kazakhstan and was appointed by House Minority Leader Kevin McCarthy as commissioner on the United States-China Economic and Security Review Commission.

=== Local politics ===
In 2008, Borgeas started his political career by running successfully for the Fresno City Council. In 2012, Borgeas was elected to the Fresno County Board of Supervisors; he was re-elected in 2016.

=== California State Senate ===
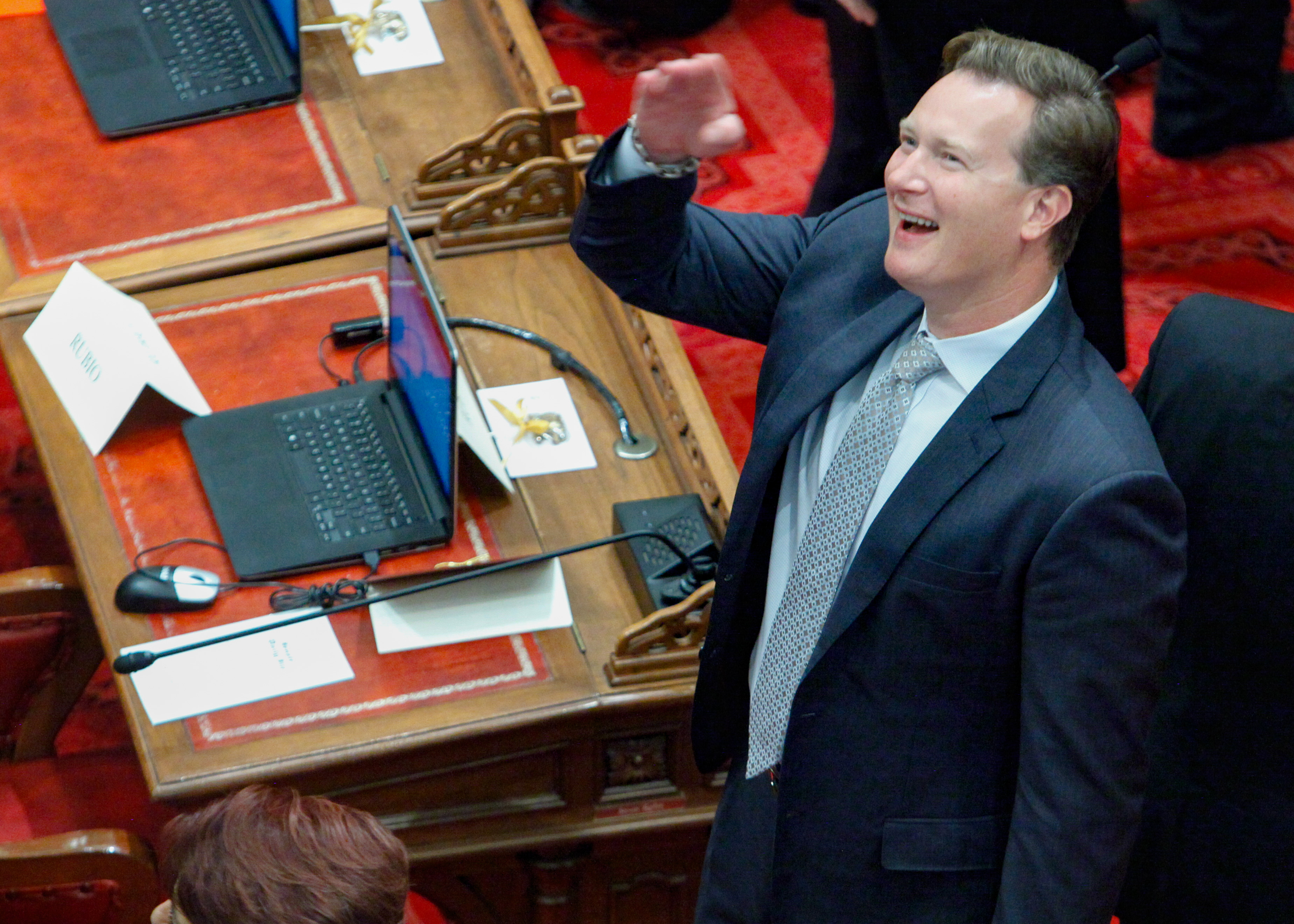
Andreas Borgeas on the Senate floor (2018)

In November 2018, Borgeas was elected as a Republican to the California State Senate, representing the 8th district. Borgeas defeated Democrat Paulina Miranda with 59.6% of the votes.

Borgeas serves as chair of the Senate Agriculture Committee and vice chair of the Senate Judiciary Committee.

On January 11, 2022, Borgeas announced he would not seek a second term in the state Senate.

==== White House visit ====
In October 2019, Borgeas was invited by President Donald Trump to witness the signing of two executive orders at the White House.

=== 2022 congressional special election ===
After incumbent Congressman Devin Nunes announced that he would resign from California's 8th congressional district to become CEO of the Trump Media & Technology Group, Borgeas formed an exploratory committee to consider a campaign for the seat.

On January 6, 2022, Borgeas announced that he was suspending his campaign for the United States House of Representatives.

== Political positions ==
=== Bipartisanship ===
Borgeas has been lauded for his bipartisan leadership when it comes to addressing regional issues on numerous occasions. The Fresno Bee has acknowledged Borgeas' objective and deft handling of the COVID-19 pandemic. Borgeas also successfully spearheaded, with his Democratic colleague, Anna Caballero, a bipartisan effort to deliver $2.6 billion to small businesses impacted by COVID-19.

Borgeas has been praised by The Modesto Bee, The Fresno Bee, and The Sacramento Bee for being one of the few Republicans to condemn the 2021 storming of the United States Capitol. The Sacramento Bee noted: "...state Sen. Andreas Borgeas, R-Fresno, who is apparently the only one of California’s nine Republican state senators willing to directly say the truth."

=== CEQA reform ===
Borgeas has been a staunch advocate for California Environmental Quality Act (CEQA) reform. In an op-ed Borgeas stated "...CEQA has morphed into a legal weapon for lawyers and activist groups to stall essential projects..." and narrowly passed Senate Bill 659 through the Senate Judiciary Committee.

=== Assembly Bill 5 ===
Borgeas has been an opponent of California Assembly Bill 5, passed by Assemblywoman Lorena Gonzalez in 2019. In a tweet, Borgeas claimed AB 5 "...limit[s] an individual's ability for flexible employment and destroys entire industries across California. Independent contractors and small businesses are the backbone of a thriving California economy." He organized a town hall at Clovis Community College to discuss the bill's impact on freelancers and independent contractors.

=== Water ===
Borgeas has advocated for state and federal support to improve the Friant-Kern Canal, which is critical for water delivery to the agricultural industry in the San Joaquin Valley. Senate Bill 559 introduced by state Senator Melissa Hurtado would have allocated $400 million in state funding to make necessary repairs to the canal as a result of subsidence from groundwater overdraft.

Borgeas has also vocalized support for the federal government's plan to increase water deliveries to California farmers. During then-President Donald Trump's visit to the San Joaquin Valley in February 2020, Borgeas stated,"The ball is now in Governor Newsom's court to provide clean, reliable and ample water supplies to Valley farmers and communities. The state must ensure that infrastructure and storage are a top priority. It's simple: no water, no farms, and no food."

=== Taxes and the economy ===
Borgeas has received high marks from the Howard Jarvis Taxpayers Association and the California Chamber of Commerce.

== Personal life ==
Borgeas and his wife, Anna, have two sons. Borgeas and his family live in Fresno, California. Borgeas has said growing up in Phoenix, Arizona helped shape his political views at an early age. Borgeas is known to be heavily involved in Fresno's Greek and Armenian communities. He is also known for his involvement with the Fresno Greek Fest and as an advocate for the recognition of the Armenian genocide.

== See also ==
- 2018 California State Senate election
