= Senator Rubio (disambiguation) =

Marco Rubio (born 1971) was a U.S. Senator from Florida between 2011 and 2025.

Senator Rubio may also refer to:

- Michael Rubio (born 1977), American politician in the California State Senate
- Susan Rubio (born 1970), American politician in the California State Senate
