= California's 8th district =

California's 8th district may refer to:

- California's 8th congressional district
- California's 8th State Assembly district
- California's 8th State Senate district
