= Andy Vidak =

American politician

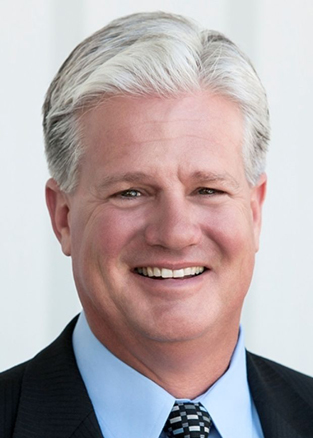

Member of the California State Senate
- In office August 10, 2013 – November 30, 2018
- Preceded by: Michael Rubio
- Succeeded by: Melissa Hurtado
- Constituency: 14th district (2014–2018); 16th district (2013–2014)

Personal details
- Born: November 13, 1965 (age 60) Visalia, California, U.S.
- Party: Republican
- Education: Texas Tech University
- Occupation: Cherry Farmer

James Andrew Vidak (born November 13, 1965) is an American politician. A Republican, he served in the California State Senate from 2013 to 2018 representing portions of the San Joaquin Valley. From 2013 to 2014, Vidak represented the 16th Senate District; he then won a full term in the 14th Senate District.

Vidak was first elected to the state Senate in a 2013 special election after the resignation of former state senator Michael Rubio, and was re-elected in 2014. He sought re-election in 2018, but was defeated by Democrat Melissa Hurtado.

== Early life and career ==
Vidak was born in Visalia, California to James Vidak, the Tulare County superintendent of schools, and Kathleen Vidak. The eldest of five children, he graduated from Redwood High School in 1984 and then attended College of the Sequoias in Visalia and California State University, Fresno before receiving his Bachelor of Science degree in Animal Business from Texas Tech University. He returned to the San Joaquin Valley to work in the produce industry before opening his own cherry farm outside Hanford in 1997.

== Politics ==
=== Campaigns ===
==== 2010 congressional race ====
In the 2010 midterm elections, Vidak announced his candidacy for Congress in California's 20th congressional district, challenging longtime incumbent Democrat Jim Costa. The race was too close to call on election night and was only settled three weeks after Election Day. Costa ultimately won re-election with 52% of the vote to Vidak's 48%, with a total popular vote margin of 3,050, in the closest race of Costa's Congressional career up to that point.

==== 2013 special election to the State Senate ====
Following the sudden resignation of incumbent Democrat Michael Rubio on February 22, 2013, the 16th State Senate seat was left vacant and a special election was called.

Vidak's main challenger in the election was Leticia Perez, a former criminal defense attorney and supervisor from Kern County's 5th district. In the May 21 primary election, Vidak appeared to win outright with over 52% of the vote, but enough late absentee and provisional ballots counted in the next few days favored Perez and pushed Vidak down to 50%, sending the race to a general election on July 23 between him and Perez. In the general election, Vidak defeated Perez with 52% of the vote compared to Perez's 48%. The popular vote margin between the two was 3,084, just barely higher than the same margin by which Vidak lost to Jim Costa three years earlier.

Vidak's win marked the first time since 1996 in which the winning state Senate candidate of a special election was not from the same party as the incumbent. It is also marked the first time that a Republican took a Democratic State Senate seat since 1993, and the 8th time overall (in regards to special elections). It was also the first time in 18 years that the 16th district has seen a Republican state senator, since Phil Wyman represented the district briefly during 1993–95. (Then assemblyman Costa beat Wyman in 1994 and served until being termed out in 2002. He was succeeded by Democratic assemblyman Dean Florez who served from 2002 to 2010).

==== 2014 re-election ====
Vidak ran for reelection, for his first full term, in November 2014. By the time of the primary, the 16th district was redrawn into the 14th district. His sole Democratic challenger was Luis Chavez from Fresno. In the June 3 primary, Vidak came in first with 61% of the vote ahead of Chavez. In the November 4 general election, Vidak defeated Chavez by a smaller margin of 54% to Chavez's 46%.

==== 2018 ====
Vidak announced his third run for the seat, for his second full term, in March 2018. He faced three Democratic challengers: Sanger city councilwoman Melissa Hurtado, Earlimart school board president Abigail Solis, and Ruben Macareno from Farmersville, who previously ran for California's 26th State Assembly district in 2016.

In the June 2018 primary, Vidak received 54.1% of the vote. Hurtado received the second-highest number of votes, allowing her to advance to the general election. However, in November 2018 general election, Hurtado defeated Vidak, taking 55.8% of the vote compared to his 44.2%. The margin was 16,811 votes.

=== Tenure as state senator ===
Vidak was sworn in on August 10, 2013.

On September 11, 2013, Vidak asked for the Senate to vote on whether or not the people of California should be allowed to re-vote on the High-Speed Rail project due to a sharp increase in prices and costs of the project. The effort failed due to 24 Democrats voting against it, while 11 Republicans voted in favor. Vidak has continued his efforts to delay, defund, or hold a re-vote on the project throughout his time in the Senate.

On October 16, 2013, Vidak joined fellow Senator Anthony Cannella of the 12th district in calling for an investigation into the California Employment Development Department after it ceased providing unemployment benefits to over 150,000 Californians and closed several offices in Turlock and Los Banos.

In response to Governor Jerry Brown's declaration of a state of drought for California, Vidak joined with Senator Cannella once again to pass legislation geared towards storage and protection of water throughout the state. On January 30, 2014, they announced the result as Senate Bill 927, which would put a water bond on the November 2014 ballot that would include efforts to store and protect clean water and clean already-contaminated water, at a cost of $9.2 billion. Vidak also wrote a letter to President Barack Obama asking for support, and was interviewed by Lou Dobbs on the Fox Business Network to further explain the crisis, its causes, and ways to solve it.

In June 2014, Vidak was one of five State Senators who was awarded a perfect score by the California Chamber of Commerce for voting against Senate bills that were identified as "job-killers."

In October 2014, Vidak was named the "Most Fascinating Person of 2014" by the Center for the Blind and Visually Impaired (CBVI) and the Advanced Center for Eyecare (ACE). He was also named "Legislator of the Year" by the California Small Business Association (CSBA) and the California Small Business Roundtable (CSBR).

In March 2016, Vidak introduced Senate Bill 976, which sought to extend the one-year ban on lobbying by ex-lawmakers to two years, and possibly up to four years, in an effort to curtail the revolving door effect. Later that same month, Vidak was credited with saving a woman's life by directing traffic away from a sycamore tree with a breaking branch about half a mile from the Capitol, after he could hear the sound of the wood cracking. Due to his intervention, driver Tracy Courtney stopped her car just as the branch broke, crushing the front end of the car but narrowly missing her. Vidak credited the incident to divine intervention, saying: "I walked that direction for a reason I guess. God put me on that path and in that direction and I heard it."

In July 2017, Vidak spoke out against AB 398, an extension of the state's efforts to combat climate change known as "cap-and-trade," which included such measures as tax hikes. In his speech on the floor of the State Senate, Vidak said "I represent the poorest district in the state. I cannot, in good conscience, vote for yet another bill that will raise gasoline and electricity rates on the poorest of the poor." His speech received praise from Breitbart, which called Vidak's speech the most "eloquent" of all the Republicans who spoke out against the bill. The bill ultimately passed through the legislature with the support of seven Republicans in the Assembly, including the Republican Assembly leader Chad Mayes, and one Republican state senator, Tom Berryhill.

In December 2017, Vidak drafted a resolution calling for the expulsion of Democratic state senator Tony Mendoza due to sexual harassment allegations. The State Senate eventually voted to suspend Mendoza for 60 days in January 2018, and he resigned in late February.

== Electoral history ==
2010 California's 20th congressional district election
Primary election
Party	Candidate	Votes	%
Republican	Andy Vidak	13,770	70.3
Republican	Richard Lake	4,347	22.2
Republican	Serafin Quintanar	1,471	7.5
Total votes		19,588	100.0
General election
Democratic	Jim Costa (incumbent)	46,247	51.8
Republican	Andy Vidak	43,197	48.2
Total votes		89,444	100.0
Democratic hold			

2013 California State Senate 16th district special election Vacancy resulting from the resignation of Michael Rubio
Primary election
Party	Candidate	Votes	%
Republican	Andy Vidak	31,610	49.8
Democratic	Leticia Perez	27,854	43.9
Democratic	Francisco Ramírez	1,890	3.0
Democratic	Paulina Miranda	1,623	2.6
Peace and Freedom	Mohammed "O" Arif	471	0.7
Total votes		63,448	100.0
General election
Republican	Andy Vidak	42,224	51.9
Democratic	Leticia Perez	39,140	48.1
Total votes		81,364	100.0
Republican gain from Democratic			

2014 California State Senate 14th district election
Primary election
Party	Candidate	Votes	%
Republican	Andy Vidak (incumbent)	35,953	61.2
Democratic	Luis Chavez	22,771	38.8
Total votes		58,724	100.0
General election
Republican	Andy Vidak (incumbent)	54,251	54.1
Democratic	Luis Chavez	46,035	45.9
Total votes		100,286	100.0
Republican hold			
