= California's 16th senatorial district =

American legislative district

California's 16th State Senate district
Current senator
Melissa Hurtado; D–Bakersfield
- Population (2010) • Voting age • Citizen voting age: 922,123; 662,419; 564,836
- Demographics: 52.04% White; 5.13% Black; 35.72% Latino; 4.41% Asian; 1.73% Native American; 0.29% Hawaiian/Pacific Islander; 0.23% other; 0.45% remainder of multiracial
- Registered voters: 481,235
- Registration: 41.40% Republican; 28.99% Democratic; 22.46% No party preference

California's 16th senatorial district is one of 40 California State Senate districts. It is currently represented by Democrat Melissa Hurtado of Bakersfield.

== District profile ==
The district consists of portions of southwestern Central Valley, including Kings County, western Tulare County, and northwestern Kern County.

== Election results from statewide races ==
Year	Office	Results
2021	Recall	Yes 63.7 – 36.3%
2020	President	Trump 57.9 – 39.6%
2018	Governor	Cox 63.0 – 37.0%
2018	Senator	de Leon 60.5 – 39.5%
2016	President	Trump 59.0 – 35.2%
2016	Senator	Harris 54.3 – 45.7%
2014	Governor	Kashkari 64.9 – 35.1%
2012	President	Romney 61.7 – 35.9%
2012	Senator	Emken 62.1 – 37.9%

== List of senators representing the district ==
Due to redistricting, the 16th district has been moved around different parts of the state. The current iteration resulted from the 2021 redistricting by the California Citizens Redistricting Commission.

Senators	Party	Years served	Counties represented	Notes
Franklin Thomas Baldwin	Democratic	January 8, 1883 – January 3, 1887	Amador, San Joaquin	Baldwin and Langford served together.
Benjamin Franklin Langford	Democratic	January 8, 1883 – January 3, 1887	Amador, San Joaquin	Baldwin and Langford served together.
Frank James Moffitt	Democratic	January 3, 1887 – January 5, 1891	Alameda	
Eli Sherman Denison	Republican	January 5, 1891 – January 2, 1893	Alameda	
George G. Goucher	Democratic	January 2, 1893 – January 7, 1895	Fresno	
Alfred Joel Pedlar	Republican	January 7, 1895 – January 2, 1899	Fresno, Madera	
Chester Rowell	Republican	January 2, 1899 – January 5, 1903	Fresno, Madera	
Frank W. Leavitt	Republican	January 5, 1903 – January 2, 1911	Alameda	
Edward J. Tyrrell	Republican	January 2, 1911 – January 6, 1919	Alameda	Ran as a Progressive for his 2nd term.
Edward J. Tyrrell	Progressive	January 2, 1911 – January 6, 1919	Alameda	Ran as a Progressive for his 2nd term.
A. P. Anderson	Republican	January 6, 1919 – January 8, 1923	Alameda	
Edgar Sanders Hurley	Republican	January 8, 1923 – January 5, 1931	Alameda	
Arthur Hastings Breed, Sr.	Republican	January 5, 1931 – January 7, 1935	Alameda	
William Knowland	Republican	January 7, 1935 – January 2, 1939	Alameda	
Arthur H. Breed Jr.	Republican	January 2, 1939 – January 5, 1959	Alameda	
John W. Holmdahl	Democratic	January 5, 1959 – January 2, 1967	Alameda	
Hugh Morrison Burns	Democratic	January 2, 1967 – January 4, 1971	Fresno	
George N. Zenovich	Democratic	January 4, 1971 – November 30, 1974	Fresno	
Walter W. Stiern	Democratic	December 2, 1974 – November 30, 1986	Inyo, Kern, Los Angeles, San Bernardino	
Walter W. Stiern	Democratic	December 2, 1974 – November 30, 1986	Kern, Kings, Los Angeles, San Bernardino	
Don Rogers	Republican	December 1, 1986 – December 15, 1992	Kern, Kings, Los Angeles, San Bernardino	Resigned his seat from the 16th State Senate district to assume another seat in the 17th Senate district due to redistricting.
Vacant		December 15, 1992 – May 3, 1993	Kern, Kings, Los Angeles, San Bernardino	
Phil Wyman	Republican	May 3, 1993 – November 30, 1994	Kern, Kings, Los Angeles, San Bernardino	Sworn in after winning special election.
Jim Costa	Democratic	December 5, 1994 – November 30, 2002	Fresno, Kern, Kings, Madera, Tulare	
Dean Florez	Democratic	December 2, 2002 – November 30, 2010	Fresno, Kern, Kings, Tulare	
Michael Rubio	Democratic	December 6, 2010 – February 22, 2013	Fresno, Kern, Kings, Tulare	Resigned from the State Senate.
Vacant		February 22, 2013 – August 10, 2013	Fresno, Kern, Kings, Tulare	
Andy Vidak	Republican	August 10, 2013 – November 30, 2014	Fresno, Kern, Kings, Tulare	Sworn in after winning special election.
Jean Fuller	Republican	December 1, 2014 – November 30, 2018	Kern, San Bernardino, Tulare	
Shannon Grove	Republican	December 3, 2018 – November 30, 2022	Kern, San Bernardino, Tulare	Redistricted to the 12th district
Melissa Hurtado	Democratic	December 5, 2022 – present	Fresno, Kern, Kings, Tulare	

== Election results (1990-present) ==
=== 2022 ===
2022 California State Senate 16th district election
Primary election
Party	Candidate	Votes	%
Republican	David Shepard	32,579	43.4
Democratic	Melissa Hurtado (incumbent)	22,162	29.6
Democratic	Nicole Parra	9,921	13.2
Republican	Gregory Tatum	6,016	8.0
Democratic	Bryan Osorio	4,344	5.8
Total votes		75,022	100.0
General election
Democratic	Melissa Hurtado (incumbent)	68,460	50.008
Republican	David Shepard	68,438	49.992
Total votes		136,898	100.0
Democratic gain from Republican			

=== 2018 ===
2018 California State Senate 16th district election
Primary election
Party	Candidate	Votes	%
Republican	Shannon Grove	90,353	59.1
Democratic	Ruth Musser-Lopez	44,303	29.0
Republican	Gregory Tatum	18,152	11.9
Total votes		152,808	100.0
General election
Republican	Shannon Grove	169,714	64.2
Democratic	Ruth Musser-Lopez	94,579	35.8
Total votes		264,293	100.0
Republican hold			

=== 2014 ===
2014 California State Senate 16th district election
Primary election
Party	Candidate	Votes	%
Republican	Jean Fuller (incumbent)	79,843	99.8
Democratic	Ruth Musser-Lopez (write-in)	189	0.2
Total votes		80,032	100.0
General election
Republican	Jean Fuller (incumbent)	122,700	72.8
Democratic	Ruth Musser-Lopez	45,812	27.2
Total votes		168,512	100.0
Republican hold			

=== 2013 (special) ===
2013 California State Senate 16th district special election Vacancy resulting from the resignation of Michael Rubio
Primary election
Party	Candidate	Votes	%
Republican	Andy Vidak	31,610	49.8
Democratic	Leticia Perez	27,854	43.9
Democratic	Francisco "Frank" Ramirez	1,890	3.0
Democratic	Paulina Miranda	1,623	2.6
Peace and Freedom	Muhammad "O" Arif	471	0.7
Total votes		63,448	100.0
General election
Republican	Andy Vidak	42,224	51.9
Democratic	Leticia Perez	39,140	48.1
Total votes		81,364	100.0
Republican gain from Democratic			

=== 2010 ===
2010 California State Senate 16th district election
Party	Candidate	Votes	%
Democratic	Michael Rubio	71,334	60.5
Republican	Tim Thiesen	46,717	39.5
Total votes		118,051	100.0
Democratic hold			

=== 2006 ===
2006 California State Senate 16th district election
Party	Candidate	Votes	%
Democratic	Dean Florez (incumbent)	78,146	100.0
Total votes		78,146	100.0
Democratic hold			

=== 2002 ===
2002 California State Senate 16th district election
Party	Candidate	Votes	%
Democratic	Dean Florez	69,503	70.0
Republican	Blair Knox	29,747	30.0
Total votes		99,250	100.0
Democratic hold			

=== 1998 ===
1998 California State Senate 16th district election
Party	Candidate	Votes	%
Democratic	Jim Costa (incumbent)	92,163	71.9
Republican	Gregg Palmer	36,005	28.1
Total votes		128,168	100.0
Democratic hold			

=== 1994 ===
1994 California State Senate 16th district election
Party	Candidate	Votes	%
Democratic	Jim Costa	70,329	51.6
Republican	Phil Wyman (incumbent)	66,053	48.4
Total votes		136,382	100.0
Democratic gain from Republican			

=== 1993 (special) ===
1993 California State Senate 16th district special election Vacancy resulting from the resignation of Don Rogers
Primary election
Party	Candidate	Votes	%
Democratic	Jim Costa	29,350	38.0
Republican	Phil Wyman	28,214	36.5
Republican	Kevin McDermott	11,442	14.8
Democratic	Irma Carson	3,217	4.2
Republican	Leonard C. Tekaat	1,160	1.5
Republican	Michael McCloskey	1,041	1.3
Democratic	Daniel Beller	978	1.3
Democratic	Dennis J. Wilson	763	1.0
Republican	Donald G. Heath	539	0.7
Democratic	Jay Hanson	364	0.5
Republican	Chris S. Binning	225	0.3
Total votes		77,293	100.0
General election
Republican	Phil Wyman	48,768	52.7
Democratic	Jim Costa	43,807	47.3
Independent	Leonard C. Tekaat (write-in)	5	0.0
Total votes		92,580	100.0
Republican hold			

=== 1990 ===
1990 California State Senate 16th district election
Party	Candidate	Votes	%
Republican	Don Rogers (incumbent)	82,885	52.0
Democratic	Ray Gonzales	72,796	44.1
Libertarian	Kenneth J. Saurenman	6,554	4.0
Total votes		162,235	100.0
Republican hold			

== See also ==
- California State Senate
- California State Senate districts
- Districts in California
