= T. C. West =

Canadian-American politician

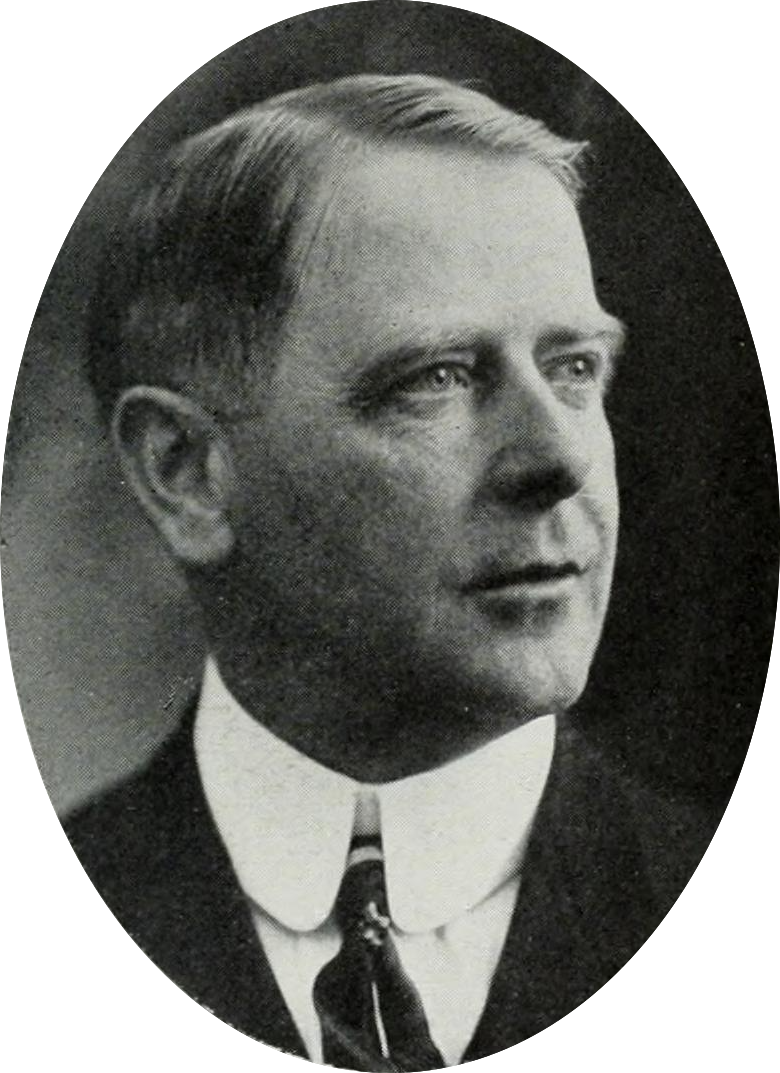

Member of the California Senate from the 14th district
- In office January 8, 1923 – January 5, 1931
- Preceded by: Edwin Mastic Otis
- Succeeded by: Roy Fellom

Personal details
- Born: April 28, 1868 Orangeville, Ontario, Canada
- Died: January 1, 1936 (aged 67) Alameda, California, US
- Party: Republican
- Spouse: Maud Stanley Mishaw (m. 1906)
- Education: Trinity College, Dublin (BA, 1887)

Military service
- Branch/service: United States Army
- Battles/wars: Spanish–American War

Thomas Christopher West (April 28, 1868 – January 1, 1936) was an American politician and lawyer. In the 1920s, West represented District 14, then centered in Alameda, in the California State Senate. Before his career in politics, he was an attorney in private practice in San Francisco.

== Early life ==
West was born in Orangeville, Ontario, Canada, and practiced law in Toronto in a government position before moving to California in 1899. He also practiced in Calgary.

After moving to the US, West served in the Army as a legal officer for the Quartermaster General in the Philippines during the Spanish–American War.

As of 1905, he was corresponding secretary for the British and American Union in San Francisco.

He married Maud Stanley Mishaw, from Austin, Texas on April 4, 1906.

== Legal career ==
West was a lawyer in San Francisco in the early 20th century.

In 1903, he helped to represent a woman who claimed to be the widow of a then-recently deceased man from Toronto named Eli Hyman, in order to assist her in obtaining Hyman's fortune.

In 1904, he was involved in attachment litigation with respect to the assets of Wah Chung Lung, Tee Mee Toy, and Dick Williams, a group of merchants in San Francisco.

In 1918, he appeared before the United States Court of Appeals for the Ninth Circuit, representing the Illinois Surety Company.

In 1923, he sought an injunction against the Industrial Welfare Commission on behalf of Helen Gainer, because an order of the Commission prevented her from being employed in a candy factory for $6 (now around $113) a week. The Commission's minimum rate for such work was $9 (now roughly $170) per week.

== California State Senate ==
The California State Senate met on a biennial basis in the early 20th century. West represented the 14th senate district, then centered in Alameda, in 1923, 1925, 1927, and 1929.

West was a member of the Republican Party.

In 1925, West sponsored a bill that would have allowed the state legislature to amend laws passed under California's initiative and referendum process. It failed to pass. That year, Billboard also commended West as an advocate for the entertainment industry in the State Senate.

In 1929, West sponsored a bill to implement daylight saving time in California. It was voted down in committee.

After leaving the Senate he was a member of the Alameda Board of Education and assistant city attorney of Alameda, where he died on January 1, 1936.
