= Virgil O'Sullivan =

American politician

Member of the California Senate from the 8th district
- In office January 5, 1959 - January 2, 1967
- Preceded by: Louis G. Sutton
- Succeeded by: Lewis F. Sherman

Personal details
- Born: May 7, 1918 Colusa, California, U.S.
- Died: December 27, 2010 (aged 92) Colusa, California, U.S.
- Party: Democratic
- Spouse: June O'Sullivan (m. 1950)
- Children: 8

Military service
- Branch/service: United States Army
- Battles/wars: World War II

Virgil O'Sullivan (May 7, 1918 – December 27, 2010) served in the California State Senate for the 8th district from 1959 to 1967 and during World War II he served in the United States Army.
