= Shannon Grove =

American politician from California

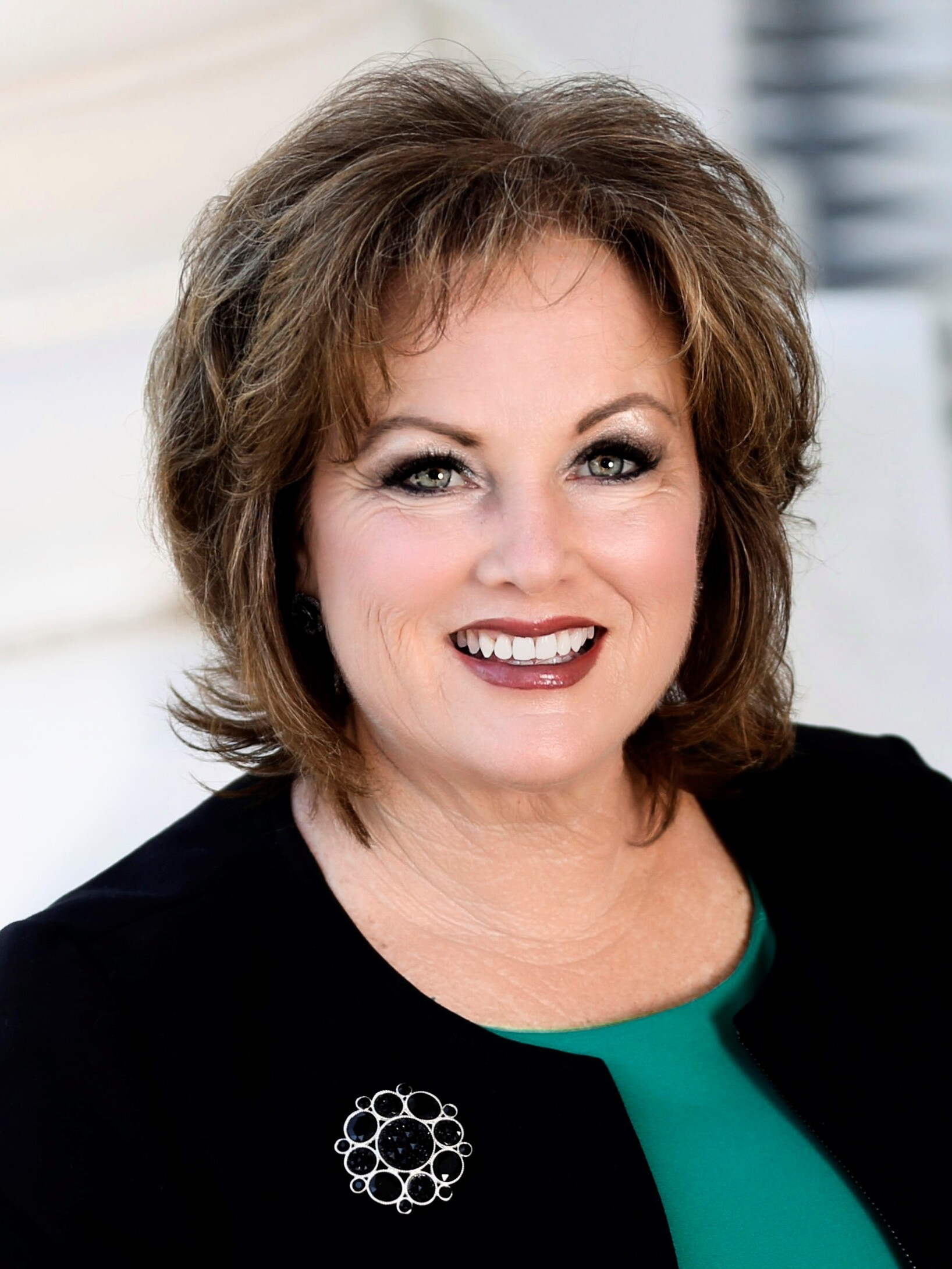
- Official portrait, 2019

Minority Leader of the California State Senate
- In office March 1, 2019 – January 20, 2021
- Preceded by: Patricia Bates
- Succeeded by: Scott Wilk

Member of the California State Senate
- Incumbent
- Assumed office December 3, 2018
- Preceded by: Jean Fuller
- Constituency: 16th district (2018–2022); 12th district (2022–present)

Member of the California State Assembly
- In office December 6, 2010 – November 30, 2016
- Preceded by: Jean Fuller
- Succeeded by: Vince Fong
- Constituency: 32nd district (2010–2012); 34th district (2012–2016)

Personal details
- Born: Shannon Lee Cain; March 18, 1965 (age 61) Bakersfield, California, U.S.
- Party: Republican
- Spouse: Rick Grove (m. 2007)
- Children: 5

Military service
- Allegiance: United States
- Branch/service: United States Army
- Unit: 5th Corps, Headquarters Company

Shannon Lee Grove (née Cain; born March 18, 1965) is an American politician, who represents California's 12th State Senatorial district, encompassing the southern Central Valley and parts of the High Desert. A Republican, she served as the minority leader of the California State Senate from 2019 to 2021.

Grove previously served in the California State Assembly, representing the 34th State Assembly district, which encompassed most of Kern County. She is the chief executive officer of an employment agency she started in 1993 with her sister-in-law.

== Early life and career ==
Grove was born in Kern County, California, and grew up there. She graduated from the Kern High School District. Attended Nueva Continuation High School in Lamont, California, and graduated Arvin High School in Arvin, California before spending three years in the U.S. Army, serving with Headquarters Company, 5th Corps, in Frankfurt, Germany, where she performed administrative tasks.

Upon returning to her native Kern County, California, Grove worked for two temporary staffing agencies: TempServ for one year and then Workforce Staffing for another year. In 1993, Grove established her own temporary staffing company, Continental Labor & Staffing Resources, with her sister-in-law; the company subsequently expanded to Bakersfield, Ridgecrest, Paso Robles and Visalia; the last two of which are now closed. Grove is the CEO.

== Legislative career ==
=== Elections and committees ===
Grove was elected in the Tea Party wave of 2010, succeeding Jean Fuller, who was termed out and ran successfully for the State Senate. She was re-elected twice to the California State Assembly, and was sworn into her third term in 2014. Due to term limits, Grove was not eligible to run for a fourth term in 2016. In the Assembly, Grove was vice chair (i.e., ranking Republican member) of the Elections and Redistricting Committee, and also sat on the Agriculture, Insurance, and Budget committees.

When Fuller could not run for the State Senate in 2018 due to term limits, Grove ran for the open seat. The Republican-leaning district is the largest in California in terms of land area, comprising Tulare County, Kern County, and part of San Bernardino County. This is the southeastern San Joaquin Valley and much of Mojave Desert, including Ridgecrest, Taft, Tehachapi, Barstow, Tulare, Visalia, and four-fifths of Bakersfield. She was favored in the race against Republican Gregory Tatum, a church pastor, and Democrat Ruth Musser-Lopez, an archaeologist and former Needles council member, and easily won the election.

In January 2019, Grove was elected by her Senate Republican colleagues to serve as their leader. In this role, Grove led the 11-member Republican caucus in the California State Senate, where the Democrats enjoy a supermajority. Republican dissatisfaction with Grove's leadership increased after the caucus lost two seats in the November 2020 election, leaving them with just 9 members, even as Republicans made gains in the concurrent elections for the U.S. House of Representatives and the California State Assembly. After the 2021 United States Capitol attack, Grove incorrectly blamed the attack on antifa; this triggered a caucus revolt that ousted her as leader in favor of the somewhat more moderate Scott Wilk. According to Politico, a number of Republican state senators had long felt chagrin with Grove's unabashed support of Trump, which they felt had become "a significant liability."

=== Record and political views ===
==== Donald Trump ====
Grove is a conservative and outspoken Donald Trump supporter. After Trump lost the 2020 presidential election, Grove promoted and supported Trump's false claims of voter fraud. Following the storming of the United States Capitol by Trump supporters in January 2021, Grove was among those who advanced the conspiracy theory that people associated with antifa were responsible for the attack.

==== Public health ====
Grove opposes mandatory vaccination of schoolchildren.

In September 2020, during the COVID-19 pandemic in California, Grove addressed a large prayer gathering in front of the California State Capitol, where few of the thousands present wore masks or socially distanced. Grove appeared on the stage and addressed the meeting without wearing a mask and while under a state-ordered quarantine. She was one of nine Republican state senators who had been in close contact with state Senator Brian Jones, who had tested positive for COVID-19.

==== Education ====
Grove introduced a bill in 2015 that would mandate that California public colleges and universities allow student organizations to maintain belief-based requirements for its members and leaders. The bill targeted the California State University system's "open membership" or "all-comers" policy, which bars student organizations from imposing belief-based criteria for membership and leadership.

==== Social issues ====
Grove has introduced anti-abortion legislation into the Assembly, which did not pass. Grove opposed legislation passed by the Assembly in 2015 in response to misinformation at crisis pregnancy centers (CPCs). The law required CPC to disclose whether they were licensed, and required the posting of notices stating that "reproductive health services, including abortion, are available to pregnant women and may be financed under government programs." Grove argued that the legislation is unconstitutional.

In June 2016, Grove attracted attention and criticism after linking abortion legislation and the wrath of God to the drought in California. While speaking to a group of anti-abortion activists at an event in Sacramento, Grove brought a copy of the Bible to the platform and stated that: "Texas was in a long period of drought until Gov. [Rick] Perry signed the fetal pain bill. It rained that night." Grove's remarks sparked a backlash and were criticized as "patently ridiculous" by NARAL Pro-Choice California, an abortion rights group. Grove responded to criticism by saying that she had been misconstrued. In a Facebook post following the speech, Grove wrote: "Is this drought caused by God? Nobody knows. But biblical history shows a consequence to man"s actions; we do know for sure that California’s water shortage crisis has been compounded by liberal politicians' poor decisions — not properly managing our water resources and refusing to build water storage for decades."

Grove opposed the aid-in-dying legislation (S.B. 128) passed by the California State Legislature, saying: "Suicide should never be used as a legitimate way to end human suffering. Although promoted as a compassionate option for the terminally ill, this bill will have a corrupting influence on public and private healthcare providers looking for ways to reduce the cost of end of life care." In Assembly floor debate on the legislation in 2015, Grove stated: "Sorry, colleagues, pain is part of life."

==== Energy, environment, and infrastructure ====
In 2016, Grove produced a widely viewed video, posted on Facebook, that blamed Californian farmers' lack of water on policies under the Endangered Species Act, which protects the endangered delta smelt. Grove states in the video: "Our children are going to lose this blessing if water policy in California does not change. California's bread basket, which feeds this nation and the world, will be destroyed."

Grove is a staunch critic of California's high-speed passenger rail (bullet train) project, and has accused the California High-Speed Rail Authority of obscuring cost overruns. Grove has called the project a "train to nowhere" and believes that it is too costly and disruptive to farmland.

Grove has called for reducing regulation of the fossil fuel industry. She has opposed efforts to combat climate change, calling such measures unaffordable. In 2012, Grove invited Lord Monckton, a well-known climate change denier, to speak to the Legislature, although only five of 120 state lawmakers attended the talk. Grove opposes regulation of hydraulic fracturing (fracking), arguing that the technology is safe and that environmental critics of the practice are wrong. Along with several other legislative Republicans, Grove has sponsored legislation to exempt gasoline, diesel, and natural gas from California's cap-and-trade program. In 2021, after state regulators denied several permits for new fracking permits in Kern County, Grove urged the county board of supervisors to block solar energy projects in the county.

==== Economic and labor policy ====
Grove opposes prevailing wage legislation for workers on public-works projects, and has introduced legislation to roll-back prevailing-wage requirements; this legislation was defeated in committee on a party-line vote. In February 2016, Grove introduced two pieces of legislation (A.B. 2753 and A.B. 2754) to require California public-employee unions (such as SEIU Local 1000) to post itemized budgets online and to hold ratification elections every two years.

Grove sponsored legislation to amend California's Private Attorneys General Act (PAGA) of 2004, which allows workers to sue (as private attorneys general) employers who fail to properly pay workers or commit other labor law violations, arguing that PAGA suits had grown out of control,

Grove has sought to reduce the state's minimum business tax.

==== Social services ====
Grove has opposed providing financial assistance to poor families struggling to afford diapers for infant children.

Grove has advocated for the closure of two state developmental centers, which care for Californians with developmental disabilities. Grove became interested in the issue after learning about "abuse, neglect and lack of supervision" leading to 13 deaths at the centers, reported in an investigation by California Watch in 2013. Grove has introduced legislation to close the centers and shifting the developmentally disabled residents to nonprofit community-based care, which Grove argues will be cheaper and have stronger oversight than institutional settings. Grove's legislation was opposed by family members of center residents (who say that forcing their loved ones to move would be disruptive), and by center employees (who note that state-run centers are more expensive because they offer more comprehensive services than community-based nonprofits, and that the rate of abuse in community settings is unclear because of looser reporting requirements for abuse in such settings). Grove supports increased funding for developmental disability services, saying: "Now we're in a critical crisis stage where programs are closing."

==== Other ====
In 2011, as a first-term assemblywoman, Grove advocated changing the California State Legislature from a full-time to a part-time body. She sought to place an initiative on the California ballot to reduce its annual legislative session from nine months to three months (90 days) and cut lawmakers' annual salaries from $95,000 to $18,000. Grove pitched the idea in a four-minute video produced by a Tea Party group in 2012. A Field Poll showed that 39 percent of voters supported Grove's idea, while 45 percent opposed it.

== Electoral history ==
2010 California State Assembly 32nd district election
Primary election
Party	Candidate	Votes	%
Republican	Shannon Grove	36,513	69.1
Republican	Ken Mettler	14,007	26.5
Republican	Shannon Holloway	2,375	4.4
Total votes		52,895	100.0
General election
Republican	Shannon Grove	97,470	72.1
Democratic	Holly Spohn-Gross	37,892	27.9
Total votes		135,362	100.0
Republican hold			

2012 California State Assembly 34th district election
Primary election
Party	Candidate	Votes	%
Republican	Shannon Grove (incumbent)	54,345	73.7
Democratic	Virginia "Mari" Goodman	19,369	26.3
Total votes		73,714	100.0
General election
Republican	Shannon Grove (incumbent)	106,384	69.2
Democratic	Virginia "Mari" Goodman	47,254	30.8
Total votes		153,638	100.0
Republican hold			

2014 California State Assembly 34th district election
Primary election
Party	Candidate	Votes	%
Republican	Shannon Grove (incumbent)	37,749	74.6
Democratic	Virginia "Mari" Goodman	12,856	25.4
Total votes		50,605	100.0
General election
Republican	Shannon Grove (incumbent)	70,403	74.3
Democratic	Virginia "Mari" Goodman	24,132	25.5
Total votes		94,535	100.0
Republican hold			

2018 California State Senate 16th district election
Primary election
Party	Candidate	Votes	%
Republican	Shannon Grove	90,353	59.1
Democratic	Ruth Musser-Lopez	44,303	29.0
Republican	Gregory Tatum	18,152	11.9
Total votes		152,808	100.0
General election
Republican	Shannon Grove	169,714	64.2
Democratic	Ruth Musser-Lopez	94,579	35.8
Total votes		264,293	100.0
Republican hold			

2022 California State Senate 12th district election
Primary election
Party	Candidate	Votes	%
Republican	Shannon Grove (incumbent)	119,319	68.7
Democratic	Susanne Gundy	54,289	31.3
Total votes		173,608	100.0
General election
Republican	Shannon Grove (incumbent)	196,017	68.7
Democratic	Susanne Gundy	89,471	31.3
Total votes		285,488	100.0
Republican hold			

== Personal life ==
Grove lives in Bakersfield with her husband, Rick; they have five grown children. Grove is a member of an Assemblies of God congregation; she once called herself a "gun-carrying, tongue-talking, spirit-filled believer."

California Senate
Preceded by Patricia Bates	Minority Leader of the California Senate; 2019–2021	Succeeded by Scott Wilk
