= Lewis F. Sherman =

American politician

Member of the California Senate from the 8th district
- In office January 2, 1967 – January 4, 1971
- Preceded by: Virgil O'Sullivan
- Succeeded by: John W. Holmdahl

Personal details
- Born: February 10, 1917 Glasgow, Montana, U.S.
- Died: November 22, 1974 (aged 57) Alameda, California, U.S.
- Party: Republican
- Spouse: Mary Maxwell
- Children: 2

Military service
- Branch/service: United States Army
- Battles/wars: World War II

Lewis F. Sherman (February 10, 1917 – November 22, 1974) was a member of the California State Senate for the 8th district (1967 to 1971), helping to keep B.A.R.T. financed. During World War II, he served in the United States Army flying 90 missions over Europe. After his term as state senator, he was assigned as a municipal judge and a Superior Court judge by Governor Reagan.
