= John W. Holmdahl =

American politician

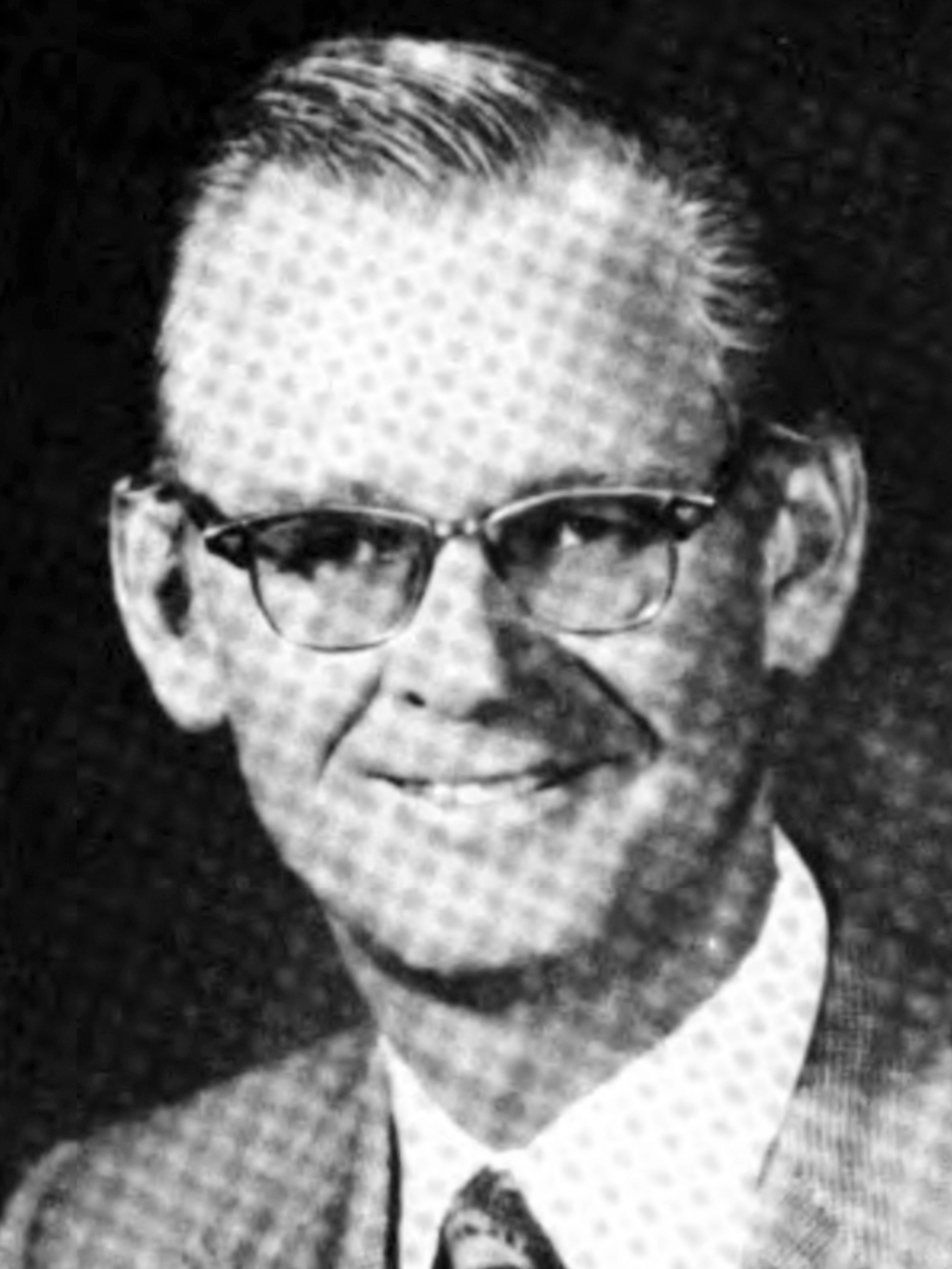

Member of the California Senate from the 8th district
- In office January 4, 1971 – October 15, 1982
- Preceded by: Lewis F. Sherman
- Succeeded by: John Francis Foran

Member of the California Senate from the 16th district
- In office January 5, 1959 – January 2, 1967
- Preceded by: Arthur H. Breed Jr.
- Succeeded by: Hugh M. Burns

Personal details
- Born: April 18, 1924 San Francisco, California, U.S.
- Died: July 17, 2017 (aged 93) Sacramento, California, U.S.
- Party: Democratic
- Spouse(s): Thea; Beverly Jane
- Children: 6

Military service
- Branch/service: United States Army
- Battles/wars: World War II

John William Holmdahl (April 18, 1924 – July 17, 2017) was a United States Democratic politician and a member of the California State Senate for the 16th district from 1959 to 1967 and the 8th district from 1971 to 1982. He was the first Democrat to represent Alameda County in the state Senate since 1890.

Holmdahl was born in San Francisco and during World War II he served in the United States Army. In 1955 he became a member of the Oakland City Council, remaining on that body until his election to the state Senate in 1958. After leaving the Senate, he was a judge of the California Court of Appeal from 1982 until his retirement in 1990.
