= Melissa Hurtado =

American politician (born 1988)

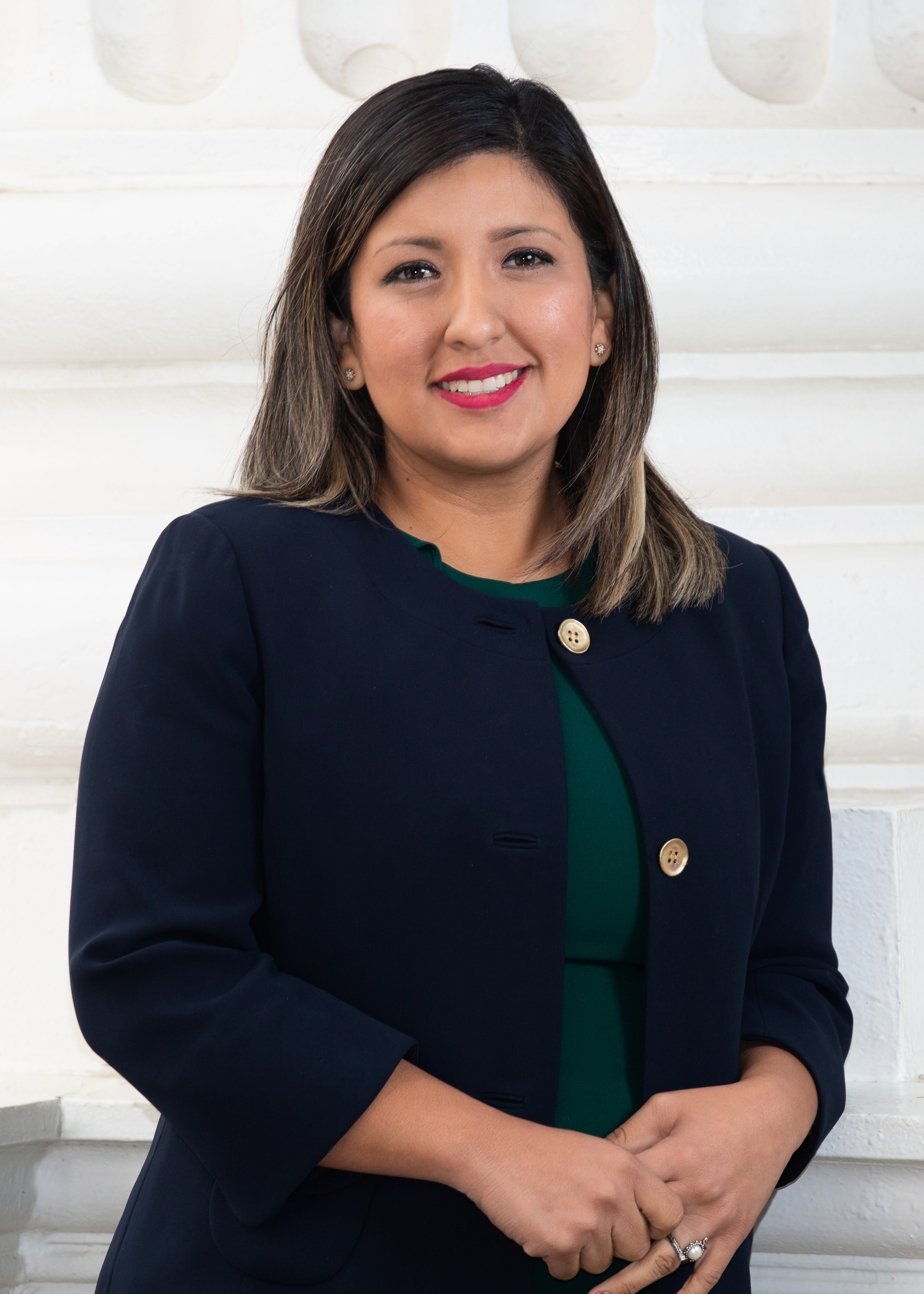
- Official portrait, 2018

Member of the California Senate from the 16th district
- Incumbent
- Assumed office December 3, 2018
- Preceded by: Andy Vidak
- Constituency: 14th district (2018–2022); 16th district (2022–present)

Member of the Sanger City Council for District 1
- In office 2016–2018

Personal details
- Born: March 6, 1988 (age 38) Fresno, California, U.S.
- Party: Democratic
- Education: CSU Sacramento(BA)
- Website: Campaign website

Melissa Hurtado (born March 6, 1988) is an American Democratic politician currently representing the 16th Senate District in the California State Senate, encompassing Bakersfield, Kings County, and parts of Tulare County. Prior to being elected to the State Senate, she served on the Sanger City Council.

Hurtado was first elected to the State Senate in November 2018, defeating incumbent Republican Andy Vidak.

On July 7 2020, Hurtado was selected to serve on the National Latino Leadership Committee of then-presidential-candidate Joe Biden. In 2022, Hurtado ran for re-election in the redrawn 16th district, winning with 50.01% percent by a margin of 22 votes. Prior to the election, she had been considered the most endangered incumbent of any district at the state level in the state of California.

In July 2023, Hurtado filed paperwork declaring candidacy for California's 22nd congressional district in the 2024 election. She placed fourth in the March 2024 primary election and did not advance to November's general election.

== Electoral history ==
2016 Sanger City Council 1st district election
Party	Candidate	Votes	%
Nonpartisan	Melissa Hurtado	815	68.2
Nonpartisan	Martin F. Castellano	370	31.0
Write-in		10	0.8
Total votes		1,195	100.0

2018 California State Senate 14th district election
Primary election
Party	Candidate	Votes	%
Republican	Andy Vidak (incumbent)	37,918	54.1
Democratic	Melissa Hurtado	16,295	23.2
Democratic	Abigail Solis	10,413	14.9
Democratic	Ruben Macareno	5,464	7.8
Total votes		70,090	100.0
General election
Democratic	Melissa Hurtado	80,942	55.8
Republican	Andy Vidak (incumbent)	64,131	44.2
Total votes		145,073	100.0
Democratic gain from Republican			

2022 California State Senate 16th district election
Primary election
Party	Candidate	Votes	%
Republican	David Shepard	32,579	43.4
Democratic	Melissa Hurtado (incumbent)	22,162	29.5
Democratic	Nicole Parra	9,921	13.2
Republican	Gregory Tatum	6,016	8.0
Democratic	Bryan Osorio	4,344	5.8
Total votes		75,022	100.0
General election
Democratic	Melissa Hurtado (incumbent)	68,460	50.01
Republican	David Shepard	68,438	49.99
Total votes		136,898	100.00
Democratic hold			

2024 California's 22nd congressional district primary
Party	Candidate	Votes	%
Republican	David Valadao (incumbent)	20,479	32.7
Democratic	Rudy Salas	19,592	31.3
Republican	Chris Mathys	13,745	22.0
Democratic	Melissa Hurtado	8,733	14.0
Total votes		62,549	100.0
