= George G. Goucher =

American politician

George G. Goucher (February 12, 1855 – January 20, 1911) was an American politician. He was a lawyer. He served in the California State Assembly and the California State Senate.
