= Jean Fuller =

American politician from California

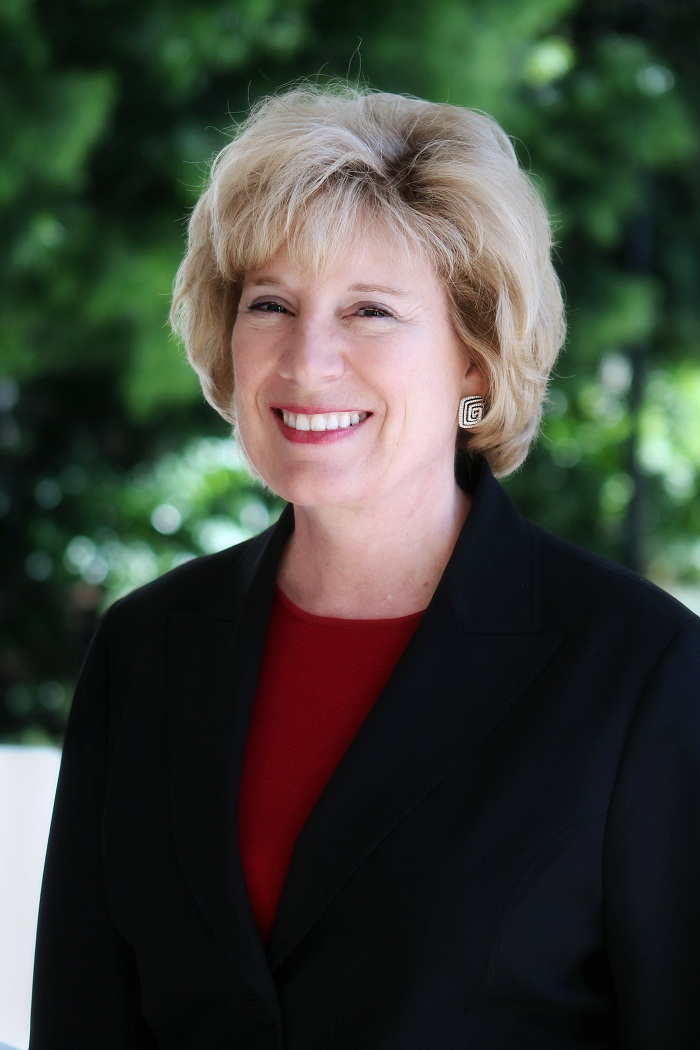

Minority Leader of the California Senate
- In office August 27, 2015 – April 12, 2017
- Preceded by: Bob Huff
- Succeeded by: Patricia Bates

Member of the California State Senate from the 16th district 18th district (2010–2014)
- In office December 6, 2010 – November 30, 2018
- Preceded by: Roy Ashburn
- Succeeded by: Shannon Grove

Member of the California State Assembly from the 32nd district
- In office December 4, 2006 – December 6, 2010
- Preceded by: Kevin McCarthy
- Succeeded by: Shannon Grove

Personal details
- Born: Jeannie Lynn Guenther; April 16, 1950 (age 76) Bakersfield, California, U.S.
- Party: Republican
- Spouse: Russell
- Education: University of California, Santa Barbara; California State University, Los Angeles; California State University, Fresno; Bakersfield College
- Occupation: Educator, politician

Jeannie Lynn "Jean" Fuller (née Guenther; born April 16, 1950) is an American educator and politician who served as the minority leader in the California State Senate. A Republican, she was previously a member of the California Assembly and the Superintendent of Schools for the Bakersfield City School District.

== Early life and education ==
Jean Fuller was born and raised in Shafter, in Kern County. She received her AA degree from Bakersfield College in 1970, her BA from California State University, Fresno in 1972, a Masters in Public Affairs from the California State University, Los Angeles in 1982 and her PhD from the University of California, Santa Barbara in 1989. She supplemented her education with coursework and seminars at the University of Southern California, Harvard University, and Exeter College at Oxford University.

== Career ==
In 1983, Fuller became a School Principal/Director at Keppel Union School District, until 1988.

In 1988, Fuller became an Assistant Superintendent at Keppel Union School District. In 1990, Fuller became a Superintendent at Keppel Union School District, until 1999. In 1999, Fuller became a Superintendent at Bakersfield City School District, until 2006.

Fuller served as an educator in the Central Valley for more than 30 years.

=== Community involvement ===
Fuller's professional and community leadership includes the Kern County Museum Authority Board, the Boys & Girls Clubs of America, Jim Burke Education Leaders Forum, and the Kern County Superintendent's Administrative Advisory. Statewide leadership roles include the California School Boards Association, the Association of School Administrators, and the Institute for Education Reform. Fuller was named California Superintendent of the Year by the American Association of School Administrators in the 2004/2005 school year. Fuller earned national recognition for school improvement in 1998 when she was awarded the AASA Leadership for Learning Award.

=== State politics ===
First elected to the California State Legislature in 2006, Fuller represented the 32nd Assembly district, succeeding fellow Republican Kevin McCarthy, who was elected to Congress. Fuller went on to win election in California's 16th State Senate district in 2010. The 16th district includes parts of Kern, Tulare, and San Bernardino Counties as well as all of Inyo County, and is one of the largest in area in California.

In 2015, Senator Fuller authored SB 111, "Securing Federal Funding for Schools that Serve Military Families." SB 111, which was signed into law by Governor Jerry Brown, provides a 20% matching of funds for 11 California schools near or on a military base, allocating $61 million in federal and state funds.

In 2012, Fuller authored SB 1367, the "Archery Hunting/Firearms Bill." This bill revised the archery provisions of the Fish and Game code to authorize a peace officer to carry a firearm while hunting deer, while prohibiting use of that firearm to illegally hunt deer. SB 1367 was signed into law by Governor Jerry Brown.

Fuller was term-limited from seeking reelection in 2018.
