= California's 8th senatorial district =

American legislative district

California's 8th State Senate district
Current senator
Angelique Ashby; D–Sacramento
- Population (2010) • Voting age • Citizen voting age: 929,712; 694,800; 606,375
- Demographics: 56.00% White; 4.07% Black; 28.22% Latino; 8.72% Asian; 1.94% Native American; 0.27% Hawaiian/Pacific Islander; 0.28% other; 0.51% remainder of multiracial
- Registered voters: 540,098
- Registration: 39.43% Republican; 33.09% Democratic; 21.00% No party preference

California's 8th State Senate district is one of 40 California State Senate districts. It is currently represented by Angelique Ashby of Sacramento.

== District profile ==
The district is located in the core of the Sacramento metropolitan area, consisting of the state capital of Sacramento and several of its surrounding suburbs, including Rio Linda, McClellan Park, North Highlands, Vineyard, Rosemont, Florin, and Elk Grove.

== Election results from statewide races ==
Year	Office	Results
2020	President	Trump 50.6 – 44.0%
2018	Governor	Cox 57.4 – 42.6%
2018	Senator	de Leon 55.6 – 44.4%
2016	President	Trump 52.3 – 41.9%
2016	Senator	Harris 57.0 – 43.0%
2014	Governor	Kashkari 56.5 – 43.5%
2012	President	Romney 54.6 – 43.0%
2012	Senator	Emken 55.5 – 44.5%

== List of senators representing the district ==
Due to redistricting, the 8th district has been moved around different parts of the state. The current iteration resulted from the 2021 redistricting by the California Citizens Redistricting Commission.

Senators	Party	Years served	Counties represented	Notes
Jeremiah Lynch	Democratic	January 8, 1883 – January 3, 1887	San Francisco, San Mateo	
John Boggs	Democratic	January 3, 1887 – January 5, 1891	Colusa, Tehama	
Henry C. Wilson	Democratic	January 5, 1891 – January 7, 1895	Colusa, Tehama	
Henry C. Wilson	Democratic	January 5, 1891 – January 7, 1895	Butte, Tehama	
John Henry Seawell	Democratic	January 7, 1895 – January 2, 1899	Colusa, Glenn, Mendocino	
John Boggs	Democratic	January 2, 1899 – January 30, 1899	Colusa, Glenn, Mendocino	Died in office.
Vacant		January 30, 1899 – March 17, 1899	Colusa, Glenn, Mendocino	
James Wilkens Goad	Democratic	March 17, 1899 – January 5, 1903	Colusa, Glenn, Mendocino	Sworn in after winning special election.
Edward F. Woodward	Republican	January 5, 1903 – January 7, 1907	Sonoma	
Walter Fitch Price	Republican	January 7, 1907 – January 2, 1911	Sonoma	
Louis W. Juilliard	Democratic	January 2, 1911 – January 4, 1915	Sonoma	
Herbert W. Slater	Democratic	January 4, 1915 – January 5, 1931	Sonoma	
John L. Moran	Republican	January 5, 1931 – January 7, 1935	Colusa, Glenn, Tehama	
Daniel Jack Metzger	Republican	January 7, 1935 – January 4, 1943	Colusa, Glenn, Tehama	
Clair Engle	Democratic	January 4, 1943 – September 14, 1943	Colusa, Glenn, Tehama	Resigned after he won special election for the 2nd Congressional district.
Vacant		September 14, 1943 – June 2, 1944	Colusa, Glenn, Tehama	
Louis G. Sutton	Republican	June 2, 1944 – January 5, 1959	Colusa, Glenn, Tehama	Sworn in after winning special election.
Virgil O'Sullivan	Democratic	January 5, 1959 – January 2, 1967	Colusa, Glenn, Tehama	
Lewis F. Sherman	Republican	January 2, 1967 – January 4, 1971	Alameda	
John W. Holmdahl	Democratic	January 4, 1971 – October 15, 1982	Alameda	Resigned from the Senate.
Vacant		October 15, 1982 – December 6, 1982	Alameda	
John Francis Foran	Democratic	December 6, 1982 – November 30, 1986	San Francisco, San Mateo	
Quentin L. Kopp	Independent	December 1, 1986 – November 30, 1998	San Francisco, San Mateo	
Jackie Speier	Democratic	December 7, 1998 – November 30, 2006	San Francisco, San Mateo	
Leland Yee	Democratic	December 4, 2006 – March 28, 2014	San Francisco, San Mateo	Suspended by the Senate after being charged by the Federal Government with conspiracy to traffic in firearms without a license and accepting campaign funds in exchange for political favors.
Vacant		March 28, 2014 – December 1, 2014	Amador, Calaveras, Fresno, Inyo, Madera, Mariposa, Mono, Sacramento, Stanislaus, Tulare, Tuolumne	
Tom Berryhill	Republican	December 1, 2014 – November 30, 2018	Amador, Calaveras, Fresno, Inyo, Madera, Mariposa, Mono, Sacramento, Stanislaus, Tulare, Tuolumne	
Andreas Borgeas	Republican	December 3, 2018 – November 30, 2022	Amador, Calaveras, Fresno, Inyo, Madera, Mariposa, Mono, Sacramento, Stanislaus, Tulare, Tuolumne	
Angelique Ashby	Democratic	December 5, 2022 – present	Sacramento	

== Election results (1990-present) ==
=== 2022 ===
2022 California State Senate 8th district election
Primary election
Party	Candidate	Votes	%
Democratic	Dave Jones	69,269	46.0
Democratic	Angelique Ashby	61,700	41.0
Democratic	Rafa Garcia	18,947	12.6
Republican	Susan Mason (write-in)	527	0.4
Total votes		150,443	100.0
General election
Democratic	Angelique Ashby	118,135	51.5
Democratic	Dave Jones	111,035	48.5
Total votes		229,170	100.0
Democratic gain from Republican			

=== 2018 ===
2018 California State Senate 8th district election
Primary election
Party	Candidate	Votes	%
Republican	Andreas Borgeas	117,673	59.4
Democratic	Paulina Miranda	42,044	21.2
Democratic	Tom Pratt	30,984	15.6
No party preference	Mark Belden	7,304	3.7
Total votes		198,005	100.0
General election
Republican	Andreas Borgeas	202,741	59.6
Democratic	Paulina Miranda	137,311	40.4
Total votes		340,052	100.0
Republican hold			

=== 2014 ===
2014 California State Senate 8th district election
Primary election
Party	Candidate	Votes	%
Republican	Tom Berryhill (incumbent)	97,056	65.4
Democratic	Paulina Miranda	51,415	34.6
Total votes		148,471	100.0
General election
Republican	Tom Berryhill (incumbent)	145,587	66.5
Democratic	Paulina Miranda	73,417	33.5
Total votes		219,004	100.0
Republican gain from Democratic			

=== 2010 ===
2010 California State Senate 8th district election
Party	Candidate	Votes	%
Democratic	Leland Yee (incumbent)	197,070	79.0
Republican	Doo Sup Park	52,587	21.0
Total votes		249,657	100.0
Democratic hold			

=== 2006 ===
2006 California State Senate 8th district election
Party	Candidate	Votes	%
Democratic	Leland Yee	179,556	78.0
Republican	Michael Skipakevich	50,670	22.0
Total votes		230,226	100.0
Democratic hold			

=== 2002 ===
2002 California State Senate 8th district election
Party	Candidate	Votes	%
Democratic	Jackie Speier (incumbent)	158,999	78.2
Republican	Dennis Zell	38,881	19.1
Libertarian	Robert Fliegler	5,540	2.7
Total votes		203,420	100.0
Democratic hold			

=== 1998 ===
1998 California State Senate 8th district election
Party	Candidate	Votes	%
Democratic	Jackie Speier	167,216	79.2
Republican	Jim R. Tomlin	43,936	20.8
Total votes		211,152	100.0
Democratic gain from Independent			

=== 1994 ===
1994 California State Senate 8th district election
Party	Candidate	Votes	%
Independent	Quentin L. Kopp (incumbent)	135,712	63.5
Democratic	Patrick C. Fitzgerald	42,630	20.0
Republican	Tom Spinosa	30,753	14.4
Libertarian	Mark Valverde	4,512	2.1
Total votes		213,607	100.0
Independent hold			

=== 1990 ===
1990 California State Senate 8th district election
Party	Candidate	Votes	%
Independent	Quentin L. Kopp (incumbent)	116,885	72.7
Democratic	Patrick C. Fitzgerald	28,946	18.0
Republican	Robert Silvestri	14,941	9.3
Total votes		160,772	100.0
Independent hold			

== See also ==
- California State Senate Districts
- California State Senate
- Districts in California
