= Dean Florez =

American politician (born 1963)

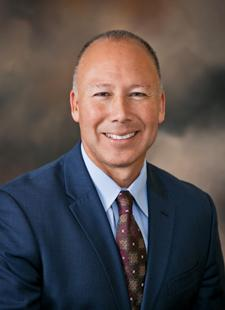

Majority Leader of the California Senate
- In office 2008–2010
- Preceded by: Gloria Romero
- Succeeded by: Ellen Corbett

Member of the California Senate from the 16th district
- In office December 2, 2002 – November 30, 2010
- Preceded by: Jim Costa
- Succeeded by: Michael Rubio

Member of the California State Assembly from the 30th district
- In office December 7, 1998 – November 30, 2002
- Preceded by: Robert Prenter
- Succeeded by: Nicole Parra

Personal details
- Born: April 5, 1963 (age 63) Shafter, California, U.S.
- Party: Democratic
- Spouse: Elsa Florez
- Education: University of California, Los Angeles; Harvard Business School
- Profession: Politician
- Website: https://www.balancebpr.com/

Dean Raymond Florez (born April 5, 1963) is an American former politician who served as a California State Senator from the 16th Senate District, who served from 2002 until the end of his second term in November 2010.

He was first elected to the California State Assembly in 1998 and served two terms. His mostly rural district stretches across 300 miles anchored by the city of Bakersfield in the south and the city of Fresno at its northern tip. On December 1, 2008, he was named Senate Majority Leader by Senate President pro Tempore Darrell Steinberg (D-Sacramento).

On April 3, 2009, Florez announced his candidacy for the Democratic nomination for Lt. Governor. He later announced his support for eventual winner Gavin Newsom.

== Early life and education ==
Florez was born and reared in the Central Valley. The grandson of farm laborers, Florez spent his early years in the Colonia outside of the city of Shafter, in Kern County. He graduated from Shafter High School, attended Bakersfield College, and earned his bachelor's degree in political science from UCLA, where he was student body president. After graduation, he worked in the Legislature as a legislative and budget consultant. He then went on to receive his MBA from Harvard Business School.

== Legislation ==
Florez has legislated in areas of clean air, farm worker safety, high-speed rail, and government accountability. He has served as Chairman of numerous committees with jurisdiction over food and agriculture; water, parks and wildlife; banking, commerce and international trade; and government oversight.

In 2002, as Chair of the Joint Legislative Audit Committee, Florez led an investigation into the state's software $95 million, no bid contract with Oracle. Florez's effort recovered $95 million for the state. In addition, the state established new guidelines for the purchase of computer and technology related services.

Florez sponsored SB 700, which required farms, for the first time ever, to comply with provisions of the Federal Clean Air Act. Other legislation phases out the age-old practice of burning agricultural waste while taking into consideration the needs of farmers to find an alternative disposal method by giving biomass facilities added incentive to take farm waste over urban construction debris. SB 700 required permits for agricultural sources that annually emit a certain number of tons of nitrogen oxide (NOx) and/or volatile organic compounds (VOC), depending on the air basin.

Florez also worked to establish a Tsunami Warning System in the wake of the Thai tsunamis that devastated tourism in that area.

Florez advocated against the importation and application of sewage sludge in his District and has fought against proposed mega-dumps and super-dairies. Florez has brought to the forefront of discussion how rural California is often used as the dumping ground for California's waste and societal problems through laws, regulations, and common practice. Florez spearheaded Measure E in 2006, which banned the spreading of sludge on unincorporated farmland in Kern County. This local measure had bipartisan support.

Florez promoted farm worker safety. As an Assembly member, Florez introduced a bill that required seats in agricultural labor vans to be firmly secured and outlawed wood benches in worker vans. He advocated for agriculture workers to avoid heat illness, which became permanent CalOSHA regulations. He also authored the Pesticide Drift Exposure Response Act, which was signed by Governor Schwarzenegger in 2004. The Pesticide Drift Exposure Response Act requires the responsible parties to reimburse victims for medical bills related to incidents not covered by existing workers’ compensation laws with pesticide drift.

The Chronicle for Higher Education has cited Florez's efforts to investigate whether publicly funded schools in California are complying with Federal Title IX requirements to provide equal opportunities for male and female students in athletics and education. Following a $5.85 million sex discrimination verdict against California State University, Fresno, Florez prodded the Senate to create the Senate Select Committee on Gender Discrimination and Title IX Implementation, which he chaired.

Florez, who represented one of the largest districts in the state, switched to a hybrid vehicle in an effort to save taxpayers money on gas. In the end, he was the only legislator who chose to reimburse the state for the cost of driving throughout his district.

== Post-Senate ==
Upon leaving the California State Senate, Florez became the president of the 20 Million Minds Foundation, where he focused on reducing obstacles associated with higher education in the U.S. with access to free and affordable textbooks. He worked to establish public and private partnerships that increased access and affordability to open source materials for college students. As part of the work Florez did with foundation, he advocated for policies to create open source digital libraries for college textbooks. In 2012, Governor Jerry Brown signed SB 1052 and SB 1053, laws that were designed to provide students at public postsecondary institutions with access to free digital textbooks for popular lower-division courses.

After leaving the 20 Million Minds Foundation, Florez founded Balance Public Relations and Strategies in 2014. Balance Public Relations is a full service strategic consulting firm that supports private and public clients where innovation and regulation intersect. Florez's firm specializes in information technology, impact driven startups, procurement processes, water politics and policy. With deep ties to local, state, and federal leaders, Balance Public Relations has built a foundation with policymakers and stakeholders that has spanned three decades. Over the years, Florez has demonstrated industry-specific expertise in risk management and policy strategy for marketplace startups in the sharing, gig, on-demand, peer-to-peer and collaborative economy. Florez is regarded as a trusted advisor to key internal and external stakeholder groups ranging from executive teams and management, to C-suite, board of directors, investors, and policymakers.

In 2016, Florez was appointed to the California Air Resources Board, also known as CARB or ARB. CARB is the "clean air agency" in California. On CARB, Florez represents social justice communities. Florez was appointed by the Senate Rules Committee, California Senate President pro Tempore Kevin de León. In 2020, he was reappointed by the Senate Rules Committee, California Senate President Pro Tempore Toni Atkins. Florez has distinguished himself as an advocate for some of the most vulnerable environmental justice communities by fighting for clean air policies and for taking bold action on climate change.

California Assembly
Preceded by Robert Prenter	California State Assembly, 30th District; 1998-2002	Succeeded by Nicole Parra
California Senate
Preceded by Jim Costa	California State Senate, 16th District; 2002-2010	Succeeded by Michael Rubio
