= Michael Rubio =

American politician

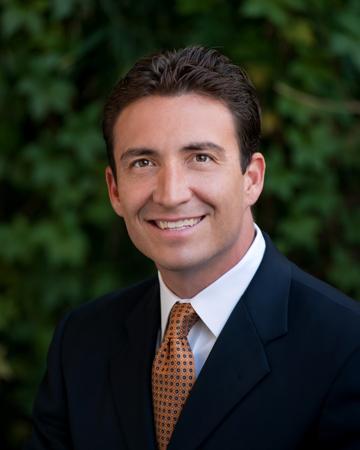
- Official portrait, 2011

Member of the California Senate from the 16th district
- In office December 6, 2010 – February 22, 2013
- Preceded by: Dean Florez
- Succeeded by: Andy Vidak

Member of the Kern County Board of Supervisors from the 5th District
- In office January 3, 2005 – December 6, 2010
- Preceded by: Pete Parra
- Succeeded by: Karen Goh

Personal details
- Born: August 24, 1977 (age 49) Lost Hills, California, U.S.
- Party: Democratic
- Spouse: Dora Rubio
- Children: 2
- Education: Bakersfield College; University of New Haven
- Profession: Politician
- Website: Senate Website

Michael J. Rubio (born August 24, 1977) is a former California State Senator representing the 16th Senate District before resigning on February 22, 2013. He previously served as Fifth District Kern County Supervisor representing the communities of Arvin, Lamont, and East Bakersfield.

== Career ==
Rubio put himself through Bakersfield College and subsequently studied Justice Administration at the University of New Haven in Connecticut, graduating with honors in Criminology. He worked for the United States Department of Justice, then returned to Kern County with a job as an advocate for youth and led an agency that provided health insurance to underprivileged children.

For four years, Rubio worked for State Senator Dean Florez. In Florez's Sacramento office, Rubio worked on issues such as the quality of air in the San Joaquin Valley, opposing sludge coming into Kern County from Los Angeles and other surrounding areas, as well as initiatives in education.

Rubio was elected to the 16th State Senate District in November 2010, representing all or portions of Fresno, Kern, Kings and Tulare counties.

In March 2004, Rubio was elected to represent the Fifth District on the Kern County Board of Supervisors and, at the time, became the youngest elected supervisor in California. Rubio had the distinction of being the state's youngest senator when he served in the California State Senate.

While on the Kern County Board of Supervisors, Senator Rubio spearheaded the Kern County Renewable Energy initiative and has worked to facilitate the development of some of the largest solar and wind projects in California. Rubio led the effort to combat gang violence within the southern Central Valley. The Kern County Gang Violence Strategic Plan, authored by Rubio when he was a supervisor, guided the tripling of the Sheriff's Gang Unit and created mentoring and after-school programs to steer children away from gangs.

He was also awarded the John F. Kennedy Jr. Leadership Award from the California Democratic Party and the German Marshall Memorial Fellowship from the German Marshall Fund of the United States. Rubio received the Kern COG Regional Award of Merit – Distinguished Leadership / Elected Official and completed the Senior Executives in State and Local Government program at the John F. Kennedy School of Government at Harvard University.

Rubio resigned from the California Senate in late February 2013 to take a government-affairs job with Chevron Corporation. In explaining his decision, Rubio cited the 300-mile drive from his district to Sacramento and the attention required by his daughter with special needs.

== Committees ==
While in the Senate, Rubio served as Vice Chair of the Senate Agriculture Committee and as a member of the Budget and Fiscal Review, Energy, Utilities and Communications, Health, Transportation and Housing, Veterans Affairs, and Joint Legislative Audit Committee.

== State Senate candidacy ==
In July 2008, Rubio announced his intention to run for state senate when Senator Florez's term expires in 2010. He chose not to accept voluntary spending limits and expected to spend $1 million on his campaign.

In June 2010, Kern County Clerk Ann Barnett revealed that Rubio was living in the 18th Senate District, calling into question his eligibility to run for office in the 16th. In 2001, Rubio's precinct was incorrectly drawn into the 16th State Senate District. The Democratic California Secretary of State Debra Bowen ruled that Rubio's name would remain on the ballot. Acting in good faith to further address the situation, Rubio and his family immediately moved to a house inside the district in East Bakersfield. He subsequently released a radio ad about the incident citing the mistake as yet another example of broken government.

On Tuesday, November 2, Michael J. Rubio was elected to represent the 16th District in the California State Senate. He defeated his Republican opponent, Tim Thiesen, with over 60% of the vote.

=== Opposition to Proposition 19 ===
Rubio came out against Proposition 19, the Regulate, Control and Tax Cannabis Act of 2010. He characterized the initiative as "bad public policy" and spent $20,000 of his own campaign money to air radio ads opposing the proposition.

=== Personal life ===
Rubio lives in East Bakersfield with his wife, Dora, and their daughter, Illiana. Dora Rubio was a superdelegate to the 2008 Democratic National Convention.
