= 1994 California State Senate election =

- November 8, 1994

20 seats from even-numbered districts in the California State Senate 21 seats needed for a majority
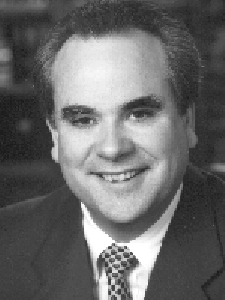

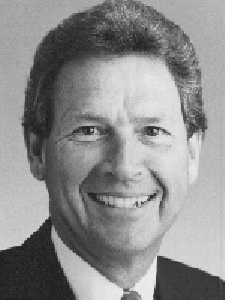
	Majority party	Minority party
Leader	Bill Lockyer	Kenneth Maddy
Party	Democratic	Republican
Leader's seat	10th–Hayward	14th–Fresno
Seats before	23	15
Seats after	21	17
Seat change	▼2	▲2
Popular vote	1,794,231	1,596,944
Percentage	49.49%	44.05%
- Results: Democratic gain Republican gain Democratic hold Republican hold Independent hold No election held
President pro tempore before election
Bill Lockyer
Democratic
President pro tempore-designate
Bill Lockyer
Democratic

The 1994 California State Senate elections were held on November 8, 1994. Senate seats of even-numbered districts were up for election. Senate terms are staggered so that half the membership is elected every two years. Senators serve four-year terms and are limited to two terms. The Democrats lost two seats to the Republicans, but maintained a majority in the Senate.

== Overview ==
California State Senate elections, 1994
Party	Votes	Percentage	Not up	Incumbents	Open	Before	After	+/–
Democratic	1,794,231	49.49%	10	10	3	23	21	-2
Republican	1,596,944	44.05%	9	4	2	15	17	+2
Independent	135,712	3.74%	1	1	0	2	2	0
Libertarian	58,576	1.62%	0	0	0	0	0	0
Peace and Freedom	39,835	1.10%	0	0	0	0	0	0
Invalid or blank votes	307,595	7.82%	—	—	—	—	—	—
Totals	3,932,893	100.00%	20	15	5	40	40	—

== Results ==
Final results from the California Secretary of State:

=== District 2 ===
California's 2nd State Senate district election, 1994
Party	Candidate	Votes	%
Democratic	Mike Thompson (incumbent)	162,610	60.41
Republican	Frank McMichael	95,275	35.40
Peace and Freedom	Pamela Elizondo	11,289	4.19
Invalid or blank votes		19,969	5.65
Total votes		289,143	100.00
Democratic hold			

=== District 4 ===
California's 4th State Senate district election, 1994
Party	Candidate	Votes	%
Republican	Maurice Johannessen (incumbent)	133,101	54.38
Democratic	Michael H. McGowan	111,667	45.62
Invalid or blank votes		16,164	6.19
Total votes		260,932	100.00
Republican hold			

=== District 6 ===
California's 6th State Senate district election, 1994
Party	Candidate	Votes	%
Democratic	Leroy F. Greene (incumbent)	125,138	53.71
Republican	Dave Cox	107,853	46.29
Invalid or blank votes		15,686	6.31
Total votes		248,677	100.00
Democratic hold			

=== District 8 ===
California's 8th State Senate district election, 1994
Party	Candidate	Votes	%
Independent	Quentin L. Kopp	135,712	63.53
Democratic	Patrick C. Fitzgerald	42,630	19.96
Republican	Tom Spinosa	30,753	14.40
Libertarian	Mark Valverde	4,512	2.11
Invalid or blank votes		30,076	12.34
Total votes		216,613	100.00
Independent hold			

=== District 10 ===
California's 10th State Senate district election, 1994
Party	Candidate	Votes	%
Democratic	Bill Lockyer (incumbent)	124,365	62.97
Republican	Anthony R. Smith, Sr.	73,141	37.03
Invalid or blank votes		20,978	9.60
Total votes		312,603	100.00
Democratic hold			

=== District 12 ===
California's 12th State Senate district election, 1994
Party	Candidate	Votes	%
Republican	Dick Monteith	100,902	49.45
Democratic	Dan McCorquodale (incumbent)	96,543	47.32
Libertarian	Linda Marie DeGroat	6,596	3.23
Invalid or blank votes		12,090	5.59
Total votes		216,041	100.00
Republican gain from Democratic			

=== District 14 ===
California's 14th State Senate district election, 1994
Party	Candidate	Votes	%
Republican	Kenneth L. Maddy	168,017	70.62
Democratic	Tony Hagopian	69,891	29.38
Invalid or blank votes		14,170	2.46
Total votes		252,078	100.00
Republican hold			

=== District 16 ===
California's 16th State Senate district election, 1994
Party	Candidate	Votes	%
Democratic	Jim Costa	70,329	51.57
Republican	Phil Wyman (incumbent)	66,053	48.43
Invalid or blank votes		8,529	5.89
Total votes		144,911	100.00
Democratic gain from Republican			

=== District 18 ===
California's 18th State Senate district election, 1994
Party	Candidate	Votes	%
Democratic	Jack O'Connell	158,161	59.04
Republican	Steve MacElvaine	109,734	40.96
Invalid or blank votes		11,965	4.28
Total votes		279,860	100.00
Democratic hold			

=== District 20 ===
California's 20th State Senate district election, 1994
Party	Candidate	Votes	%
Democratic	Herschel Rosenthal (incumbent)	75,345	58.46
Republican	Dolores Bender White	53,528	41.54
Invalid or blank votes		14,694	10.23
Total votes		143,567	100.00
Democratic hold			

=== District 22 ===
California's 22nd State Senate district election, 1994
Party	Candidate	Votes	%
Democratic	Richard Polanco	46,613	68.03
Republican	Yong Tai Lee	15,847	23.13
Peace and Freedom	Pearl Wolff	3,845	5.61
Libertarian	Vincent Way	2,217	3.24
Invalid or blank votes		8,764	11.34
Total votes		77,286	100.00
Democratic hold			

=== District 24 ===
California's 24th State Senate district election, 1994
Party	Candidate	Votes	%
Democratic	Hilda Solis	73,371	63.13
Republican	Dave Boyer	37,950	32.65
Libertarian	George Curtis Feger	4,910	4.22
Invalid or blank votes		14,413	11.03
Total votes		130,644	100.00
Democratic hold			

=== District 26 ===
California's 26th State Senate district election, 1994
Party	Candidate	Votes	%
Democratic	Diane Watson (incumbent)	117,204	82.93
Republican	Joe Piechowski	19,245	13.62
Libertarian	Bob Weber	3,042	2.15
Peace and Freedom	Wassin A. Snededdin	1,845	1.31
Invalid or blank votes		14,165	9.11
Total votes		155,501	100.00
Democratic hold			

=== District 28 ===
California's 28th State Senate district election, 1994
Party	Candidate	Votes	%
Democratic	Ralph C. Dills (incumbent)	95,753	50.48
Republican	David Barrett Cohen	81,193	42.80
Peace and Freedom	Cindy V. Henderson	6,698	3.53
Libertarian	Neal Arvid Donner	6,038	3.18
Invalid or blank votes		19,429	9.29
Total votes		209,111	100.00
Democratic hold			

=== District 30 ===
California's 30th State Senate district election, 1994
Party	Candidate	Votes	%
Democratic	Charles Calderon (incumbent)	72,968	67.90
Republican	Ken Gow	34,498	32.10
Invalid or blank votes		12,986	10.78
Total votes		120,452	100.00
Democratic hold			

=== District 32 ===
California's 32nd State Senate district election, 1994
Party	Candidate	Votes	%
Democratic	Ruben Ayala (incumbent)	76,849	60.74
Republican	Earl De Vries	49,667	39.26
Invalid or blank votes		11,966	8.64
Total votes		138,482	100.00
Democratic hold			

=== District 34 ===
California's 34th State Senate district election, 1994
Party	Candidate	Votes	%
Republican	Rob Hurtt (incumbent)	70,404	57.26
Democratic	Donna Chessen	45,027	36.62
Libertarian	Thomas E. Reimer	7,530	6.12
Invalid or blank votes		14,804	10.75
Total votes		137,765	100.00
Republican hold			

=== District 36 ===
California's 36th State Senate district election, 1994
Party	Candidate	Votes	%
Republican	Ray Haynes	121,263	55.00
Democratic	Kay Ceniceros	91,580	41.54
Libertarian	David R. Sarosi	7,637	3.46
Invalid or blank votes		10,222	4.43
Total votes		230,702	100.00
Republican gain from Democratic			

=== District 38 ===
California's 38th State Senate district election, 1994
Party	Candidate	Votes	%
Republican	William A. Craven (incumbent)	156,090	65.53
Democratic	Thomas Berry	60,976	25.60
Libertarian	August Anderson	11,336	4.76
Peace and Freedom	Mary Ann Niki	9,811	4.12
Invalid or blank votes		25,894	9.80
Total votes		264,107	100.00
Republican hold			

=== District 40 ===
California's 40th State Senate district election, 1994
Party	Candidate	Votes	%
Democratic	Stephen Peace (incumbent)	77,211	48.04
Republican	Joe Ghougassian	72,410	45.05
Peace and Freedom	Elena Smith Pelayo	6,347	3.95
Libertarian	Ben Gibbs	4,758	2.96
Invalid or blank votes		10,631	6.20
Total votes		171,357	100.00
Democratic hold			

== See also ==
- California State Assembly
- California State Assembly elections, 1994
- California state elections, 1994
- California State Legislature
- California State Senate Districts
- Districts in California
- Political party strength in U.S. states
