= 1998 California State Senate election =

- November 3, 1998

20 seats from even-numbered districts in the California State Senate 21 seats needed for a majority
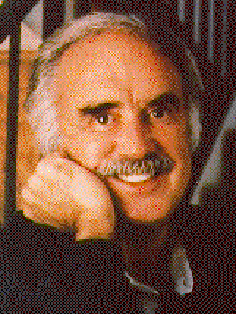

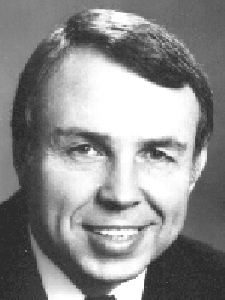
	Majority party	Minority party
Leader	John Burton	Ross Johnson
Party	Democratic	Republican
Leader's seat	3rd–San Francisco	35th–Fullerton
Seats before	23	16
Seats after	25	15
Seat change	▲2	▼1
Popular vote	1,975,326	1,426,014
Percentage	56.49%	40.78%
- Results: Democratic gain Democratic hold Republican hold No election held
President pro tempore before election
John L. Burton
Democratic
President pro tempore-designate
John L. Burton
Democratic

The 1998 California State Senate elections were held on November 3, 1998. Senate seats of even-numbered districts were up for election. Senate terms are staggered so that half the membership is elected every two years. Senators serve four-year terms and are limited to two terms. Democrats expanded their majority, winning a Republican-held seat and an Independent-held seat.

== Overview ==
California State Senate elections, 1998
Party	Votes	Percentage	Not up	Incumbents	Open	Before	After	+/–
Democratic	1,975,326	56.49%	10	5	8	23	25	+2
Republican	1,426,014	40.78%	10	3	3	16	15	-1
Libertarian	57,738	1.65%	0	0	0	0	0	0
Peace and Freedom	26,277	0.75%	0	0	0	0	0	0
Natural Law	5,828	0.17%	0	0	0	0	0	0
Independent	5,504	0.16%	0	0	1	1	0	-1
Invalid or blank votes	342,926	8.93%	—	—	—	—	—	—
Totals	3,839,613	100.00%	20	8	12	40	40	—

== Results ==
Final results from the California Secretary of State:

=== District 2 ===
California's 2nd State Senate district election, 1998
Party	Candidate	Votes	%
Democratic	Wesley Chesbro	137,728	51.18
Republican	John Jordan	112,754	41.90
Peace and Freedom	Brian Garay	18,612	6.92
Invalid or blank votes		17,879	6.23
Total votes		286,793	100.00
Democratic hold			

=== District 4 ===
California's 4th State Senate district election, 1998
Party	Candidate	Votes	%
Republican	Maurice Johannessen (incumbent)	135,528	56.67
Democratic	Mark Desio	103,620	43.33
Invalid or blank votes		19,060	6.15
Total votes		135,528	100.00
Republican hold			

=== District 6 ===
California's 6th State Senate district election, 1998
Party	Candidate	Votes	%
Democratic	Deborah Ortiz	128,949	55.24
Republican	Chris Quackenbush	96,227	41.22
Libertarian	Gerald Klass	8,244	3.53
Invalid or blank votes		12,393	5.04
Total votes		245,813	100.00
Democratic hold			

=== District 8 ===
California's 8th State Senate district election, 1998
Party	Candidate	Votes	%
Democratic	Jackie Speier	167,216	79.19
Republican	Jim R. Tomlin	43,936	20.81
Invalid or blank votes		28,095	11.74
Total votes		239,247	100.00
Democratic gain from Independent			

=== District 10 ===
California's 10th State Senate district election, 1998
Party	Candidate	Votes	%
Democratic	Liz Figueroa	129,496	68.67
Republican	Bob Gough	59,071	31.33
Invalid or blank votes		18,823	9.08
Total votes		207,390	100.00
Democratic hold			

=== District 12 ===
California's 12th State Senate district election, 1998
Party	Candidate	Votes	%
Republican	Dick Monteith (incumbent)	110,690	53.04
Democratic	Sal Canella	91,623	43.90
Libertarian	Mary Lee Gowlan	6,389	3.06
Invalid or blank votes		8,245	3.80
Total votes		216,947	100.00
Republican hold			

=== District 14 ===
California's 14th State Senate district election, 1998
Party	Candidate	Votes	%
Republican	Chuck Poochigian	174,832	100.00
Invalid or blank votes		59,034	25.24
Total votes		233,866	100.00
Republican hold			

=== District 16 ===
California's 16th State Senate district election, 1998
Party	Candidate	Votes	%
Democratic	Jim Costa (incumbent)	92,163	71.91
Republican	Gregg Palmer	36,005	28.09
Invalid or blank votes		9,891	7.16
Total votes		138,059	100.00
Democratic hold			

=== District 18 ===
California's 18th State Senate district election, 1998
Party	Candidate	Votes	%
Democratic	Jack O'Connell (incumbent)	169,818	66.87
Republican	Gordon Klemm	79,872	31.45
Libertarian	Jack Ray	4,276	1.68
Invalid or blank votes		12,531	4.70
Total votes		266,497	100.00
Democratic hold			

=== District 20 ===
California's 20th State Senate district election, 1998
Party	Candidate	Votes	%
Democratic	Richard Alarcón	82,258	65.94
Republican	Ollie M. McCaulley	34,120	27.35
Libertarian	Linda Starr	8,372	6.71
Invalid or blank votes		11,473	8.42
Total votes			100.00
Democratic hold			

=== District 22 ===
California's 22nd State Senate district election, 1998
Party	Candidate	Votes	%
Democratic	Richard G. Polanco (incumbent)	65,104	89.47
Peace and Freedom	Marian 'Muffy' Sunde	7,665	10.53
Invalid or blank votes		11,514	13.66
Total votes		84,283	100.00
Democratic hold			

=== District 24 ===
California's 24th State Senate district election, 1998
Party	Candidate	Votes	%
Democratic	Hilda Solis (incumbent)	86,353	73.51
Republican	C. A. 'Carl' Taylor	28,057	23.88
Libertarian	Kim Goldsworthy	3,059	2.60
Invalid or blank votes		13,687	10.44
Total votes		131,156	100.00
Democratic hold			

=== District 26 ===
California's 26th State Senate district election, 1998
Party	Candidate	Votes	%
Democratic	Kevin Murray	124,328	88.44
Republican	Mac Lane Key	12,798	9.10
Libertarian	Bob Weber	3,460	2.46
Invalid or blank votes		15,874	10.15
Total votes		156,460	100.00
Democratic hold			

=== District 28 ===
California's 28th State Senate district election, 1998
Party	Candidate	Votes	%
Democratic	Debra Bowen	115,672	64.42
Republican	Asha Knott	57,560	32.05
Libertarian	Neal Doner	6,340	3.53
Invalid or blank votes		17,320	8.80
Total votes		196,892	100.00
Democratic hold			

=== District 30 ===
California's 30th State Senate district election, 1998
Party	Candidate	Votes	%
Democratic	Martha Escutia	80,562	73.98
Republican	John O. Robertson	24,520	22.52
Libertarian	John P. McCready	3,816	3.50
Invalid or blank votes		10,674	8.93
Total votes		119,572	100.00
Democratic hold			

=== District 32 ===
California's 32nd State Senate district election, 1998
Party	Candidate	Votes	%
Democratic	Joe Baca	75,424	58.51
Republican	Eunice M. Ulloa	49,201	38.17
Libertarian	John S. Ballard	4,275	3.32
Invalid or blank votes		7,267	5.34
Total votes		136,167	100.00
Democratic hold			

=== District 34 ===
California's 34th State Senate district election, 1998
Party	Candidate	Votes	%
Democratic	Joe Dunn	62,063	51.29
Republican	Rob Hurtt (incumbent)	58,933	48.71
Invalid or blank votes		9,867	7.54
Total votes		130,863	100.00
Democratic gain from Republican			

=== District 36 ===
California's 36th State Senate district election, 1998
Party	Candidate	Votes	%
Republican	Ray Haynes (incumbent)	127,531	60.10
Democratic	George M. Swift	84,683	39.90
Invalid or blank votes		17,798	7.74
Total votes		230,012	100.00
Republican hold			

=== District 38 ===
California's 38th State Senate district election, 1998
Party	Candidate	Votes	%
Republican	Bill Morrow	136,889	60.27
Democratic	Madelene Arakelian	74,597	32.84
Natural Law	Barbara Blair	5,828	2.57
Independent	Eugene Gilbert Carl	5,504	2.42
Libertarian	Paul King	4,315	1.90
Invalid or blank votes		28,712	11.22
Total votes		255,845	100.00
Republican hold			

=== District 40 ===
California's 40th State Senate district election, 1998
Party	Candidate	Votes	%
Democratic	Stephen Peace (incumbent)	103,669	66.31
Republican	Bob Divine	47,490	30.37
Libertarian	David N. Graham	5,192	3.32
Invalid or blank votes		12,789	7.56
Total votes		169,140	100.00
Democratic hold			

== See also ==
- California State Assembly
- California State Assembly elections, 1998
- California state elections, 1998
- California State Legislature
- California State Senate Districts
- Districts in California
- Political party strength in U.S. states
