= California's 20th district =

California's 20th district may refer to:

- California's 20th congressional district
- California's 20th State Assembly district
- California's 20th State Senate district
