= California's 22nd district =

California's 22nd district may refer to:

- California's 22nd congressional district
- California's 22nd State Assembly district
- California's 22nd State Senate district
