= California's 24th senatorial district =

American legislative district

California's 24th State Senate district
Current senator
Ben Allen; D–Santa Monica
- Population (2010) • Voting age • Citizen voting age: 933,510; 710,984; 408,806
- Demographics: 11.98% White; 3.11% Black; 66.72% Latino; 17.23% Asian; 0.25% Native American; 0.08% Hawaiian/Pacific Islander; 0.28% other; 0.35% remainder of multiracial
- Registered voters: 451,223
- Registration: 60.79% Democratic; 8.40% Republican; 25.66% No party preference

California's 24th senatorial district is one of 40 California State Senate districts. It is currently represented by Democrat Ben Allen of Santa Monica.

== District profile ==
The district encompasses the Westside Los Angeles neighborhoods of Venice, West Los Angeles, Pacific Palisades, Brentwood, Bel Air, Century City, Sunset Strip, Laurel Canyon, Hollywood, and Miracle Mile; and the Santa Monica Mountains cities such as Hidden Hills, Calabasas, Topanga, and Malibu. In addition, the district includes most of the South Bay cities of Los Angeles County, including Rancho Palos Verdes, Rolling Hills, Torrance, Redondo Beach, Manhattan Beach, El Segundo, Marina del Rey, Santa Monica, Beverly Hills, and West Hollywood.

== Election results from statewide races ==
Year	Office	Results
2021	Recall	No 84.9 – 15.1%
2020	President	Biden 81.6 – 16.2%
2018	Governor	Newsom 85.8 – 14.2%
2018	Senator	Feinstein 51.5 – 48.5%
2016	President	Clinton 84.1 – 10.3%
2016	Senator	Harris 56.1 – 43.9%
2014	Governor	Brown 85.0 – 15.0%
2012	President	Obama 83.6 – 13.3%
2012	Senator	Feinstein 85.6 – 14.4%

== List of senators representing the district ==
Due to redistricting, the 24th district has been moved around different parts of the state. The current iteration resulted from the 2021 redistricting by the California Citizens Redistricting Commission.

=== 1883–1887: two seats ===
Years	Seat A			Seat B			Counties represented
Years	Member	Party	Electoral history	Member	Party	Electoral history	Counties represented
January 8, 1883 – January 3, 1887	Charles W. Cross (Nevada City)	Democratic	Elected in 1882. [data missing]	Hiram W. Wallis (Forest City)	Republican	Elected in 1882. [data missing]	Nevada, Sierra

=== 1887–present: one seat ===
Senators	Party	Years served	Electoral history	Counties represented
P. J. Murphy (San Francisco)	Democratic	January 3, 1887 – January 5, 1891	Elected in 1886. Lost re-election.	San Francisco
J. H. Mahoney (San Francisco)	Republican	January 5, 1891 – January 2, 1893	Elected in 1890. Redistricted to the 18th district.	San Francisco
George H. Williams (San Francisco)	Republican	January 5, 1891 – January 2, 1893	Redistricted from the 20th district and re-elected in 1892. [data missing]	San Francisco
J. H. Mahoney (San Francisco)	Republican	January 2, 1893 – January 2, 1899	Redistricted from the 18th district and re-elected in 1894. [data missing]	San Francisco
R. Porter Ashe (San Francisco)	Democratic	January 2, 1899 – January 5, 1903	Elected in 1898. [data missing]	San Francisco
George H. Williams (San Francisco)	Republican	January 5, 1903 – July 17, 1903	Elected in 1902. Died.	San Francisco
Vacant		July 17, 1903 – January 2, 1905		San Francisco
Philip J. Haskins (San Francisco)	Republican	January 2, 1905 – January 7, 1907	Elected in 1904. [data missing]	San Francisco
Marc Anthony (San Francisco)	Republican	January 7, 1907 – January 2, 1911	Elected in 1906. [data missing]	San Francisco
D. J. Beban (San Francisco)	Republican	January 2, 1911 – January 4, 1915	Elected in 1910. Redistricted to the 18th district.	San Francisco
Lawrence J. Flaherty (San Francisco)	Republican	January 4, 1915 – January 8, 1923	Elected in 1914. Re-elected in 1918. [data missing]	San Francisco
Daniel C. Murphy (San Francisco)	Democratic	January 8, 1923 – January 5, 1931	Elected in 1922. Re-elected in 1926. [data missing]	San Francisco
Andrew R. Schottky (Los Banos)	Republican	January 5, 1931 – January 2, 1939	Elected in 1930. Re-elected in 1934. [data missing]	Madera, Merced
Peter P. Myhand (Merced)	Democratic	January 2, 1939 – January 4, 1943	Elected in 1938. [data missing]	Madera, Merced
George J. Hatfield (Stevinson)	Republican	January 4, 1943 – November 15, 1953	Elected in 1942. Re-elected in 1946. Re-elected in 1950. Died.	Madera, Merced
Vacant		November 15, 1953 – January 3, 1955		Madera, Merced
James A. Cobey (Merced)	Democratic	January 3, 1955 – January 2, 1967	Elected in 1954. Re-elected in 1958. Re-elected in 1962. Redistricted to the 15th district and lost re-election.	Madera, Merced
Robert J. Lagomarsino (Ojai)	Republican	January 2, 1967 – March 13, 1974	Redistricted from the 33rd district and re-elected in 1966. Re-elected in 1970. Resigned when elected to the U.S. House of Representatives.	Ventura, Santa Barbara
Vacant		March 13, 1974 – July 9, 1974		Ventura, Santa Barbara
Omer Rains (Ventura)	Democratic	July 9, 1974 – November 30, 1974	Elected to finish Lagomarsino's term. Redistricted to the 18th district.	Ventura, Santa Barbara
Alex P. Garcia (Los Angeles)	Democratic	December 2, 1974 – November 30, 1982	Elected in 1974. Re-elected in 1978. Lost renomination.	Los Angeles
Art Torres (Los Angeles)	Democratic	December 6, 1982 – November 30, 1994	Elected in 1982. Re-elected in 1986. Re-elected in 1990. Retired to run for California Insurance Commissioner.	Los Angeles
Hilda Solis (Los Angeles)	Democratic	December 5, 1994 – December 31, 2000	Elected in 1994. Re-elected in 1998. Resigned to become a member of the U.S. House of Representatives.	Los Angeles
Vacant		December 31, 2000 – March 12, 2001		Los Angeles
Gloria Romero (Los Angeles)	Democratic	March 12, 2001 – November 30, 2010	Elected to finish Solis's term. Re-elected in 2002. Re-elected in 2006. Term-limited and retired.	Los Angeles
Ed Hernandez (Los Angeles)	Democratic	December 6, 2010 – November 30, 2014	Elected in 2010. Redistricted to the 22nd district.	Los Angeles
Kevin de León (Los Angeles)	Democratic	December 1, 2014 – November 30, 2018	Redistricted from the 22nd district and re-elected in 2014. Term-limited and ran for U.S. Senate.	Los Angeles
María Elena Durazo (Los Angeles)	Democratic	December 3, 2018 – November 30, 2022	Elected in 2018. Redistricted to the 26th district.	Los Angeles
Ben Allen (Malibu)	Democratic	December 5, 2022 – present	Redistricted from the 26th district and re-elected in 2022. Term-limited and retiring at end of term.	Los Angeles

== Election results (1990-present) ==
=== 2022 ===
2022 California State Senate 24th district election
Primary election
Party	Candidate	Votes	%
Democratic	Ben Allen (incumbent)	165,421	96.2
Republican	Kristina Irwin (write-in)	6,260	3.6
Republican	Edwin P. Duterte (write-in)	213	0.1
Total votes		171,894	100.0
General election
Democratic	Ben Allen (incumbent)	248,642	67.1
Republican	Kristina Irwin	121,809	32.9
Total votes		370,451	100.0
Democratic hold			

=== 2018 ===
2018 California State Senate 24th district election
Primary election
Party	Candidate	Votes	%
Democratic	Maria Elena Durazo	63,719	69.8
Democratic	Peter Choi	27,566	30.2
Total votes		91,285	100.0
General election
Democratic	Maria Elena Durazo	139,473	66.9
Democratic	Peter Choi	69,160	33.1
Total votes		208,633	100.0
Democratic hold			

=== 2014 ===
2014 California State Senate 24th district election
Primary election
Party	Candidate	Votes	%
Democratic	Kevin de León (incumbent)	28,975	64.1
Democratic	Peter Choi	9,422	20.8
Republican	William "Rodriguez" Morrison	6,805	15.1
Total votes		45,202	100.0
General election
Democratic	Kevin de León (incumbent)	57,412	65.8
Democratic	Peter Choi	29,848	34.2
Total votes		87,260	100.0
Democratic hold			

=== 2010 ===
2010 California State Senate 24th district election
Party	Candidate	Votes	%
Democratic	Ed Hernandez	112,792	100.0
Republican	William Rodriguez Morrison (write-in)	22	0.0
Total votes		112,814	100.0
Democratic hold			

=== 2006 ===
2006 California State Senate 24th district election
Party	Candidate	Votes	%
Democratic	Gloria Romero (incumbent)	92,498	74.1
Republican	Robert Carver	32,388	25.9
Total votes		124,886	100.0
Democratic hold			

=== 2002 ===
2002 California State Senate 24th district election
Party	Candidate	Votes	%
Democratic	Gloria Romero (incumbent)	79,227	71.3
Republican	Vince House	29,124	26.2
Libertarian	Carl M. "Marty" Swinney	2,741	2.5
Total votes		111,092	100.0
Democratic hold			

=== 2001 (special) ===
2001 California State Senate 24th district special election Vacancy resulting from the resignation of Hilda Solis
Party	Candidate	Votes	%
Democratic	Gloria Romero	26,959	50.5
Democratic	Martin Gallegos	13,676	27.1
Republican	Vince House	7,352	14.6
Libertarian	Carl M. "Marty" Swinney	695	1.4
Total votes		48,682	100.0
Democratic hold			

=== 1998 ===
1998 California State Senate 24th district election
Party	Candidate	Votes	%
Democratic	Hilda Solis (incumbent)	86,353	73.5
Republican	C. A. 'Carl' Taylor	28,057	23.9
Libertarian	Kim Goldsworthy	3,059	2.6
Total votes		117,469	100.0
Democratic hold			

=== 1994 ===
1994 California State Senate 24th district election
Party	Candidate	Votes	%
Democratic	Hilda Solis	73,371	63.1
Republican	Dave Boyer	37,950	32.7
Libertarian	George Curtis Feger	4,910	4.2
Total votes		116,231	100.0
Democratic hold			

=== 1990 ===
1990 California State Senate 24th district election
Party	Candidate	Votes	%
Democratic	Art Torres (incumbent)	39,644	39.0
Republican	Keith F. Marsh	14,157	24.6
Libertarian	David L. Wilson	3,685	6.4
Total votes		57,486	100.0
Democratic hold			

== See also ==
- California State Senate
- California State Senate districts
- Districts in California
