= 2008 California Proposition 93 =

Proposition 93 was a Californian ballot proposition that sought to amend the term limits law for the California state legislature. Voters rejected it on February 5, 2008.

== Proposal ==
Between the passage of Proposition 140 in 1990 and the passage of Proposition 28 in 2012, California allows a person to serve 6 years in the California State Assembly and 8 years in the California State Senate. Proposition 93 would have changed the term limit to 12 years in both houses combined. If passed, the measure would have been the first amendment to the term limits law since Proposition 140 in 1990.

The proposition would have reduced the total number of years a person could serve in the state legislature from 14 to 12 years, while allowing current members to serve 12 years in their current house regardless of prior service. Consequently, some current members of the legislature would have been allowed to serve beyond the 14 years prescribed by current term limit laws.

The later, successful, Proposition 28 in 2012 did not apply such an advantageous set of rules to the current legislators; it kept them on the old rules rather than giving them a new set of rules better than either the old or new rules.

== Results ==
No 50%–60% 60%–70% Yes 50%–60%

Proposition 93
Choice	Votes	%
For	3,961,466	46.41
Against	4,574,826	53.59
Total	8,536,292	100.00
Valid votes	8,536,292	94.13
Invalid/blank votes	532,123	5.87
Total votes	9,068,415	100.00
Registered voters/turnout		57.71

== See also ==
- 2012 California Proposition 28, a successful proposition proposing a similar change four years later
