= Alan Sieroty =

American attorney and politician (1930–2024)

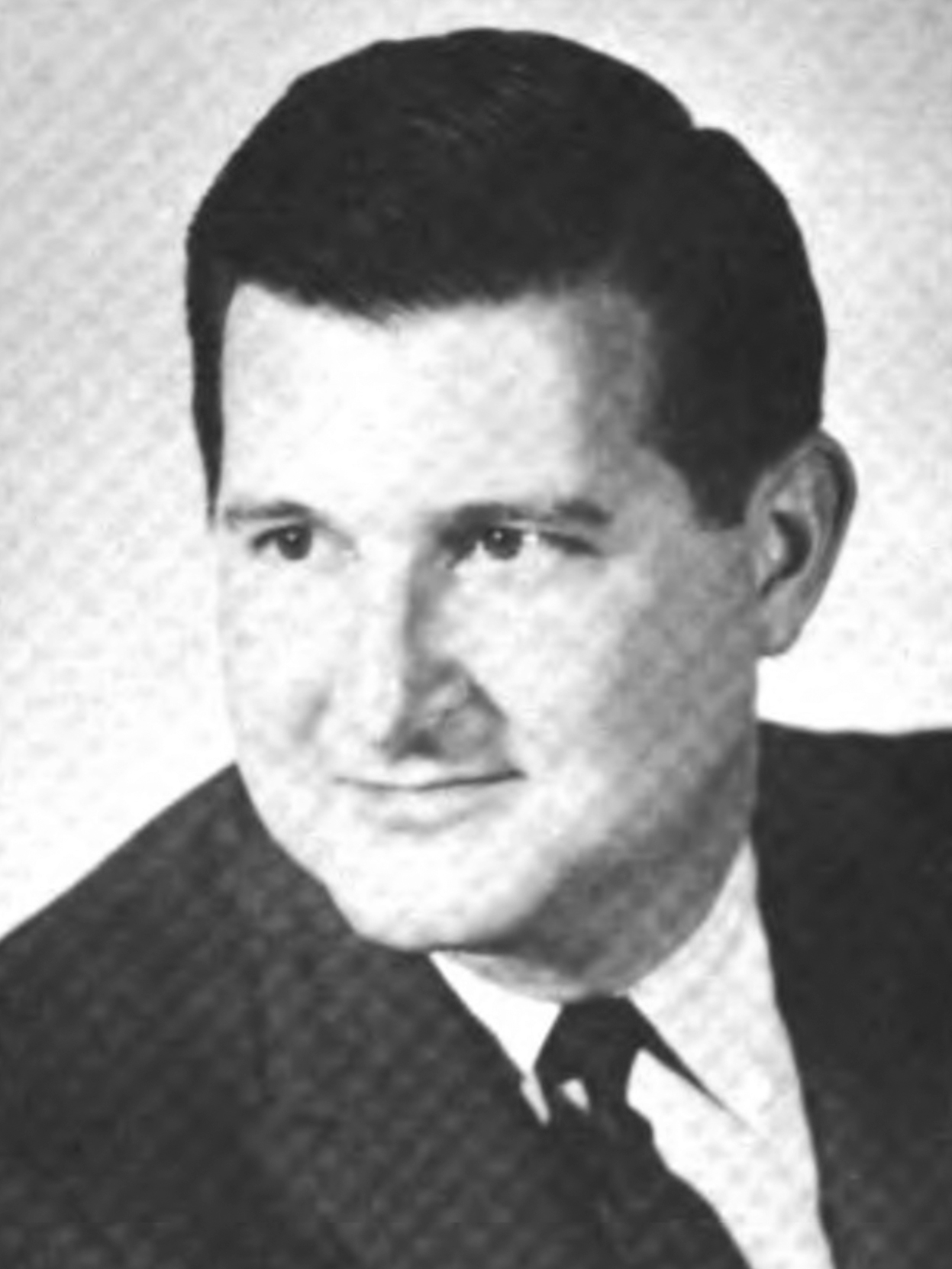
- Official portrait, 1975

Member of the California Senate from the 22nd district
- In office March 24, 1977 – November 30, 1982
- Preceded by: Anthony C. Beilenson
- Succeeded by: Herschel Rosenthal

Member of the California Assembly
- In office January 2, 1967 – March 24, 1977
- Preceded by: Anthony C. Beilenson
- Succeeded by: Mel Levine
- Constituency: 59th District (1967–1974); 44th District (1974–1977)

Personal details
- Born: Alan Gerald Sieroty; December 13, 1930 Los Angeles, California, U.S.
- Died: March 16, 2024 (aged 93) Los Angeles, California, U.S.
- Party: Democratic
- Education: Stanford University (AB); USC Gould School of Law (JD)

Alan Gerald Sieroty (December 13, 1930 – March 16, 2024) was an American politician and attorney who served as a member of both chambers of the California State Legislature.

== Early life and education ==
Born in Los Angeles, California, Sieroty was the son of retail store chain executive Julian M. Sieroty and the grandson of Adolph Sieroty, the downtown Los Angeles merchant who built the historic Eastern Columbia Building. His mother was Jean Sieroty, an immigrant from Poland who became a philanthropist and activist. He graduated from Beverly Hills High School in 1948, then received his A.B. in Economics in 1952 from Stanford University, where he was a member of Phi Beta Kappa society. He then received his LL.B. from USC Gould School of Law in 1956. Sieroty was Jewish.

== Career ==
From 1961 to 1965, he was Administrative Assistant and Executive Secretary to Lieutenant Governor Glenn M. Anderson. From 1965 to 1966, Sieroty was Deputy Director of the Chile-California Program.

A Democrat, Sieroty was a California State Assemblyman from 1967 until 1977, when he resigned just two months into his sixth term to become a California State Senator. He was re-elected in 1978 but did not seek re-election in 1982.

Sieroty was the author of more than 100 bills, many of which shaped key environmental policies. Among his most notable achievements was spearheading the initiative and legislative effort that established the California Coastal Commission, a landmark in coastal protection and environmental governance.

Sieroty was also the author of the bill which made the California Sabretooth Tiger (Smilodon californicus) the official state fossil. His fellow politicians in the Legislature named a Marin County beach for him, Alan Sieroty Beach.

Sieroty was Chairman of the Arts Task Force of the National Conference of State Legislatures and was also a member of the board of directors of the American Civil Liberties Union. In 1985, Sieroty became founding vice president of the California State Summer School for the Arts.

After leaving politics, Sieroty became part of his family's real estate enterprise headquartered in Los Angeles.

== Personal life and death ==
Sieroty was married to Shelli Chosak in 1982, and helped raise her three children. He died in Los Angeles on March 16, 2024, at the age of 93.

California Assembly
Preceded by Anthony C. Beilenson	California State Assemblyman; 59th District; January 2, 1967 – November 30, 1974	Succeeded by Jack R. Fenton
Preceded by Mike Cullen	California State Assemblyman; 44th District; December 2, 1974 – March 24, 1977	Succeeded by Mel Levine
California Senate
Preceded by Anthony C. Beilenson	California State Senator; 22nd District; March 24, 1977 – November 30, 1982	Succeeded by Herschel Rosenthal
