= Ed Hernandez =

American politician (born 1957)

Ed Hernández
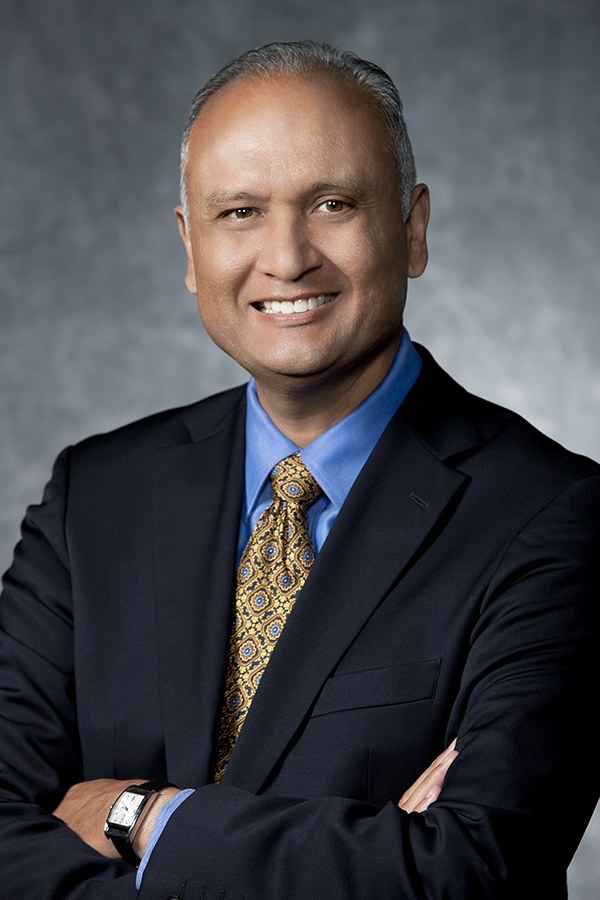
- Official portrait, 2012

Member of the California State Senate
- In office December 6, 2010 – November 30, 2018
- Preceded by: Gloria Romero
- Succeeded by: Susan Rubio
- Constituency: 24th district (2010–2014); 22nd district (2014–2018)

Member of the California State Assembly from the 57th district
- In office December 4, 2006 – November 30, 2010
- Preceded by: Ed Chavez
- Succeeded by: Roger Hernández

Personal details
- Born: Edward Paul Hernandez; October 17, 1957 (age 68) Montebello, California, U.S.
- Party: Democratic
- Spouse: Diane Hernández
- Children: 2
- Education: California State University, Fullerton (BS); Indiana University, Bloomington (OD)

Edward Paul Hernández (born October 17, 1957) is an American politician who previously served in the California State Senate. A Democrat, he represented the 24th Senate district from 2010 until he was redistricted to the 22nd Senate district, which he represented until 2018.

Before his election to the State Senate, he served in the California State Assembly, representing the 57th Assembly district from 2006 until 2010. Hernandez was a member of the California Latino Legislative Caucus.

Hernandez ran for Lieutenant Governor in 2018, eventually losing to U.S. Ambassador to Hungary Eleni Kounalakis.

== Early life and education ==
Hernández was born on October 17, 1957 in Montebello, California.

He attended California State University, Fullerton for a BS and Indiana University, Bloomington OD.

== Political career ==
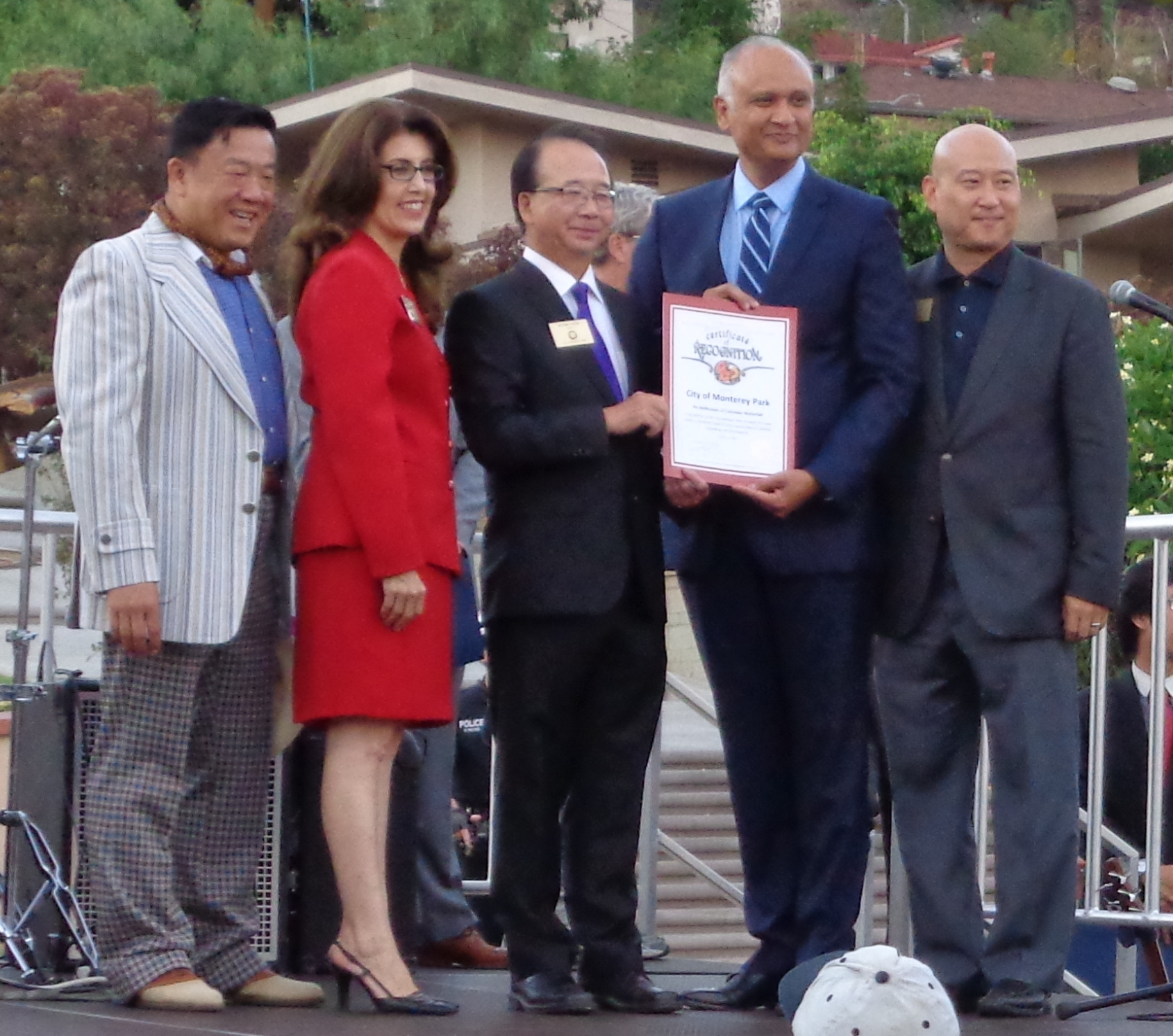
Hernandez with Monterey Park, California city officials in October 2015, from left to right: City Clerk Vincent Dionicio Chang, City Council Member Teresa Real Sebastian, Mayor Peter Chan, Hernández, City Council Member Hans Liang

=== Legislature elections ===
Hernández ran for the California State Assembly's 57th district in the 2006 elections, winning with 63% of the vote against Republican Holly Carver. In 2008, he was reelected with 66.3% against Republican challenger Victor Saldana.

In 2010, Hernández chose to not run for a third term in the Assembly and instead ran for the California Senate, to represent the 24th Senatorial district. He ran unopposed in the 2010 general election, succeeding former Majority Leader of the California Senate Gloria Romero. Following redistricting in 2014, he ran for the 22nd district in the 2014 elections, garnering 64.8% of the voteagainst Republican challenger Marc Rodriguez.

=== State Senate ===
Hernández chaired the Senate Health Committee between 2011 and 2017. He was the primary author for various laws affecting healthcare which were passed and codified in the California Health and Safety Code. An optometrist, he served as the Chair of the Senate Committee on Health.

He was also involved in implementing the federal Patient Protection and Affordable Care Act.

In 2012, Hernández authored and introduced Senate Constitutional Amendment No.5 (SCA5), which would have asked voters to consider eliminating California Proposition 209's ban on the use of race, sex, color, ethnicity, or national origin in recruitment, admissions, and retention programs at California's public universities and colleges. It was passed in the California Senate on Jan. 30, 2014. Opponents of Proposition 209 say that the proposition has resulted in low minority enrollment in the state's public colleges and to have been driven by racial divisions. However, following resistance from various citizen groups, including Asian American groups, Senator Hernandez withdrew his measure from consideration.

=== 2018 Lieutenant Governor election ===
In 2016, Hernández announced that he would run to replace Gavin Newsom as lieutenant governor in 2018. Hernandez was term-limited from running in the State Senate in the 2018 Senate elections, as he was elected prior to the extension of term limits enacted in 2012.

In the blanket primary, Hernández won 20.6% of the vote, coming in second to former U.S. Ambassador to Hungary Eleni Kounalakis. He only carried a majority of two counties: Imperial County and Los Angeles County.

In the general election, Hernández was defeated by Eleni Kounalakis, after he won 43.45% of the vote. He only carried five counties in the state: Glenn, Kings, Madera, Merced, and Imperial counties.

California Assembly
Preceded by Ed Chavez	Member of the California Assembly from the 57th district 2006–2010	Succeeded by Roger Hernández
California Senate
Preceded by Gloria Romero	Member of the California Senate from the 24th district 2010–2014	Succeeded by Kevin de León
Preceded by Kevin de León	Member of the California Senate from the 22nd district 2014–2018	Succeeded by Susan Rubio
