= Gloria Romero (politician) =

American politician

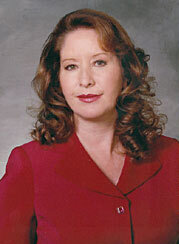
- Official portrait, c. 2001–2010

Majority Leader of the California Senate
- In office 2005–2008
- Preceded by: Don Perata
- Succeeded by: Dean Florez

Member of the California State Senate from the 24th district
- In office March 12, 2001 – November 30, 2010
- Preceded by: Hilda Solis
- Succeeded by: Edward Hernández

Member of the California State Assembly from the 49th district
- In office December 7, 1998 – March 12, 2001
- Preceded by: Diane Martinez
- Succeeded by: Judy Chu

Personal details
- Born: July 10, 1955 (age 71) Barstow, California, U.S.
- Party: Democratic (before 2024); Republican (2024–present)
- Children: 1
- Education: Barstow Community College (AA); California State University, Long Beach (BA, MA); University of California, Riverside (PhD)
- Website: Campaign website

Gloria J. Romero (born July 10, 1955) is an American politician. She served as a California state senator from 2001 until 2010 and was the Democratic majority leader of the California State Senate from 2005 until 2008. She was the first woman to hold that leadership position. In 2024, she joined the Republican Party.

== Early life and career ==
Romero grew up in Barstow, one of six children. Her father worked in the railroad yards and her mother, who left school after sixth grade, stayed home and raised the children. Romero received her associate's degree from Barstow Community College before going on to earn a B.A. and an M.A. from California State University, Long Beach and a Ph.D. in psychology from the University of California, Riverside.

She taught as a professor at state universities and served as a trustee and vice president of the board of trustees of Los Angeles Community College District.

== Legislative career ==
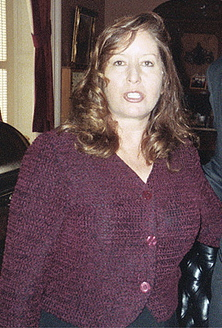
Romero in 2006

Romero was elected to the California State Assembly in 1998 and to the Senate in 2001. Romero represented the 24th district, which included East Los Angeles, portions of the city of Los Angeles, as well as a major part of the San Gabriel Valley, including the cities of Azusa, Baldwin Park, Covina, Duarte, El Monte, City of Industry, Irwindale, La Puente, Monterey Park, Rosemead, West Covina and Whittier.

In 2008, Romero stepped down as Majority Leader and became chairman of the Education Committee. In that position, she authored and guided to passage a fiercely contested "parent trigger" law that allows a majority of parents in a "failing school" to vote on a method to restructure the school.

Romero was term-limited in 2010.

== Post-legislative career ==
=== Campaign for State Superintendent of Public Instruction ===
Following U.S. Representative Hilda Solis's December 2008 selection to become U.S. Secretary of Labor by President-elect Barack Obama (and expected subsequent confirmation), Romero indicated strong interest in running in the special election for California's 32nd congressional district to replace her, but later chose to run for the nonpartisan California State Superintendent of Public Instruction instead. Romero was supported by advocates of charter schools, while her two major opponents were supported by teachers unions and school administrators, respectively. Eventually, Romero finished third, receiving 17.0% of the vote in a crowded 12-person field.

=== Advocacy ===
Romero led the California chapter of Democrats for Education Reform, a reform wing of the Democratic Party supporting charter schools. In the 2012 election, she supported California's Proposition 32, which would have barred payroll deductions to give money to unions Political Action Committees (PACs). She founded Scholarship Prep Charter School, which enrolls TK-8th grade students in low income communities.

In the unsuccessful 2021 California gubernatorial recall election, she endorsed Republican Larry Elder as a replacement candidate for Democratic governor Gavin Newsom, while saying that she "disagrees with just about everything that Larry Elder stands for".

On September 4, 2024, Romero left the Democratic Party and joined the Republican Party. She gave many reasons for her switch in parties, including her disagreement with the Democratic Party's positions on crime, gender identity, COVID-19 lockdowns, gas stoves and school choice. In a press conference, Romero endorsed Donald Trump in the 2024 election and offered praise for Robert F. Kennedy Jr., calling him a "personal hero".

=== 2026 California lieutenant gubernatorial campaign ===
On February 3, 2025, Politico's California Playbook reported that Romero was considering running in the 2026 California lieutenant gubernatorial election. She announced her campaign in January 2026, as part of a slate with Steve Hilton.

Romero secured her spot on the November ballot by finishing one of the top two candidates in the primary with roughly 18% of the vote. She will face incumbent state treasurer Fiona Ma, in the general election.

California Senate
Preceded by Don Perata	Majority Leader of the California State Senate; 2005–2008	Succeeded by Dean Florez
Party political offices
Preceded by Angela Underwood Jacobs	Republican nominee for Lieutenant Governor of California; 2026	Most recent
