= David Bush =

David Bush may refer to:

- David Bush (diver) (born 1951), American Olympic diver
- David F. Bush (1895–1975), member of the California legislature
- Dave Bush (born 1979), American baseball pitcher
