= 2010 California State Senate election =

- November 2, 2010

20 seats from even-numbered districts in the California State Senate 21 seats needed for a majority
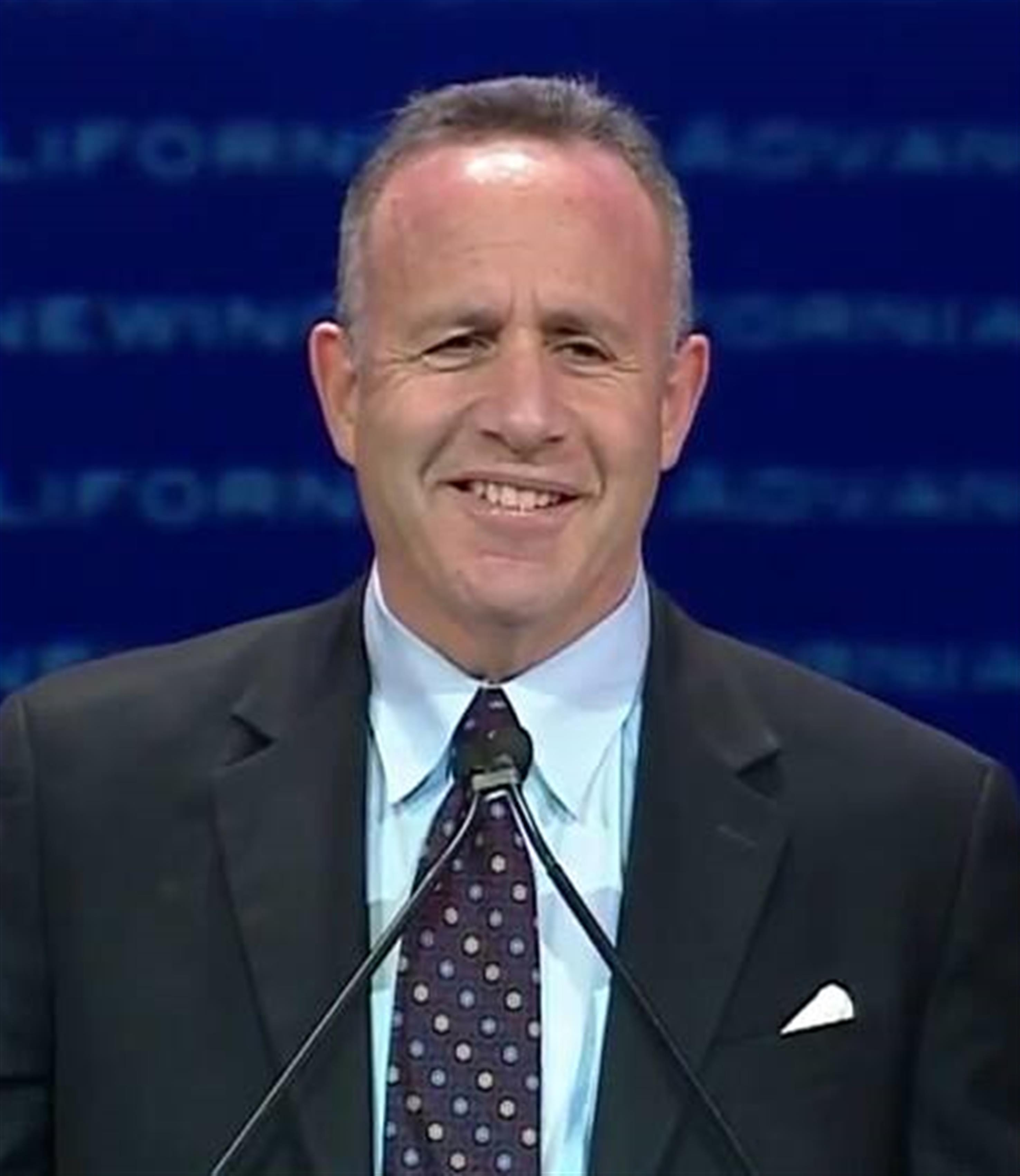

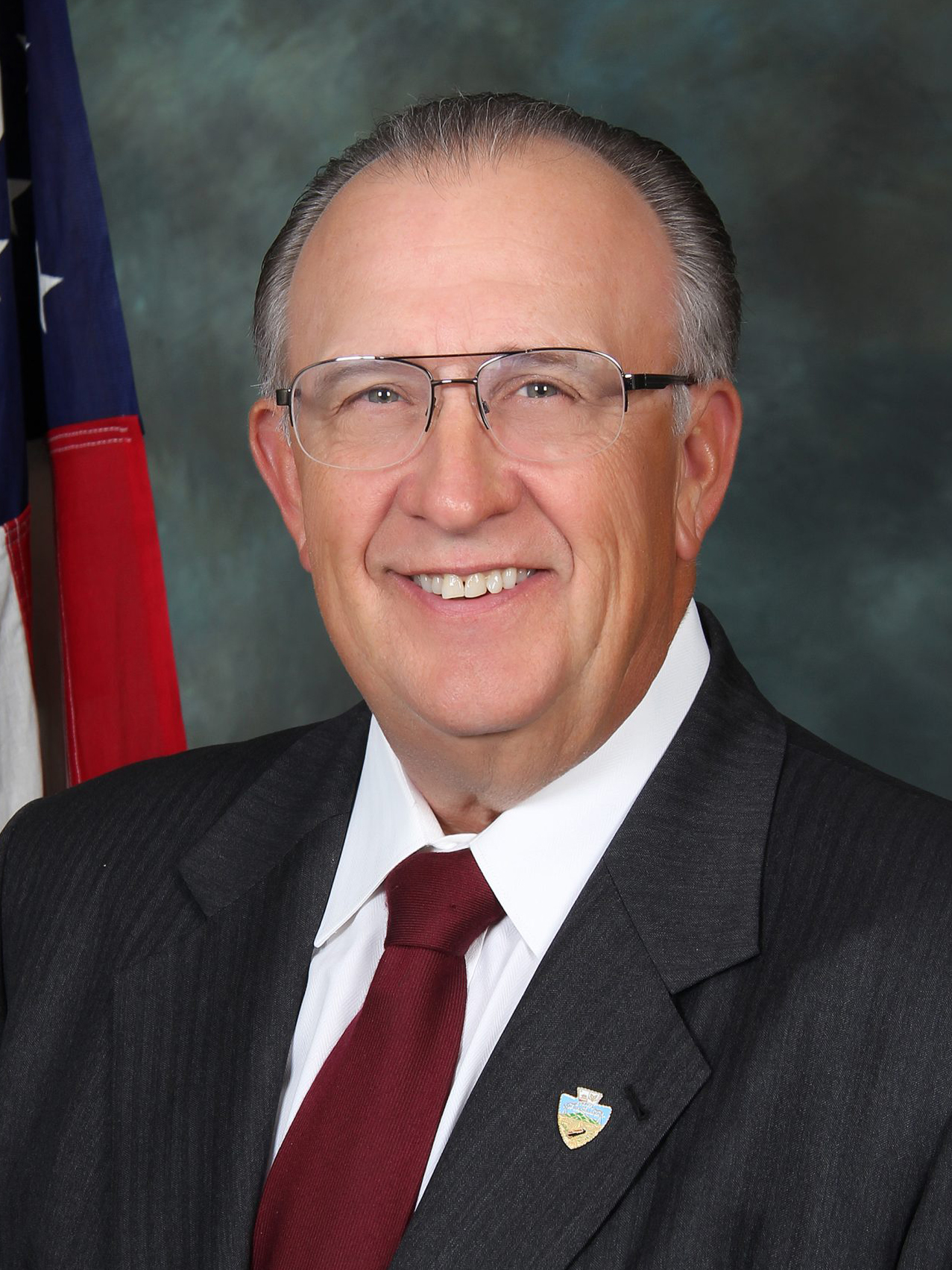
	Majority party	Minority party
Leader	Darrell Steinberg	Robert Dutton
Party	Democratic	Republican
Leader's seat	6th–Sacramento	31st–Rancho Cucamonga
Seats before	25	15
Seats after	25	15
Seat change	Steady	Steady
Popular vote	2,279,834	1,736,816
Percentage	55.57%	42.33%
- Results: Democratic hold Republican hold No election held
President pro tempore before election
Darrell Steinberg
Democratic
President pro tempore-designate
Darrell Steinberg
Democratic

The 2010 California State Senate elections were held on November 2, 2010. Voters in the 20 even-numbered districts of the California State Senate voted for their representatives. Other elections were also held on November 2. No seats changed parties in this election.

== Overview ==
California State Senate elections, 2010
Party	Votes	Percentage	Not up	Contested	Before	After	+/–
Democratic	2,279,834	55.57%	11	14	25	25	Steady
Republican	1,736,816	42.33%	9	6	15	15	Steady
Libertarian	64,164	1.56%	0	0	0	0	Steady
American Independent	11,871	0.29%	0	0	0	0	Steady
Peace and Freedom	10,209	0.25%	0	0	0	0	Steady
Independent	10	0.00%	0	0	0	0	Steady
Totals	4,102,904	100.00%	20	20	40	40	—

== Predictions ==
Source	Ranking	As of
Governing	Safe D	November 1, 2010

== Results ==
The following results were reported:

=== District 2 ===
California's 2nd State Senate district election, 2010
Party	Candidate	Votes	%
Democratic	Noreen Evans	190,824	63.4
Republican	Lawrence R. Wiesner	110,209	36.6
Independent	Ed Musgrave (write-in)	10	0.0
Total votes		301,043	100.0
Democratic hold			

=== District 4 ===
California's 4th State Senate district election, 2010
Party	Candidate	Votes	%
Republican	Doug LaMalfa	226,239	68.3
Democratic	Lathe Gill	105,460	31.7
Total votes		331,699	100.0
Republican hold			

=== District 6 ===
California's 6th State Senate district election, 2010
Party	Candidate	Votes	%
Democratic	Darrell Steinberg (incumbent)	137,012	61.0
Republican	Marcel Weiland	70,724	31.5
Libertarian	Steve Torno	11,236	4.9
Peace and Freedom	Lanric Hyland	5,916	2.6
Total votes		224,888	100.0
Democratic hold			

=== District 8 ===
California's 8th State Senate district election, 2010
Party	Candidate	Votes	%
Democratic	Leland Yee (incumbent)	197,070	79.0
Republican	Doo Sup Park	52,587	21.0
Total votes		249,657	100.0
Democratic hold			

=== District 10 ===
California's 10th State Senate district election, 2010
Party	Candidate	Votes	%
Democratic	Ellen Corbett (incumbent)	139,799	66.6
Republican	Rob Maffit	58,262	27.8
American Independent	Ivan Chou	11,871	5.6
Total votes		209,932	100.0
Democratic hold			

=== District 12 ===
California's 12th State Senate district election, 2010
Party	Candidate	Votes	%
Republican	Anthony Cannella	92,270	51.5
Democratic	Anna Caballero	86,923	48.5
Total votes		179,193	100.0
Republican hold			

=== District 14 ===
California's 14th State Senate district election, 2010
Party	Candidate	Votes	%
Republican	Tom Berryhill	191,097	66.4
Democratic	Larry Johnson	96,835	33.6
Total votes		287,932	100.0
Republican hold			

=== District 16 ===
California's 16th State Senate district election, 2010
Party	Candidate	Votes	%
Democratic	Michael Rubio	71,334	60.5
Republican	Tim Thiesen	46,717	39.5
Total votes		118,051	100.0
Democratic hold			

=== District 18 ===
California's 18th State Senate district election, 2010
Party	Candidate	Votes	%
Republican	Jean Fuller	166,051	68.9
Democratic	Carter N. Pope	75,229	31.1
Total votes		241,280	100.0
Republican hold			

=== District 20 ===
California's 20th State Senate district election, 2010
Party	Candidate	Votes	%
Democratic	Alex Padilla (incumbent)	94,356	68.4
Republican	Kathleen "Suzy" Evans	37,420	27.1
Libertarian	Adrian Galysh	6,245	4.5
Total votes		138,051	100.0
Democratic hold			

=== District 22 ===
California's 22nd State Senate district election, 2010
Party	Candidate	Votes	%
Democratic	Kevin de León	90,557	100.0
Total votes		90,557	100.0
Democratic hold			

=== District 24 ===
California's 24th State Senate district election, 2010
Party	Candidate	Votes	%
Democratic	Ed Hernandez	112,792	100.0
Republican	William Rodriguez Morrison (write-in)	22	0.0
Total votes		112,814	100.0
Democratic hold			

=== District 26 ===
California's 26th State Senate district election, 2010
Party	Candidate	Votes	%
Democratic	Curren Price (incumbent)	151,733	81.3
Republican	Nachum Shifren	25,728	13.8
Libertarian	Bob Weber	4,882	2.6
Peace and Freedom	Cindy Varela Henderson	4,293	2.3
Total votes		186,636	100.0
Democratic hold			

=== District 28 ===
Incumbent Jenny Oropeza died on October 20, 2010, from complications from a blood clot, and remained on the ballot. A special election was called after she posthumously won the election.

California's 28th State Senate district election, 2010
Party	Candidate	Votes	%
Democratic	Jenny Oropeza (incumbent)	142,578	58.2
Republican	John S. Stammreich	87,896	35.8
Libertarian	David Ruskin	14,879	6.0
Total votes		245,353	100.0
Democratic hold			

=== District 30 ===
California's 30th State Senate district election, 2010
Party	Candidate	Votes	%
Democratic	Ronald Calderon (incumbent)	105,946	68.6
Republican	Warren P. Willis	48,534	31.4
Total votes		154,480	100.0
Democratic hold			

=== District 32 ===
California's 32nd State Senate district election, 2010
Party	Candidate	Votes	%
Democratic	Gloria Negrete McLeod (incumbent)	92,691	67.9
Republican	Earl De Vries	43,924	32.1
Total votes		136,615	100.0
Democratic hold			

=== District 34 ===
California's 34th State Senate district election, 2010
Party	Candidate	Votes	%
Democratic	Lou Correa (incumbent)	88,892	65.8
Republican	Lucille Kring	46,377	34.2
Total votes		135,269	100.0
Democratic hold			

=== District 36 ===
California's 36th State Senate district election, 2010
Party	Candidate	Votes	%
Republican	Joel Anderson	193,573	63.2
Democratic	Paul Clay	101,112	33.0
Libertarian	Michael S. Metti	11,737	3.8
Total votes		306,422	100.0
Republican hold			

=== District 38 ===
California's 38th State Senate district election, 2010
Party	Candidate	Votes	%
Republican	Mark Wyland (incumbent)	169,769	60.2
Democratic	Gila Jones	96,884	34.4
Libertarian	Kristi Stone	15,185	5.4
Total votes		281,838	100.0
Republican hold			

=== District 40 ===
California's 40th State Senate district election, 2010
Party	Candidate	Votes	%
Democratic	Juan Vargas	101,767	59.5
Republican	Brian Hendry	69,417	40.5
Total votes		171,184	100.0
Democratic hold			
