= California's 22nd senatorial district =

American legislative district

California's 22nd State Senate district
Current senator
Susan Rubio; D–Baldwin Park
- Population (2010) • Voting age • Citizen voting age: 929,298; 698,855; 515,067
- Demographics: 12.16% White; 1.56% Black; 53.44% Latino; 31.97% Asian; 0.25% Native American; 0.10% Hawaiian/Pacific Islander; 0.16% other; 0.35% remainder of multiracial
- Registered voters: 459,489
- Registration: 48.00% Democratic; 17.48% Republican; 29.12% No party preference

California's 22nd senatorial district is one of 40 California State Senate districts. It is currently represented by Democrat Susan Rubio of Baldwin Park.

== District profile ==
The district encompasses eastern San Gabriel Valley and the Pomona Valley in Los Angeles County, including El Monte, West Covina, Covina, Duarte, Baldwin Park, Irwindale, Vincent, Azusa, San Dimas, La Verne, and Pomona; as well as Montclair, Chino, and Ontario in the southwestern corner of San Bernardino County.

== Election results from statewide races ==
Year	Office	Results
2022	Governor	Newsom 56.9 - 43.1%
2022	Senator	Padilla 59.7 - 40.3%
2021	Recall	No 66.7 – 33.3%
2020	President	Biden 67.4 – 30.7%
2018	Governor	Newsom 68.2 – 31.8%
2018	Senator	Feinstein 55.5 – 44.5%
2016	President	Clinton 69.9 – 24.6%
2016	Senator	Harris 51.8 – 48.2%
2014	Governor	Brown 64.6 – 35.4%
2012	President	Obama 68.3 – 29.4%
2012	Senator	Feinstein 70.3 – 29.7%

== List of senators representing the district ==
Due to redistricting, the 73rd district has been moved around different parts of the state. The current iteration resulted from the 2021 redistricting by the California Citizens Redistricting Commission.

Senators	Party	Years served	Electoral history	Counties represented
Francis Anderson (Downieville)	Union	January 6, 1862 – December 6, 1863	Elected in 1862. [data missing]	Sierra
J. W. Moyle (Howland Flat)	Union	December 6, 1863 – December 4, 1865	Elected in 1863. [data missing]	Sierra
Leonidas E. Pratt (Downieville)	Union	December 4, 1865 – December 6, 1869	Elected in 1865. [data missing]	Sierra
Henry K. Turner (Sierraville)	Republican	December 6, 1869 – December 3, 1877	Elected in 1868. Re-elected in 1873. [data missing]	Sierra
Henry K. Turner (Sierraville)	Republican	December 6, 1869 – December 3, 1877	Elected in 1868. Re-elected in 1873. [data missing]	Nevada, Sierra
[data missing]		December 3, 1877 – January 5, 1880	[data missing]	Nevada, Sierra
Samuel B. Burt (Bath)	Republican	January 5, 1880 – January 8, 1883	Elected in 1879. [data missing]	Placer
Joseph A. Filcher (Placer)	Democratic	January 8, 1883 – January 3, 1887	Elected in 1882. [data missing]	Placer
J. N. E. Wilson (San Francisco)	Republican	January 3, 1887 – January 5, 1891	Elected in 1886. [data missing]	San Francisco
Daniel H. Everett (San Francisco)	Republican	January 5, 1891 – January 7, 1895	Elected in 1890. [data missing]	San Francisco
Percy L. Henderson (San Francisco)	Democratic	January 7, 1895 – January 2, 1899	Elected in 1894. [data missing]	San Francisco
Sigmund M. Bettman (San Francisco)	Republican	January 2, 1899 – January 5, 1903	Elected in 1888. [data missing]	San Francisco
Hamilton A. Bauer (San Francisco)	Republican	January 5, 1903 – January 7, 1907	Elected in 1902. [data missing]	San Francisco
Gus Hartman (San Francisco)	Republican	January 7, 1907 – January 2, 1911	Elected in 1906. [data missing]	San Francisco
John J. Cassidy (San Francisco)	Republican	January 2, 1911 – January 4, 1915	Elected in 1910. [data missing]	San Francisco
J. J. Crowley (San Francisco)	Progressive	January 4, 1915 – January 5, 1931	Elected in 1914. Re-elected in 1918. Re-elected in 1922. Re-elected in 1926. [data missing]	San Francisco
J. J. Crowley (San Francisco)	Republican	January 4, 1915 – January 5, 1931	Elected in 1914. Re-elected in 1918. Re-elected in 1922. Re-elected in 1926. [data missing]	San Francisco
David F. Bush (Oakdale)	Republican	January 5, 1931 – January 7, 1935	Elected in 1930. [data missing]	Stanislaus
J. C. Garrison (Modesto)	Republican	January 7, 1935 – January 4, 1943	Elected in 1934. Re-elected in 1938. [data missing]	Stanislaus
Hugh P. Donnelly (Turlock)	Democratic	January 4, 1943 – January 2, 1967	Elected in 1942. Re-elected in 1946. Re-elected in 1950. Re-elected in 1954. Re-elected in 1958. Re-elected in 1962. [data missing]	Stanislaus
Tom C. Carrell (Los Angeles)	Democratic	January 2, 1967 – October 15, 1972	Elected in 1966. Re-elected in 1970. Died.	Los Angeles
Vacant		October 15, 1972 – March 2, 1973		Los Angeles
Alan Robbins (Los Angeles)	Democratic	March 2, 1973 – November 30, 1974	Elected to finish Carrell's term. Redistricted to the 20th district.	Los Angeles
Anthony Beilenson (Los Angeles)	Democratic	December 2, 1974 – January 3, 1977	Redistricted from the 26h district and re-elected in 1974. Resigned when elected to the U.S. House of Representatives.	Los Angeles
Vacant		January 3, 1977 – March 24, 1977		Los Angeles
Alan Sieroty (Los Angeles)	Democratic	March 24, 1977 – November 30, 1982	Elected to finish Beilenson's term.	Los Angeles
Herschel Rosenthal (Los Angeles)	Democratic	December 6, 1982 – November 30, 1994	Elected in 1982. Re-elected in 1986. Re-elected in 1990. Redistricted to the 20th district.	Los Angeles
Richard Polanco (East Los Angeles)	Democratic	December 5, 1994 – November 30, 2002	Elected in 1994. Re-elected in 1998. Retired due to term limits.	Los Angeles
Gil Cedillo (Los Angeles)	Democratic	December 2, 2002 – November 30, 2010	Elected in 2002. Re-elected in 2006. Retired to run for State Assembly.	Los Angeles
Kevin de León (Los Angeles)	Democratic	December 6, 2010 – November 30, 2014	Elected in 2010. Redistricted to the 24th district.	Los Angeles
Ed Hernandez (Azuza)	Democratic	December 1, 2014 – November 30, 2018	Redistricted from the 24th district and re-elected in 2014. Retired due to term limits and ran for lieutenant governor.	Los Angeles
Susan Rubio (Baldwin Park)	Democratic	December 3, 2018 – present	Elected in 2018. Re-elected in 2022.	Los Angeles

== Election results (1990-present) ==
=== 2022 ===
2022 California State Senate 22nd district election
Primary election
Party	Candidate	Votes	%
Democratic	Susan Rubio (incumbent)	63,394	59.7
Republican	Vincent Tsai	28,262	26.6
Republican	Kimo Mateo	14,479	13.6
Total votes		106,135	100.0
General election
Democratic	Susan Rubio (incumbent)	110,327	58.5
Republican	Vincent Tsai	78,156	41.5
Total votes		188,483	100.0
Democratic hold			

=== 2018 ===
2018 California State Senate 22nd district election
Primary election
Party	Candidate	Votes	%
Democratic	Mike Eng	38,051	45.3
Democratic	Susan Rubio	22,136	26.4
Democratic	Monica Garcia	17,404	20.7
Democratic	Ruben Sierra	6,377	7.6
Total votes		83,968	100.0
General election
Democratic	Susan Rubio	101,936	52.3
Democratic	Mike Eng	93,018	47.7
Total votes		194,954	100.0
Democratic hold			

=== 2014 ===
2014 California State Senate 22nd district election
Primary election
Party	Candidate	Votes	%
Democratic	Ed Hernandez (incumbent)	34,375	99.6
Republican	Marc Rodriguez (write-in)	154	0.4
Total votes		34,529	100.0
General election
Democratic	Ed Hernandez (incumbent)	63,570	64.8
Republican	Marc Rodriguez	34,468	35.2
Total votes		98,038	100.0
Democratic hold			

=== 2010 ===
2010 California State Senate 22nd district election
Party	Candidate	Votes	%
Democratic	Kevin de León	90,557	100.0
Total votes		90,557	100.0
Democratic hold			

=== 2006 ===
2006 California State Senate 22nd district election
Party	Candidate	Votes	%
Democratic	Gilbert Cedillo (incumbent)	71,199	76.4
Republican	Mike Ten	18,581	19.9
Libertarian	Murray Levy	3,469	3.7
Total votes		93,249	100.0
Democratic hold			

=== 2002 ===
2002 California State Senate 22nd district election
Party	Candidate	Votes	%
Democratic	Gilbert Cedillo	68,282	100.0
Total votes		68,282	100.0
Democratic hold			

=== 1998 ===
1998 California State Senate 22nd district election
Party	Candidate	Votes	%
Democratic	Richard G. Polanco (incumbent)	65,104	89.5
Peace and Freedom	Marian 'Muffy' Sunde	7,665	10.5
Total votes		72,769	100.0
Democratic hold			

=== 1994 ===
1994 California State Senate 22nd district election
Party	Candidate	Votes	%
Democratic	Richard Polanco	46,613	68.0
Republican	Yong Tai Lee	15,847	23.1
Peace and Freedom	Pearl Wolff	3,845	5.6
Libertarian	Vincent Way	2,217	3.2
Total votes		68,522	100.0
Democratic hold			

=== 1990 ===
1990 California State Senate 22nd district election
Party	Candidate	Votes	%
Democratic	Herschel Rosenthal (incumbent)	129,939	64.6
Republican	Michael Schrager	62,193	30.9
Peace and Freedom	Margery Hinds	8,969	4.5
Total votes		201,101	100.0
Democratic hold			

== See also ==
- California State Senate
- California State Senate districts
- Districts in California
