= Susan Rubio =

American politician (born 1970)

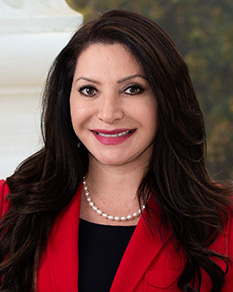

Member of the California Senate from the 22nd district
- Incumbent
- Assumed office December 3, 2018
- Preceded by: Ed Hernandez

Personal details
- Born: December 25, 1970 (age 55) Ciudad Juárez, Mexico
- Party: Democratic
- Spouse: Roger Hernández (m. 2013; div. 2016)
- Relatives: Blanca Rubio (sister)
- Education: East Los Angeles College; Azusa Pacific University (BA, MA)
- Website: Campaign website

Susan Rubio (born December 25, 1970) is an American politician serving in the California State Senate. She represents the 22nd Senate District in eastern Los Angeles County and is a member of the Democratic Party. Prior to being elected to the California Legislature in 2018, she was an elected official for the City of Baldwin Park for 13 years and a public school teacher for 17 years.

She is the first Latinx chair of the State Senate Insurance Committee, Chair of the Senate Select Committee on Domestic Violence, and Senate Assistant Majority Whip.

== Early life and education ==
Rubio was born in Ciudad Juárez, Chihuahua, Mexico. Rubio's parents twice immigrated to the United States without proper documentation. The first time the family settled in Texas, from which they were deported in 1975, after about two years. The family returned to the US two years later in 1977, again as illegal immigrants, this time settling in Los Angeles. She became a U.S. citizen in 1994 after being sponsored by her youngest sister, Sylvia, who was born in El Paso. She has Jewish ancestry.

Rubio attended East Los Angeles College (ELAC) and earned an undergraduate degree and a master's degree in Education from Azusa Pacific University.

== Earlier career ==
Rubio started her teaching career in Baldwin Park Unified School District and was a teacher at Monrovia Unified School District for 17 years. Rubio was first elected as City Clerk in Baldwin Park in 2005. In 2009, she was elected to the Baldwin Park City Council and reelected in 2013.

== California State Senate ==
Rubio represents the 22nd Senate district in eastern Los Angeles County. In 2018, she finished in second place over Baldwin Park City Councilwoman Monica Garcia in the primary, then won November runoff against former state Assemblyman Mike Eng.

Her district comprises the cities of Alhambra, Arcadia, Azusa, Baldwin Park, Covina, El Monte, Industry, Irwindale, La Puente, Monterey Park, San Gabriel, Rosemead, South El Monte, Temple City and West Covina as well as the unincorporated communities of Avocado Heights, Charter Oak, Citrus, East Pasadena, East San Gabriel, Mayflower Village, North El Monte, South Monrovia Island, South San Gabriel, South San Jose Hills, Valinda, Vincent and West Puente Valley.

She is Chair of the Senate Insurance Committee and committee member of Energy, Utilities, Communications; Health; Transportation; and Governmental Organization. She is a member of the Senate Housing Group and was recently appointed as Senate Assistant Majority Whip.

She is Chair of the Senate Select Committee on Domestic Violence and Co-Chair of the Wildfire Working group. She is also a Select Committee member of The Social Determinants of Children’s Well-Being; Asian Pacific Islander Affairs; Mental Health; California-Mexico Cooperation; and California, Armenia and Artsakh Mutual Trade, Art and Cultural Exchange.

Rubio is a Member of the Latino Legislative Caucus, Legislative Jewish Caucus, Los Angeles Caucus, San Gabriel Valley Caucus and Legislative Women’s Caucus.

=== Domestic violence legislation ===
In February 2019, Rubio introduced SB 273, The Phoenix Act, a bill intended to help victims of domestic violence by lengthening the statute of limitations from 3 to 5 years in certain cases and requiring additional police training on dealing with such cases. It was signed into law. She also passed SB 316, which requires the number of the National Domestic Violence Hotline to be printed on the back of student ID cards.

In 2020, she passed SB 1141, which allows domestic violence victims to use evidence of psychologically damaging or abusive behavior, commonly referred to as coercive control, as evidence in Family Court or criminal proceedings.

== Corruption investigation ==
In December 2024, a plea agreement was unsealed which revealed that somebody fitting Rubio's description was part of a cannabis-involved corruption investigation in 2018. Although she denied wrongdoing and was not specifically named, the Los Angeles Times reported that Rubio is the only person that fit the description of the person involved, namely "someone who was in a position to terminate the Baldwin Park city attorney in 2017 and 2018, and was running for state office through November of 2018" (Rubio was a Baldwin Park city councilor at the time, and had defeated a fellow councilor in the primary, making her the only person on the Baldwin Park city council to be running through November). Assemblyman Bill Essayli has called for an ethics investigation against Rubio, which was sent to the speakers of both the California Assembly and Senate.

== Electoral history ==
2018 California State Senate 22nd district election
Primary election
Party	Candidate	Votes	%
Democratic	Mike Eng	38,051	45.3
Democratic	Susan Rubio	22,136	26.4
Democratic	Monica Garcia	17,404	20.7
Democratic	Ruben Sierra	6,377	7.6
Total votes		83,968	100.0
General election
Democratic	Susan Rubio	101,936	52.3
Democratic	Mike Eng	93,018	47.7
Total votes		194,954	100.0
Democratic hold			

2022 California State Senate 22nd district election
Primary election
Party	Candidate	Votes	%
Democratic	Susan Rubio (incumbent)	63,394	59.7
Republican	Vincent Tsai	28,262	26.6
Republican	Kimo Mateo	14,479	13.6
Total votes		106,135	100.0
General election
Democratic	Susan Rubio (incumbent)	110,327	58.5
Republican	Vincent Tsai	78,156	41.5
Total votes		188,483	100.0
Democratic hold			

== Personal life ==
Her ex-husband is former Assemblyman Roger Hernández, whom she divorced in 2016 after winning a restraining order due to allegations of several domestic violence incidents during their marriage, including "pushing, shoving, and choking" her. Her sister is California State Assemblywoman Blanca Rubio.

Rubio is a registered voter in Baldwin Park and lives in Sacramento where she owns property.
