= 2012 California Proposition 28 =

Referendum changing state legislature term limits

Proposition 28
- June 5, 2012
- Changing legislature term limits

Results
Choice	Votes	%
Yes	3,081,174	61.02%
No	1,967,888	38.98%
Total votes	5,049,062	100.00%
County results
For
60–70%
50–60%

Proposition 28 is a California ballot measure that was approved by California voters at the statewide election on June 5, 2012. It was an initiative constitutional amendment to change California state legislature term limits from a limit of 8 years for the Senate and 6 years for the Assembly, to a limit of 12 years on combined service. It affects only legislators first elected to the Assembly or Senate after the proposition passed.

== Results ==
Results by county.

Limits on Legislators' Terms in Office
Choice	Votes	%
For	3,081,174	61.02
Against	1,967,888	38.98
Total	5,049,062	100.00
Registered voters/turnout	23,713,027	21.3

== See also ==
- 2008 California Proposition 93, a failed proposition that proposed a similar change
