= California's 20th senatorial district =

American legislative district

California's 20th State Senate district
Current senator
Caroline Menjivar; D–Los Angeles
- Population (2010) • Voting age • Citizen voting age: 935,935; 645,309; 465,480
- Demographics: 15.74% White; 8.45% Black; 68.41% Latino; 6.02% Asian; 0.40% Native American; 0.28% Hawaiian/Pacific Islander; 0.24% other; 0.45% remainder of multiracial
- Registered voters: 441,629
- Registration: 49.31% Democratic; 19.77% Republican; 24.58% No party preference

California's 20th senatorial district is one of 40 California State Senate districts. It is currently represented by Democrat Caroline Menjivar of Los Angeles.

== District profile ==
The district encompasses most of the San Fernando Valley section of northern Los Angeles, including Burbank, Van Nuys, Reseda, Canoga Park, Tujunga, Sun Valley, Shadow Hills, Lake View Terrace, Arleta, Panorama City, Pacoima, Mission Hills, San Fernando, and Sylmar.

== Election results from statewide races ==
Year	Office	Results
2021	Recall	No 64.8 – 35.2%
2020	President	Biden 65.2 – 32.5%
2018	Governor	Newsom 65.7 – 34.3%
2018	Senator	Feinstein 52.9 – 47.1%
2016	President	Clinton 67.9 – 26.8%
2016	Senator	Harris 50.6 – 49.4%
2014	Governor	Brown 61.7 – 38.3%
2012	President	Obama 68.2 – 29.8%
2012	Senator	Feinstein 68.8 – 31.2%

== List of senators representing the district ==
Due to redistricting, the 20th district has been moved around different parts of the state. The current iteration resulted from the 2021 redistricting by the California Citizens Redistricting Commission.

=== 1851–1861: one seat ===
Senators	Party	Years served	Electoral history	Counties represented
District established April 16, 1852
James M. Estill	Democratic	April 16, 1852 – May 15, 1854	Elected in 1851. Re-elected in 1852. [data missing]	Sierra
John D. Scellan	Whig	January 1, 1855 – April 21, 1856	Elected in 1854. [data missing]	Sierra
William T. Ferguson	Know Nothing	January 5, 1857 – April 26, 1858	Elected in 1856. Re-elected in 1857. [data missing]	Sierra
William T. Ferguson	Democratic	January 5, 1857 – April 26, 1858	Elected in 1856. Re-elected in 1857. [data missing]	Sierra
M. Kirkpatrick	Democratic	January 3, 1859 – April 13, 1860	Elected in 1858. Re-elected in 1859. [data missing]	Sierra
Harry J. Thornton	Beckenridge; Democratic	January 7, 1861 – June 19, 1861	Elected in 1860. Resigned.	Sierra
Vacant		June 19, 1861 – September 4, 1861	Vacant seat redistricted to the 22nd district before special election.	Sierra

=== 1860–1867: two seats ===
Years	Seat A			Seat B			Counties represented
Years	Member	Party	Electoral history	Member	Party	Electoral history	Counties represented
January 7, 1861 – May 15, 1862	William D. Harriman (Dutch Flat)	Republican	Elected in 1861. Re-elected in 1862. Retired.	Philip W. Thomas (Auburn)	Union; Democratic	Redistricted from the 17th district and re-elected in 1861. [data missing]	Placer
May 15, 1862 – December 7, 1863	William D. Harriman (Dutch Flat)	Union	Elected in 1861. Re-elected in 1862. Retired.	Felix B. Higgins (Auburn)	Union	Elected in 1862. [data missing]	Placer
December 7, 1863 – April 4, 1864	James E. Hale (Auburn)	Union	Elected in 1862. Re-elected in 1865. [data missing]	John Yule (Colfax)	Union	Elected in 1862. Re-elected in 1865. [data missing]	Placer
December 4, 1865 – April 2, 1866	James E. Hale (Auburn)	Union	Elected in 1862. Re-elected in 1865. [data missing]	John Yule (Colfax)	Union	Elected in 1862. Re-elected in 1865. [data missing]	Placer

=== 1867–1876: one seat ===
Senators	Party	Years served	Electoral history	Counties represented
Charles A. Tweed (Auburn)	Union	December 2, 1867 – April 4, 1870	Elected in 1867. [data missing]	Placer
Vacant		April 4, 1870 – December 4, 1871		Placer
Jacob H. Neff (Colfax)	Republican	December 4, 1871 – April 1, 1872	Elected in 1871. [data missing]	Placer
Noble Martin (Dutch Flat)	Independent	December 1, 1873 – April 3, 1876	Elected in 1873. [data missing]	Placer, El Dorado County, California

=== 1876–1878: two seats ===
Years	Seat A			Seat B			Counties represented
Years	Member	Party	Electoral history	Member	Party	Electoral history	Counties represented
December 6, 1875 – April 3, 1876	Samuel G. Hilborn (Vallejo)	Republican	Elected in 1875. Redistricted to the 19th district.	William M. Hill (Sonoma)	Democratic	Elected in 1875. [data missing]	Solano, Sonoma
December 3, 1877 – April 1, 1878	Vacant		Seat vacant due to Hillborn winning a seat for the 19th district.	William M. Hill (Sonoma)	Democratic	Elected in 1875. [data missing]	Solano, Sonoma

=== 1880–present: one seat ===
Senators	Party	Years served	Electoral history	Counties represented
William L. Anderson (Santa Rosa)	Democratic	January 5, 1880 – January 8, 1883	Elected in 1879. Re-elected in 1880. [data missing]	Lake, Napa, Sonoma
Dennis Spencer (Napa)	Democratic	January 8, 1883 – January 3, 1887	Elected in 1882. Re-elected in 1884. [data missing]	Lake, Napa, Sonoma
Thomas J. Pinder (San Francisco)	Democratic	January 3, 1887 – January 5, 1891	Elected in 1886. Re-elected in 1888. [data missing]	San Francisco
George H. Williams (San Francisco)	Republican	January 5, 1891 – January 2, 1893	Elected in 1890. Redistricted to the 24th district.	San Francisco
John T. Broderick (San Francisco)	Republican	January 2, 1893 – January 7, 1895	Redistricted from the 26th district and re-elected in 1892. [data missing]	San Francisco
Eugene F. Bert (San Francisco)	Republican	January 7, 1895 – January 2, 1899	Elected in 1894. [data missing]	San Francisco
Frank W. Burnett (San Francisco)	Republican	January 2, 1899 – January 5, 1903	Elected in 1898. [data missing]	San Francisco
Frank French (San Francisco)	Republican	January 5, 1903 – February 27, 1905	Elected in 1902. Expelled for accepting bribes.	San Francisco
Vacant		February 27, 1905 – January 7, 1907		San Francisco
Thomas J. Kennedy (San Francisco)	Democratic	January 7, 1907 – January 2, 1911	Elected in 1906. Lost re-election.	San Francisco
Edward F. Bryant (San Francisco)	Republican	January 2, 1911 – January 4, 1915	Elected in 1910. Retired to become San Francisco Tax Collector.	San Francisco
William S. Scott (San Francisco)	Progressive	January 4, 1915 – January 8, 1923	Elected in 1914. Re-elected in 1918. Retired to become a member of the San Francisco Board of Supervisors.	San Francisco
William S. Scott (San Francisco)	Republican	January 4, 1915 – January 8, 1923	Elected in 1914. Re-elected in 1918. Retired to become a member of the San Francisco Board of Supervisors.	San Francisco
P. J. Gray (San Francisco)	Republican	January 8, 1923 – April 23, 1930	Elected in 1922. Re-elected in 1926. Died.	San Francisco
Vacant		April 23, 1930 – January 5, 1931		San Francisco
Bradford S. Crittenden (Stockton)	Republican	January 5, 1931 – January 8, 1951	Elected in 1930. Re-elected in 1934. Re-elected in 1934. Re-elected in 1938. Re-elected in 1942. Re-elected in 1946. [data missing]	San Joaquin
Verne W. Hoffman (Lodi)	Republican	January 8, 1951 – January 3, 1955	Elected in 1950. Re-elected in 1954. Retired to run for State Assembly.	San Joaquin
Alan Short (Stockton)	Democratic	January 3, 1955 – January 2, 1967	Elected in 1954. Re-elected in 1958. Re-elected in 1962. Redistricted to the 6th district.	San Joaquin
William E. Coombs (Rialto)	Republican	January 2, 1967 – October 19, 1973	Elected in 1966. Re-elected in 1970. Resigned.	San Bernardino
Vacant		October 19, 1973 – January 23, 1974		San Bernardino
Ruben Ayala (Chino)	Democratic	January 23, 1974 – November 30, 1974	Elected to finish Coombs's term. Redistricted to the 32nd district.	San Bernardino
Alan Robbins (Los Angeles)	Democratic	December 2, 1974 – November 19, 1991	Elected in 1974. Re-elected in 1978. Re-elected in 1982. Re-elected in 1986. Re-elected in 1990. Resigned after being indicted due to the BRISPEC sting operation.	Los Angeles
Vacant		November 19, 1991 – July 2, 1992		Los Angeles
David Roberti (Los Angeles)	Democratic	July 2, 1992 – November 30, 1994	Resigned from the 23rd district and assumed seat to finish Robbins's term. Retired due to term limits.	Los Angeles
Herschel Rosenthal (Los Angeles)	Democratic	December 5, 1994 – November 30, 1998	Redistricted from the 22nd district and re-elected in 1994. Retired due to term limits.	Los Angeles
Richard Alarcon (Los Angeles)	Democratic	December 7, 1998 – November 30, 2006	Elected in 1998. Re-elected in 2002. Retired to run for State Assembly.	Los Angeles
Alex Padilla (Los Angeles)	Democratic	December 4, 2006 – November 30, 2014	Elected in 2006. Re-elected in 2010. Retired to run for Secretary of State.	Los Angeles
Connie Leyva (Chino)	Democratic	December 1, 2014 – November 30, 2022	Elected in 2014. Re-elected in 2018. Retired to run for San Bernardino County Supervisor.	Los Angeles, San Bernardino
Caroline Menjivar (Los Angeles)	Democratic	December 5, 2022 – present	Elected in 2022.	Los Angeles

== Election results (1990-present) ==
=== 2022 ===
2022 California State Senate 20th district election
Primary election
Party	Candidate	Votes	%
Democratic	Daniel Hertzberg	33,449	30.8
Democratic	Caroline Menjivar	32,302	29.8
Republican	Ely De La Cruz Ayao	27,713	25.5
Democratic	Seydi Alejandra Morales	15,078	13.9
Total votes		108,542	100.0
General election
Democratic	Caroline Menjivar	88,358	58.5
Democratic	Daniel Hertzberg	62,787	41.5
Total votes		151,145	100.0
Democratic hold			

=== 2018 ===
2018 California State Senate 20th district election
Primary election
Party	Candidate	Votes	%
Democratic	Connie Leyva (incumbent)	40,112	47.0
Republican	Matthew Munson	30,233	35.4
Democratic	Paul Vincent Avila	14,985	17.6
Total votes		85,330	100.0
General election
Democratic	Connie Leyva (incumbent)	137,748	69.5
Republican	Matthew Munson	60,578	30.5
Total votes		198,326	100.0
Democratic hold			

=== 2014 ===
2014 California State Senate 20th district election
Primary election
Party	Candidate	Votes	%
Republican	Matthew Munson	14,124	33.0
Democratic	Connie Leyva	9,096	21.2
Democratic	Alfonso "Al" Sanchez	7,958	18.6
Democratic	Shannon O'Brien	6,769	15.9
Democratic	Sylvia Robles	4,843	11.3
Total votes		42,790	100.0
General election
Democratic	Connie Leyva	56,943	62.4
Republican	Matthew Munson	34,256	37.6
Total votes		91,199	100.0
Democratic hold			

=== 2010 ===
2010 California State Senate 20th district election
Party	Candidate	Votes	%
Democratic	Alex Padilla (incumbent)	94,356	68.4
Republican	Kathleen "Suzy" Evans	37,420	27.1
Libertarian	Adrian Galysh	6,245	4.5
Total votes		138,051	100.0
Democratic hold			

=== 2006 ===
2006 California State Senate 20th district election
Party	Candidate	Votes	%
Democratic	Alex Padilla	84,459	74.9
Libertarian	Pamela Brown	28,377	25.1
Total votes		112,836	100.0
Democratic hold			

=== 2002 ===
2002 California State Senate 20th district election
Party	Candidate	Votes	%
Democratic	Richard Alarcon (incumbent)	88,902	100.0
Total votes		88,902	100.0
Democratic hold			

=== 1998 ===
1998 California State Senate 20th district election
Party	Candidate	Votes	%
Democratic	Richard Alarcón	82,258	65.9
Republican	Ollie M. McCaulley	34,120	27.4
Libertarian	Linda Starr	8,372	6.7
Total votes		124,750	100.0
Democratic hold			

=== 1994 ===
1994 California State Senate 20th district election
Party	Candidate	Votes	%
Democratic	Herschel Rosenthal (incumbent)	75,345	58.5
Republican	Dolores Bender White	53,528	41.5
Total votes		128,873	100.0
Democratic hold			

=== 1994 (recall) ===
1994 California State Senate 20th district special recall election
Choice	Votes	%
For	22,188	40.75
Against	32,261	59.25
Total	54,449	100.00

1994 California State Senate 20th district special recall election Successor of David Roberti if a majority vote in favor of recall
Party	Candidate	Votes	%
Democratic	Bill Dominguez	12,675	36.6
Republican	Delores White	9,008	26.0
Republican	Al Dib	6,143	17.7
Republican	Randy Linkmeyer	5,481	15.8
Republican	Larry Martz	1,355	3.9
Total votes		34,662	100.0

=== 1992 (special) ===
1992 California State Senate 20th district special election Vacancy resulting from the resignation of Alan Robbins
Party	Candidate	Votes	%
Democratic	David Roberti	44,411	43.0
Republican	Carol Rowen	39,715	38.4
Green	Glenn Trujillo Bailey	8,403	8.1
Libertarian	John Vernon	7,173	6.9
Peace and Freedom	Gary Preston Kast	3,646	3.5
Total votes		103,348	100.0
Democratic hold			

=== 1990 ===
1990 California State Senate 20th district election
Party	Candidate	Votes	%
Democratic	Alan Robbins (incumbent)	73,610	58.3
Republican	David J. Podegracz	43,129	34.1
Libertarian	William J. Mirken	9,575	7.6
Total votes		126,314	100.0
Democratic hold			

== See also ==
- California State Senate
- California State Senate districts
- Districts in California
