= California State Summer School for the Arts =

Summer program at the California Institute of the Arts

Coordinates: 34°23′35″N 118°34′01″W

California State Summer School for the Arts (CSSSA)
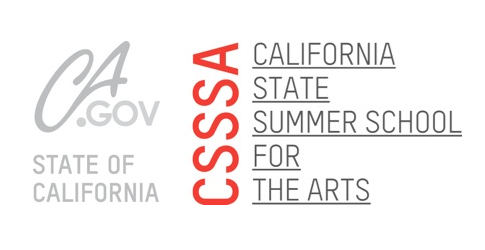
- CalArts, 24700 McBean Pkwy, Valencia, CA 91355

Information
- Former name: InnerSpark
- Established: 1987
- Classes offered: Creative Writing, Music, Film, Dance, Animation, Theatre, and Visual Arts
- Tuition: $4,723 (2024 for California residents)
- Website: www.csssa.ca.gov

The California State Summer School for the Arts, commonly known as CSSSA ("SEE-SUH"), is a rigorous four-week, pre-professional visual and performing arts training program for high school students held each summer at the California Institute of the Arts (CalArts). In late 2025, CSSSA that California State Polytechnic University, Pomona (Cal Poly Pomona) will be the new host site for future summer sessions beginning July 2026. The goal of CSSSA is to provide a supportive environment in which students acquire experience and training that extends beyond the practice and improvement of aesthetics and technique. Artistic disciplines offered by the program include: animation, creative writing, dance, film and video, music (including vocal arts), theatre arts, and visual arts. Its purpose is to provide a training ground for future artists who wish to pursue careers in the arts and entertainment industries in California. Admitted students are designated California Arts Scholars. Upon completion of the program, the students are awarded a Governor's Medallion, the highest distinction in California for artistically talented students. Founded in 1987, CSSSA is a California State agency funded through a unique public/private partnership.

== Admissions ==
Admission to the program is granted primarily to California state high school students, and up to twenty students from outside of California. The main criteria for admission is an applicant's potential for further professional development in the arts or creative fields after the end of the program. It's determined through an audition, portfolio review, screening, and teacher recommendations. Approximately one out of three applicants are accepted, parallel to the acceptance rate of CalArts.

== History ==
During the early 1980s, California was facing increasing competition from other states in the arts and entertainment industry, which is its third-largest source for tax revenue. Film, television, and recording studio complexes, traditionally built in California, were being built in Florida, Texas, among other places. With diminishing interest in the commercial art sector, many of California's non-profit fine arts institutions and the state's educational community were feeling the effects of a financial backlash.

In 1982, a three-year effort by the state's legislature began to create an educational environment for California's young artists. State Senator Alan Sieroty sponsored legislation to begin the planning process. A 24-member Advisory Council of legislative, arts, and industry leaders was appointed by the California Arts Council and the State Board of Education to explore the cause of talent drain and recommend statewide educational opportunities. One of the problems that the Advisory Council discovered was that many of California's young talents were leaving California to attend art programs in New York, North Carolina, Michigan, and other states — and would eventually stay to live and work there while they went to school.

The research by the Council concluded on September 28, 1985 when Governor Deukmejian signed the bill, authored by State Senator John Garamendi, which created the California State Summer School for the Arts. The first session was held in the summer of 1987.

The program would prove to be highly successful. By September 1990, Governor Deukmejian signed follow-up legislation to make it a permanent program of the state. By 1992, Governor Pete Wilson signed legislation to enable the program to accept a limited number of students from outside California, thereby making it a national program.

=== Program name ===
“InnerSpark” is an alternate name for CSSSA, which originated from the program itself. Students use both "InnerSpark" and "CSSSA" interchangeably. In 2010, the original name CSSSA (California State Summer School for the Arts) was reinstated as the official name for the program and is commonly used today.

== Student life ==
CSSSA students stay in separate male and female dormitories of Chouinard Hall at the California Institute of the Arts. Each student shares a room with two to three roommates, and has two to three suitemates in an adjoining room, with whom they share a bathroom. The CalArts campus has spacious lawns with shade trees, open fields and large hillside areas, providing room for informal team sports and relaxation. Due to the extreme summer heat, these facilities are vital for CSSSA students.

=== Identification Cards ===
Student pictures are taken during the first two days at CSSSA for I.D. cards, which must be worn at all times. Students use the I.D. card for authorization, food service in the cafeteria, recreation equipment, access into the library and supervised study and work areas.

=== Daily Newsletters ===
The Purple Blurrrb is a newsletter informing students of daily performances and other program-related events, which can be picked up by students in the cafeteria each morning. The name "Purple Blurrrb" originated at the first summer school in 1987, when it was printed on an old Ditto machine. The program now prints the newsletter on purple paper.

=== Off Campus Visits ===
Students are generally not allowed to leave the CalArts campus, other than to go to two plazas located nearby. On Saturday evenings and Sundays, students can receive an off campus pass to leave campus overnight, with parent permission. Visitors can come on campus with a visitor pass that students apply for, but are not allowed in dorms or around the pool. Additionally, the program organizes three weekend field trips that students can choose to attend. Destinations have included theater and/or musical productions, Disneyland, Six Flags Magic Mountain and the Getty museum.

=== College Credit ===
After successful completion of the program, students are eligible to receive three semester units of California State University course credit through the Office of Extended Education at Humboldt State University. These credits can be used as elective units toward a bachelor's degree at any of the campuses in the California State University system. They are also generally transferable to other colleges and universities throughout the United States.

== Faculty ==
CSSSA faculty is composed of professional artists and arts educators who specialize in the artistic disciplines taught at the program. Faculty members are selected on the basis of artistic excellence in their art forms as well as their teaching abilities. Housing for the faculty is located on the east side of the campus in Ahmanson Hall. Notable faculty and guest artist include Wayne Kramer, Alonzo King, Donald Byrd, Sanjay Patel, Lanz Fuller, Charles Fleischer, Diavolo Dance Theater, Conrad Vernon and Joe Ranft.

== Notable arts scholars ==
Former arts scholars include, James Franco, Zac Efron, Hayley Marie Norman, Kirsten Vangsness, Katharine McPhee, Taylor Lautner, Jeff Soto, Isabelle Fuhrman, Craig McCracken, Alex Hirsch, Martine Syms, Phoebe Bridgers, Lana Condor, and Amandla Stenberg.
