= David F. Bush =

American politician

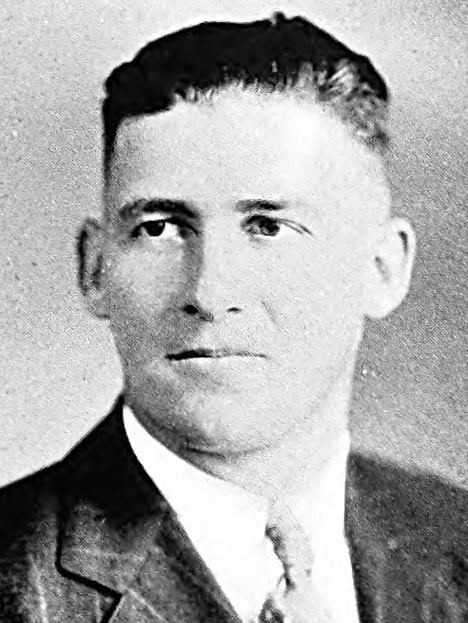

Member of the California Senate from the 22nd district
- In office January 5, 1931 – January 7, 1935
- Preceded by: John Joseph Crowley
- Succeeded by: James Charles Garrison

Personal details
- Born: March 20, 1895 Martinez, California, U.S.
- Died: May 28, 1975 (aged 80)
- Party: Republican
- Spouse: Aila Bernice Holm
- Children: 3

Military service
- Branch/service: United States Army
- Rank: 1st Lieutenant
- Battles/wars: World War I

David Fraizer Bush (March 20, 1895 – May 28, 1975) was an American politician who served in the California State Senate for the 22nd district from 1931 to 1935. During World War I he served in the United States Army.

== Honors ==
Marshall Scholarship
