= Richard Polanco =

American politician

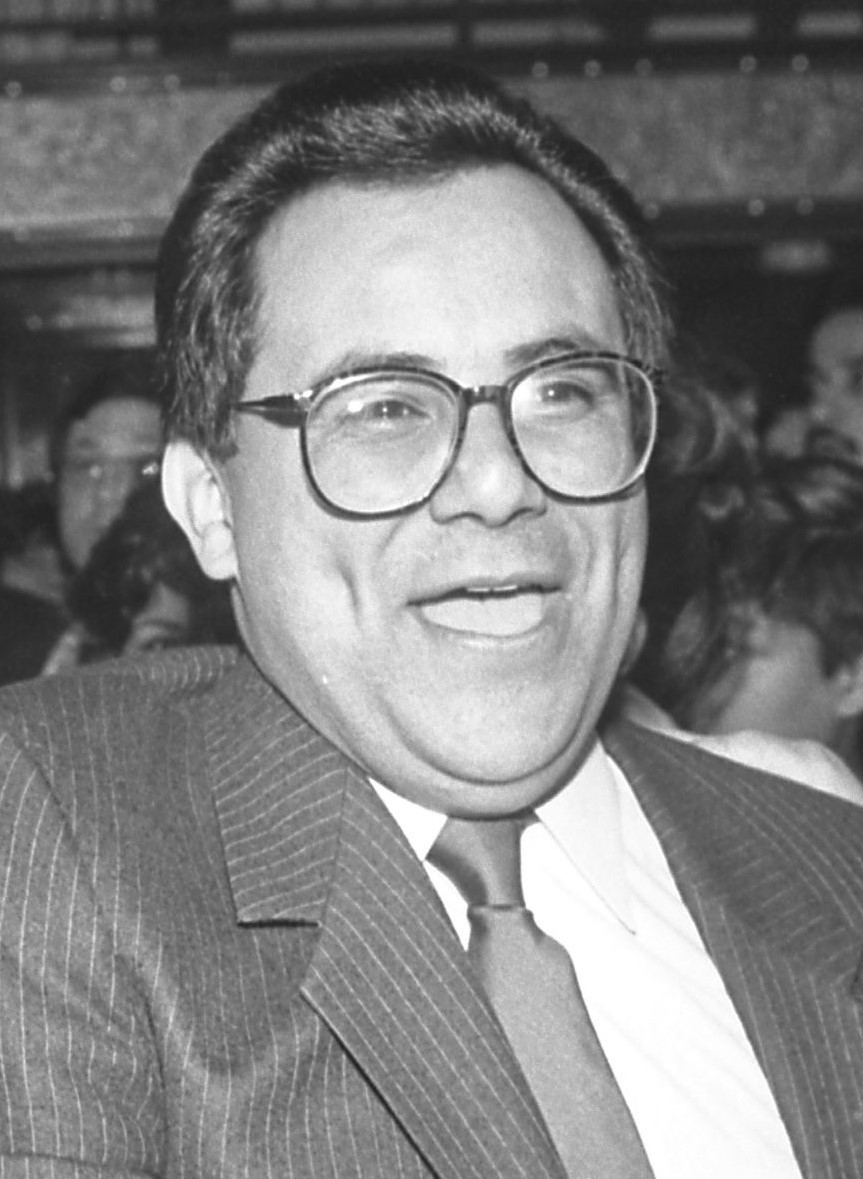
- Polanco in 1986

Member of the California Senate from the 22nd district
- In office December 5, 1994 – November 30, 2002
- Preceded by: Herschel Rosenthal
- Succeeded by: Gil Cedillo

Member of the California State Assembly from the 45th district
- In office December 7, 1992 – November 30, 1994
- Preceded by: Burt M. Margolin
- Succeeded by: Antonio Villaraigosa

Member of the California State Assembly from the 55th district
- In office June 5, 1986 – November 30, 1992
- Preceded by: Richard Alatorre
- Succeeded by: Juanita Millender-McDonald

Personal details
- Born: March 4, 1951 (age 75) Los Angeles, California, U.S.
- Party: Democratic
- Spouse: Olivia
- Children: 3

Richard G. Polanco (born March 4, 1951) is a former California State Senate Majority leader and member of the California State Assembly. He is known for his significant efforts in increasing Latino representation in the California Legislature.

== Background ==
First elected in 1986 to fill the unexpired term of Richard Alatorre who been elected in late 1985 to the Los Angeles City Council, Polanco served in the California State Assembly (District 55 in the 1980s, District 45 in the 1990s) for eight years. In 1994 he was elected to the California State Senate (District 22, Los Angeles) and served as Senate Majority Leader from 1998 until his retirement in 2002.

For most of his tenure in the Legislature, he served the Northeast Los Angeles area which includes Eagle Rock, Highland Park, Mount Washington, Glassell Park, Atwater Village, Lincoln Heights, El Sereno, Montecito Heights and Cypress, in addition to Boyle Heights and City Terrace. In the 1980s, he also represented the western areas of Pasadena, including the Northwest and Linda Vista areas. In the Senate, his areas expanded to include downtown Los Angeles, Chinatown, Little Tokyo and other communities.

Polanco is best known for his work with the Latino Legislative Caucus, which he chaired from 1990 to 2002. Under his leadership, the Senator led efforts to increase the number of Democratic Latino legislators from seven to 24. Eventually, his efforts contributed to election of the first Latino Speaker of the Assembly, Cruz Bustamante.

In 1998, he authored legislation that provided $115 million for after-school and summer school programs. He pioneered California’s citizenship education program assisting more than 500,000 Californians in becoming naturalized citizens.

Polanco authored legislation that created the California state holiday honoring the legendary labor and civil rights leader, Cesar Chavez.

In 2001 he was seen as the presumptive front-runner to succeed termed-out Los Angeles City Councilman Mike Hernandez, but he abruptly dropped out of the race for reasons that many found rather unconvincing. He has since begun a lucrative career as a lobbyist.

Prior to elected office, he served on the staff of Los Angeles County Supervisor Edmund D. Edelman, Assemblyman Richard Alatorre and former Governor Jerry Brown.

== Early life ==
A native of East Los Angeles, California, he graduated from James A. Garfield High School where he served as senior class president. He attended both the University of Redlands and the Universidad Nacional Mexico, majoring in business administration.
