= Caroline Menjivar =

American politician and Marine Corps veteran

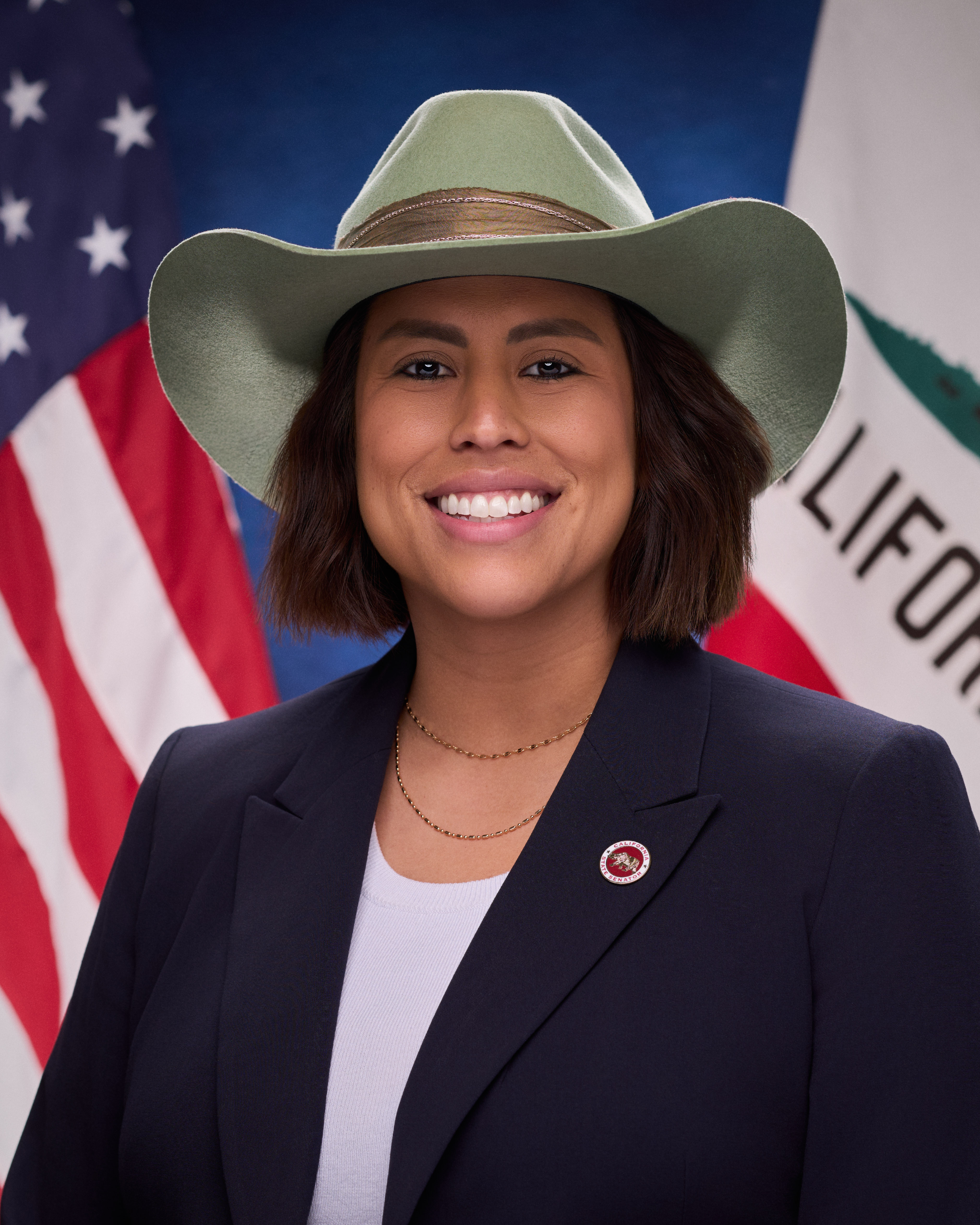
- Official portrait, 2026

Member of the California Senate from the 20th district
- Incumbent
- Assumed office December 5, 2022
- Preceding: Connie Leyva

Personal details
- Party: Democratic
- Education: UCLA; Cal State Northridge
- Website: Official website

Military service
- Allegiance: United States
- Branch: U.S. Marine Corps
- Service years: 2009–2016

Caroline Menjivar (born 1988 or 1989) is an American politician and United States Marine Corps veteran, who has served as a member of the California State Senate since 2022. A member of the Democratic Party, she represents the 20th district. She became the first LGBTQ legislator to represent San Fernando Valley.

== Early life ==
Menjivar's parents were immigrants from El Salvador, who moved to the United States during the country's civil war and met at MacArthur Park in Los Angeles, California. The family moved to the San Fernando Valley, where Menjivar was born and raised. She attended Encino Charter Elementary School. Her mother worked as a house cleaner and her father was a waiter at a country club in Studio City. They later opened a car dealership. When she was 14, Menjivar began working as a cashier at a restaurant. She graduated from Reseda High School. Her family was evicted from their home when she was 18 due to the 2008 financial crisis.

Menjivar applied for a position with the Los Angeles Fire Department but was rejected and instead joined the U. S. Marine Corps, serving between 2009 and 2016, at a time when "Don't Ask, Don't Tell" was in operation. She then began working as an EMT while earning her bachelor's degree in sociology from California State University, Northridge. While working for the Los Angeles Mayor's Gender Equity Office as a David Bohnett Fellow. She received a masters of social welfare from the University of California, Los Angeles. After graduating, she worked for former Los Angeles Councilwoman Nury Martinez as a field deputy and for former Los Angeles mayor Eric Garcetti where, as the East Valley representative, she organized the first LGBTQ+ Pride Car Parade in San Fernando Valley.

== Political career ==
Menjivar decided to run for the 20th district of the California State Senate in the 2022 state elections. She ran against Daniel Hertzberg, the son of the previous senator for the area, Robert Hertzberg, who was endorsed by the legislature's LGBTQ caucus. Menjivar faced criticism during the election after an audio recording of her former boss, Martinez, making racist statements was leaked. She was endorsed in the election by state senator Henry Stern, Los Angeles County Supervisor Sheila Kuehl, the San Fernando Valley Young Democrats, California Environmental Voters and the Los Angeles Times.

In the primary election on June 7, 2022, Menjivar received 29.76% of the vote, coming in second place behind Hertzberg, who received 30.82%. She won the general election with 58.46% of the vote and was sworn in to the state senate on December 5, 2022. She became the first LGBTQ legislator to represent San Fernando Valley. She was appointed to the senate's budget subcommittee #3 on health and human services, and other committees focusing on health, human services and veterans affairs.

In 2025, amid the California housing shortage, Menjivar voted against SB79, a bill that would address the shortage by allowing construction of apartment buildings near major public transportation hubs in California. Menjivar expressed opposition to the bill, saying that housing should not be built near transit lines in her district that "are not going to be utilized by working class individuals."

== Personal life ==
Menjivar is married to Jocelyn Tapia, a marriage and family therapist. She is a member of the board of directors for the Los Angeles chapter of GLSEN.

== Electoral history ==
2022 California State Senate 20th district election
Primary election
Party	Candidate	Votes	%
Democratic	Daniel Hertzberg	33,449	30.8
Democratic	Caroline Menjivar	32,302	29.8
Republican	Ely De La Cruz Ayao	27,713	25.5
Democratic	Seydi Alejandra Morales	15,078	13.9
Total votes		108,542	100.0
General election
Democratic	Caroline Menjivar	88,358	58.5
Democratic	Daniel Hertzberg	62,787	41.5
Total votes		151,145	100.0
Democratic hold			
