= Herschel Rosenthal =

American politician

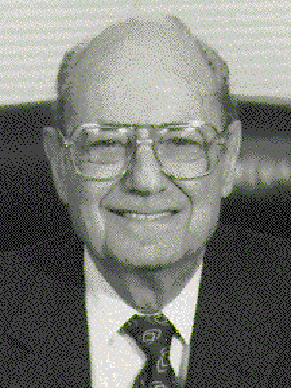
- Official portrait, 1997

Member of the California State Senate
- In office December 6, 1982 – November 30, 1998
- Preceded by: Alan Sieroty
- Succeeded by: Richard Alarcon
- Constituency: 22nd district (1982–1994); 20th district (1994–1998)

Member of the California State Assembly from the 45th district district
- In office December 2, 1974 – November 30, 1982
- Preceded by: Walter J. Karabian
- Succeeded by: Burt M. Margolin

Personal details
- Born: March 13, 1918 St. Louis, Missouri, U.S.
- Died: June 19, 2009 (aged 91) Hollywood, California, U.S.
- Party: Democratic
- Spouse: Patricia Rosenthal
- Children: 2

Military service
- Allegiance: United States
- Branch/service: United States Navy
- Battles/wars: World War II

Herschel Rosenthal (March 13, 1918 – June 19, 2009) was an American politician from California and a member of the Democratic Party.

== Political career ==
A member of the Los Angeles City Community Redevelopment Agency, Rosenthal first won election to the California State Assembly in 1974, representing West Los Angeles. He won easy reelection in 1976, 1978 and 1980. In 1982 he left the assembly to run for the state senate seat being vacated by Democrat Alan Sieroty and served in the upper house from 1982 until term-limits forced him from office in 1998.

After the 1991 reapportionment moved Rosenthal's 22nd state senate district into the East Los Angeles area, he was basically left "districtless", although his current term didn't expire until 1994. He opted to run anyway in the newly drawn 23rd district, which picked up much of his old West Los Angeles territory but went on to lose the primary to then assemblyman Tom Hayden by less than 1000 votes In 1994, he chose to seek his final term in the 20th district being vacated by term-limited state senate President Pro Tem David Roberti (D-Van Nuys). The district, based largely in the San Fernando Valley, containted some territory Rosenthal had previously represented.

== Death ==
Rosenthal died on June 19, 2009, at the age of 91.

== Electoral history ==
Member, California State Assembly: 1974–1982 Member, California State Senate : 1982–1998
Year	Office	Democrat	Votes	Pct	Republican	Votes	Pct
1974	California State Assembly; District 45	Herschel Rosenthal	54,730	63.2%	Betty Mikol	29,059	33.6%
1976	California State Assembly; District 45	Herschel Rosenthal	68,878	67.9%	Betty Mikol	32,555	32.1%
1978	California State Assembly; District 45	Herschel Rosenthal	58,243	67.8%	Gary Wheelock	24,647	28.7%
1980	California State Assembly; District 45	Herschel Rosenthal	61,208	63.6%	Eleanor Parker	26,440	27.5%
1982	California State Senate; District 22	Herschel Rosenthal	146,511	63.6%	Earle Robinson	77,782	32%
1986	California State Senate; District 22	Herschel Rosenthal	146,713	67.9%	Daniel Ward Sias	62,841	29.1%
1990	California State Senate; District 22	Herschel Rosenthal	129,939	64.6%	Michael Shrager	62,193	30.9%
1992	California State Senate; District 23	Tom Hayden 37% Herschel Rosenthal 37%	198,425	55.9%	Leonard McRoskey	117,455	33.1%
1994	California State Senate; District 20	Herschel Rosenthal	75,345	58.5%	Dolores White	53,528	41.5%

California Assembly
Preceded by Walter J. Karabian	Member of the California State Assembly; 45th District; December 4, 1974 – November 30, 1982	Succeeded by Burt M. Margolin
California Senate
Preceded by Alan Sieroty	Member of the California State from the 20th district November 30, 1982 – November 30, 1998	Succeeded by Richard Alarcon
