= Districts in California =

Geographical division of the U.S. state

The U.S. state of California is geographically divided into overlapping sets of districts for political and administrative purposes.

== History of California political districts ==
From the founding of the state until 2008, the responsibility of redrawing the state's Congressional, Assembly, Senate, and Board of Equalization districts had been exercised by the California State Legislature.

In November 2008, California voters passed Proposition 11, the Voters FIRST Act, which took political redistricting responsibility away from the state legislature and instead established a 14-member statewide redistricting commission composed of five Republicans, five Democrats, and four not affiliated with either of those two parties but registered with another party or as decline-to-state. The California Citizens Redistricting Commission was initially charged with updating the state assembly, senate, and Board of Equalization district boundaries starting with the 2010 census. Another initiative, Proposition 20, passed in 2010, expanded the Commission responsibilities to also include the state Congressional districts.

== Congressional districts ==
Since 2023, California has been divided into 52 Congressional districts. The districts were drawn in 2021 by the California Citizens Redistricting Commission following the 2020 United States Census, and redrawn by the voters in 2025 with the passage of Proposition 50. The most congressional districts California has ever had was 53, which was from 2003 until 2023.

Each district elects a representative to serve in the United States House of Representatives as part of California's congressional delegation.

== State legislative districts ==
=== State Senate districts ===
California is divided into 40 State Senate districts, each of which elects a senator to the State Senate. Twice the size of an Assembly district, each senate district contains about 931,000 people. The combined Senate roster is available from senate.ca.gov/senators. The members of the California Senate Republican caucus are listed at cssrc.us/senators.aspx.

Prior to 1968, state senate districts were restricted such that one county could only hold at most one seat. This led to the situation of Los Angeles County, with 6 million residents as of 1968, receiving 600 times less representation than residents of Alpine County and Calaveras County, some of California's least populous counties. The Reynolds v. Sims decision by the United States Supreme Court compelled all states to draw up districts that were apportioned by population rather than geography. As such, boundaries were changed such that equal representation was provided.

=== State Assembly districts ===
California is divided into 80 State Assembly districts, each of which elects a member to the State Assembly. Each assembly district contains about 466,000 people. Each Assembly member is limited to three terms by a referendum passed by California voters. In March 2008, Proposition 93 unsuccessfully attempted to change term limits to a maximum of twelve years or six terms instead of three.

The California Assembly Democratic Caucus members are listed at asmdc.org/democratic-members. The California Assembly Republican Caucus members are listed at asmrc.org/members/.

== California Appellate Court districts ==
The California Court of Appeal is divided into six appellate districts, based on geography. Some of the appellate districts are further divided into Divisions.

=== First District ===
The California Court of Appeal for the First District is located in San Francisco. Its jurisdiction is over the following counties: Alameda, Contra Costa, Del Norte, Humboldt, Lake, Marin, Mendocino, Napa, San Francisco, San Mateo, Solano, and Sonoma. It is divided into five non-geographical divisions with four justices each.

=== Second District ===
The California Court of Appeal for the Second District has its main courthouse in Los Angeles and the secondary courthouse, hosting Division Six, in Ventura. Division Six handles appeals from San Luis Obispo, Santa Barbara, and Ventura Counties, while Divisions One through Five, Seven, and Eight handle appeals from Los Angeles County. Each division has four justices.

=== Third District ===
The California Court of Appeal for the Third District is located in Sacramento. Its jurisdiction is over the following counties: Alpine, Amador, Butte, Calaveras, Colusa, El Dorado, Glenn, Lassen, Modoc, Mono, Nevada, Placer, Plumas, Sacramento, San Joaquin, Shasta, Sierra, Siskiyou, Sutter, Tehama, Trinity, Yolo, and Yuba. It has 11 justices and is not divided into divisions.

=== Fourth District ===
The California Court of Appeal for the Fourth District is unique in that it is divided into three geographical divisions that are administratively separate, which even have different case number systems, and yet remain referred to as a single district.

==== Division One ====
The Division One courthouse is located in San Diego. It handles appeals from Imperial and San Diego Counties. It has 10 justices.

==== Division Two ====
The Division Two courthouse is located in Riverside. It handles appeals from Inyo, Riverside, and San Bernardino Counties. It has seven justices. It is the only California appellate court that issues a tentative opinion before oral argument.

==== Division Three ====
The Division Three courthouse is located in Santa Ana. It handles appeals from Orange County. It has eight justices.

=== Fifth District ===
The California Court of Appeal for the Fifth District is located in Fresno. Its jurisdiction covers the following counties: Fresno, Kern, Kings, Madera, Mariposa, Merced, Stanislaus, Tulare, and Tuolumne. It has nine justices.

=== Sixth District ===
The California Court of Appeal for the Sixth District is located in San Jose. Its jurisdiction covers San Benito, Santa Clara, Santa Cruz, and Monterey Counties. It has seven justices.

== Board of Equalization districts ==
A map of the four districts for California's Board of Equalization effective 2023 thru 2035. First District Second District Third District Fourth District

California's Board of Equalization is a public agency charged with tax administration and fee collection. For the purposes of tax administration, the Board of Equalization divides the state into four Equalization Districts, each with its own elected board member.

=== First District ===
The first Equalization District is made up of the following counties: Alpine, Amador, Butte, Calaveras, Colusa, El Dorado, Fresno, Glenn, Inyo, Kern, Kings, Lassen, Madera, Mariposa, Merced, Modoc, Mono, Nevada, Placer, Plumas, Sacramento, San Joaquin, Shasta, Sierra, Siskiyou, Solano, Stanislaus, Sutter, Tehama, Tulare, Tuolumne, Yolo County, Yuba, and the desert portion of San Bernardino.

=== Second District ===
The second Equalization District is made up of the following counties: Alameda, Contra Costa, Del Norte, Humboldt, Lake, Marin, Mendocino, Monterey, Napa, San Benito, San Francisco, San Luis Obispo, San Mateo, Santa Barbara, Santa Clara, Santa Cruz, Sonoma, Trinity, and Ventura

=== Third District ===
The third Equalization District is made up entirely of Los Angeles County.

=== Fourth District ===
The fourth Equalization District is made up of the following counties: Imperial County, Orange, Riverside, San Diego, and the non-desert portion of San Bernardino.

== See also ==
- Elections in California
- Politics of California
- Government of California
- California ballot proposition
- List of California ballot propositions
- Local government in California
