= California State Senate =

Upper house of the California State Legislature

Coordinates: 38°34′36″N 121°29′37″W

- 2025–2026 Session

Type
- Type: Upper house
- Term limits: 3 terms (12 years)

History
- New session started: December 5, 2022

Leadership
- President: Eleni Kounalakis (D) since January 7, 2019
- President pro tempore: Monique Limón (D) since November 17, 2025
- Majority Leader: Angelique Ashby (D) since December 23, 2025
- Minority Leader: Roger Niello (R) since November 5, 2026

Structure
- Seats: 40
- Political groups: Majority: Democratic (29); Minority: Republican (10); Vacant: Vacant (1)
- Length of term: 4 years
- Authority: Article 4, California Constitution
- Salary: $114,877/year + $211 per diem

Elections
- Voting system: Nonpartisan blanket primary
- Last election: November 3, 2026 (20 seats)
- Next election: November 7, 2028 (20 seats)
- Redistricting: California Citizens Redistricting Commission

Motto
- Senatoris est civitatis libertatem tueri ("It is a senator's duty to protect the liberty of the people.")

Meeting place
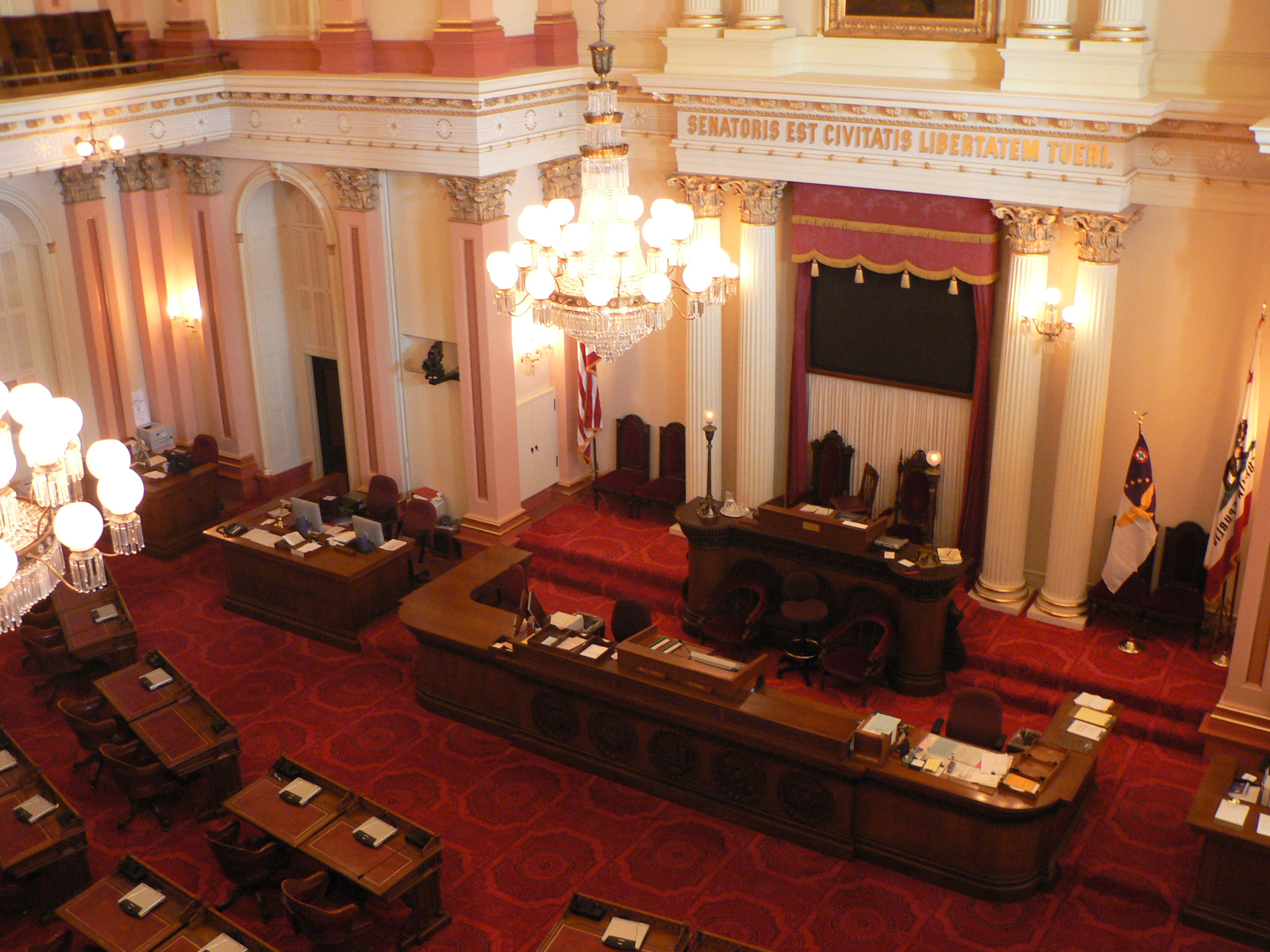
- State Senate Chamber; California State Capitol; Sacramento, California

Website
- senate.ca.gov

Rules
- Standing Rules of the Senate

The California State Senate is the upper house of the California State Legislature (the lower house being the California State Assembly). The state senate convenes, along with the state assembly, at the California State Capitol in Sacramento.

Neither house has expanded from the sizes set in the 1879 constitution, and each of the 40 state senators represents approximately 931,349 people. This is a higher number than that of any other state legislative house and than that of California's representatives in the United States House of Representatives, and each state senator represents more than the population of five U.S. states. In the current legislative session, the Democratic Party holds 29 out of the 40 seats, which constitutes a 73% majority, more than the two-thirds supermajority threshold of 27.

== History ==
The 1849 constitution of California provided that the "number of Senators shall not be less than one third, nor more than one half of that of the members of the Assembly..." The 1849 constitution also provided that senators served two-year terms and were to be elected bienally, with the total number of senators being divided into two classes so that one half of the senators would be elected annually.

Following the ratification of the 1879 constitution of California, the constitution prescribed that the senate is composed of 40 senators and that all senators must have resided within California for three years and their district for one year. Such districts were to be "as nearly equal in population as may be, and composed of contiguous territory". There was to be one senate district for each senator. Such districts were also required to preserve political boundaries: "In the formation of such districts, no county, or city and county, shall be divided, unless it contain a sufficient population within itself to form two or more districts; nor shall a part of any county, or of any city and county, be united with any other county, or city and county, in forming any district."

Between 1933 and 1967, state legislative districts were drawn according to the "Little Federal Model" by which Assembly seats were drawn according to population and senate seats were drawn according to county lines. The guidelines were that no senate district would include more than three counties and none would include less than one complete county. This led to the situation of a populous county such as Los Angeles County (1960 population of 6 million) being accorded the same number of state senators (one) as less populous counties such as Alpine County (1960 pop. 397). The senate districts remained unaltered from 1933 to 1967, regardless of the changes in the population distribution. In Reynolds v. Sims, the United States Supreme Court compelled all states to draw up districts with equal population. As such, boundaries were changed to comply with the ruling. The California State Senate has never been expanded since the enactment of the 1879 constitution. In 1962, voters were asked via initiative California Proposition 23 whether to expand the state senate by 10 seats, thereby increasing the size of the body to 50 seats, and to abandon the little federal model. This proposition was rejected by the voters 46.65% - 53.35% (2,181,758 - 2,495,440).

== Leadership ==
The lieutenant governor is the ex officio president of the senate, and may only cast a vote to break a tie. The president pro tempore is elected by the majority party caucus, followed by confirmation of the full senate. Other leaders, such as the majority and minority leaders, are elected by their respective party caucuses according to each party's strength in the chamber.

As of 2025, the president pro tempore is Democrat Monique Limón of Santa Barbara. The majority leader is Democrat Angelique Ashby of Sacramento, and the minority leader is Republican Roger Niello of Fair Oaks.

== Terms of office ==
Each state senator represents a population roughly equivalent to the State of Delaware. As a result of Proposition 140 in 1990 and Proposition 28 in 2012, members elected to the legislature prior to 2012 are restricted by term limits to two four-year terms (eight years), while those elected in or after 2012 are allowed to serve 12 years in the legislature in any combination of four-year state senate or two-year state assembly terms.

Members of the state senate serve four-year terms. Every two years, half of the senate's 40 seats are subject to election. This is in contrast to the state assembly, in which all 80 seats in the assembly are subject to election every two years.

== Meeting chamber ==
The red tones of the California State Senate chamber are based on the British House of Lords, which is outfitted in a similar color. The dais rests along a wall shaped like an "E", with its central projection housing the rostrum. The lower tier dais runs across the entire chamber, there are several chairs and computers used by the senate officers, the most prominent seat is reserved for the secretary who calls the roll. The higher tier is smaller, with three chairs, the two largest and most ornate chairs are used by the president pro tempore (right chair) and the lieutenant governor (left chair). The third and smallest chair, placed in the center, is used by the presiding officer (acting in place of the pro tem) and is rarely sat in as the president is expected to stand. There are four other chairs flanking the dais used by the highest non-member officials attending the senate, a foreign dignitary or state officer for example. Each of the 40 senators is provided a desk, microphone and two chairs, one for the senator, another for guests or legislative aides. Almost every decorating element is identical to the assembly chamber. Along the cornice appears a portrait of George Washington and the Latin quotation senatoris est civitatis libertatem tueri ("It is the duty of the senator to guard the civil liberties of the Commonwealth").

== Composition ==
↓
29	10
Democratic	Republican

Affiliation	Party (Shading indicates majority caucus)		Total	Vacant
Affiliation	Democratic	Republican	Total	
End of previous legislature	31	9	40	0
Begin (Note: Republican Janet Nguyen resigned on November 30, 2024, after being elected to the Orange County Board of Supervisors.)	30	9	39	1
March 11, 2025 (Note: Republican Tony Strickland sworn in to succeed Nguyen.)	30	10	40	0
September 1, 2026 (Note: Democrat Aisha Wahab resigned on September 1, 2026, after being elected to the U.S. House of Representatives from California's 14th congressional district.)	29	10	39	1
Latest voting share	74.4%	25.6%		

=== Officers ===
Position	Name	Party	District
Lieutenant Governor and President of the Senate	Eleni Kounalakis	Democratic	California
President pro tempore	Monique Limón	Democratic	21st-Santa Barbara
Majority leader	Angelique Ashby	Democratic	8th–Sacramento
Democratic Caucus Chair	Caroline Menjivar	Democratic	20th-Los Angeles
Minority leader	Roger Niello	Republican	6th–Fair Oaks
Secretary	Erika Contreras		
Sergeant-at-Arms	Katrina Rodriguez		
Chaplain	Sister Michelle Gorman, RSM		

The secretary, the sergeant-at-arms, and the chaplain are not members of the legislature.

=== Members ===
District	Name	Party	Residence	Start	Term limited	Notes
1	Megan Dahle	Republican	Bieber	2024	2028	Previously served in the Assembly from 2019 to 2024.
2	Mike McGuire	Democratic	Healdsburg	2014	2026	Previously served as president pro Tempore from 2024 to 2025
3	Christopher Cabaldon	Democratic	West Sacramento	2024	2036	
4	Marie Alvarado-Gil	Republican	Jackson	2022	2034	First elected as a Democrat before switching parties on August 8, 2024
5	Jerry McNerney	Democratic	Pleasanton	2024	2036	
6	Roger Niello	Republican	Fair Oaks	2022	2030	Previously served in the Assembly from 2004 to 2010.
7	Jesse Arreguín	Democratic	Berkeley	2024	2036	
8	Angelique Ashby	Democratic	Natomas	2022	2034	Majority Leader since December 23, 2025.
9	Tim Grayson	Democratic	Concord	2024	2028	Previously served in the Assembly from 2016 to 2024.
10	Vacant					
11	Scott Wiener	Democratic	San Francisco	2016	2028	
12	Shannon Grove	Republican	Bakersfield	2018	2026	Previously served as Minority Leader from 2019 to 2021 and in the Assembly from 2010 to 2016.
13	Josh Becker	Democratic	Menlo Park	2020	2032	
14	Anna Caballero	Democratic	Merced	2018	2026	Previously served in the Assembly from 2006 to 2010 and 2016 to 2018.
15	Dave Cortese	Democratic	San Jose	2020	2032	
16	Melissa Hurtado	Democratic	Bakersfield	2018	2030	
17	John Laird	Democratic	Santa Cruz	2020	2028	Previously served in the Assembly from 2002 to 2008.
18	Steve Padilla	Democratic	Chula Vista	2022	2034	
19	Rosilicie Ochoa Bogh	Republican	Yucaipa	2020	2032	
20	Caroline Menjivar	Democratic	San Fernando	2022	2034	
21	Monique Limón	Democratic	Santa Barbara	2020	2028	Previously served in the Assembly from 2016 to 2020. President pro tempore
22	Susan Rubio	Democratic	Baldwin Park	2018	2030	
23	Suzette Martinez Valladares	Republican	Santa Clarita	2024	2032	Previously served the Assembly from 2020 to 2022.
24	Ben Allen	Democratic	Santa Monica	2014	2026	
25	Sasha Renée Pérez	Democratic	Alhambra	2024	2036	
26	María Elena Durazo	Democratic	Los Angeles	2018	2030	
27	Henry Stern	Democratic	Malibu	2016	2028	
28	Lola Smallwood-Cuevas	Democratic	Los Angeles	2022	2034	
29	Eloise Reyes	Democratic	Colton	2024	2028	Previously served in the Assembly from 2016 to 2024
30	Bob Archuleta	Democratic	Pico Rivera	2018	2030	
31	Sabrina Cervantes	Democratic	Riverside	2024	2028	Previously served in the Assembly from 2016 to 2024
32	Kelly Seyarto	Republican	Murrieta	2022	2030	Previously served in the Assembly from 2020 to 2022.
33	Lena Gonzalez	Democratic	Long Beach	2019 (Note: Joined after a special election)	2032	
34	Tom Umberg	Democratic	Santa Ana	2018	2026	Previously served in the Assembly from 1990 to 1994 and 2004 to 2006.
35	Laura Richardson	Democratic	San Pedro	2024	2032	Previously served in the U.S. House from 2007 to 2013 and in the Assembly from 2006 to 2007.
36	Tony Strickland	Republican	Huntington Beach	2025	2030	Previously served in the Assembly from 1998 to 2004 and in the State Senate from 2008 to 2012
37	Steven Choi	Republican	Irvine	2024	2028	Previously served in the Assembly from 2016 to 2022
38	Catherine Blakespear	Democratic	Encinitas	2022	2034	
39	Akilah Weber	Democratic	San Diego	2024	2032	Previously served in the Assembly from 2021 to 2024
40	Brian Jones	Republican	Santee	2018	2026	Minority Leader. Previously served in the Assembly from 2010 to 2016.

=== Seating chart ===
				President; Kounalakis
				President pro tempore Limón
Niello	Ochoa Bogh	Hurtado	Becker	Smallwood-Cuevas	Stern	Cabaldon	McNerney	Durazo	Richardson	Caballero	Allen
Alvarado-Gil	Strickland	Choi	Grove	Pérez	Menjivar	Cervantes	Rubio	Weber Pierson	Blakespear	Gonzalez	Wiener
Valladares	Jones	Seyarto	Dahle	Arreguín	Umberg	Laird	Padilla	Grayson	Vacant	Cortese	Archuleta
				McGuire	Limón	Ashby	Reyes

== Standing committees ==
Current committees, chairs and vice chairs include:

Committee	Chair	Vice Chair
Agriculture	Anna Caballero (D)	Marie Alvarado-Gil (R)
Appropriations	Sabrina Cervantes (D)	Kelly Seyarto (R)
Banking and Financial Institutions	Tim Grayson (D)	Roger Niello (R)
Budget and Fiscal Review	John Laird (D)	Roger Niello (R)
Business, Professions and Economic Development	Aisha Wahab (D)	Steven Choi (R)
Education	Sasha Renée Pérez (D)	Rosilicie Ochoa Bogh (R)
Elections and Constitutional Amendments	Scott Wiener (D)	Steven Choi (R)
Emergency Management	Henry Stern (D)	Kelly Seyarto (R)
Energy, Utilities and Communications	Ben Allen (D)	Rosilicie Ochoa Bogh (R)
Environmental Quality	Catherine Blakespear (D)	Suzette Martinez Valladares (R)
Governmental Organization	Susan Rubio (D)	Suzette Martinez Valladares (R)
Health	Akilah Weber (D)	Suzette Martinez Valladares (R)
Housing	Jesse Arreguín (D)	Kelly Seyarto (R)
Human Services	Josh Becker (D)	Rosilicie Ochoa Bogh (R)
Insurance	Steve Padilla (D)	Roger Niello (R)
Judiciary	Tom Umberg (D)	Roger Niello (R)
Labor, Public Employment and Retirement	Lola Smallwood-Cuevas (D)	Tony Strickland (R)
Local Government	Maria Elena Durazo (D)	Steven Choi (R)
Military and Veterans Affairs	Bob Archuleta (D)	Shannon Grove (R)
Natural Resources and Water	Josh Becker (D)	Kelly Seyarto (R)
Privacy, Digital Technologies, and Consumer Protection	Christopher Cabaldon (D)	Brian Jones (R)
Public Safety	Jesse Arreguín (D)	Kelly Seyarto (R)
Revenue and Taxation	Jerry McNerney (D)	Marie Alvarado-Gil (R)
Rules	Monique Limón (D)	Shannon Grove (R)
Transportation	Dave Cortese (D)	Tony Strickland (R)

== See also ==
- List of special elections to the California State Senate
- California State Legislature
- List of California state legislatures
- California State Assembly
- California State Capitol
- California State Capitol Museum
- Districts in California
- Members of the California State Legislature
- Impeachment in California
