= List of 1990s American state and local politicians convicted of crimes =

This list includes American politicians at the state and local levels who have been convicted of felony crimes committed while in office by decade; this list encompasses the 1990s.

At the bottom of the article are links to related articles which deal with politicians who are involved in federal scandals (political and sexual), as well as differentiating among federal, state and local convictions. Also excluded are crimes which occur outside the politician's tenure in office unless they specifically stem from acts during his time of service.

Entries are arranged by date, from most current to less recent, and by state.

== Alabama ==
- Governor of Alabama H. Guy Hunt (R) was convicted of improperly using campaign money and was sentenced to five years' probation and fined $211,000. (1993)

== Alaska ==
- State Senator George Jacko (D) was found guilty of sexual harassment of a 17-year-old page (1993)

== Arizona ==
- State Representative Sue Laybe (D) was found guilty of bribery and given six months during the AZSCAM investigation (1990)
- State Representative Donald Kenney (R), was convicted in the AZSCAM investigation for taking a bribe of $55,000 in a gym bag and was sentenced to five years in prison. (1990)
- State Representative James Hartdegen (R), pleaded guilty to violating three campaign laws and was forced to resign as part of the AZSCAM investigation. (1990)
- State Representative James Meredith (R), was found guilty of making false campaign contributions during the AZSCAM investigation (1990)
- State Representative Bobby Raymond (D), investigated in the AZSCAM investigation, stated his favorite line was, "What's in it for me?" Found guilty of conspiracy and bribery and sentenced to two years in prison, with seven years of probation (1990)
- State Senator Jesus "Chuy" Higuera (D), guilty of taking a $4,000 bribe and demanding a shrimp and fax concession in all future casinos. Sentenced to two months in prison and four years' probation (1990)

== Arkansas ==
- Governor of Arkansas Jim Guy Tucker. (D) As part of the Whitewater investigation run by Kenneth Starr, Tucker was convicted of fraud and conspiracy and sentenced to four years' probation. (1996)
- Secretary of State Bill McCuen (D) pleaded guilty to bribery, kickbacks, tax evasion and trading in public office. He was sentenced to 17 years in prison and fined (1996)
- State Senator Carolyn Walker (D) was convicted of accepting payoffs for pledging to support gambling legislation as part of the AZSCAM Investigation. Sentenced to four years in prison (1991)

== California ==
- State Representative Brian Setencich (R) was convicted of tax evasion connected to his 1996 re-election campaign. (2000)
- The FBI's Bribery and Special Interest sting operation (BRISPEC, or "Shrimpscam") targeted corruption in the California legislature. Five convictions were obtained.
  1. State Senator Alan Robbins (D) resigned on November 21, 1991, in advance of pleading guilty to federal racketeering charges in connection with insurance-industry bribes.
  2. State Senator Joseph B. Montoya (D) was convicted in April 1990 of racketeering, extortion and money laundering and was sentenced to 6½ years in prison.
  3. State Senator Frank Hill (R) and his aide were found guilty of corruption and money laundering and sentenced to 46 months in prison. (1994)
  4. California Board of Equalization member Paul B. Carpenter (D) was found guilty of 11 counts of obstruction of justice and money laundering. (1993)
  5. State Assemblyman Pat Nolan (R) served 29 months for bribery in the FBI's BRISPEC sting operation.

=== Local ===
- Treasurer-Tax Collector of Orange County, California Robert Citron (D) convicted of fraud. (1995)

== Connecticut ==
- State Treasurer Paul J. Silvester (R) was sentenced to 21 months in prison for racketeering and money laundering. (1999)

=== Local ===
- Mayor of Waterbury Joseph J. Santopietro (R) was found guilty of taking a $25,000 payoff in return for $1 million in city pension funds. (1991)

== Florida ==
- Speaker of the Florida House of Representatives Bolley Johnson (D) was convicted of tax evasion. (1999)
- State Representative Marvin Couch (R) was arrested in Orlando for soliciting sex and pled guilty to unnatural or lascivious acts and exposure of his sexual organs. (1996)

=== Local ===
- Mayor of Miami Beach Alex Daoud (D) convicted of bribery. (1991)

== Georgia ==
- State Senator Ralph David Abernathy III (D) convicted of fraud. (1997)

== Guam ==
- Governor of Guam Ricardo Bordallo (D) was convicted on ten counts of corruption and was sentenced to nine years in prison and fined more than $100,000, but committed suicide the day before he was scheduled to begin serving his prison sentence (1990)

== Illinois ==
- State Senator Bruce A. Farley (D) sentenced to 18 months in prison for mail fraud (1999)
- State Senator John A. D'Arco, Jr. (D) served about three years in prison for bribery and extortion (1995)
- State Representative James DeLeo (D) caught in the "Operation Greylord" investigation of corruption in Cook County. He was indicted by a federal grand jury for taking bribes and negotiated guilty plea on a misdemeanor tax offense, and was placed on probation (1992)
- State Representative Joe Kotlarz (D) convicted and sentenced to jail for theft and conspiracy for pocketing in about $200,000 for a sale of state land to a company he once served as legal counsel (1997)
- State Treasurer Jerome Cosentino (D) was convicted of bank fraud and sentenced to nine months' home confinement. (1991)

=== Local ===
- Mayor of Markham, Illinois, Roger Agpawa (D) was convicted of mail fraud (1999)
- Alderman of Chicago Percy Giles (D) convicted of bribery. (1999)
- Alderman of Chicago Virgil Jones (D) convicted of bribery. (1998)
- Alderman of Chicago Lawrence Bloom (D) convicted of fraud. (1998)
- Alderman of Chicago John Madryzk (D) convicted of fraud. (1998)
- Alderman of Chicago Jesse Evans (D) convicted of racketeering. (1997)
- Alderman of Chicago Joseph Martinez (D) convicted of fraud. (1997)
- Alderman of Chicago Alan Streeter (D) convicted of bribery. (1996)
- Alderman of Chicago Ambrosio Medrano (D) convicted of bribery. (1996)
- Alderman of Chicago Fred Roti (D) convicted of bribery. (1996)
- Mayor of Chicago Heights Charles Panici (R) guilty of racketeering, bribery and extortion. Sentenced to 10 years. (1992)

== Hawaii ==
- State Representative Daniel J. Kihano (D) was sentenced to one year for one count of mail fraud. (1992)

== Kentucky ==
- FBI Operation Boptrot was an investigation into bribery and the horse racing industry. Approximately 10% of Kentucky's legislature, both the house and senate, was implicated in this scandal, some taking bribes for as little as $100. (1992) Legislators convicted as a result of Operation Boptrot included:
1. House Speaker Don Blandford (D) pleaded guilty after 1992 indictment on charges of extortion, racketeering and lying. He was sentenced to 64 months in prison and was fined $10,000.
2. State Representative Jerry Bronger (D) was indicted in 1992 and later pleaded guilty to charges that he accepted $2,000 in exchange for blocking legislation that would hurt harness race tracks. He was sentenced to 10 months in prison.
3. State Representative Clay Crupper (D) pleaded guilty after 1992 indictment and was fined $10,000 on charges of interstate travel in aide of racketeering.
4. State Senator Helen Garrett (D) was charged in 1992 with taking a $2,000 bribe from a track in exchange for helping pass legislation. She pleaded guilty and received four years' probation.
5. State Senator John Hall (D) pleaded guilty to conspiracy and other charges stemming from 1992 indictment in Operation BopTrot.
6. State Representative Ronny Layman (R) was indicted in 1992 on charges of conspiracy to commit extortion and making false statements to the FBI. He pleaded guilty and was sentenced to three months of home detention and community service.
7. State Senator David LeMaster (D) was indicted in 1993, and acquitted of extortion and racketeering, but convicted of lying. He was sentenced to a year in prison and fined $30,000, but served just one day after resigning from the legislature.
8. State Representative Bill McBee (D) was sentenced to a 15-month prison term for his role in Operation BopTrot.
9. State Senator Virgil Pearman (D) pleaded guilty after 1993 indictment charging that he took an illegal $3,000 campaign contribution. He was sentenced to three months in a halfway house, probation and was fined $5,000.
10. State Senator John Rogers (R), then the Minority Leader in the Kentucky Senate, was sentenced in 1994 to 42 months in prison after conviction on charges of extortion, conspiracy, attempted extortion, mail fraud and lying to the FBI.
11. State Senator Art Schmidt (R) pleaded guilty to a 1993 indictment for withholding the fact that he took a $20 cash payment from another senator tied to Operation BopTrot. He was sentenced to probation and fined $2,500.
12. State Senator Landon Sexton (R) pleaded guilty after 1994 indictment charging that he took an illegal $5,000 cash campaign contribution. He was sentenced to 15 consecutive weekends in jail, home detention for two months and probation for two years. In addition he was fined $5,000.
13. State Representative Bill Strong (D) pleaded guilty after 1993 indictment charges that he took an illegal $3,000 campaign contribution and did not deposit the money into his campaign fund. He was sentenced to three months in a halfway house, probation and was fined $3,000.
14. State Representative Richard Turner (R) pleaded guilty to a 1993 charge that he filed a false campaign finance report. Charges that he took an illegal $3,000 cash campaign contribution were dropped.
15. State Senator Patti Weaver (D) pleaded guilty after 1993 indictment charging that she was promised help finding a job in exchange for support of legislation. She was sentenced to weekend incarceration, probation and community service and was fined $10,000.

== Louisiana ==
- State Senator Melvin Irvin (D) convicted of bribery. (1991)
- Insurance Commissioner Doug Green (D) convicted of fraud and money laundering. (1991)

== Massachusetts ==
- State Representative Charles Flaherty (D) pleaded guilty to felony tax evasion for submitting false receipts regarding his business expenses and to violations of the state conflict of interests law. (1996)

== Local ==
- Middlesex County Sheriff John P. McGonigle (D) was convicted of tax evasion and pleaded guilty to conspiracy to commit racketeering for demanding kickbacks from two of his deputies. (1994)
- Essex County Sheriff Charles Reardon (D) pleaded guilty to taking kickbacks from process servers. (1996)

== Minnesota ==
- State Representative Robert Johnson (R) was convicted of three drunk driving arrests in a seven-week period. He was sentenced to a year in prison. (1995)
- State Representative Randy Staten (DFL) pled guilty to writing bad checks and was given a suspended sentence of 90 days, then probation. (1986)
- State Senator Harold Finn (DFL) was found guilty of stealing $1K from the Leech Lake Band of Chippewa. Sentenced to five years. (1995)

== Missouri ==
- Secretary of State Judith Moriarty (D) was impeached for misconduct involving back-dating of her son's election paperwork to hide a missed filing deadline, and convicted by the state supreme court.
- Speaker of the Missouri House of Representatives Bob F. Griffin (D), Griffin pleaded guilty on the second day of the second trial, to two counts of bribery and mail fraud in conjunction with the original highway scheme. He was sentenced to 48 months in prison, a $7,500 fine, and a $100 special penalty assessment. (1995)
- Missouri Attorney General William L. Webster (R) pleaded guilty to embezzlement charges and was sentenced to two years in prison. (1993)

== Nebraska ==
- State Treasurer Frank Marsh (R) was convicted of misdemeanor charges for making personal, long-distance telephone calls. (1991)

== New York ==
- Chief Judge of the New York Court of Appeals Sol Wachtler (R), was investigated for extortion and harassment. He pleaded guilty to one charge of threatening to kidnap a teenage girl and served 15 months. (1993)
- State Senator Andrew Jenkins (D) was convicted of illegal banking, sentenced to one year and one day. (1990)

== North Carolina ==
- Lieutenant Governor of North Carolina James C. Green (D), was convicted of income tax fraud and was sentenced to 33 months of house arrest. (1997)

== Ohio ==
- State Senator Jeff Johnson (D), was convicted of three counts of extortion. (1990)

== Oklahoma ==
- Governor of Oklahoma David Lee Walters (D) pleaded guilty to a misdemeanor election law violation. (1993)

== Pennsylvania ==
- State Representative Frank Serafini (R), was convicted of perjury (1999)
- Supreme Court Justice Rolf Larsen (D) convicted of conspiracy. (1992)
- Attorney General Ernie Preate (R) pleaded guilty to mail fraud. (1995)
- State Senator William G. Stinson (D) was found guilty of voter fraud and his election was reversed. (1994)
- State Senator William Lee Slocum, Jr. (R) pleaded guilty to federal charges of violating the Clean Water Act between 1983 and 1995, when he operated the Youngsville Sewage Treatment Plant and allowed repeated pollution discharges of raw sewage. Sentenced to one month in jail, five months of home detention, and fined $15,000.
- State Senator Dan S. Delp (R), pleaded guilty to buying a 19-year-old prostitute liquor and food using state money (1998)

== Rhode Island ==
- Governor of Rhode Island Edward Daniel DiPrete (R) pleaded guilty to bribery and racketeering charges and served one year in prison. (1998)

== South Carolina ==
- State Representative Paul Wayne Derrick (R) was convicted of accepting $1,000 in cash for his support of a gambling proposal being investigated in the FBI Operation, Lost Trust. (1991)
- State Representative Rick Lee (R) pleaded guilty to violating the Hobbs Act during the FBI Operation, Lost Trust. (1990)
- State Representative Daniel E. Winstead (R) from Charleston, pled guilty to accepting bribes. (1990)
- State Senator Robert Albert Kohn (R) State Senator from Charleston, pleaded guilty to conspiracy and bribery, and served seven months in prison.

== Texas ==
- Attorney General of Texas Dan Morales (D) pleaded guilty to mail fraud and tax evasion in relation to a $17 million tobacco industry settlement with the State of Texas in 1998. He was sentenced to four years in a federal prison for mail fraud and tax evasion in a case involving Texas' $17 billion settlement with the tobacco industry in 1998. He was released in 2007.
- State Senator Drew Nixon (R) was arrested on a charge of soliciting sex from an undercover Austin police officer which led to another charge of carrying an unlicensed, loaded gun for which he did not have a proper permit. The jury recommended probation on the prostitution charge, but jail time on the weapons charge. He was sentenced to six months in prison and fined $6,000. (1997)

== Vermont ==
- Lieutenant Governor of Vermont Brian D. Burns (D), was convicted of three counts of fraud for having claimed to be working full-time for a public policy association while he also claimed to be attending Harvard University full-time. He appealed but his conviction was affirmed. (1995)

== Virginia ==
- State Senator Robert E. Russell Sr. (R) was convicted of embezzling $6,750 from a nonprofit cycling club. (1995)

== West Virginia ==
- Governor of West Virginia Arch A. Moore Jr (R) guilty of mail fraud, tax fraud, extortion and obstruction of justice. (1990)

== District of Columbia ==
- Mayor of the District of Columbia Marion Barry (D) caught on videotape using drugs in an FBI sting (1990)

== See also ==
- List of federal political scandals in the United States
- List of federal political sex scandals in the United States

Federal politicians:

- List of American federal politicians convicted of crimes
- List of United States representatives expelled, censured, or reprimanded
- List of United States senators expelled or censured
