= 1986 California State Senate election =

- November 4, 1986

20 out of 40 seats in the California State Senate 21 seats needed for a majority
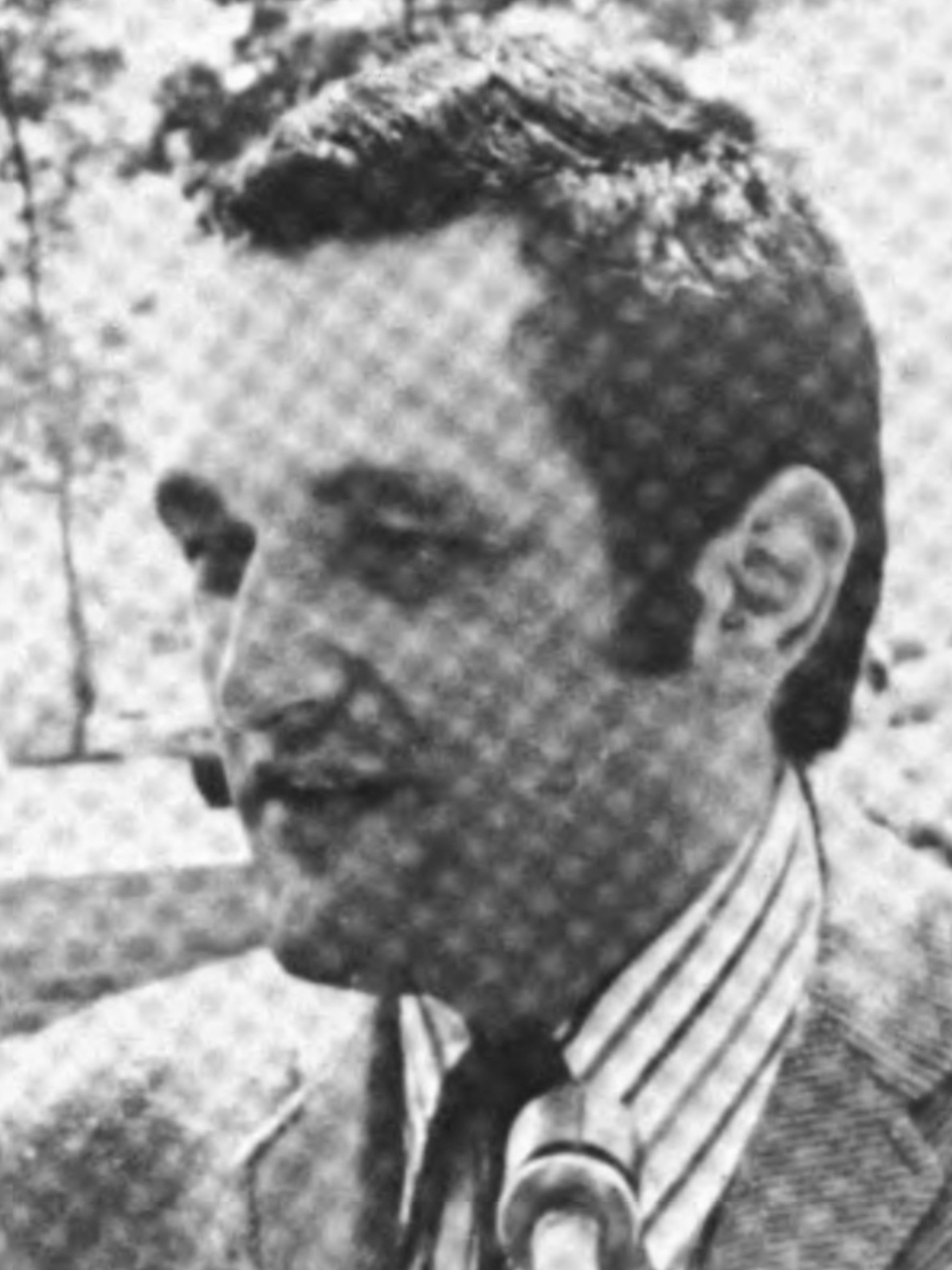

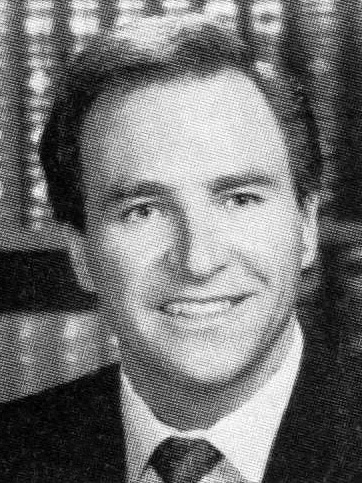
	Majority party	Minority party
Leader	David Roberti	Jim Nielsen
Party	Democratic	Republican
Leader's seat	23rd District–Los Angeles	4th District-Woodland
Last election	25	15
Seats before	26 (Note: Republican senator Milton Marks (3rd District) switched over to the Democrats on January 8, 1986.)	14
Seats after	25	14
Seat change	▼1	Steady
President pro tempore before election
David Roberti
Democratic
Elected President pro tempore
David Roberti
Democratic

The 1986 California State election was held on November 4, 1986, to determine which party would control the California State Senate for the following two years. All even-numbered seats were up for election, which consisted of half of the 40 senate seats. The primary was held on June 3, 1986. Prior to the election 26 seats were held by Democrats and 14 were held by Republicans. The general election saw Democrats losing a single seat, but retained control over the California State Senate.

== Retirements ==
1. 8th District: John Francis Foran (D) retired.
2. 16th District: Walter W. Stiern (D) retired.

== Closest races ==
Seats where the margin of victory was under 10%:

1. District 8, 1.40% (gain)
2. District 16, 4.00% (gain)

== Results ==
=== 2nd District ===
2nd District election, 1986
Party	Candidate	Votes	%
Democratic	Barry Keene (incumbent)		56.20%
Republican	Richard Brann		41.10%
Peace and Freedom	Pamela Elizondo		2.70%
Total votes			100.0%
Democratic hold			

=== 4th District ===
4th District election, 1986
Party	Candidate	Votes	%
Republican	Jim Nielsen (incumbent)		64.50%
Democratic	Franklin S. Cibula		35.50%
Total votes			100.0%
Republican hold			

=== 6th District ===
6th District election, 1986
Party	Candidate	Votes	%
Democratic	Leroy F. Greene (incumbent)		60.40%
Republican	Sandy Smoley		39.60%
Total votes			100.0%
Democratic hold			

=== 8th District ===
8th District election, 1986
Party	Candidate	Votes	%
Independent	Quentin L. Kopp		46.90%
Democratic	Lou Papan		45.50%
Republican	Russell Gray		7.60%
Total votes			100.0%
Independent gain from Democratic			

=== 10th District ===
10th District election, 1986
Party	Candidate	Votes	%
Democratic	Bill Lockyer (incumbent)		71.20%
Republican	Bruce W. Bergondy		28.80%
Total votes			100.0%
Democratic hold			

=== 12th District ===
12th District election, 1986
Party	Candidate	Votes	%
Democratic	Dan McCorquodale (incumbent)		56.00%
Republican	Tom Legan		44.00%
Total votes			100.0%
Democratic hold			

=== 14th District ===
14th District election, 1986
Party	Candidate	Votes	%
Republican	Kenneth L. Maddy (incumbent)		68.90%
Democratic	Michael T. LeSage		31.10%
Total votes			100.0%
Republican hold			

=== 16th District ===
16th District election, 1986
Party	Candidate	Votes	%
Republican	Don Rogers		52.00%
Democratic	Jim Young		48.00%
Total votes			100.0%
Republican gain from Democratic			

=== 18th District ===
18th District election, 1986
Party	Candidate	Votes	%
Democratic	Gary K. Hart (incumbent)		65.00%
Republican	DeWayne Holmdahl		33.50%
Libertarian	Jay C. Wood		1.50%
Total votes			100.0%
Democratic hold			

=== 20th District ===
20th District election, 1986
Party	Candidate	Votes	%
Democratic	Alan Robbins (incumbent)		65.30%
Republican	Lynn Robert Davis		34.70%
Total votes			100.0%
Democratic hold			

=== 22nd District ===
22nd District election, 1986
Party	Candidate	Votes	%
Democratic	Herschel Rosenthal (incumbent)		67.90%
Republican	Daniel Ward Sias		29.10%
Libertarian	Joseph A. Russell		1.70%
Peace and Freedom	Abby Kirk		1.30%
Total votes			100.0%
Democratic hold			

=== 24th District ===
24th District election, 1986
Party	Candidate	Votes	%
Democratic	Art Torres (incumbent)		72.10%
Republican	Lee David Prentiss		24.40%
Libertarian	Laura G. Brown		3.50%
Total votes			100.0%
Democratic hold			

=== 26th District ===
26th District election, 1986
Party	Candidate	Votes	%
Democratic	Joseph B. Montoya (incumbent)		100.0%
Total votes			100.0%
Democratic hold			

=== 28th District ===
28th District election, 1986
Party	Candidate	Votes	%
Democratic	Diane Watson (incumbent)		78.60%
Republican	Armand M. Vaquer		21.40%
Total votes			100.0%
Democratic hold			

=== 30th District ===
30th District election, 1986
Party	Candidate	Votes	%
Democratic	Ralph C. Dills (incumbent)		72.00%
Republican	Anthony Jay Gray		25.20%
Peace and Freedom	Lee H. Chauser		2.80%
Total votes			100.0%
Democratic hold			

=== 32nd District ===
32nd District election, 1986
Party	Candidate	Votes	%
Republican	Ed Royce (incumbent)		65.80%
Democratic	Francis X. Hoffman		34.20%
Total votes			100.0%
Republican hold			

=== 34th District ===
34th District election, 1986
Party	Candidate	Votes	%
Democratic	Ruben Ayala (incumbent)		65.90%
Republican	Steve Turner		34.10%
Total votes			100.0%
Democratic hold			

=== 36th District ===
36th District election, 1986
Party	Candidate	Votes	%
Democratic	Robert B. Presley (incumbent)		61.40%
Republican	Anne Richardson		38.60%
Total votes			100.0%
Democratic hold			

=== 38th District ===
38th District election, 1986
Party	Candidate	Votes	%
Republican	William A. Craven (incumbent)		85.10%
Libertarian	Betsy A. Mill		14.90%
Total votes			100.0%
Republican hold			

=== 40th District ===
40th District election, 1986
Party	Candidate	Votes	%
Democratic	Wadie P. Deddeh (incumbent)		69.40%
Republican	William M. Hoover		28.60%
Peace and Freedom	William R. Beard		2.00%
Total votes			100.0%
Democratic hold			
