= Anthony Beilenson =

American attorney and politician

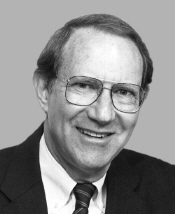

Member of the U.S. House of Representatives from California
- In office January 3, 1977 – January 3, 1997
- Preceded by: Thomas M. Rees
- Succeeded by: Brad Sherman
- Constituency: 23rd district (1977–1993); 24th district (1993–1997)

Member of the California State Senate
- In office December 2, 1974 – January 3, 1977
- Preceded by: Alan Robbins
- Succeeded by: Alan Sieroty
- Constituency: 22nd district
- In office January 2, 1967 – November 30, 1974
- Preceded by: Stephen P. Teale
- Succeeded by: Alfred H. Song
- Constituency: 26th district

Member of the California State Assembly from the 59th district
- In office January 7, 1963 – January 2, 1967
- Preceded by: Thomas M. Rees
- Succeeded by: Alan Sieroty

Personal details
- Born: October 26, 1932 New Rochelle, New York, U.S.
- Died: March 5, 2017 (aged 84) Westwood, Los Angeles, California, U.S.
- Party: Democratic
- Spouse: Dolores Beilenson
- Children: 3
- Education: Harvard University (BA, JD)

Anthony Charles Beilenson (October 26, 1932 – March 5, 2017) was an American lawyer and politician who served as a Democratic Congressman from Southern California. He served ten terms in the United States House of Representatives from 1977 until 1997.

== Early life and education ==
Beilenson was born in New Rochelle, New York, and grew up in an upscale suburb of New York City. He attended Harvard University, where he earned BA (1954) and JD (1957) degrees. Beilenson then relocated to Los Angeles and became a partner in a Beverly Hills law firm which represented the film industry.

== Political career ==
Beilenson was elected to the California State Assembly in 1963, serving until 1967, and then served in the California State Senate from 1967 to 1976. Among his accomplishments in the California State Legislature was winning enactment of the "Beilenson Act", which requires public hearings whenever hospitals in California are closed or reduce services. His most noteworthy accomplishment was as author of the 1967 Therapeutic Abortion Act, one of the most liberal abortion laws at that time, which legalized abortion when a woman's mental or physical health was at risk or if pregnancy resulted from rape or incest.

In 1968 Beilenson was an unsuccessful candidate for the Democratic nomination for the U.S. Senate, losing to Alan Cranston.

=== Congress ===
Beilenson was then elected to and served ten terms in the U.S. House of Representatives in the United States Congress, beginning in 1977, until his retirement in 1997. While in Congress, he served on the House Rules Committee, and as Chairman of the Permanent Select Committee on Intelligence, 1989–1991.

Beilenson was a member of the ReFormers Caucus of Issue One.

== Tributes ==
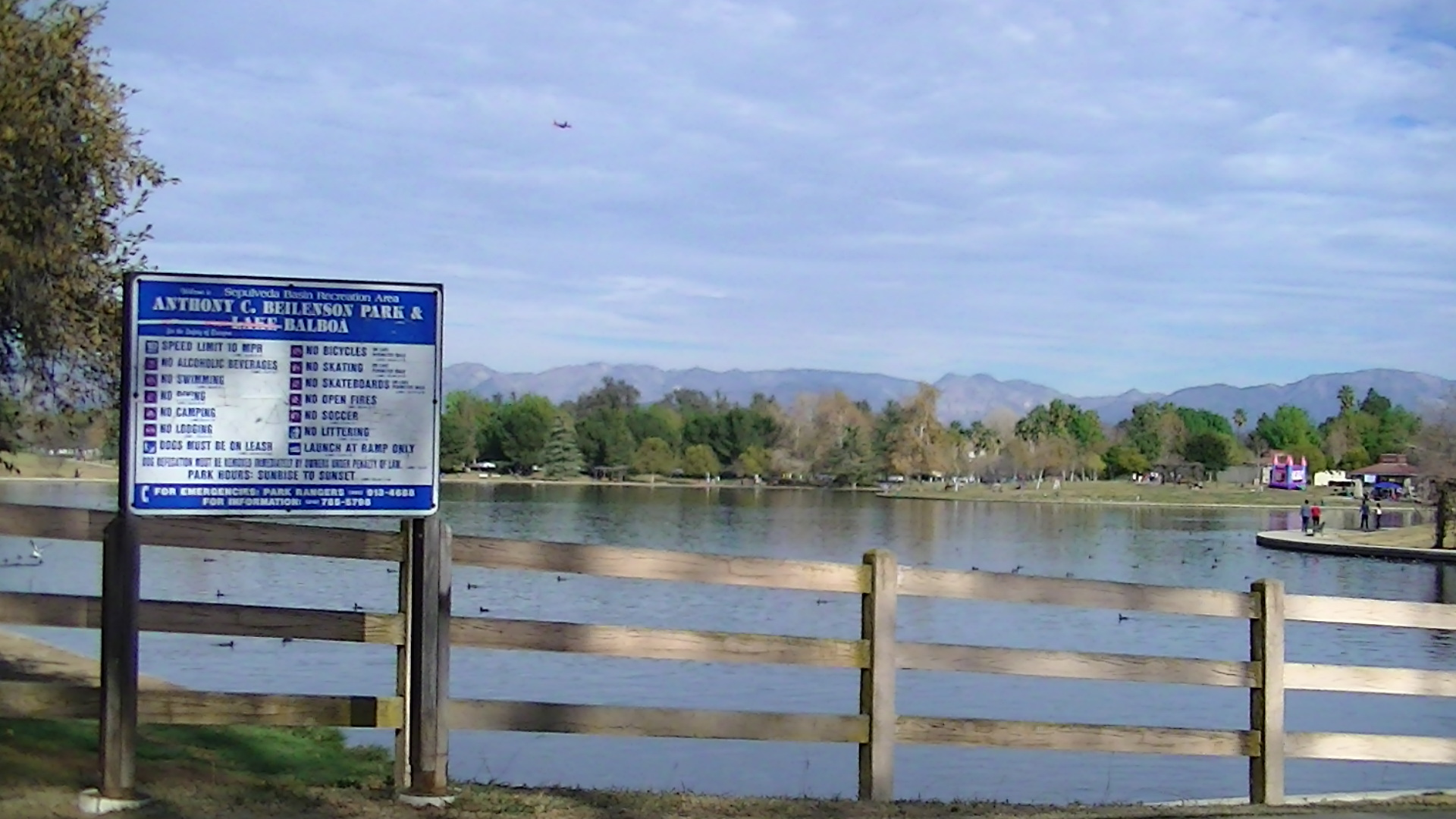
Balboa Lake in Anthony C. Beilenson Park

In 1998, in tribute to his long career of community and government service to California, Lake Balboa Park, in Van Nuys was renamed the "Anthony C. Beilenson Park". The park, which is located along Balboa Boulevard in Van Nuys, is an 80-acre (320,000 m^{2}) water recreation facility, with Balboa Lake at its center, and containing a universally accessible playground. The 27-acre (110,000 m^{2}) artificial lake is supplied with reclaimed water from the Donald C. Tillman Water Reclamation Plant.

He and his wife Dolores were also honored by the Jewish National Fund, San Fernando Valley Region, in 1991, for Congressman Beilenson's career of service as a public official, and for Dolores Beilenson's service as co-chair of the Congressional Wives for Soviet Jewry.

== Death ==
Beilenson died at his home in the Westwood neighborhood of Los Angeles on March 5, 2017, after suffering a heart attack. He was 84.

== Electoral history ==
Anthony Beilenson electoral history

1976 election
Party	Candidate	Votes	%
Democratic	Anthony C. Beilenson	130,619	60.2%
Republican	Thomas F. Bartman	86,434	39.8%
Total votes		217,053	100.0%
Turnout			
Democratic hold			

1978 election
Party	Candidate	Votes	%
Democratic	Anthony C. Beilenson (Incumbent)	117,498	65.6%
Republican	Joseph Barbara	61,496	34.4%
Total votes		178,994	100.0%
Turnout			
Democratic hold			

1980 election
Party	Candidate	Votes	%
Democratic	Anthony C. Beilenson (Incumbent)	126,020	63.2%
Republican	Robert "Bob" Winckler	62,742	31.5%
Libertarian	Jeffrey P. Lieb	10,623	5.3%
Total votes		199,385	100.0%
Turnout			
Democratic hold			

1982 election
Party	Candidate	Votes	%
Democratic	Anthony C. Beilenson (Incumbent)	120,788	59.6%
Republican	David Armor	82,031	40.4%
Total votes		202,819	100.0%
Turnout			
Democratic hold			

1984 election
Party	Candidate	Votes	%
Democratic	Anthony C. Beilenson (Incumbent)	140,461	61.6%
Republican	Claude W. Parrish	84,093	36.9%
Libertarian	Larry Leathers	3,580	1.6%
Total votes		228,134	100.0%
Turnout			
Democratic hold			

1986 election
Party	Candidate	Votes	%
Democratic	Anthony C. Beilenson (Incumbent)	121,468	65.7%
Republican	George Woolverton	58,746	31.8%
Peace and Freedom	Tom Hopke	2,521	1.4%
Libertarian	Taylor Rhodes	2,019	1.1%
Total votes		184,754	100.0%
Turnout			
Democratic hold			

1988 election
Party	Candidate	Votes	%
Democratic	Anthony C. Beilenson (Incumbent)	147,858	63.5%
Republican	Jim Salomon	77,184	33.1%
Libertarian	John R. Vernon	4,503	1.9%
Peace and Freedom	John Honigsfeld	3,316	1.4%
No party	Write-ins	18	0.0%
Total votes		232,879	100.0%
Turnout			
Democratic hold			

1990 election
Party	Candidate	Votes	%
Democratic	Anthony C. Beilenson (Incumbent)	103,141	61.7%
Republican	Jim Salomon	57,118	34.2%
Peace and Freedom	John Honigsfeld	6,834	4.1%
Total votes		167,093	100.0%
Turnout			
Democratic hold			

1992 United States House of Representatives elections in California, District 24
Party	Candidate	Votes	%
Democratic	Anthony C. Beilenson (inc.)	141,742	55.5
Republican	Tom McClintock	99,835	39.1
Peace and Freedom	John Paul Lindblad	13,690	5.4
Total votes		255,267	100.0
Turnout			
Democratic hold			

1994 United States House of Representatives elections in California, District 24
Party	Candidate	Votes	%
Democratic	Anthony C. Beilenson (inc.)	95,342	49.35
Republican	Rich Sybert	91,806	47.52
Libertarian	John C. Koehler	6,031	3.12
Total votes		193,179	100.0
Turnout			
Democratic hold			

1996 United States House of Representatives elections in California, District 24
Party	Candidate	Votes	%
Democratic	Brad Sherman	106,193	49.5
Republican	Rich Sybert	93,629	43.6
Peace and Freedom	Ralph Shroyer	6,267	2.9
Libertarian	Erich Miller	5,691	2.6
Natural Law	Ron Lawrence	3,068	1.4
Total votes		214,848	100.0
Turnout			
Democratic hold			

== See also ==
- List of Jewish members of the United States Congress

California Assembly
Preceded by Thomas M. Rees	Member of the California State Assembly from the 59th district 1963–1967	Succeeded by Alan Sieroty
California Senate
Preceded by Stephen P. Teale	Member of the California State Senate from the 26th district 1967–1974	Succeeded by Alfred H. Song
Preceded by Alan Robbins	Member of the California State Senate from the 22nd district 1974–1977	Succeeded by Alan Sieroty
U.S. House of Representatives
Preceded by Thomas M. Rees	Member of the U.S. House of Representatives from California's 23rd congressional district 1977–1993	Succeeded by Elton Gallegly
Preceded by Henry Waxman	Member of the U.S. House of Representatives from California's 24th congressional district 1993–1997	Succeeded by Brad Sherman
Political offices
Preceded by Louis Stokes; Ohio	Chairman of the House Intelligence Committee; 1989–1991	Succeeded by Dave McCurdy; Oklahoma
