= Tirone (surname) =

Tirone is a surname. Notable people with the surname include:

- Arturo O'Neill Tirone (1736–1814), Spanish Army officer and colonial administrator
- Paul Tirone (1951–2024), American politician
- Romeo Tirone, American cinematographer and television director
