= Massachusetts House of Representatives' 1st Essex district =

American legislative district

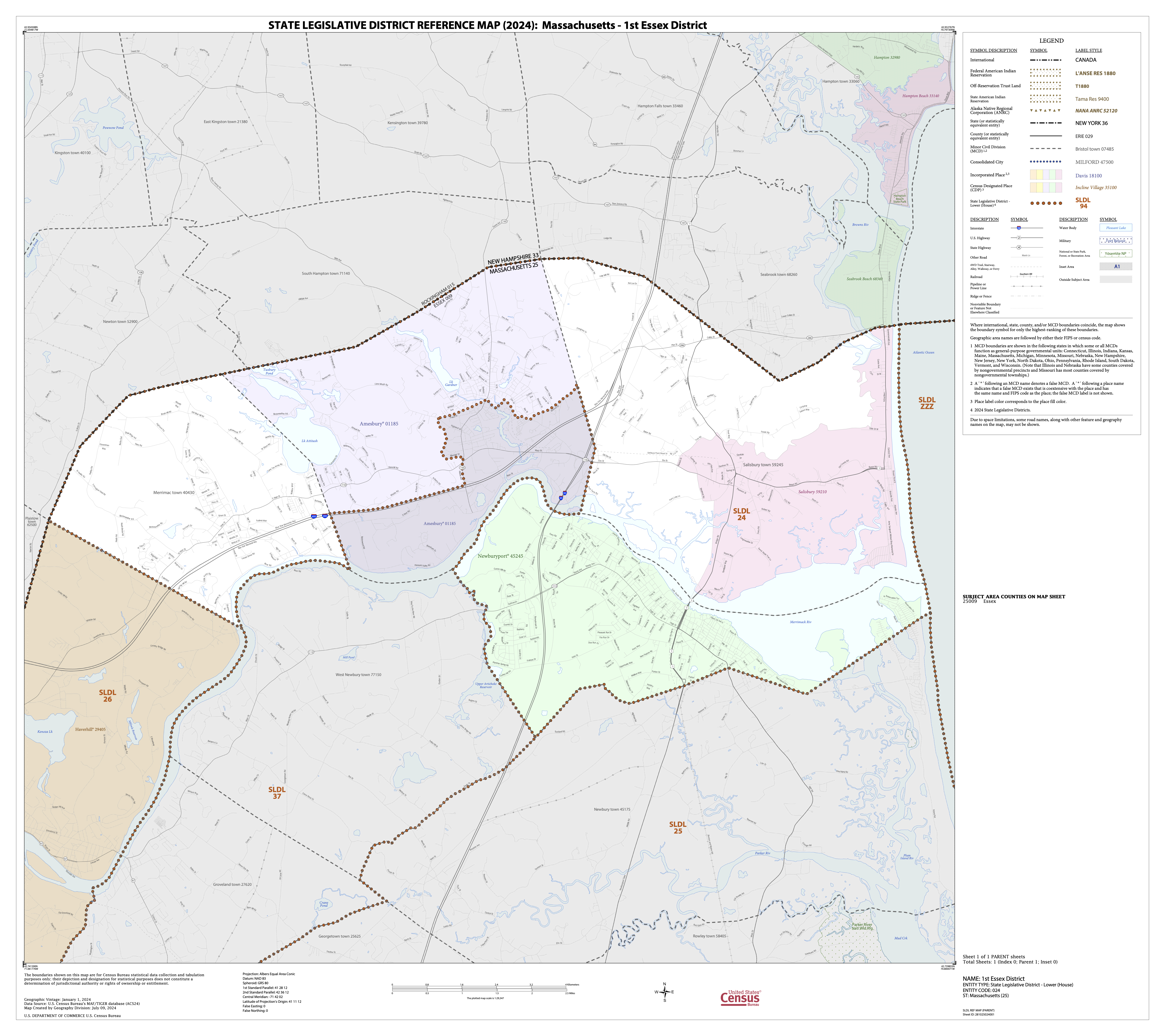
Map of Massachusetts House of Representatives' 1st Essex district, based on the 2020 United States census.

Massachusetts House of Representatives' 1st Essex district is one of 160 districts included in the lower house of the Massachusetts General Court. It covers part of Essex County. Democrat Dawne Shand of Newburyport has represented the district since 2023.

Following redistricting efforts in 2021, the 1st Essex shifted slightly west. The district now includes the towns of Merrimac and Salisbury; the city of Newburyport; and part of the city of Amesbury. Previously, the 1st Essex District included all of the city of Amesbury.

== Towns represented ==
The district includes the following localities:

- Amesbury
- Merrimac
- Newburyport
- Salisbury

The current district geographic boundary overlaps with those of the Massachusetts Senate's 1st Essex and Middlesex and 2nd Essex and Middlesex districts.

=== Former locales ===
The district previously covered the following:

- Gloucester, circa 1974
- Rockport, circa 1974
- West Newbury, circa 1872

== Representatives ==
- Winthrop O. Evans, circa 1859
- Elbridge M. Morse, circa 1859
- Charles Goss, circa 1888
- John C. Risteen, circa 1888
- George L. Briggs, circa 1920
- Henry M. Duggan, circa 1951

Member	Party	Years	Legis.	Electoral history	District towns
David E. Harrison (Gloucester)	Democratic	1965 – 1971	165th 166th 167th	Redistricted from 16th Essex district. Re-elected in 1964. Re-elected in 1966. Re-elected in 1968. Lost re-election in 1970.	
Richard R. Silva (Gloucester)	Republican	1971 – 1979	168th 169th 170th 171st	Elected in 1970. Re-elected in 1972. Re-elected in 1974. Re-elected in 1976. Redistricted to 5th Essex district.	1973–79: Rockport and part of Gloucester
Nicholas J. Costello	Democratic	1979 – 1983	172nd 173rd 174th	Elected in 1978. Re-elected in 1980. Re-elected in 1982. Elected to State Senate in 1983.	
Barbara Hildt (Amesbury)	Democratic	1983 – 1993	174th 175th 176th 177th 178th	Elected in 1983. Re-elected in 1984. Re-elected in 1986. Re-elected in 1988. Re-elected in 1990. Ran for U.S. House in 1992.	
Frank Cousins (Newburyport)	Republican	1993 – 1997	179th 180th	Elected in 1992. Re-elected in 1994. Elected Essex County Sheriff in 1996.	
Kevin L. Finnegan (Newburyport)	Republican	1997 – 2001	181st 182nd	Elected in 1996. Re-elected in 1998. Retired.	
Paul Tirone (Amesbury)	Democratic	2001 – 2003	183rd	Elected in 2000. Lost Democratic primary in 2002.	
Michael A. Costello (Newburyport)	Democratic	2003 – September 15, 2014	184th 185th 186th 187th 188th 189th	Elected in 2002. Re-elected in 2004. Re-elected in 2006. Re-elected in 2008. Re-elected in 2010. Re-elected in 2012. Resigned September 15, 2014.	
Michael A. Costello (Newburyport)	Democratic	2003 – September 15, 2014	184th 185th 186th 187th 188th 189th	Elected in 2002. Re-elected in 2004. Re-elected in 2006. Re-elected in 2008. Re-elected in 2010. Re-elected in 2012. Resigned September 15, 2014.	2013–21: Amesbury, Newburyport, and Salisbury
James Kelcourse (Amesbury)	Republican	2015 – June 29, 2022	190th 191st 191st 192nd	Elected in 2014. Re-elected in 2016. Re-elected in 2018. Re-elected in 2020; Resigned June 29, 2022.	2013–21: Amesbury, Newburyport, and Salisbury
James Kelcourse (Amesbury)	Republican	2015 – June 29, 2022	190th 191st 191st 192nd	Elected in 2014. Re-elected in 2016. Re-elected in 2018. Re-elected in 2020; Resigned June 29, 2022.	2021–present: Merrimac, Newburyport, Salisbury, and part of Amesbury
Dawne Shand (Newburyport)	Democratic	January 4, 2023 – present	193rd 194th	Elected in 2022. Re-elected in 2024.	2021–present: Merrimac, Newburyport, Salisbury, and part of Amesbury

== See also ==
- List of Massachusetts House of Representatives elections
- Other Essex County districts of the Massachusetts House of Representatives: 2nd, 3rd, 4th, 5th, 6th, 7th, 8th, 9th, 10th, 11th, 12th, 13th, 14th, 15th, 16th, 17th, 18th
- Essex County districts of the Massachusett Senate: 1st, 2nd, 3rd; 1st Essex and Middlesex; 2nd Essex and Middlesex
- List of Massachusetts General Courts
- List of former districts of the Massachusetts House of Representatives

== Images ==
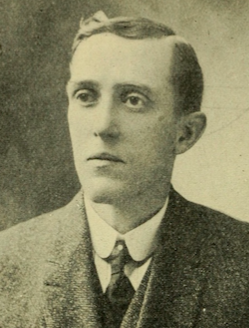
Samuel Porter

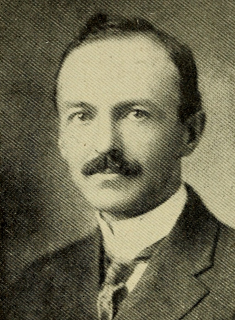
Albert Wadleigh

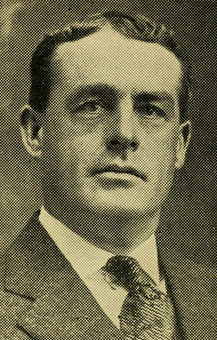
George Briggs

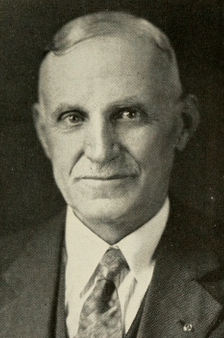
George Pettengill

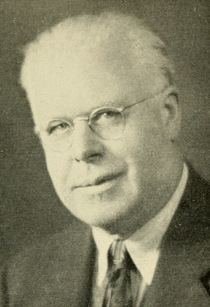
Colin Cameron

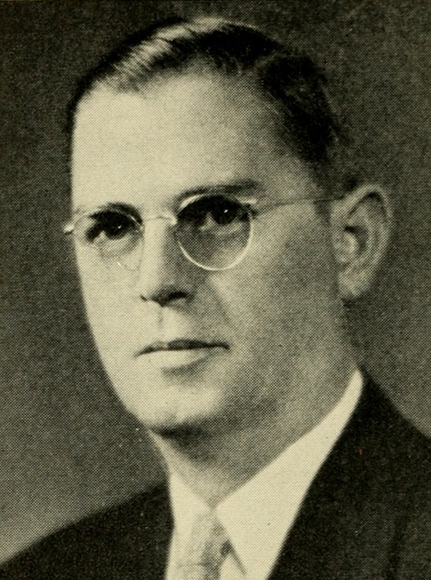
Henry Duggan
