= Thomas M. Rees =

American lawyer and politician (1925–2003)

Tom Rees
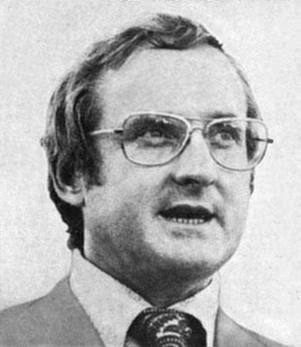

Member of the U.S. House of Representatives from California
- In office December 15, 1965 – January 3, 1977
- Preceded by: James Roosevelt
- Succeeded by: Anthony Beilenson
- Constituency: 26th district (1965–75); 23rd district (1975–77)

Member of the California Senate from the 38th district
- In office January 7, 1963 - January 9, 1966
- Preceded by: Richard B. Richards
- Succeeded by: Clair Burgener

Member of the California State Assembly from the 59th district
- In office January 3, 1955 – January 7, 1963
- Preceded by: Charles W. Lyon
- Succeeded by: Anthony Beilenson

Personal details
- Born: Thomas Markell Rees; March 26, 1925 Los Angeles, California, U.S.
- Died: December 9, 2003 (aged 78) Santa Cruz, California, U.S.
- Party: Democratic
- Education: Occidental College (B.A. 1950); University of California Law School (J.D. 1951)

Military service
- Branch/service: United States Army
- Battles/wars: World War II

Thomas Mankell "Tom" Rees (March 26, 1925 – December 9, 2003) was an American lawyer and politician who served six terms as a U.S. representative from California from 1965 to 1977.

== Early life and career ==
Born in Los Angeles, California, Rees was educated in local public schools. In 1950, he received a B.A. from Occidental College in Los Angeles, California. Beginning in 1951, he attended the University of California, Berkeley Law School. He served in the United States Army and was a lawyer in private practice.

He served as president of Compania del Pacifico, a Latin American export firm. He served as a member of the California State Assembly from 1955 to 1963, the California Senate from 1963 to 1966, and as a delegate to the Democratic National Conventions in 1956, 1960, 1964, and 1968.

== Congress ==
Rees was elected as a Democrat to the Eighty-ninth Congress, by special election, to fill the vacancy caused by the resignation of James Roosevelt, and re-elected to the five succeeding Congresses (December 15, 1965 – January 3, 1977). He did not seek reelection in 1976.

== Later career and death ==
After Congress, Rees lived in Scotts Valley, in Santa Cruz County. He served as president of Community Development and Management in San Jose, California. Rees died on December 9, 2003, in Santa Cruz, California.

== Electoral history ==
1965 special election
| Party | Candidate | Votes | % |
|---|---|---|---|
| Democratic | Thomas M. Rees | | 59.4 |
| Republican | Edward M. Marshall | | 40.6 |
| Total votes | | {{{votes}}} | 100.0 |
| Turnout | | | |
| Democratic hold | | | |

United States House of Representatives elections, 1966
| Party | Candidate | Votes | % |
|---|---|---|---|
| Democratic | Thomas M. Rees (incumbent) | 103,289 | 62.3 |
| Republican | Irving Teichner | 62,441 | 37.7 |
| Total votes | | 165,730 | 100.0 |
| Turnout | | | |
| Democratic hold | | | |

United States House of Representatives elections, 1968
| Party | Candidate | Votes | % |
|---|---|---|---|
| Democratic | Thomas M. Rees (incumbent) | 132,447 | 65.5 |
| Republican | Irving Teichner | 63,393 | 31.3 |
| Peace and Freedom | Jack Weinberg | 6,394 | 3.2 |
| Total votes | | 202,234 | 100.0 |
| Turnout | | | |
| Democratic hold | | | |

United States House of Representatives elections, 1970
| Party | Candidate | Votes | % |
|---|---|---|---|
| Democratic | Thomas M. Rees (incumbent) | 130,499 | 71.3 |
| Republican | Nathaniel Jay Friedman | 47,260 | 25.8 |
| Peace and Freedom | Lewis B. McCammon | 3,677 | 2.0 |
| American Independent | Howard E. Hallinan | 1,639 | 0.9 |
| Total votes | | 183,075 | 100.0 |
| Turnout | | | |
| Democratic hold | | | |

United States House of Representatives elections, 1972
| Party | Candidate | Votes | % |
|---|---|---|---|
| Democratic | Thomas M. Rees (incumbent) | 160,932 | 68.6 |
| Republican | Philip Robert Rutta | 65,473 | 27.9 |
| Peace and Freedom | Mike Timko | 8,094 | 3.5 |
| Total votes | | 234,499 | 100.0 |
| Turnout | | | |
| Democratic hold | | | |

1974 election
| Party | Candidate | Votes | % |
|---|---|---|---|
| Democratic | Thomas M. Rees | 119,239 | 71.4% |
| Republican | Jack E. Roberts | 47,615 | 28.6% |
| Total votes | | 166,854 | 100.0% |
| Turnout | | | |
| Democratic hold | | | |

U.S. House of Representatives
| Preceded by James Roosevelt | Member of the U.S. House of Representatives from California's 26th congressional district 1965–1975 | Succeeded by John H. Rousselot |
| Preceded by Del M. Clawson | Member of the U.S. House of Representatives from California's 23rd congressional district 1975–1977 | Succeeded by Anthony C. Beilenson |
