= Michael A. Costello =

American politician from Massachusetts

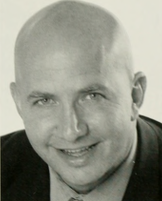
- Costello in 2005

Member of the Massachusetts House of Representatives from the First Essex district
- In office 2003 – September 15, 2014
- Preceded by: Paul Tirone
- Succeeded by: James Kelcourse

Personal details
- Born: May 5, 1965 (age 61) Lynn, Massachusetts
- Party: Democratic
- Spouse: Kerrin D'Archangelo
- Children: 2
- Education: Salem State University (BS); Suffolk University (JD)
- Occupation: Attorney

Michael A. Costello (born May 5, 1965) is an American attorney and former state representative who served in the Massachusetts House of Representatives from 2003 to 2014, representing the First Essex District.

== Education ==
Costello earned a Bachelor of Science from Salem State University in 1989 and earned a Juris Doctor from Suffolk University Law School in 1996.

== Early career ==
Costello was elected a councilor-at-large to the Newburyport City Council in 1997. Costello served as field director for the 1998 congressional campaign of John F. Tierney. He later served as chief of staff to state senator Joan Menard for nearly two years.

== State legislator ==
Costello was first elected in November 2002 to represent the First Essex District (encompassing Newburyport, Amesbury and Salisbury) and served until his resignation on September 15, 2014. In 2007, he received Legislator of the year award from the Massachusetts Bar Association.

He resigned effective 15 September 2014 to return to legal practice. Costello is currently a partner at Smith, Costello & Crawford in Salem, Massachusetts.
