= Dawne Shand =

Member of the Massachusetts House of Representatives

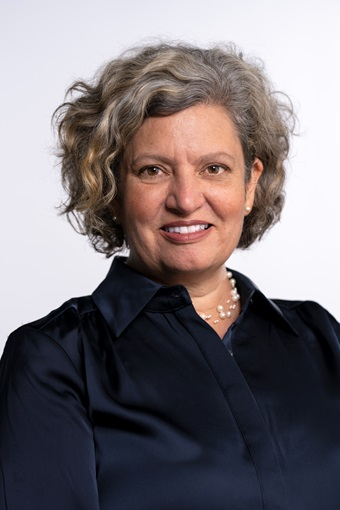

Member of the Massachusetts House of Representatives for the 1st Essex District
- Incumbent
- Assumed office January 4, 2023
- Preceded by: James Kelcourse

Personal details
- Born: 1969/1970 Selma, Alabama
- Party: Democratic
- Education: Emerson College (M.F.A.); University of Alabama (B.A.)
- Occupation: Political Activist; Author; Legislator
- Website: www.dawneshand.com

Dawne Shand (born 1969/1970 in Selma, Alabama) is a current member of the Massachusetts House of Representatives for the 1st Essex District. She lives in Newburyport.

Shand defeated Salisbury community leader Charles "CJ" Fitzwater in the 2022 election. Shand received 12,790 votes (59.6%) to Fitzwater's 8,657 (40.3%). Shand handily won the cities of Amesbury and Newburyport and narrowly won the town of Merrimac. Fitzwater won his home town of Salisbury by nearly 20 percentage points.

Prior to her election to the Massachusetts state legislature, Shand served as the president of the Massachusetts Women's Political Caucus. Shand’s sister, Newburyport City Councillor Heather Shand, also managed former state representative Jamie Belsito's campaign for congress in 2020 when she challenged incumbent Representative Seth Moulton. In addition to her political involvement, Shand has worked as a writer and a management consultant.
