= Alfred H. Song =

American politician

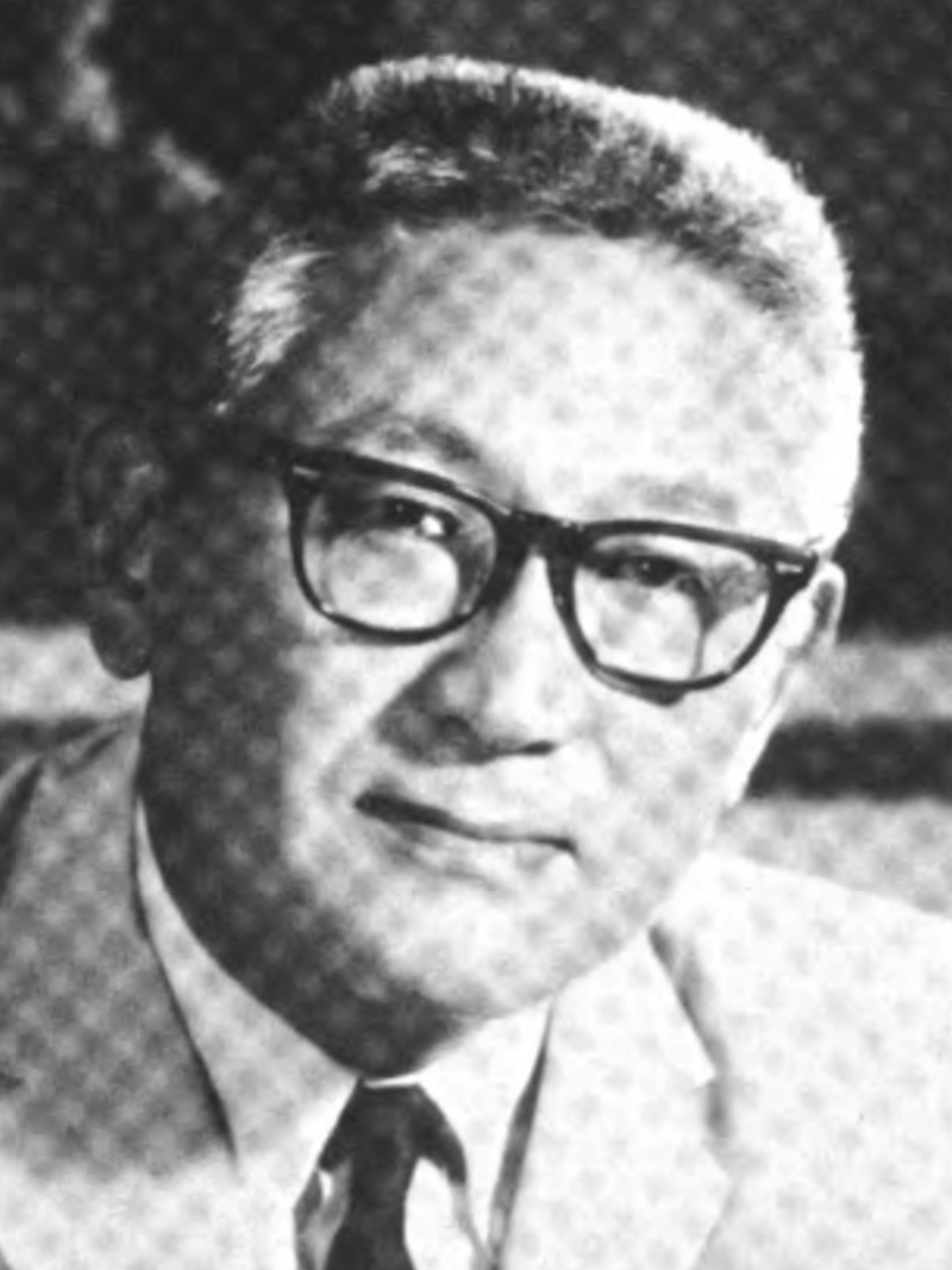
- Official portrait, 1971

Member of the California Senate from the 26th district
- In office December 2, 1974 – November 30, 1978
- Preceded by: Anthony Beilenson
- Succeeded by: Joseph B. Montoya

Member of the California Senate from the 28th district
- In office January 2, 1967 – November 30, 1974
- Preceded by: William "Bill" Symons Jr.
- Succeeded by: Ralph C. Dills

Member of the California State Assembly from the 45th district
- In office January 7, 1963 – January 2, 1967
- Preceded by: George Brown Jr.
- Succeeded by: Walter J. Karabian

Personal details
- Born: Alfred Hoyun Song; February 16, 1919 Territory of Hawaii
- Died: October 11, 2004 (aged 85) Irvine, California, U.S.
- Party: Democratic
- Spouse: Florence Eva Kim
- Children: 4
- Education: University of Southern California B.S. 1942, J.D. 1949, LLD 1967

Military service
- Branch/service: United States Army
- Battles/wars: World War II

Korean name
- Hangul: 송호연
- Hanja: 宋鎬燕
- RR: Song Hoyeon
- MR: Song Hoyŏn

Alfred Hoyun Song (February 16, 1919 – October 11, 2004) was an American politician served in the California State Assembly for the 45th district from 1963 to 1967. He served in the California State Senate for the 28th District from 1967 to 1974 and the 26th district from 1974 to 1978.

During World War II, he was drafted in the United States Army Air Corps in 1942. He took the officer's candidate examination and was sent to Shepherd Field in Texas for training and eventually to Miami Beach, Florida for Officer's Candidate School, after it was determined that he was a "friendly enemy alien." He was graduated a 2nd Lieutenant and would serve in the Air Corps until 1945. He is the first Asian American commissioned officer in the service that would become the United States Air Force.

Song was the first Korean American to serve in the California State Legislature.
