= Horatio G. Herrick =

American politician (1824–1904)

Horatio Gates Herrick

Sheriff of Essex County, Massachusetts
- In office 1866–1893
- Preceded by: James Cary
- Succeeded by: Samuel A. Johnson

Personal details
- Born: October 28, 1824 Alfred, Maine
- Died: April 18, 1904 (aged 79) Lawrence, Massachusetts
- Spouse: Isabella Sewell Paine (1848–1857; her death)
- Education: Bowdoin College, A.B. 1844
- Occupation: Lawyer; Sheriff; Politician

Military service
- Allegiance: United States of America; Union
- Branch/service: Union Army
- Years of service: May 1863 to October 1, 1865
- Rank: Provost Marshal
- Unit: 6th District of Massachusetts American Civil War

Horatio Gates Herrick (October 28, 1824 – April 18, 1904) was an American lawyer who served as sheriff of Essex County, Massachusetts.

== Early life ==
Herrick was born on October 28, 1824, in Alfred, Maine, to Benjamin J. and Mary (Conant) Herrick. His uncle was Joshua Herrick.

== Legal career ==
Herrick graduated from Bowdoin College in 1844. In 1847 he was admitted to the bar and began a law practice in North Berwick, Maine. Later that year he moved to Saugus, Massachusetts, and practiced law in Boston.

== Civil War ==
In 1862, Herrick was appointed draft commissioner for Essex County by Governor John Albion Andrew. In May 1863 he was commissioned captain and provost marshal for the Sixth District of Massachusetts by United States Secretary of War Edwin M. Stanton. He was mustered out on October 15, 1865.

== Political career ==
In November 1865, Herrick was elected sheriff of Essex County. He was reelected to nine consecutive three-year terms. In 1892 Herrick refused renomination. From 1871 to 1873 he was also a member of the Massachusetts Board of Prison Commissioners.

On January 1, 1866, Herrick moved to Lawrence, Massachusetts. There he served as a member of the school board. He was also the founding president of the Industrial School for Boys and a trustee of the Lawrence Savings Bank.

== Personal life and death ==
Herrick married Isabella Sewell Paine, daughter of John Treat Paine and Mary E. Rice (Goodwin) Paine on August 23, 1848. They had three children, Frederick St. Clair Herrick (1850–1884), John St. Clair Herrick (1855–1855), and Alice Bigelow Herrick (1856–1856). Paine died on January 12, 1857, in Saugus at the age of 26.

Herrick was an active member of the Methodist Episcopal Church and served a president of the Methodist Episcopal Church of Saugus Centre's Sunday school. In Lawrence he was an active member of the Haverhill Street Church.

In his later years, Herrick resided with Isabel J. (Ball) Herrick, the widow of his son, Frederick St. Clair Herrick. He died on April 18, 1904, at their home in Lawrence.
