= Kevin L. Finnegan =

American politician

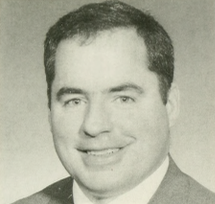

Member of the Massachusetts House of Representatives from the 1st Essex District
- In office 1996–2001
- Preceded by: Frank Cousins
- Succeeded by: Paul Tirone

Personal details
- Born: June 1, 1964 (age 62) Newburyport, Massachusetts
- Party: Republican
- Education: University of Massachusetts Lowell; Massachusetts School of Law
- Occupation: Politician; Civil servant

Kevin L. Finnegan (born June 1, 1964, in Newburyport, Massachusetts) an American politician and the current Clerk for the Peabody District Court in Peabody, Massachusetts. From 1997 to 2001 he represented the 1st Essex District in the Massachusetts House of Representatives. From 1994 to 1997 he was a member of the Newburyport City Council.

== Early life and education ==
Finnegan was born in Newburyport, Massachusetts on June 1, 1964. He graduated from the University of Massachusetts Lowell in 1996 and subsequently from the Massachusetts School of Law in 1999.
