= Robert Ellis Cahill =

American politician (1934–2005)

Sheriff of Essex County, Massachusetts
- In office 1975–1978
- Preceded by: Roger Wells
- Succeeded by: Charles Reardon

Member of the Massachusetts House of Representatives 7th Essex District
- In office 1970–1975
- Preceded by: Michael J. Harrington
- Succeeded by: J. Michael Ruane

Member of the Salem, Massachusetts City Council

Personal details
- Born: November 25, 1934 Salem, Massachusetts
- Died: June 19, 2005 (aged 70)
- Party: Democratic
- Education: Boston University
- Occupation: Public Relations; Sheriff; Politician; Folklorist; Author

Robert Ellis Cahill (November 25, 1934 – June 19, 2005) was an American folklorist and author. He was the author of more than three dozen books on New England history and folklore, as well as on scuba diving, shipwrecks and pirates.

== Politics ==
Cahill served in the Massachusetts House of Representatives from 1970 to 1975.

In 1974, Cahill was elected Sheriff of Essex County, Massachusetts. During his tenure as Sheriff, Cahill sought to modernize the department. The jails in Salem and Lawrence lacked toilets, which meant inmates had to defecate in buckets. There were also no rehabilitation programs in either jail and guards had no formal training. The minimum-security Correctional Alternative Center in Lawrence opened during Cahill's tenure. While serving as Sheriff, Cahill investigated an alleged curse Giles Corey placed on the office. He found that all Essex County Sheriffs as far back as he could trace either died in office of heart problems or retired due to "an ailment of the blood". In 1978, Cahill, who suffered from a rare blood disorder himself, retired after he suffered a heart attack and stroke.

== Writing ==
Several of Cahill's books center on the infamous Salem Witch Trials and related topics, such as accounts of the Salem "Witch Dungeon" and colonial era crime and punishment. Cahill was born and raised in Salem, Massachusetts and also wrote several auto-biographical books, one recounting his experiences as Sheriff, and another relating tales of his childhood growing up in New England during World War II.

Cahill's most widely distributed lore and histories are mostly in the form of small books that can still be found in large quantities within souvenir shops located at tourist attractions throughout New England.

=== Published books ===
New England Collectible Classics (Chandler-Smith Publishing)

- New England Witches and Wizards
- New England's Ghostly Haunts
- New England's Mad and Mysterious Men
- New England's Strange Sea Sagas
- Finding New England's Shipwrecks and Treasures
- New England's War Wonders
- New England's Visitors from Outer Space
- The Horrors of Salem's Witch Dungeon (The Lauren Robinson Story)
- The Old Irish of New England
- New England's Naughty Navy
- New England's Viking and Indian Wars
- New England's Riotous Revolution
- New England's Pirates and Lost Treasure
- New England's Mountain Madness

Old Salt Box Publishing House

- Things That Go Bump in the Night
- Strange Superstitions
- New England's Ancient Mysteries
- Haunted Ships of the North Atlantic
- Sugar and Spice
- Haunted Happenings
- Amazing Fish Stories
- Strange Beliefs, Customs & Superstitions
- Christmas Memories
- Cruel and Unusual Punishments
- Curious Customs and Cures
- Lighthouse Mysteries of the North Atlantic
- Diary of the Depths (Dorrance & Company)
- The Wayward Sheriffs of Witch County (Old Pine Tree Publishing House)
- The Balloon Tree: A Memoir of American Kids Growing Up During WWII (Old Pine Tree Publishing House)

=== Poems ===
- Col. Leslie's Retreat
