= Frank Cousins (American politician) =

American politician (born 1958)

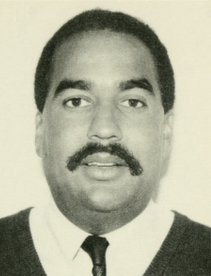
- Portrait of Frank Cousins

Essex County Sheriff
- In office 1996–2017
- Preceded by: Charles Reardon
- Succeeded by: Kevin Coppinger

Member of the Massachusetts House of Representatives from the 1st Essex District
- In office 1993–1996
- Preceded by: Barbara Hildt
- Succeeded by: Kevin L. Finnegan

Personal details
- Born: May 7, 1958 (age 68) Boston, Massachusetts
- Party: Republican
- Education: Newburyport High School
- Occupation: Automobile Dealership Owner; Real Estate Sales Associate; Politician; Sheriff

Frank G. Cousins, Jr. (born May 7, 1958, in Boston, Massachusetts) is an American politician who served as the Essex County, Massachusetts Sheriff. Cousins became the first African-American sheriff in Massachusetts when he was appointed to the position in 1996 by then Massachusetts Governor William Weld.

Prior to his appointment to sheriff, Cousins had served on the Newburyport, Massachusetts City Council, and then in the Massachusetts House of Representatives from 1993 up until he became sheriff. As a Republican, Cousins has won elections for the sheriff position in 1998, 2004, and 2010 in heavily Democratic Essex County. He did not run for reelection in 2016.
