= James Kelcourse =

American politician

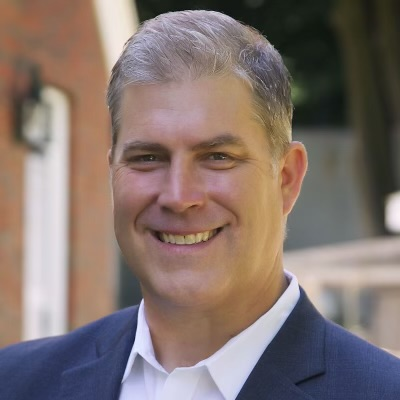

Member of the Massachusetts Parole Board
- Incumbent
- Assumed office June 29, 2022

Member of the Massachusetts House of Representatives from the 1st Essex district
- In office January 7, 2015 – June 29, 2022
- Preceded by: Michael A. Costello
- Succeeded by: Dawne Shand

City Councilor At-Large for Amesbury, Massachusetts
- In office 2010–2014

Personal details
- Born: James M. Kelcourse; January 21, 1974 (age 52)
- Education: Amesbury High School; Villanova University (BS, MBA); Massachusetts School of Law (JD)
- Occupation: Attorney; Politician; Businessman
- Website: jameskelcourse.com

James Kelcourse is a member of the Massachusetts Parole Board. Kelcourse was previously a member of the Massachusetts House of Representatives. A resident of Amesbury, Massachusetts, he was elected as a Republican to represent the 1st Essex district. Kelcourse, a former Amesbury city councillor, defeated Newburyport city councillor Ed Cameron in a very close election. He was declared the victor by 12 votes after a month-long recount. He was re-elected in 2016, 2018, and 2020. Kelcourse served the cities of Newburyport and Amesbury and the town of Salisbury for 4 terms in the House of Representatives.

In 2012, Kelcourse ran for the Massachusetts State Senate in the 1st Essex district as an unenrolled candidate. He placed last in the general election.

On June 16, 2021, Kelcourse announced his candidacy for Mayor of the City of Amesbury. On November 2, 2021, in Amesbury's Mayoral election, Representative Kelcourse lost to incumbent Mayor Kassandra Gove.

On June 1, 2022, Kelcourse was nominated by Governor Charlie Baker to serve on the state Parole Board. On June 22, his nomination was confirmed by the Massachusetts Governor's Council. He resigned his position as State Representative on June 29, 2022 and was officially sworn in as a member of the Parole Board.

Kelcourse resides in Amesbury with his wife Amanda and their two children. Prior to his appointment to the Parole Board, Kelcourse operated a legal practice in Newburyport, Massachusetts.

== Electoral history ==
First Essex - 2012 State Senate General Election
Party	Candidate	Votes	%
Democratic	Kathleen A. O'Connor Ives	36,405	45.9
Republican	Shaun P. Toohey	26,654	33.6
Unenrolled	Paul A. Magliocchetti	12,870	16.2
Unenrolled	James Kelcourse	3,358	4.2
Write-ins	All others	40	0.1

First Essex - 2014 State Representative Republican Primary
Party	Candidate	Votes	%
Republican	James Kelcourse	1,133	99.7
Write-ins	All others	3	0.3

First Essex - 2014 State Representative General Election
Party	Candidate	Votes	%
Republican	James Kelcourse	6,978	42.0
Democratic	Edward C. Cameron	6,968	42.0
Unenrolled	Ari B. Herzog	1,628	9.8
Unenrolled	Steven J. Stanganeli	791	4.8
Unenrolled	Joseph L. Valianti	231	1.4
Write-ins	All others	2	0

First Essex - 2016 State Representative Republican Primary
Party	Candidate	Votes	%
Republican	James Kelcourse (inc.)	663	100.0

First Essex - 2016 State Representative General Election
Party	Candidate	Votes	%
Republican	James Kelcourse (inc.)	13,272	54.0
Democratic	Brianna Sullivan	11,280	45.9
Write-ins	All others	7	0.1

First Essex - 2018 State Representative Republican Primary
Party	Candidate	Votes	%
Republican	James Kelcourse (inc.)	2,096	99.6
Write-ins	All others	9	0.4

First Essex - 2018 State Representative General Election
Party	Candidate	Votes	%
Republican	James Kelcourse (inc.)	11,384	52.7
Democratic	Jennifer A. Rocco-Runnion	10,219	47.3
Write-ins	All others	5	0.0

First Essex - 2020 State Representative Republican Primary
Party	Candidate	Votes	%
Republican	James Kelcourse (inc.)	2,123	99.7
Write-ins	All others	6	0.3

First Essex - 2020 State Representative General Election
Party	Candidate	Votes	%
Republican	James Kelcourse (inc.)	14,537	51.6
Democratic	Amber Hewett	13,614	48.3
Write-ins	All others	11	0.1

Amesbury Mayoral - 2021 Mayoral General Election
Party	Candidate	Votes	%
Unenrolled	Kassandra Gove (inc.)	3,611	61
Republican	James Kelcourse	2,307	38.9
Write-ins	All others	12	0.1

== See also ==
- 2019–2020 Massachusetts legislature
- 2021–2022 Massachusetts legislature
