= California's 26th senatorial district =

American legislative district

Coordinates: 34.0897°N 118.2439°W

California's 26th State Senate district
Current senator
María Elena Durazo; D–Los Angeles
- Population (2010) • Voting age • Citizen voting age: 927,757; 778,734; 669,916
- Demographics: 64.87% White; 3.96% Black; 13.62% Latino; 15.85% Asian; 0.42% Native American; 0.26% Hawaiian/Pacific Islander; 0.43% other; 0.60% remainder of multiracial
- Registered voters: 666,958
- Registration: 50.55% Democratic; 19.10% Republican; 25.03% No party preference

California's 26th senatorial district is one of 40 California State Senate districts. It is currently represented by Democrat María Elena Durazo of Los Angeles.

== District profile ==
The district is located in the central and eastern Los Angeles neighborhoods of Los Feliz, East Hollywood, Silver Lake, Echo Park, Cypress Park, Koreatown, Wilshire Center, Westlake, Glassell Park, Eagle Rock, Garvanza, Lincoln Heights, Hermon, Little Tokyo, Chinatown, Boyle Heights, and El Sereno, along with the adjacent communities of City Terrace, East Los Angeles, and Vernon.

== Election results from statewide races ==
Year	Office	Results
2020	President	Biden 72.3 – 25.8%
2018	Governor	Newsom 72.1 – 27.9%
2018	Senator	Feinstein 62.4 – 37.6%
2016	President	Clinton 71.4 – 23.0%
2016	Senator	Harris 72.1 – 27.9%
2014	Governor	Brown 65.4 – 34.6%
2012	President	Obama 64.9 – 32.3%
2012	Senator	Feinstein 68.4 – 31.6%

== List of senators representing the district ==
Due to redistricting, the 26th district has been moved around different parts of the state. The current iteration resulted from the 2021 redistricting by the California Citizens Redistricting Commission.

=== 1861–1869: two seats ===
Years	Seat A			Seat B			Counties represented
Years	Member	Party	Electoral history	Member	Party	Electoral history	Counties represented
January 7, 1861 – January 6, 1862	R. C. Gaskill	Republican	Elected in 1861. Re-elected in 1862. [data missing]	Richard Irwin	Union; Democratic	Elected in 1861. [data missing]	Butte
January 6, 1862 – December 6, 1863	R. C. Gaskill	Republican	Elected in 1861. Re-elected in 1862. [data missing]	Thomas B. Shannon	Union	Elected in 1862. [data missing]	Butte
December 6, 1863 – December 4, 1865	F. M. Smith	Union	Elected in 1863. Re-elected in 1865. [data missing]	Second seat was eliminated for the term.			Butte, Plumas
December 6, 1863 – December 4, 1865	F. M. Smith	Union	Elected in 1863. Re-elected in 1865. [data missing]	Second seat was eliminated for the term.			Butte, Lassen, Plumas
December 4, 1865 – December 2, 1867	F. M. Smith	Union	Elected in 1863. Re-elected in 1865. [data missing]	Seneca Ewer	Union	Elected in 1865. Re-elected in 1867. [data missing]	Butte
December 2, 1867 – December 6, 1869	John Conly	Union	Elected in 1867. [data missing]	Seneca Ewer	Union	Elected in 1865. Re-elected in 1867. [data missing]	Butte

=== 1868–1877: one seat ===
Senators	Party	Years served	Electoral history	Counties represented
George C. Perkins (Oakland)	Republican	December 6, 1869 – December 4, 1871	Elected in 1868. [data missing]	Butte
David Boucher (Dayton)	Republican	December 4, 1871 – September 16, 1872	Elected in 1871. Died.	Butte, Lassen, Plumas
George C. Perkins (Oakland)	Republican	November 5, 1872 – December 1, 1873	Elected to finish Boucher's term. [data missing]	Butte, Lassen, Plumas
[data missing]		December 1, 1873 – December 6, 1875	[data missing]	Butte, Lassen, Plumas
William C. Hendricks (Oroville)	Republican	December 6, 1875 – December 3, 1877	Redistricted from the 24th district and re-elected in 1875. [data missing]	Butte
William C. Hendricks (Oroville)	Republican	December 6, 1875 – December 3, 1877	Redistricted from the 24th district and re-elected in 1875. [data missing]	Butte, Lassen, Plumas

=== 1877–1881: two seats ===
Years	Seat A			Seat B			Counties represented
Years	Member	Party	Electoral history	Member	Party	Electoral history	Counties represented
December 3, 1877 – January 5, 1880	John C. Coleman (Grass Valley)	Democratic	Elected in 1877. [data missing]	Niles Searls (Nevada)	Democratic	Elected in 1877. [data missing]	Nevada
January 5, 1880 – May 26, 1881	William George (Grass Valley)	Republican	Elected in 1879. Redistricted to the single-member district.	B. J. Watson (Nevada)	Republican	Elected in 1879. Resigned.	Nevada, Sierra
May 26, 1881 – January 3, 1881	William George (Grass Valley)	Republican	Elected in 1879. Redistricted to the single-member district.	Vacant			Nevada, Sierra

=== 1881–present: one seat ===
Senators	Party	Years served	Electoral history	Counties represented
William George (Grass Valley)	Republican	January 3, 1881 – January 8, 1882	Redistricted from the multi-member district and re-elected in 1880. [data missing]	Nevada, Sierra
W. W. Kellogg (Quincy)	Democratic	January 8, 1882 – January 3, 1887	Elected in 1882. [data missing]	Butte, Lassen, Plumas
Thomas H. McDonald (San Francisco)	Democratic	January 3, 1887 – January 5, 1891	Elected in 1886. [data missing]	San Francisco
John T. Broderick (San Francisco)	Republican	January 5, 1891 – January 2, 1893	Elected in 1890. Redistricted to the 20th district.	San Francisco
Vacant		January 2, 1893 – January 7, 1895		San Francisco
Eli S. Denison (Oakland)	Republican	January 7, 1895 – July 7, 1898	Elected in 1894. [data missing]	Alameda
Frank W. Leavitt (Oakland)	Republican	January 2, 1899 – January 5, 1903	Elected in 1898. [data missing]	Alameda
Chester Rowell (Fresno)	Republican	January 5, 1903 – January 7, 1907	Redistricted from the 16th district and re-elected in 1902. [data missing]	Fresno
George W. Cartwright (Fresno)	Democratic	January 7, 1907 – January 4, 1915	Elected in 1906. Re-elected in 1910. [data missing]	Fresno
W. F. Chandler (Fresno)	Progressive	January 4, 1915 – January 6, 1919	Elected in 1914. [data missing]	Fresno
M. B. Harris (Fresno)	Republican	January 6, 1919 – January 3, 1927	Elected in 1918. Re-elected in 1922. [data missing]	Fresno
Charles H. Cobb (Fresno)	Democratic	January 3, 1927 – January 5, 1931	Elected in 1926. [data missing]	Fresno
Dan E. Williams (Big Pine)	Republican	January 5, 1931 – January 2, 1939	Elected in 1930. Re-elected in 1934. [data missing]	Calaveras, Mariposa, Tuolumne
Jesse M. Mayo (Angels Camp)	Republican	January 2, 1939 – March 11, 1953	Elected in 1938. Re-elected in 1942. Re-elected in 1946. Re-elected in 150. Died.	Calaveras, Mariposa, Tuolumne
Vacant		March 11, 1953 – July 1, 1953		Calaveras, Mariposa, Tuolumne
Stephen P. Teale (Rail Road Flat)	Democratic	July 1, 1953 – January 2, 1967	Elected to finish Mayo's term. Re-elected in 1954. Re-elected in 1958. Re-elected in 1962. Redistricted to the 3rd district.	Calaveras, Mariposa, Tuolumne
Anthony Beilenson (Los Angeles)	Democratic	January 2, 1967 – November 30, 1974	Elected in 1966. Re-elected in 1970. Redistricted to the 22nd district.	Los Angeles
Alfred H. Song (Monterey Park)	Democratic	December 2, 1974 – November 30, 1978	Redistricted from the 28th district and re-elected in 1974. Lost re-election.	Los Angeles
Joseph B. Montoya (La Puenta)	Democratic	December 4, 1978 – February 9, 1990	Elected in 1978. Re-elected in 1982. Re-elected in 1986. Resigned after being indicted due to the BRISPEC sting operation.	Los Angeles
Vacant		February 9, 1990 – April 16, 1990		Los Angeles
Charles Calderon (Montebello)	Democratic	April 16, 1990 – November 30, 1994	Elected to finish Montoya's term Re-elected in 1990. Redistricted to the 30th district.	Los Angeles
Diane Watson (Los Angeles)	Democratic	December 5, 1994 – November 30, 1998	Redistricted from the 28th district and re-elected in 1994. Retired due to term limits.	Los Angeles
Kevin Murray (Los Angeles)	Democratic	December 7, 1998 – November 30, 2006	Elected in 1998. Re-elected in 2002. Retired due to term limits.	Los Angeles
Mark Ridley-Thomas (Los Angeles)	Democratic	December 4, 2006 – November 30, 2008	Elected in 2006. Retired to become a member of the Los Angeles County Board of Supervisors.	Los Angeles
Vacant		November 30, 2008 – June 8, 2009		Los Angeles
Curren Price (Los Angeles)	Democratic	June 8, 2009 – July 1, 2013	Elected to finish Ridley-Thomas's term. Re-elected in 2010. Resigned to become a member of the Los Angeles City Council.	Los Angeles
Vacant		July 1, 2013 – September 26, 2013		Los Angeles
Holly Mitchell (Los Angeles)	Democratic	September 26, 2013 – November 30, 2014	Elected to finish Price's term. Redistricted to the 30th district.	Los Angeles
Ben Allen (Malibu)	Democratic	December 1, 2014 – November 30, 2022	Elected in 2014. Re-elected in 2018. Redistricted to the 24th district.	Los Angeles
María Elena Durazo (Los Angeles)	Democratic	December 5, 2022 – present	Redistricted from the 24th district and re-elected in 2022. Retiring to run for Los Angeles County Board of Supervisors.	Los Angeles

== Election results (1990-present) ==
=== 2022 ===
2022 California State Senate 26th district election
Primary election
Party	Candidate	Votes	%
Democratic	Maria Elena Durazo (incumbent)	108,999	99.6
Republican	Claudia Agraz (write-in)	425	0.4
Total votes		109,424	100.0
General election
Democratic	Maria Elena Durazo (incumbent)	155,727	82.9
Republican	Claudia Agraz	32,022	17.1
Total votes		187,749	100.0
Democratic hold			

=== 2018 ===
2018 California State Senate 26th district election
Primary election
Party	Candidate	Votes	%
Democratic	Ben Allen (incumbent)	144,283	76.8
No party preference	Baron Bruno	23,119	12.3
Libertarian	Mark Matthew Herd	20,534	10.9
Total votes		187,936	100.0
General election
Democratic	Ben Allen (incumbent)	298,609	77.2
No party preference	Baron Bruno	87,974	22.8
Total votes		386,583	100.0
Democratic hold			

=== 2014 ===
2014 California State Senate 26th district election
Primary election
Party	Candidate	Votes	%
Democratic	Ben Allen	25,987	22.2
Democratic	Sandra Fluke	22,759	19.4
No party preference	Seth Stodder	20,419	17.4
Democratic	Betsy Butler	19,301	16.5
Democratic	Amy Howorth	18,411	15.7
Democratic	Vito Imbasciani	5,189	4.4
Democratic	Patric Verrone	3,446	2.9
Democratic	Barbi S. Appelquist	1,630	1.4
Total votes		117,142	100.0
General election
Democratic	Ben Allen	122,901	60.3
Democratic	Sandra Fluke	80,781	39.7
Total votes		203,682	100.0
Democratic hold			

=== 2013 (special) ===
2013 California State Senate 26th district special election Vacancy resulting from the resignation of Curren Price
Party	Candidate	Votes	%
Democratic	Holly Mitchell	19,481	81.0
Democratic	Mervin Evans	4,579	19.0
Total votes		24,060	100.0
Democratic hold			

=== 2010 ===
2010 California State Senate 26th district election
Party	Candidate	Votes	%
Democratic	Curren Price (incumbent)	151,733	81.3
Republican	Nachum Shifren	25,728	13.8
Libertarian	Bob Weber	4,882	2.6
Peace and Freedom	Cindy Varela Henderson	4,293	2.3
Total votes		186,636	100.0
Democratic hold			

=== 2009 (special) ===
2009 California State Senate 26th district special election Vacancy resulting from the resignation of Mark Ridley-Thomas
Primary election
Party	Candidate	Votes	%
Democratic	Curren Price	10,864	35.8
Democratic	Mike Davis	6,471	21.6
Democratic	Robert Cole	4,160	13.7
Republican	Nachum Schifren	3,371	11.1
Democratic	Johnathan Friedman	2,497	8.2
Democratic	Saundra Davis	2,262	7.5
Peace and Freedom	Cindy Varela Henderson	525	1.7
Democratic	Mervin Leon Evans	165	0.5
Total votes		30,015	100.0
General election
Democratic	Curren Price	37,677	70.7
Republican	Nachum Schifren	11,097	20.8
Peace and Freedom	Cindy Varela Henderson	4,501	8.4
Total votes		53,275	100.0
Democratic hold			

=== 2006 ===
2006 California State Senate 26th district election
Party	Candidate	Votes	%
Democratic	Mark Ridley-Thomas	133,309	89.1
Libertarian	Bud Raymond	16,317	10.9
Total votes		149,626	100.0
Democratic hold			

=== 2002 ===
2002 California State Senate 26th district election
Party	Candidate	Votes	%
Democratic	Kevin Murray (incumbent)	123,814	100.0
Total votes		123,814	100.0
Democratic hold			

=== 1998 ===
1998 California State Senate 26th district election
Party	Candidate	Votes	%
Democratic	Kevin Murray	124,328	88.4
Republican	Mac Lane Key	12,798	9.1
Libertarian	Bob Weber	3,460	2.5
Total votes		140,586	100.0
Democratic hold			

=== 1994 ===
1994 California State Senate 26th district election
Party	Candidate	Votes	%
Democratic	Diane Watson (incumbent)	117,204	82.9
Republican	Joe Piechowski	19,245	13.6
Libertarian	Bob Weber	3,042	2.2
Peace and Freedom	Wassin A. Snededdin	1,845	1.3
Total votes		141,336	100.0
Democratic hold			

=== 1990 ===
1990 California State Senate 26th district election
Party	Candidate	Votes	%
Democratic	Charles Calderon	60,801	62.8
Republican	Joe Aguilar Urguidi	30,984	32.0
Libertarian	Kim Goldsworthy	5,055	5.2
Total votes		96,840	100.0
Democratic hold			

=== 1990 (special) ===
1990 California State Senate 26th district special election Vacancy resulting from the resignation of Joseph B. Montoya
Party	Candidate	Votes	%
Democratic	Charles Calderon	22,857	68.1
Republican	Joe Aguilar Urguidi	9,098	27.1
Libertarian	Kim Goldsworthy	1,601	4.8
No party	Richard Gonzales	6	0.0
Total votes		33,562	100.0
Democratic hold			

== See also ==
- California State Senate
- California State Senate districts
- Districts in California
