= Charles Reardon =

American politician

Sheriff of Essex County, Massachusetts
- In office October 4, 1978 – September 17, 1996
- Preceded by: Robert Ellis Cahill
- Succeeded by: Frank Cousins

Personal details
- Born: c. 1942
- Party: Democratic

Charles H. Reardon (born c. 1942) is a former American penal official who served as sheriff of Essex County, Massachusetts from 1978 to 1996.

Reardon began working in the Essex County penal and court system in 1964. He also owned a portion of Essex Process Servers, a private process serving business until 1978. He was appointed sheriff of Essex County by Governor Michael Dukakis on October 4, 1978 following the resignation of Robert Ellis Cahill due to heart problems. He was elected to a full term in 1980 and reelected in 1986 and 1992.

In 1994, federal authorities began investigating Reardon for allegedly providing a no-show job to one of his fund-raisers and for failing to return a savings bond to a deceased prisoner's family. In 1995, Reardon's top aide, his director of communications, and the Essex County Jail personnel director were indicted on charges of wiretapping and eavesdropping, another top deputy pled guilty to embezzling $6,400 from the county, and the former county administrator of civil process servers was indicted for lying to a federal grand jury investigating Reardon.

On January 18, 1996, Reardon was indicted by a federal grand jury on charges of conspiracy, accepting corrupt payments, misusing public facilities, wiretapping, and obstructing justice. According to the indictment, Reardon solicited bribes from process servers, used the Middleton jail as the base for his campaign's direct-mail operation, directed subordinates to eavesdrop on employees to determine their loyalty to him, and used the state police computer system to gather damaging information on political opponents. Reardon agree to an unpaid suspension on January 23. On September 17, he resigned and pleaded guilty to accepting gratuities worth $3,600 from Essex Process Servers Inc. The other charges were dropped as part of the plea agreement. He was sentenced to a year and a day in federal prison.
