= Paul Tirone =

American politician (1951–2024)

Member of the Massachusetts House of Representatives from the 1st Essex District
- In office 2001–2003
- Preceded by: Kevin L. Finnegan
- Succeeded by: Michael A. Costello

Personal details
- Born: February 8, 1951 Newburyport, Massachusetts
- Died: April 14, 2024 (aged 73)
- Party: Democratic
- Education: Northern Michigan University; Northeastern University
- Occupation: Politician

Paul Edward Tirone (February 8, 1951 – April 14, 2024) was an American politician who was a member of the Massachusetts House of Representatives from 2001 to 2003. He was defeated in the 2002 Democratic primary by Michael A. Costello.

Tirone was involved in exonerating the remaining yet-unnamed five victims of the Salem witch trials, by helping pass an act on October 31, 2001. His wife is a descendant of Sarah Wildes, one of the condemned witches who was hanged in 1692. He took the opportunity to urge caution on a similar reaction to the then-recent September 11 attacks, stating, "Sometimes when things like this happen we need to take a breath, and look at it. We just can't paint blame with a wide brush."
