= David Roberti =

American politician

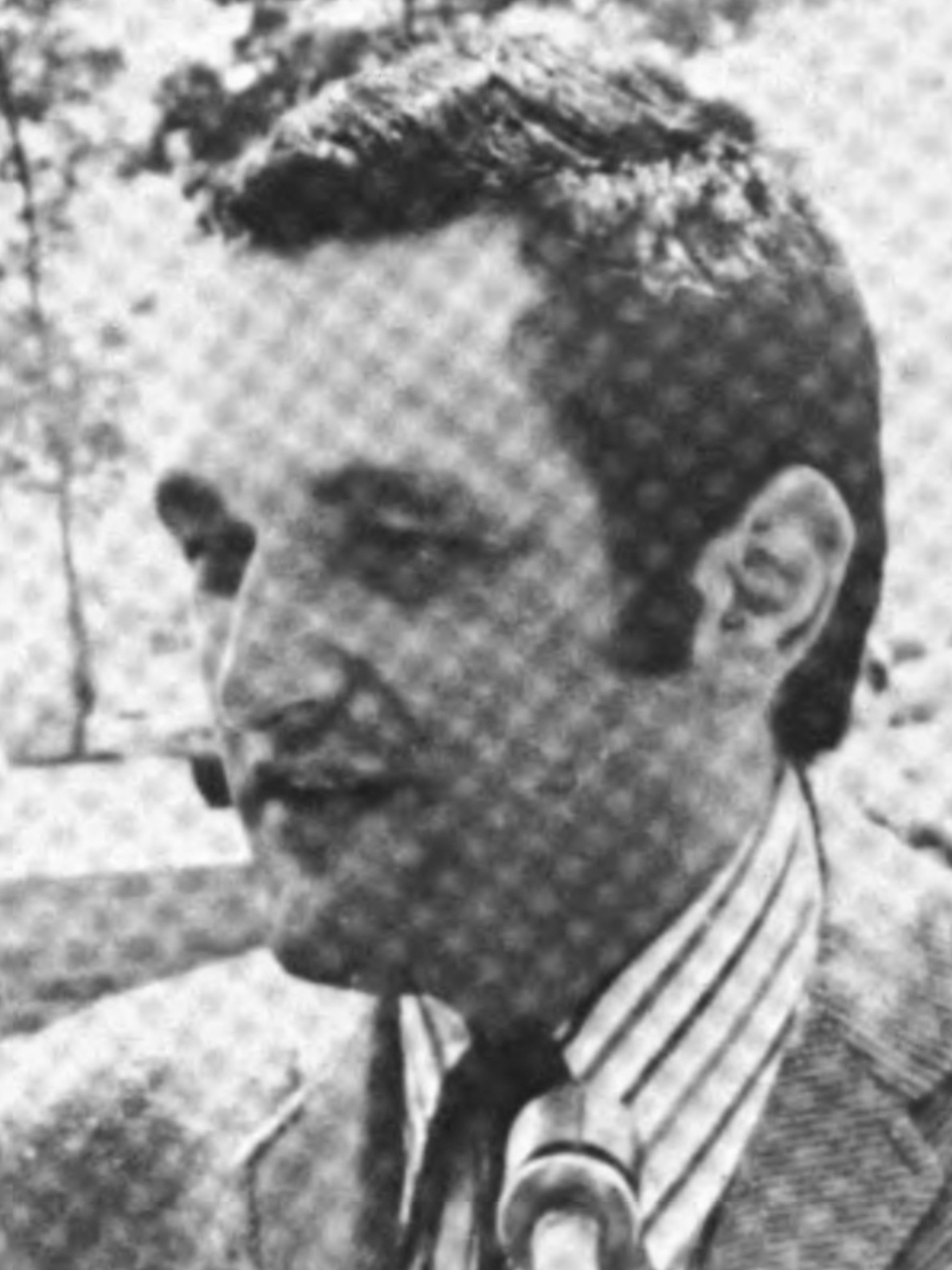
- Roberti in 1971

Member of the California State Senate
- In office July 2, 1992 – November 30, 1994
- Preceded by: Alan Robbins
- Succeeded by: Herschel Rosenthal
- Constituency: 20th district
- In office July 29, 1971 – July 2, 1992
- Preceded by: George E. Danielson
- Succeeded by: Tom Hayden
- Constituency: 27th district (1971–1976); 23rd district (1976–1992)

Member of the California State Assembly from the 48th district
- In office January 2, 1967 – July 29, 1971
- Preceded by: George E. Danielson
- Succeeded by: Bill Brophy

Personal details
- Born: May 4, 1939 (age 87) Los Angeles, California
- Party: Democratic
- Spouse: June Roberti

David A. Roberti (born May 4, 1939) is an American politician who served as a Senator in the California legislature and as President pro tempore of the California State Senate from 1981 to 1993. He co-authored the Roberti-Roos gun control act. In April 1994 he was the subject of a failed recall attempt propelled by the gun lobby, in a special election.

== Career ==
From 1964 to 1965, Roberti was a Clerk for the District Court of Appeals. In 1965, he became a state Deputy Attorney General. After serving 28 years in the state legislature, he became Member, California Integrated Waste Management Board, serving from 1998 to 2002.

== Elections ==
In 1966, he was elected to the California Assembly, in District 48, serving until he ran to fill an open California State Senate seat in District 27, winning on July 20, 1971, and resigning his Assembly seat on July 29. In 1976, he won the senate seat in District 23, and became the Majority Leader. In 1980, he became the President pro Tempore, serving until 1994. In 1991, he resigned his District 23 seat on July 2, 1992, to take the District 20 seat, due to redistricting and the resignation of Alan Robbins. In so doing, he became the first legislator subject to the new term limits law. In 1993, Roberti was the target of a recall precipitated by his co-authorship of gun control legislation in 1989. It was the first recall attempt in the state in 79 years. The recall effort was led by William A. Dominguez, John R. Vernon, Hans Rusche, Dolores White, and Glenn C. Bailey. The recall qualified for the ballot but failed (40.75% in favor; 59.25% opposed). In 1994 he was a primary candidate for state Treasurer, losing with 44.5% of the vote. His loss was attributed to the immense campaign costs involved in defending himself against the recall, which exhausted his campaign treasury. Upon leaving the legislature, he returned to the practice of law. In 2001, he ran in a primary to replace a deceased member of the Los Angeles City Council, narrowly missing the runner up, primary slot, with 17.5% of the vote.
