= Joseph B. Montoya =

American politician (1939–2022)

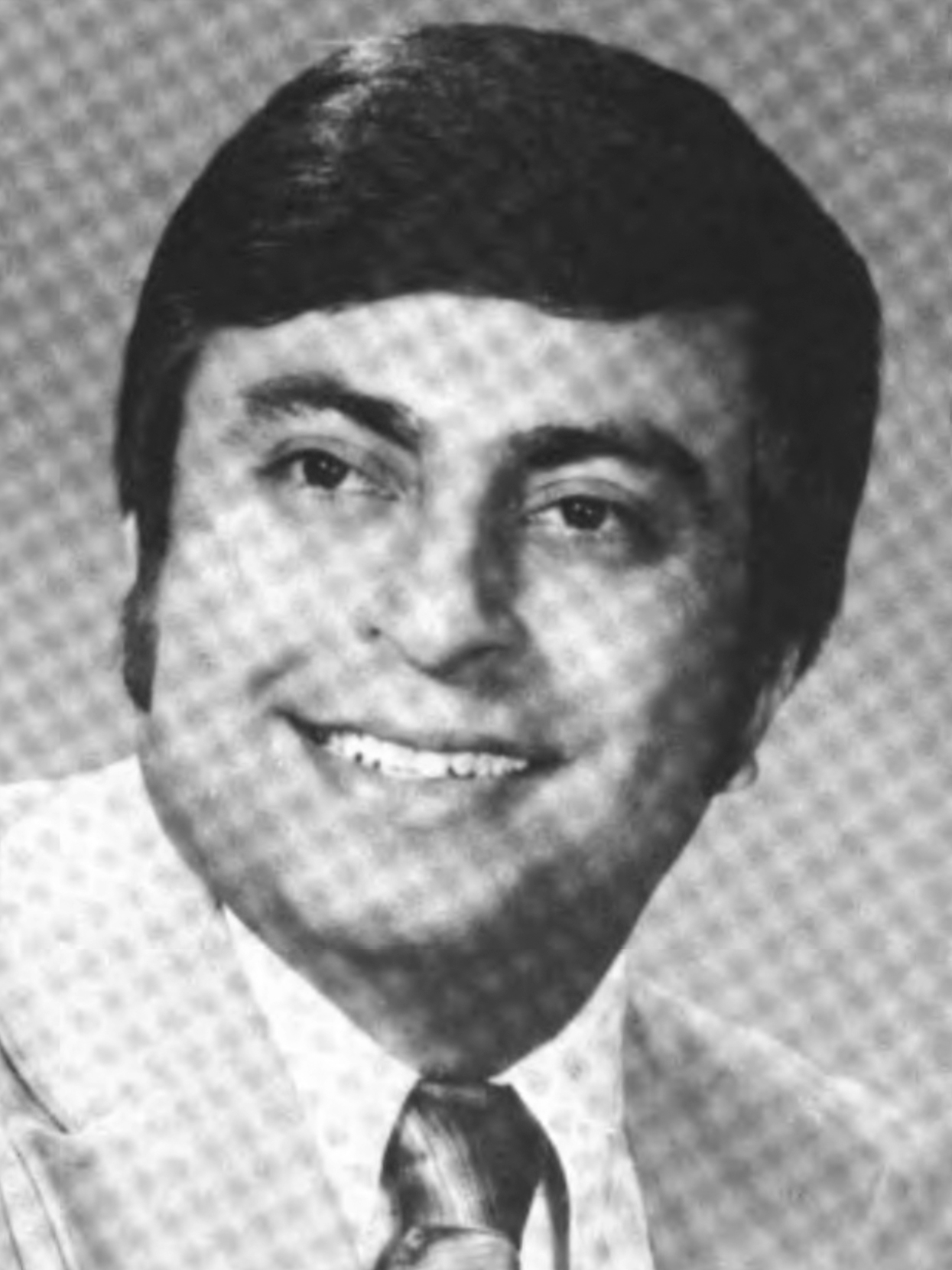
- Official portrait, 1975

Member of the California State Senate from the 26th district
- In office December 4, 1978 – February 9, 1990
- Preceded by: Alfred H. Song
- Succeeded by: Charles Calderon

Member of the California State Assembly
- In office January 8, 1973 – November 30, 1978
- Preceded by: William Campbell
- Succeeded by: Sally Tanner
- Constituency: 50th district (1973–1974); 60th district (1977–1978)

Personal details
- Born: April 30, 1939 Rocky Ford, Colorado, U.S.
- Died: June 21, 2022 (aged 83) Sacramento, California, U.S.
- Party: Democratic
- Spouse(s): Pilar Gonzalez; Rita Stephenson
- Children: 4

Joseph Bernardino Montoya Jr. (April 30, 1939 – June 21, 2022) was an American politician who served in the California State Legislature from 1973 to 1990. He served in the State Assembly from 1973 to 1978 from 50th and 60th districts, and in the California State Senate from the 26th district from 1978 until his resignation in 1990. Prior to that, he was a member of the La Puente City Council and served as Mayor of La Puente.

His political career was cut short due to Montoya being indicted on the BRISPEC sting operation, and he was convicted of extortion, money laundering, and racketeering. He was imprisoned for five years, being released in 1995.

== Early life and career ==
Montoya was born on April 30, 1939, in Rocky Ford, Colorado to Joseph and Rosalia Maria Montoya. When he was a teenager, his family moved to California, where he attended and graduated from La Puente High School and later the University of California, Los Angeles after serving four years in the United States Air Force.

== Political career ==
In 1968, he was elected to the La Puente City Council, serving until his election to the State Assembly. In 1970, Montoya ran for California State Assembly for the 50th district against incumbent William Campbell, and was endorsed by the Congress of Mexican American Unity. He lost the election, but two years later due to redistricting, the seat was now vacant. He won the election narrowly against his opponent, Kieth W. Miller, in 1972.

In 1978, Montoya announced that he would be challenging incumbent Alfred H. Song for the Democratic nomination for State Senate, using an investigation into Song by the Federal Bureau of Investigation for political corruption. Running as a "good government" candidate, Montoya defeated Song and won the Democratic nomination for State Senate in the 26th district.

Montoya got caught up in the BRISPEC sting operation and was convicted of all but three counts. He was pressured to resign in order to avoid an expulsion from Senate. On February 5, 1990, the Senate Rules Committee stripped him of his committee memberships and gave him the deadline of February 8 to resign; he resigned on February 9, saying in a speech that he would be cleared of the charges. He was sentenced to six-and-a-half years in prison. In 1991, the Court of Appeals reversed the conviction of Montoya on five of the seven counts. The Court did not ask for Montoya to be released, but instead asked to reduce his sentence. He was released from prison in 1995.

== Personal life ==
Montoya married Pilar Gonzalez in 1960, with the couple living in La Puente. He later married Rita Stephenson. Montoya had four children and one stepchild. He died in Sacramento, California on June 21, 2022.
