= BRISPEC sting operation =

The Bribery and Special Interest (BRISPEC) sting operation was a sting operation conducted by the Federal Bureau of Investigation that investigated corruption in the California State Legislature from 1986 to 1988. The operation, later known as Shrimpscam in the press, involved setting up dummy companies by the FBI. The FBI set up a West Sacramento-based shrimp processing company. Then the fake companies lobbied for special-interest legislative bills favoring themselves. In addition, money was offered to legislators to see if any of them could be bribed in return for their support. A couple of the bills were actually passed by both the Assembly and Senate, but were vetoed by Governor George Deukmejian, who was tipped off in advance.

The operation resulted in the conviction and imprisonment of 12 public officials, among them were five state elected officials, including Board of Equalization Member Paul B. Carpenter (D), State Senators Joseph B. Montoya (D), Alan Robbins (D), and Frank C. Hill (R), and Assemblyman Pat Nolan (R). In addition, Coastal Commissioner Mark L. Nathanson, insurance lobbyist Clayton R. Jackson and several legislative aides were also convicted in connection with the operation.

Speaker Willie Brown (D) and Assemblymember Gwen Moore (D) were also targeted by the operation, but emerged unscathed. Brown had a $1,000 campaign contribution shoved under his door returned to the donor. As a former member of the National Guard, this has led to accusations over the years that Brown was a federal informant and used his influence with the FBI to target his political opponents with process crime entrapment. Moore's office was raided as part of the sting operation, but she was eventually acquitted of any wrongdoing.

Pardon of Patrick Nolan by President Donald Trump.

Nolan was eventually pardoned by President Donald Trump on May 15, 2019.
