= List of sheriffs of Essex County, Massachusetts =

This is a list of sheriffs of Essex County, Massachusetts. In the earliest days of the county, the office of sheriff was called the marshall. Since 1692, the office has been called the sheriff. The sheriff originally was an appointed office; it has been an elected position since 1856. The sheriff is elected to serve a six-year term.

The current Essex County sheriff is Kevin Coppinger.

Sheriff	Picture	Term	Party	Note
George Corwin		1692–1696		
William Gedney		1696–1702		
Thomas Wainwright		1702		
William Gedney				
Daniel Denison		1708–1710		
William Gedney		1710–1715		
John Denison		1715–1722		
John Denison		July 3, 1722 – December 12, 1728		Joint sheriff of Essex County with Benjamin Marston from July 3, 1722, to December 12, 1728.
Benjamin Marston		July 3, 1722, – December 12, 1728		Joint sheriff of Essex County with John Denison from July 3, 1722, to December 12, 1728.
Benjamin Marston		December 12, 1728 – January 24, 1745–46		Joint sheriff of Essex County with John Denison from July 3, 1722, to December 12, 1728.
Robert Hale		1746–1766		
Richard Saltonstall		1766–1779		
Michael Farley		1779–1792		
Bailey Bartlett		1792–1831		
Joseph E. Sprague		1831–1852		
Frederick Robinson		1852–1854	Republican	
Thomas E. Payson		1854–1856	Whig	
James Cary		1856–1866		
Horatio G. Herrick		1866–1893	Republican	
Samuel A. Johnson		1893–1919	Republican	Died in office.
Patrick F. Tierney		1919–1921		
Arthur G. Wells		1921–1932	Republican	Died in office.
Frank E. Raymond		1932–1953	Republican	
Earl Wells		1953–1964	Republican	Died in office. Succeeded by his son.
Roger E. Wells		1964	Republican	Acting
William J. Casey		1964–1965	Democratic	Appointed by Gov. Endicott Peabody
Roger E. Wells		1964–1975	Republican	
Robert Ellis Cahill		1975–1978	Democratic	Resigned after he suffered a heart attack and stroke.
Charles Reardon		1978–1996	Democratic	Resigned after pleading guilty to corruption charges.
Frank G. Cousins, Jr		1996–2017	Republican	Appointed in 1996 by Massachusetts Governor William Weld.
Kevin Coppinger		2017–present	Democratic	
