= Alan Robbins =

American politician (born 1943)

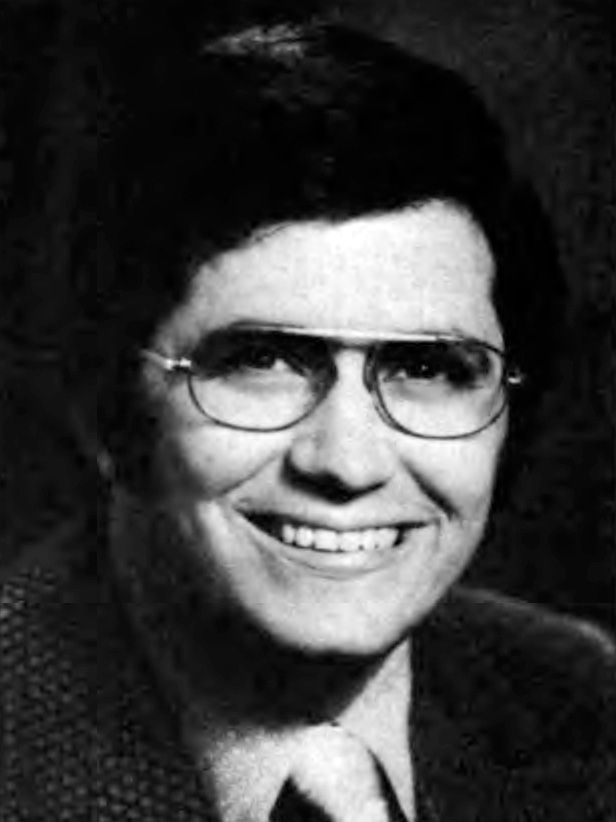
- Official portrait, 1975

Member of the California State Senate
- In office March 2, 1973 – November 19, 1991
- Preceded by: Tom C. Carrell
- Succeeded by: David Roberti
- Constituency: 22nd district (1973–1974); 20th district (1974–1991)

Personal details
- Born: February 5, 1943 (age 83) Philadelphia, Pennsylvania, U.S.
- Party: Democratic
- Spouse: Miriam Elbaum
- Children: 2
- Education: University of California, Los Angeles (B.A., J.D.)
- Occupation: Lawyer, politician

Alan Robbins (born February 5, 1943) is a former American politician in the state of California. Robbins is most noted for his arrest and conviction on racketeering charges and serving five years in a federal prison.

== Early life and education ==
On February 5, 1945, Robbins was born in Philadelphia, Pennsylvania. He was Jewish. In 1949, Robbins' family moved to Southern California. Robbins attended North Hollywood High School. In 1963, Robbins graduated with a Bachelor's degree in political science from the University of California, Los Angeles. In 1966, Robbins earned his Juris Doctor degree from UCLA School of Law.

== Career ==
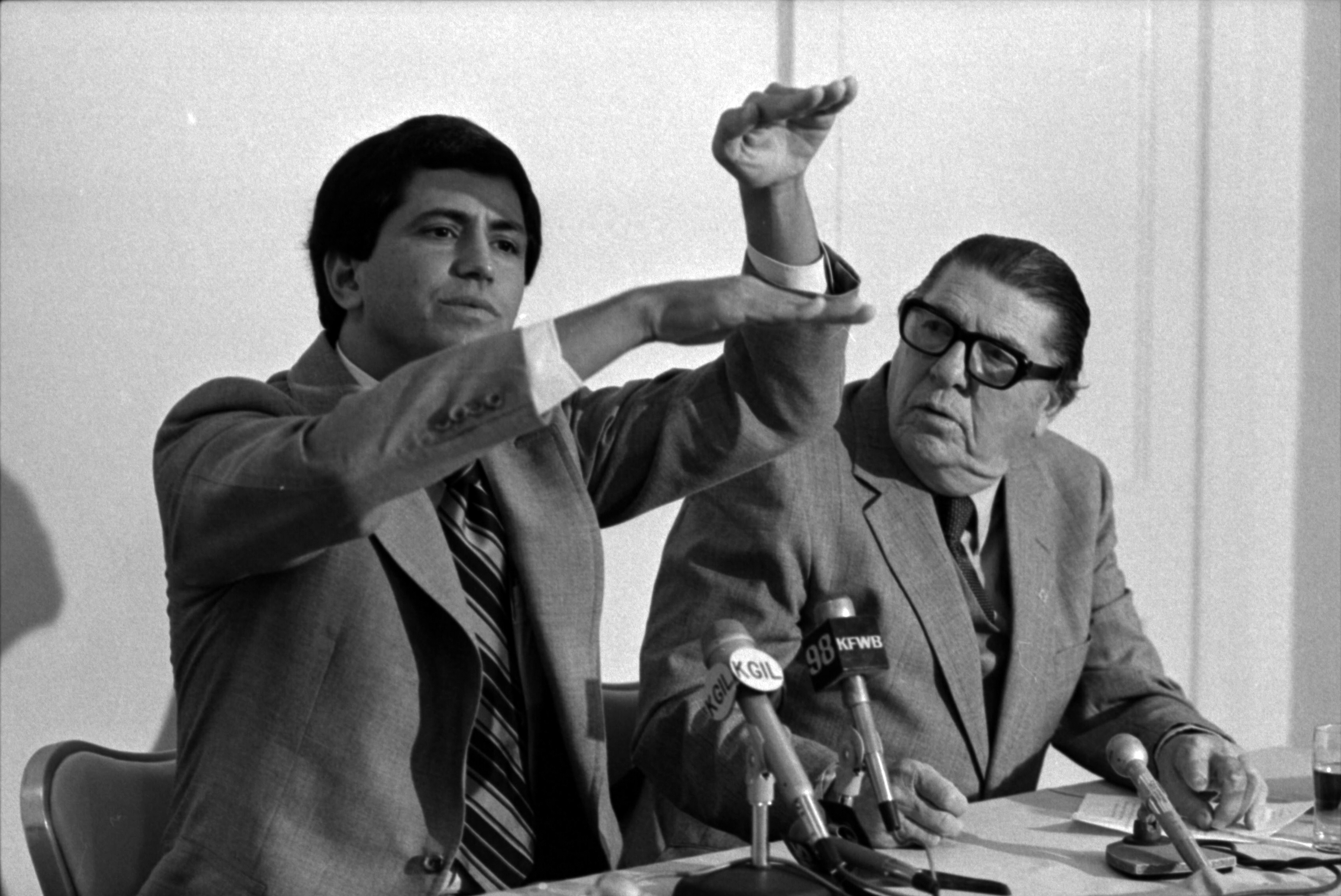
Robbins with Howard Jarvis in 1979.

In 1966 at age 23, Robbins was admitted to the State Bar of California. In 1967, Robbins served in the California Army National Guard. In 1968, Robbins served in the United States Naval Reserve. He practiced real estate law in Los Angeles, California and served as California State Senator from 1974 to 1991. On November 20, 1991, Robbins resigned from the California State Senate.

== Federal crime ==
Robbins pleaded guilty to federal racketeering and income tax evasion charges in connection with the Shrimpscam scandal, and was sentenced to five years in federal prison on May 2, 1992.

Robbins served his time in a federal prison in Lompoc, California. Robbins was released after 18 months in federal prison, although his sentence was five years. Robbins spent another two months in a half-way house.

== Personal life ==
Robbins' ex-wife is Miriam Elbaum. Miriam Elbaum's father was Nate Elbaum. Robbins has two children, Jacob Robbins and Leah Robbins.

While Robbins was serving time in prison, his Encino home was rented to Ted Titmas. In the late 1990s, Robbins resides in Westwood neighborhood of Los Angeles, California.

== See also ==
- 1990 California State Senate election
- BRISPEC sting operation (Shrimpscam)
- Jewish United Fund
