= 2026 United States House of Representatives elections in California (districts 1–26) =

- November 3, 2026

All 52 California seats to the United States House of Representatives
- Reporting: 83.0% as of Nov 10 at 10:12 AM PST
	Majority party	Minority party	Third party
Party	Democratic	Republican	Independent
Last election	43	9	0
Seats before	43	8	1
Seats after	48	4	0
Seat change	▲5	▼4	▼1
Popular vote	7,645,126	3,232,011	76,313
Percentage	69.80%	29.51%	0.70%

Democratic hold Democratic gain
Republican hold
Democratic
50–60%
60–70%
70–80%
80–90%
90–100%
Republican
50–60%
60–70%
70–80%
90–100%

Passed map under California Proposition 50 (effective 2027–2033 starting with the 2026 elections) Interactive map version

The 2026 United States House of Representatives elections in California were held on November 3, 2026, to elect the 52 U.S. representatives from the State of California, one from each of the state's congressional districts. The elections coincided with other elections to the House of Representatives, elections to the United States Senate, and various state and local elections. The passage of Proposition 50 in 2025 significantly altered many districts. The primary elections took place on June 2, 2026.

== Overview ==
United States House of Representatives elections in California, 2026 primary election — June 2, 2026
Party	Votes	Percentage	Candidates	Advancing to general	Seats contesting
Democratic	5,633,898	63.83	154	59	51
Republican	3,036,585	34.40	96	44	43
No party preference	136,016	1.54	32	1	1
Peace and Freedom	8,764	0.10	2	0	0
Libertarian	8,725	0.10	4	0	0
Green	2,352	0.03	1	0	0
Total	8,826,340	100.00	289	104	—

United States House of Representatives elections in California, 2026 General election — November 3, 2026
Party	Votes	Percentage	Seats before	Seats after	+/–
Democratic	7,645,126	69.80%	43	48	▲5
Republican	3,232,011	29.51%	8	4	▼4
No party preference	76,313	0.70%	1	0	▼1
Totals	10,953,450	100.00%	52	52	—

== District 1 ==
2026 California's 1st congressional district election
- Reporting: 69% as of Nov 10 at 10:12 AM PST
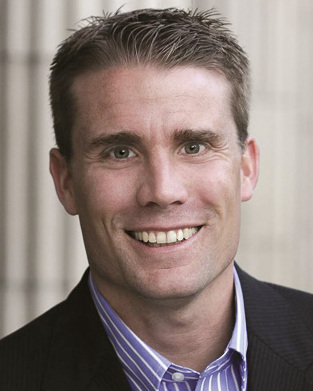

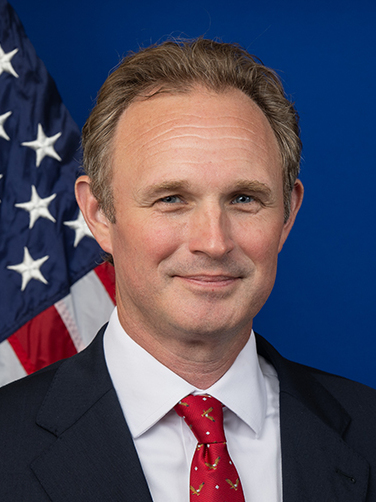
Candidate	Mike McGuire	James Gallagher
Party	Democratic	Republican
Popular vote	114,640	88,475
Percentage	56.4%	43.6%
- McGuire: 50–60% 60–70% 70–80% Gallagher: 50–60% 60–70% 70–80%
U.S. representative before election
James Gallagher
Republican
Elected U.S. representative
Mike McGuire
Democratic

California's 1st congressional district boundary from the 2026 elections Interactive map version

The incumbent was Republican James Gallagher, who won a special election to finish the term of Republican Doug LaMalfa. The special election, using the electoral boundaries pre-Proposition 50, was held on June 2, 2026. Following redistricting, Democrat Mike McGuire defeated James Gallagher in the general election.

=== Primary ===
==== Advanced to general ====
- James Gallagher (Republican), incumbent U.S. representative, former Minority Leader of the California Assembly (2022–2025) from the 3rd district (2014–2026)
- Mike McGuire (Democratic), former president pro tempore of the California State Senate (2024–2025) from the 2nd district (2014–present)

==== Eliminated in primary ====
- Audrey Denney (Democratic), consultant, runner-up for this seat in 2018 and 2020
- Janice Karrman (Democratic), retired wine broker
- Timothy Sean Kelly (No party preference), attorney
- Richard T. Minner (No party preference), software architect

==== Withdrawn ====
- James Salegui (Democratic), financial advisor
- Kyle Wilson (Democratic), labor attorney (endorsed Denney)

==== Declined ====
- Kevin Kiley (No party preference), incumbent U.S. representative from the 3th district (running in the 6th district)

==== Endorsements ====
Audrey Denney (D)

Organizations

- 314 Action
- Council on American–Islamic Relations Action
- Elect Democratic Women
- EMILYs List
- National Women's Political Caucus
- Our Revolution
- Peace Action
- Progressive Democrats of America
- Progressive Victory
- Track AIPAC
James Gallagher (R)

Executive branch officials

- Donald Trump, president of the United States (2017–2021, 2025–present)

U.S. representatives

- Tom Emmer, House majority whip (2023–present) from MN-06 (2015–present)
- Mike Johnson, speaker of the House (2023–present) from LA-04 (2017–present)
- Steve Scalise, House majority leader (2023–present) from LA-01 (2008–present)
- 9 incumbent U.S. representatives
- 2 former U.S. representatives

Organizations

- Howard Jarvis Taxpayers Association

Political parties

- California Republican Party
Mike McGuire (D)

U.S. senators

- Alex Padilla, California (2021–present)
- Adam Schiff, California (2024–present)

U.S. representatives

- Nancy Pelosi, former speaker of the House (2007–2011, 2019–2023) from CA-11 (1987–present)
- 5 incumbent U.S. representatives
- 2 former U.S. representatives

Statewide officials

- Gavin Newsom, governor of California (2019–present)
- Rob Bonta, attorney general of California (2021–present)

State legislators

- Cecilia Aguiar-Curry, majority leader of the California Assembly (2023–present) from AD-04 (2016–present)
- Robert Rivas, speaker of the California Assembly (2023–present) from AD-29 (2018–present)

Labor unions

- California Faculty Association
- California Federation of Labor Unions
- National Nurses United
- National Union of Healthcare Workers
- Nor Cal Carpenters
- SEIU California & SEIU-UHW West

Organizations

- California Environmental Voters
- Center for Biological Diversity Action Fund
- J Street
- Sierra Club

Political parties

- California Democratic Party

Newspapers

- Chico Enterprise-Record
- Daily News
- Oroville Mercury-Register
- The Press Democrat
- The Sacramento Bee

==== Fundraising ====
Campaign finance reports as of May 13, 2026
Candidate	Raised	Spent	Cash on hand
Audrey Denney (D)	$841,789	$747,306	$94,483
Mike McGuire (D)	$1,467,649	$1,250,452	$217,197
James Gallagher (R)	$1,047,240	$567,654	$479,586
Source: Federal Election Commission

==== Polling ====
Poll source	Date(s) administered	Sample size (Note: Key: A – all adults RV – registered voters LV – likely voters V – unclear)	Margin of error	Audrey Denney (D)	James Gallagher (R)	Mike McGuire (D)	Angelita Valles (R)	Kyle Wilson (D)	Undecided
	March 3, 2026	Wilson withdraws from the race							
David Binder Research (D) (Note: Poll sponsored by McGuire's campaign)	February 24–28, 2026	700 (LV)	± 3.7%	18%	30%	33%	4%	2%	11%

==== Results ====
Primary results
Party	Candidate	Votes	%
Republican	James Gallagher	92,975	42.15
Democratic	Mike McGuire	92,121	41.76
Democratic	Audrey Denney	31,378	14.22
Democratic	Janice Karman	1,697	0.77
No party preference	Timothy Sean Kelly	1,640	0.74
No party preference	Richard Minner	784	0.36
Total votes		220,595	100.0

=== General election ===
==== Predictions ====
Source	Ranking	As of
Decision Desk HQ	Safe D (flip)	July 14, 2026
Inside Elections	Solid D (flip)	November 6, 2025
The Cook Political Report	Solid D (flip)	November 5, 2025
Sabato's Crystal Ball	Safe D (flip)	March 2, 2026
The Economist	Safe D (flip)	May 6, 2026

==== Post-primary endorsements ====
James Gallagher (R)

Organizations

- U.S. Chamber of Commerce
Mike McGuire (D)

U.S. representatives

- Greg Casar, TX-35 (2023–present)
- Maxwell Frost, FL-10 (2023–present)
- Pramila Jayapal, WA-7 (2017–present)

Organizations

- Congressional Progressive Caucus

==== Fundraising ====
Campaign finance reports as of June 30, 2026
Candidate	Raised	Spent	Cash on hand
James Gallagher (R)	$1,488,906	$1,156,007	$332,899
Mike McGuire (D)	$1,827,711	$1,675,105	$152,606
Source: Federal Election Commission

==== Polling ====
Poll source	Date(s) administered	Sample size	Margin of error	James Gallagher (R)	Mike McGuire (D)	Other	Undecided
University of Southern California	October 22–28, 2026	444 (LV)	± 4.7%	40%	54%	2% (Note: "I do not plan to vote in this election / I will skip this contest" with 2%)	4%
University of Southern California	October 22–28, 2026	444 (LV)	± 4.7%	41%	56% (Note: With undecideds pushed)	2%	–

==== Results ====
2026 California's 1st congressional district election
Party	Candidate	Votes	%	±%
Republican	James Gallagher (incumbent)			
Democratic	Mike McGuire			
Total votes				

== District 2 ==
2026 California's 2nd congressional district election
- Reporting: 67% as of Nov 10 at 10:12 AM PST
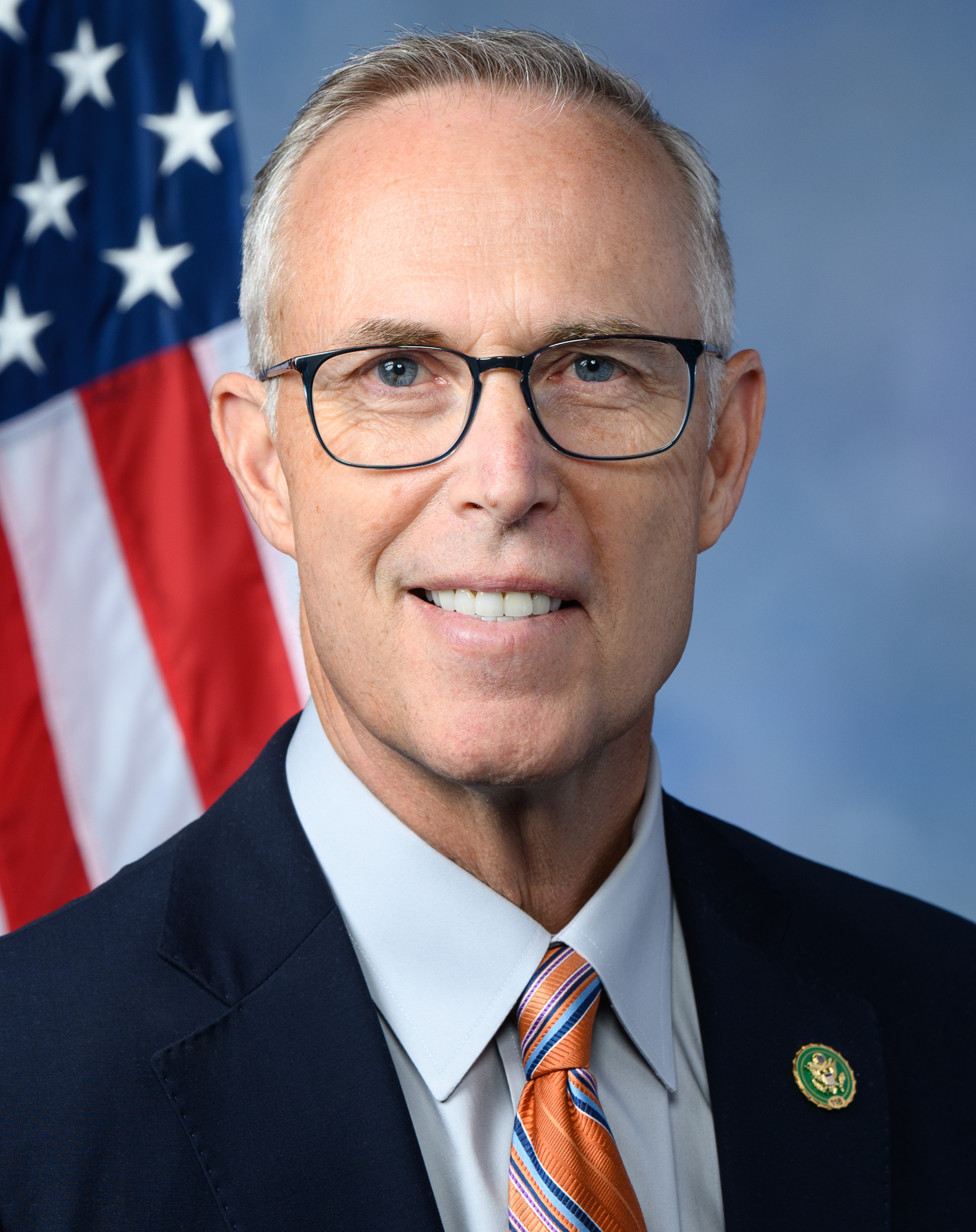

Candidate	Jared Huffman	Robin Littau
Party	Democratic	Republican
Popular vote	142,972	71,979
Percentage	66.5%	33.5%
- Huffman: 70–80% 80–90% Littau: 50–60% 60–70% 70–80%
U.S. representative before election
Jared Huffman
Democratic
Elected U.S. representative
Jared Huffman
Democratic

California's 2nd congressional district boundary from the 2026 elections Interactive map version

The incumbent was Democrat Jared Huffman, who had represented the district since 2013 and was re-elected with 71.9% of the vote in 2024. Huffman again won re-election.

=== Primary ===
==== Advanced to general ====
- Jared Huffman (Democratic), incumbent U.S. representative
- Robin Littau (Republican), Enterprise Elementary School Board trustee

==== Eliminated in primary ====
- Gregory Burgess (No party preference), caregiver
- Tim Geist (Republican), former researcher
- Nicolette Hahn Niman (No party preference), rancher
- Paul Saulsbury (Republican), mental health professional
- Angelita Valles (Republican), former Victorville city councillor
- Rose Penelope Yee (Democratic), businesswoman and runner-up for the 1st district in 2024

==== Withdrawn ====
- Colby Smart (No party preference), deputy superintendent at the Humboldt County Office of Education

=== Endorsements ===
Jared Huffman (D)

Labor unions

- California Federation of Labor Unions

Organizations

- California Environmental Voters
- Center for Biological Diversity Action Fund
- J Street
- Joint Action Committee for Political Affairs
- League of Conservation Voters Action Fund
- Planned Parenthood Action Fund
- Sierra Club

Political parties

- California Democratic Party

Newspapers

- Bay Area Reporter
- Marin Independent Journal
Rose Penelope Yee (D)

Organizations

- Council on American–Islamic Relations Action
- Democratic Socialists of America
- Progressive Democrats of America
- Progressive Victory
- Track AIPAC

=== Fundraising ===
Campaign finance reports as of May 13, 2026
Candidate	Raised	Spent	Cash on hand
Gregory Burgess (I)	$25,033	$21,124	$3,909
Tim Geist (R)	$15,580	$15,188	$392
Nicolette Hahn (I)	$118,609	$74,821	$43,788
Jared Huffman (D)	$868,510	$775,170	$1,077,984
Paul Saulsbury (R)	$10,126	$9,625	$149
Rose Yee (D)	$66,537	$66,193	$3,612
Source: Federal Election Commission

==== Results ====
Primary results
Party	Candidate	Votes	%
Democratic	Jared Huffman (incumbent)	139,662	56.48
Republican	Robin Littau	28,222	11.41
Democratic	Rose Yee	18,898	7.64
Republican	Angelita Valles	16,307	6.59
Republican	Tim Geist	16,160	6.53
Republican	Paul Saulsbury	14,399	5.82
No party preference	Nicolette Niman	11,886	4.81
No party preference	Gregory Burgess	1,759	0.71
Total votes		247,293	100.0

=== General election ===
==== Predictions ====
Source	Ranking	As of
Decision Desk HQ	Safe D	July 14, 2026
The Cook Political Report	Solid D	November 5, 2025
Inside Elections	Solid D	March 7, 2025
Sabato's Crystal Ball	Safe D	July 15, 2025
The Economist	Safe D	May 6, 2026

==== Fundraising ====
Campaign finance reports as of June 30, 2026
Candidate	Raised	Spent	Cash on hand
Jared Huffman (D)	$978,277	$886,864	$1,075,956
Source: Federal Election Commission

==== Results ====
2026 California's 2nd congressional district election
Party	Candidate	Votes	%	±%
Democratic	Jared Huffman (incumbent)			
Republican	Robin Littau			
Total votes				

== District 3 ==
2026 California's 3rd congressional district election
- Reporting: 65% as of Nov 10 at 10:12 AM PST
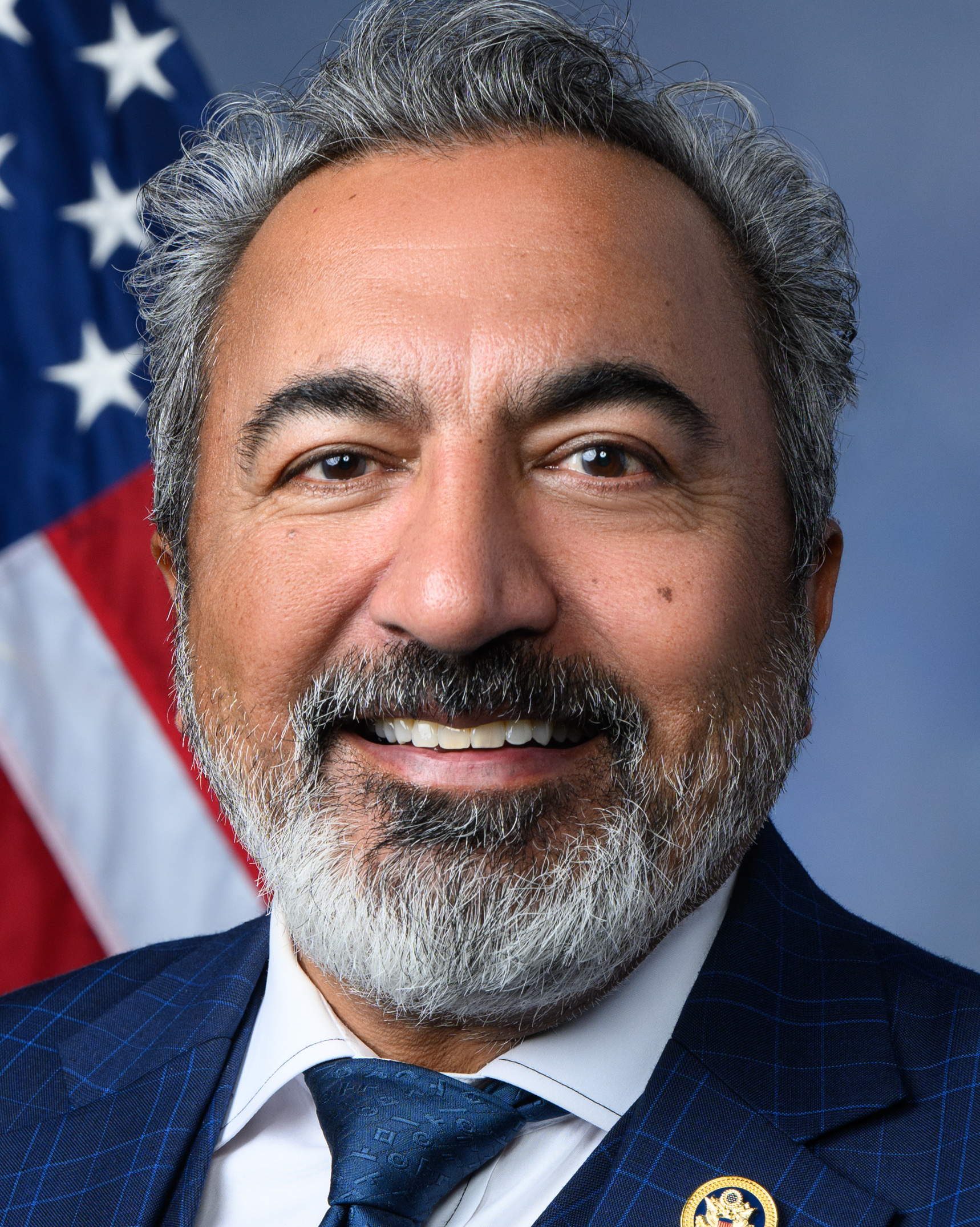

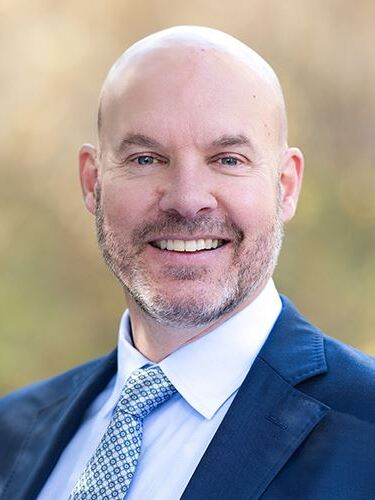
Candidate	Ami Bera	Robb Tucker
Party	Democratic	Republican
Popular vote	122,614	88,752
Percentage	58.0%	42.0%
- Bera: 50–60% 60–70% Tucker: 50–60%
U.S. representative before election
Ami Bera
Democratic
Elected U.S. representative
Ami Bera
Democratic

California's 3rd congressional district boundary from the 2026 elections Interactive map version

The incumbent was Democrat Ami Bera, who had represented California's 6th congressional district prior to redistricting and who was re-elected with 57.6% of the vote in 2024. Bera again won re-election.

=== Primary ===
==== Advanced to general ====
- Ami Bera (Democratic), incumbent U.S. representative
- Robb Tucker (Republican), Nevada County supervisor (2025–present)

==== Eliminated in primary ====
- Christopher Bennett (Democratic), tech strategist
- Christine Bish (Republican), realtor, runner-up for the 6th district in 2020 and 2024 and candidate in 2022
- Lyndon "Pacey" Cervantes (Democratic), broadcaster
- Heidi Hall (Democratic), Nevada County supervisor (2017–present) and runner-up for the 1st district in 2014
- Laura Koscki (Republican), community representative
- Chris Richardson (Green), retired software engineer

==== Withdrawn ====
- Richard Pan (Democratic), former state senator from the 6th district (2014–2022) and candidate for mayor of Sacramento in 2024 (running in the 6th district)

==== Declined ====
- Lauren Babb Tomlinson (Democratic), public affairs chief for Planned Parenthood Mon Marte (ran in the 6th district)
- Janine Bera (Democratic), healthcare executive and wife of U.S. representative Ami Bera
- Kevin Kiley (No party preference), incumbent U.S. representative from the 6th (running in the 6th district)

==== Endorsements ====
Chris Bennett (D)

Labor unions

- California Faculty Association (co-endorsement with Bera)
- National Union of Healthcare Workers
- SEIU California & SEIU-UHW West (co-endorsement with Bera)

Organizations

- Central Sierra Foothills Democratic Socialists of America
- Council on American–Islamic Relations Action
- Progressive Democrats of America
- Track AIPAC
Ami Bera (D)

Labor unions

- California Faculty Association (co-endorsement with Bennett)
- SEIU California & SEIU-UHW West (co-endorsement with Bennett)

Organizations

- 314 Action
- California Environmental Voters (co-endorsement with Hall)
- J Street PAC
- Planned Parenthood Action Fund

Newspapers

- The Sacramento Bee
Heidi Hall (D)

U.S. representatives

- Jared Huffman, CA-02 (2013–present)

Organizations

- California Environmental Voters (co-endorsement with Bera)
- Center for Biological Diversity Action Fund
- National Women's Political Caucus
- Planned Parenthood Action Fund
- Progressive Victory
Robb Tucker (R)

U.S. representatives

- John Duarte, former CA-13 (2023–2025)
- Kevin Kiley, CA-03 (2023–present) (Independent)

Political parties

- California Republican Party

Party chapters

- Nevada County Republican Party
Declined to endorse

Labor unions

- California Federation of Labor Unions

Political parties

- California Democratic Party

==== Fundraising ====
Campaign finance reports as of May 13, 2026
Candidate	Raised	Spent	Cash on hand
Christopher Bennett (D)	$206,136	$165,997	$40,139
Ami Bera (D)	$1,038,702	$1,221,178	$1,690,896
Christine Bish (R)	$130,852	$103,877	$27,025
Pacey Cervantes (D)	$57,328	$55,046	$2,281
Heidi Hall (D)	$573,174	$512,947	$62,684
Robb Tucker (R)	$227,060	$176,718	$50,342
Source: Federal Election Commission

==== Results ====
Primary results
Party	Candidate	Votes	%
Democratic	Ami Bera (incumbent)	76,653	34.26
Republican	Robb Tucker	66,808	29.86
Democratic	Heidi Hall	28,647	12.81
Republican	Christine Bish	26,626	11.90
Democratic	Chris Bennett	16,710	7.47
Republican	Laura Koscki	3,219	1.44
Democratic	Lyndon "Pacey" Cervantes	2,696	1.21
Green	Chris Richardson	2,352	1.05
Total votes		223,711	100.0

=== General election ===
==== Predictions ====
Source	Ranking	As of
Decision Desk HQ	Safe D	July 14, 2026
Inside Elections	Solid D	November 6, 2025
The Cook Political Report	Solid D	November 5, 2025
Sabato's Crystal Ball	Safe D	March 2, 2026
The Economist	Safe D	May 6, 2026

==== Post-primary endorsements ====
Ami Bera (D)

Political parties

- California Democratic Party

Organizations

- Sierra Club

==== Fundraising ====
Campaign finance reports as of June 30, 2026
Candidate	Raised	Spent	Cash on hand
Ami Bera (D)	$1,250,126	$1,293,160	$1,830,338
Robb Tucker (R)	$258,139	$242,139	$16,000
Source: Federal Election Commission

==== Polling ====
Hypothetical polling

Poll source	Date(s) administered	Sample size	Margin of error	Kevin Kiley (R)	Heidi Hall (D)	Undecided
Tulchin Research (D) (Note: Poll sponsored by Hall's campaign) (Note: Poll conducted before the passage of Proposition 50)	July 8–10, 2025	400 (LV)	± 4.9%	47%	45%	8%

==== Results ====
2026 California's 3rd congressional district election
Party	Candidate	Votes	%	±%
Democratic	Ami Bera (incumbent)			
Republican	Robb Tucker			
Total votes				

== District 4 ==
2026 California's 4th congressional district election
- Reporting: 98% as of Nov 16 at 7:54 PM PST

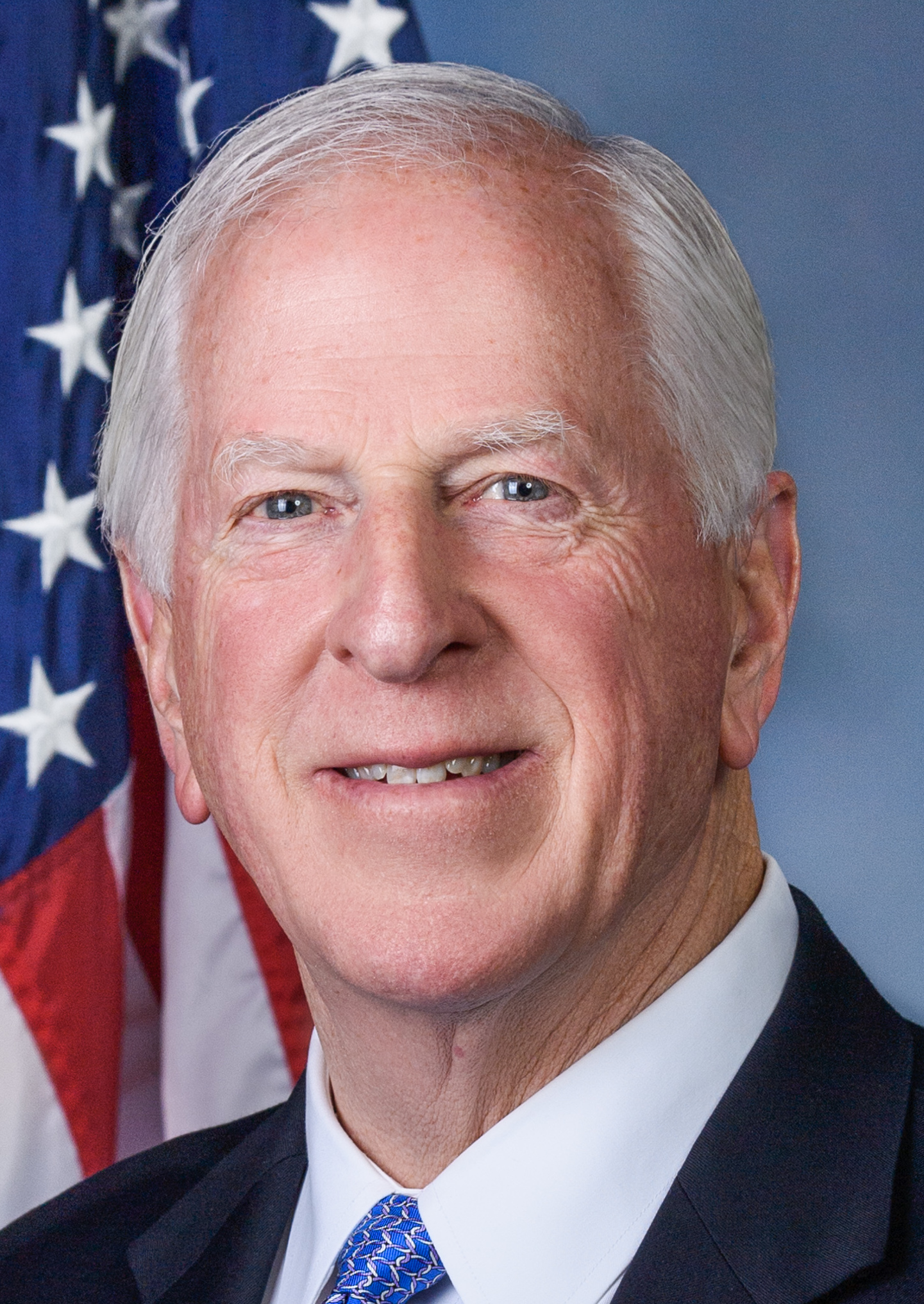
Candidate	Eric Jones	Mike Thompson
Party	Democratic	Democratic
Popular vote	133,179	120,361
Percentage	52.5%	47.5%
- Jones: 50–60% 60–70% Thompson: 50–60%
U.S. representative before election
Mike Thompson
Democratic
Elected U.S. representative
Eric Jones
Democratic

California's 4th congressional district boundary from the 2026 elections Interactive map version

The incumbent is Democrat Mike Thompson, who had represented the district since 2023 and was re-elected with 66.5% of the vote in 2024.

=== Primary ===
==== Advanced to general ====
- Eric Jones (Democratic), business owner
- Mike Thompson (Democratic), incumbent U.S. representative

==== Eliminated in primary ====
- Sharon Brown (Republican), nurse
- Mandy Ghusar, (Republican), nurse
- Jimih Jones (Republican), parts manager and candidate for this district in 2022
- John Mackenzie (Republican), nurse
- Ray Riehle (Republican), business owner and candidate for the 6th district in 2024
- Thomas M Roach (No party preference)
- Chuck Uribe (Republican), teacher

==== Declined ====
- Kevin Kiley (No party preference), incumbent U.S. representative from the 3rd district (running in the 6th district)

==== Endorsements ====
Eric Jones (D)

Organizations

- American Independent Party (Endorsement rejected by candidate)
- Center for Biological Diversity Action Fund
- Our Revolution
Mike Thompson (D)

U.S. Senators

- Ben Ray Lujan, New Mexico (2021–present)
- Catherine Cortez Masto, Nevada (2017–present)
- Alex Padilla, California (2021–present)
- Adam Schiff, California (2025–present)

U.S. representatives

- Katherine Clark, House minority whip (2023–present) from MA-05 (2013–present)
- Nancy Pelosi, former speaker of the House (2007–2011, 2019–2023) from CA-11 (1987–present)
- Hakeem Jeffries, House minority leader (2023–present) from NY-08 (2013–present)
- 55 incumbent U.S. representatives
- 2 former U.S. representatives

Statewide officials

- Eleni Kounalakis, lieutenant governor of California (2019–present)
- Gavin Newsom, governor of California (2019–present)

State legislators

- Cecilia Aguiar-Curry, majority leader of the California Assembly (2023–present) from AD-04 (2016–present)

Individuals

- Dolores Huerta, labor leader (Deceased)

Labor Unions

- California Federation of Labor Unions
- National Union of Healthcare Workers
- SEIU United Healthcare Workers West

Organizations

- Brady Campaign
- League of Conservation Voters
- J Street
- Planned Parenthood Action Fund
- Sierra Club

Political parties

- California Democratic Party

Newspapers

- Bay Area Reporter
- The Sacramento Bee

=== Fundraising ===
Campaign finance reports as of May 13, 2026
Candidate	Raised	Spent	Cash on hand
Sharon Brown (R)	$7,000	$5,165	$1,835
Mandy Ghusar (R)	$7,000	$5,506	$1,494
Eric Jones (D)	$8,131,514 (Note: $5,164,133 of this total was self-funded by Jones.)	$3,850,961	$4,280,554
Laurie John MacKenzie (R)	$14,128	$5,435	$8,693
Ray Riehle (R)	$112,696	$110,500	$2,735
Mike Thompson (D)	$3,482,591	$2,954,652	$1,737,428
Source: Federal Election Commission

==== Results ====
Primary results by county: Thompson—50–60% Thompson—40–50% Thompson—30–40% Thompson—20–30% Riehle—30–40%

Primary results
Party	Candidate	Votes	%
Democratic	Mike Thompson (incumbent)	84,753	40.97
Democratic	Eric Jones	45,992	22.23
Republican	Ray Riehle	42,883	20.73
Republican	Sharon Brown	9,818	4.75
Republican	John Mackenzie	9,691	4.68
Republican	Chuck Uribe	7,235	3.50
Republican	Jimih Jones	3,001	1.45
Republican	Mandy Ghusar	1,987	0.96
No party preference	Thomas Roach	1,527	0.74
Total votes		206,887	100.0

=== General election ===
==== Predictions ====
Source	Ranking	As of
Decision Desk HQ	Safe D	July 14, 2026
The Cook Political Report	Solid D	November 5, 2025
Inside Elections	Solid D	March 7, 2025
Sabato's Crystal Ball	Safe D	July 15, 2025
The Economist	Safe D	May 6, 2026

==== Post-primary endorsements ====
Eric Jones (D)

U.S. representatives

- Ro Khanna, CA-17 (2017–present)

Individuals

- Ray Riehle, business owner, primary candidate for this district in 2026 (Republican)

==== Fundraising ====
Campaign finance reports as of October 14, 2026
Candidate	Raised	Spent	Cash on hand
Mike Thompson (D)	$5,482,944	$5,290,993	$1,401,440
Eric Jones (D)	$18,058,057	$16,516,978	$1,541,079
Source: Federal Election Commission

==== Polling ====
Poll source	Date(s) administered	Sample size	Margin of error	Mike Thompson (D)	Eric Jones (D)	Undecided
Fulcrum Strategy Group (Note: Poll sponsored by Jones's campaign)	October 18–20, 2026	400 (LV)	± 4.9%	40%	53%	7%
David Binder Research (D)	October 2026	600 (V)	± 2.8%–4.0%	35%	45%	20%

==== Results ====
2026 California's 4th congressional district election
Party	Candidate	Votes	%	±%
Democratic	Mike Thompson (incumbent)			
Democratic	Eric Jones			
Total votes				

== District 5 ==
2026 California's 5th congressional district election
- Reporting: 76% as of Nov 10 at 10:12 AM PST
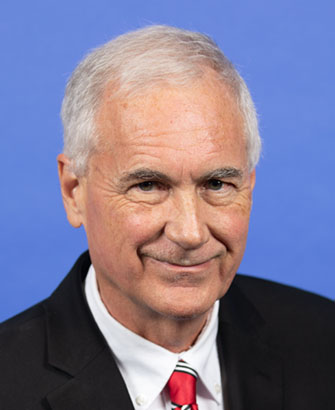

Candidate	Tom McClintock	Michael Masuda
Party	Republican	Democratic
Popular vote	130,858	102,154
Percentage	56.2%	43.8%
- McClintock: 50–60% 60–70% 70–80% Masuda: 50–60% 60–70%
U.S. representative before election
Tom McClintock
Republican
Elected U.S. representative
Tom McClintock
Republican

California's 5th congressional district boundary from the 2026 elections Interactive map version

The incumbent was Republican Tom McClintock who had represented the district since 2023 and was re-elected with 61.8% of the vote in 2024. McClintock again won re-election.

=== Primary ===
==== Advanced to general ====
- Michael Masuda (Democratic), engineer
- Tom McClintock (Republican), incumbent U.S. representative

==== Eliminated in primary ====
- Michael Barkley (Democratic), attorney and runner-up for this district in 2022 and 2024
- Dan Stroud (Democratic), engineer and business owner

==== Withdrawn ====
- Paul Danbom (Democratic), farmer (endorsed Masuda)
- Kevin Kiley (No party preference), incumbent U.S. representative from the 6th district (running in the 6th district)
- Katelyn Sills (Democratic), farmer and software engineer

==== Endorsements ====
Michael Masuda (D)

U.S. senators

- Andy Kim, New Jersey (2025–present)

Individuals

- Paul Danbom, farmer and former candidate for this seat

Labor unions

- California Federation of Labor Unions

Political parties

- California Democratic Party

Organizations

- Progressive Democrats of America
Tom McClintock (R)

Executive branch officials

- Donald Trump, president of the United States (2017–2021, 2025–present)

Political parties

- California Republican Party

==== Fundraising ====
Campaign finance reports as of May 13, 2026
Candidate	Raised	Spent	Cash on hand
Michael Barkley (D)	$53,945	$55,632	$3,051
Michael Masuda (D)	$272,165	$224,651	$47,513
Tom McClintock (R)	$819,918	$797,630	$170,493
Source: Federal Election Commission

==== Results ====
Primary results
Party	Candidate	Votes	%
Republican	Tom McClintock (incumbent)	129,653	61.29
Democratic	Michael Masuda	51,418	24.31
Democratic	Michael Barkley	19,349	9.15
Democratic	Dan Stroud	11,122	5.26
Total votes		211,542	100.0

=== General election ===
==== Predictions ====
Source	Ranking	As of
Decision Desk HQ	Likely R	September 8, 2026
The Cook Political Report	Solid R	November 5, 2025
Inside Elections	Solid R	March 7, 2025
Sabato's Crystal Ball	Safe R	July 15, 2025
The Economist	Safe R	May 6, 2026

==== Post-primary endorsements ====
Michael Masuda (D)

Organizations

- Sierra Club
Tom McClintock (R)

Organizations

- U.S. Chamber of Commerce

==== Fundraising ====
Campaign finance reports as of June 30, 2026
Candidate	Raised	Spent	Cash on hand
Tom McClintock (R)	$928,788	$875,521	$201,472
Michael Masuda (D)	$361,735	$272,284	$89,452
Source: Federal Election Commission

==== Results ====
2026 California's 5th congressional district election
Party	Candidate	Votes	%	±%
Republican	Tom McClintock (incumbent)			
Democratic	Michael Masuda			
Total votes				

== District 6 ==
2026 California's 6th congressional district election
- Reporting: 63% as of Nov 9 at 2:44 PM PST
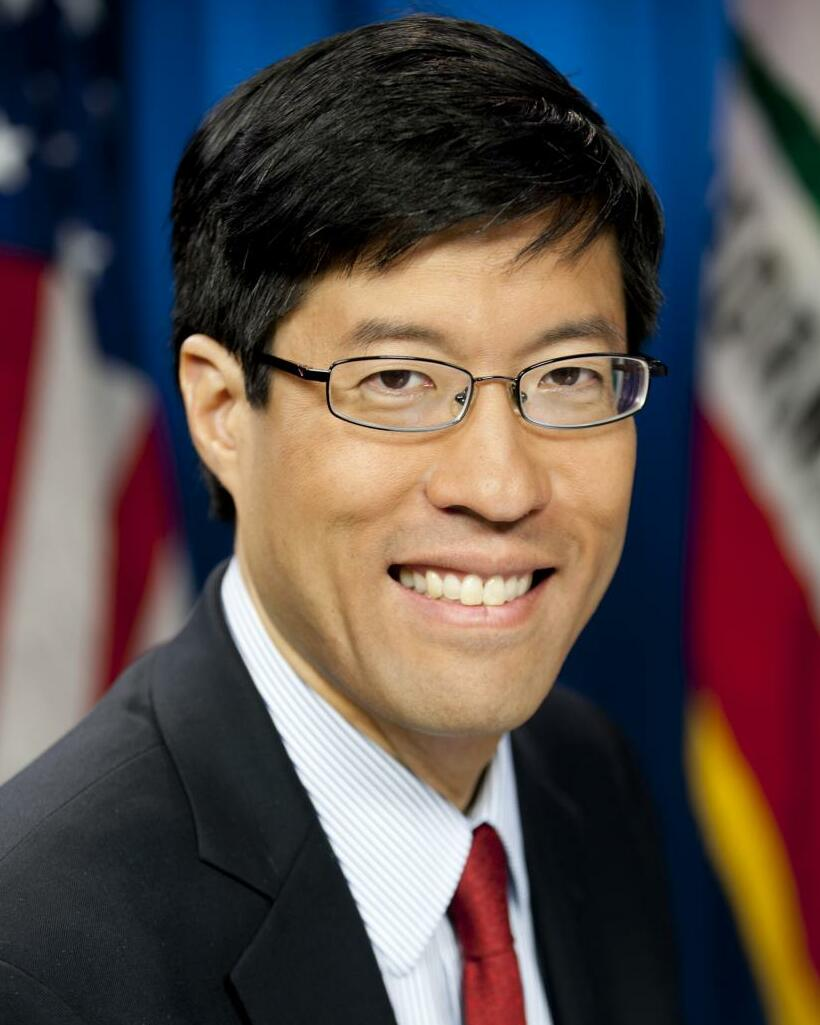

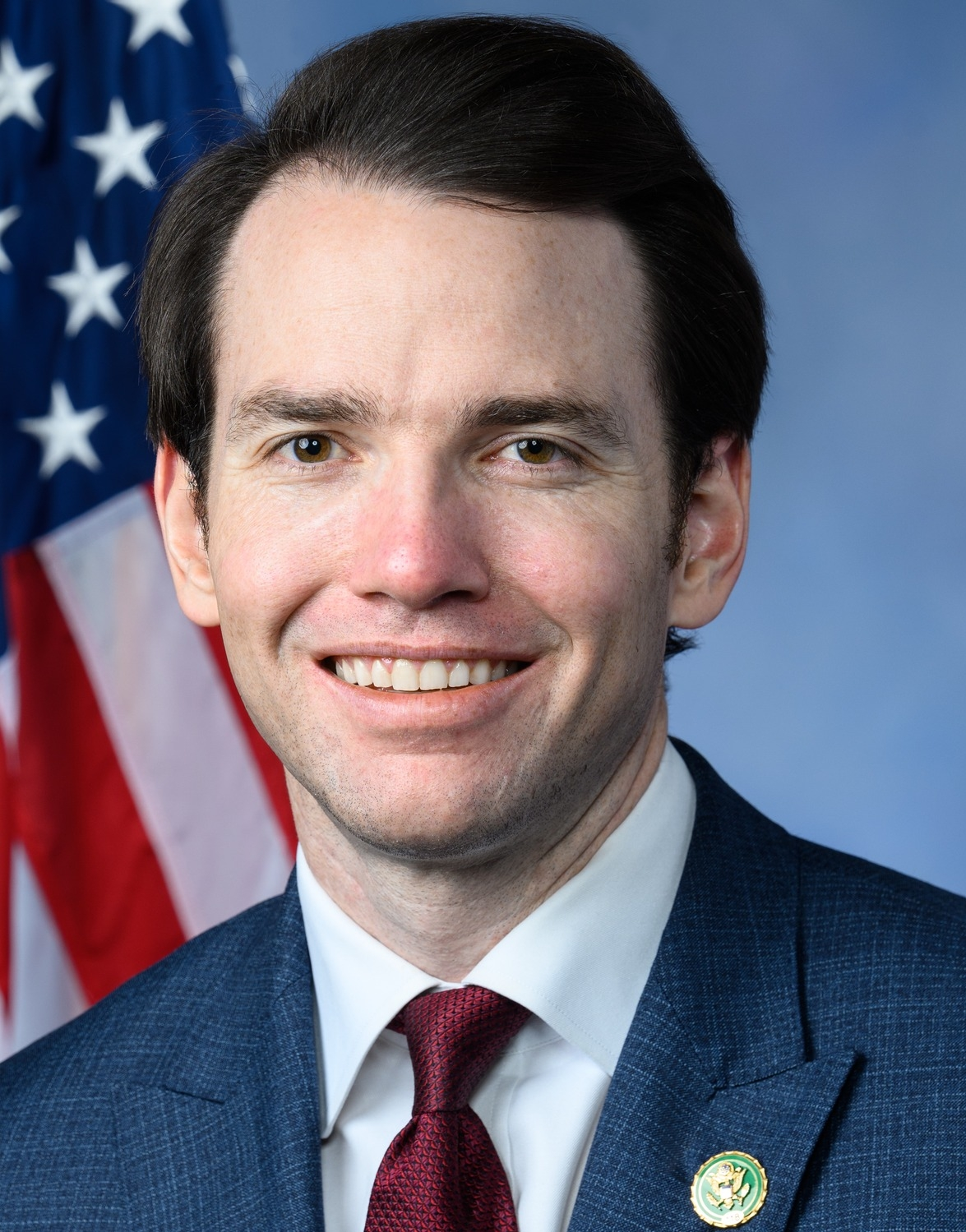
Candidate	Richard Pan	Kevin Kiley
Party	Democratic	No party preference
Popular vote	108,065	76,313
Percentage	58.6%	41.4%
- Pan: 60–70% Kiley: 50–60%
U.S. representative before election
Kevin Kiley
Independent
Elected U.S. representative
Richard Pan
Democratic

California's 6th congressional district boundary from the 2026 elections Interactive map version

The incumbent was Independent Kevin Kiley, who had represented California's 3rd congressional district prior to re-districting and had been re-elected as a Republican with 55.5% of the vote in 2024. Kiley was defeated by Democrat Richard Pan.

=== Primary ===
==== Advanced to general ====
- Kevin Kiley (No party preference), incumbent U.S. representative
- Richard Pan (Democratic), former state senator from the 6th district (2014–2022) and candidate for mayor of Sacramento in 2024 (previously ran in the 3rd district)

==== Eliminated in primary ====
- Lauren Babb Tomlinson (Democratic), public affairs chief for Planned Parenthood Mar Monte
- Martha Guerrero (Democratic), mayor of West Sacramento
- Thien Ho (Democratic), Sacramento County district attorney (2023–present)
- Michael Stansfield (Republican), applications engineer and Democratic candidate for Oregon's 1st congressional district in 2018
- Tyler Vandenberg (Democratic), U.S. Marine veteran

==== Declined ====
- Angelique Ashby (Democratic), state senator from the 8th district (2022–present)
- Ami Bera (Democratic), incumbent U.S. representative from the 3rd (running in the 3rd district)

==== Endorsements ====
Lauren Babb Tomlinson (D)

U.S. representatives

- 10 Incumbent U.S. representatives
- 1 former U.S. representative

Party officials

- David Hogg, former vice chair of the Democratic National Committee (2025)

Labor unions

- National Union of Healthcare Workers (co-endorsement with Pan)

Organizations

- California Environmental Voters
- Congressional Black Caucus PAC
- Congressional Progressive Caucus PAC
- Courage California
- Elect Democratic Women
- EMILYs List
- End Citizens United
- J Street (co-endorsement with Pan)
- Leaders We Deserve
- National Women's Political Caucus
- Planned Parenthood Action Fund
- Vote Mama
Martha Guerrero (D)

State legislators

- Richard Polanco, former majority leader of the California State Senate (1998–2002) from the 22nd district (1994–2002)

Local officials

- Gil Cedillo, former Los Angeles City Councilor from the 1st district (2013–2022)

Organizations

- Center for Biological Diversity Action Fund
Thien Ho (D)

U.S. representatives

- Adam Gray, CA-13 (2025–present)
- Derek Tran, CA-45 (2025–present)

State legislators

- Stephanie Nguyen, state assemblymember from the 10th district (2022–present)

Local officials

- Jim Cooper, sheriff of Sacramento County (2022–present) and former state assemblymember from the 9th district (2014–2022)
- Kevin McCarty, mayor of Sacramento (2024–present)

Organizations

- Blue Dog PAC
Richard Pan (D)

U.S. representatives

- 6 Incumbent U.S. representatives

Labor unions

- AFSCME California
- California Faculty Association
- California Federation of Labor Unions
- National Union of Healthcare Workers (co-endorsement with Tomlinson)
- * SEIU California & SEIU-UHW West
- United Nurses Association of California

Organizations

- 314 Action
- J Street (co-endorsement with Tomlinson)

Newspapers

- The Sacramento Bee
Declined to endorse

State legislators

- Angelique Ashby, state senator from the 8th district (2022–present) (Democratic)

Political parties

- California Democratic Party

==== Fundraising ====
Campaign finance reports as of May 13, 2026
Candidate	Raised	Spent	Cash on hand
Lauren Babb Tomlinson (D)	$471,896	$364,100	$107,796
Martha Guerrero (D)	$186,301	$141,547	$44,754
Thien Ho (D)	$810,831	$663,563	$147,268
Kevin Kiley (I)	$2,699,316	$1,094,667	$1,985,627
Richard Pan (D)	$687,794	$569,763	$118,031
Michael Stansfield (R)	$17,441	$17,441	$0
Tyler Vandenberg (D)	$89,764	$81,562	$8,202
Source: Federal Election Commission

==== Polling ====
Poll source	Date(s) administered	Sample size	Margin of error	Lauren Babb Tomlinson (D)	Martha Guerrero (D)	Thien Ho (D)	Kevin Kiley (I)	Richard Pan (D)	Michael Stansfield (R)	Tyler Vandenberg (D)	Undecided
EMC Research (D) (Note: Poll sponsored by the Voter Protection Project, a group that supports Democrats)	May 3–6, 2026	400 (LV)	± 4.9%	11%	9%	12%	36%	18%	8%	2%	4%

Hypothetical polling

Poll source	Date(s) administered	Sample size	Margin of error	Christine Bish (R)	Martha Guerrero (D)	Thien Ho (D)	Richard Pan (D)	Ray Riehle (R)	Lauren Babb Tomlinson (D)	Tyler Vandenberg (D)	Undecided
Normington, Petts & Associates (D) (Note: Poll sponsored by Babb Tomlinson's campaign)	February 16–19, 2026	400 (LV)	± 4.9%	15%	9%	8%	14%	15%	10%	3%	26%

==== Results ====
Primary results
Party	Candidate	Votes	%
No party preference	Kevin Kiley (incumbent)	47,165	24.28
Democratic	Richard Pan	45,008	23.17
Republican	Michael Stansfield	39,118	20.14
Democratic	Lauren Babb Tomlinson	23,857	12.28
Democratic	Thien Ho	20,715	10.67
Democratic	Martha Guerrero	15,296	7.88
Democratic	Tyler Vandenberg	3,058	1.57
Total votes		194,217	100.0

=== General election ===
==== Predictions ====
Source	Ranking	As of
Decision Desk HQ	Safe D (flip)	July 14, 2026
Inside Elections	Likely D (flip)	October 29, 2026
The Cook Political Report	Solid D (flip)	November 5, 2025
Sabato's Crystal Ball	Likely D (flip)	March 2, 2026
The Economist	Safe D (flip)	May 6, 2026

==== Post-primary endorsements ====
Kevin Kiley (I)

U.S. Senators

- Joe Manchin, former West Virginia (2010–2025) (Independent; Democratic until 2024)

Party officials

- Andrew Yang, entrepreneur, founder of Venture for America, Democratic candidate for president in 2020 and mayor of New York City in 2021, chair of the Forward Party (2022–present) (Forward)

Organizations

- AIPAC
- Howard Jarvis Taxpayers Association
- Independent Leadership Council
- MAHA Action
- MAHA PAC
- NRA Political Victory Fund
- United States Chamber of Commerce

Political parties

- Forward Party
Richard Pan (D)

Executive branch officials

- Xavier Becerra, former United States Secretary of Health and Human Services (2021–2025)
- Kamala Harris, former Vice President of the United States (2021–2025)

Organizations

- ASPIRE PAC

Political parties

- California Democratic Party

Newspapers

- The Sacramento Bee

==== Fundraising ====
Campaign finance reports as of September 30, 2026
Candidate	Raised	Spent	Cash on hand
Kevin Kiley (I)	$3,570,594	$3,431,713	$519,859
Richard Pan (D)	$2,312,761	$1,699,926	$612,835
Source: Federal Election Commission

==== Polling ====
Poll source	Date(s) administered	Sample size	Margin of error	Kevin Kiley (I)	Richard Pan (D)	Other	Undecided
University of Southern California	October 22–28, 2026	439 (LV)	± 4.7%	38%	51%	1% (Note: "I do not plan to vote in this election / I will skip this contest" with 1%)	10%
University of Southern California	October 22–28, 2026	439 (LV)	± 4.7%	43%	55%	2%	–
The Bullfinch Group (Note: Poll sponsored by the Independent Leadership Council, which supports Kiley.)	September 1–6, 2026	927 (LV)	± 3.2%	37%	37%	–	27%
The Bullfinch Group/Independent Center	July 13–16, 2026	741 (LV)	± 3.59%	35%	39%	–	26%

==== Results ====
2026 California's 6th congressional district election
Party	Candidate	Votes	%	±%
No party preference	Kevin Kiley (incumbent)			
Democratic	Richard Pan			
Total votes				

== District 7 ==
2026 California's 7th congressional district election
- Reporting: 70% as of Nov 10 at 10:12 AM PST
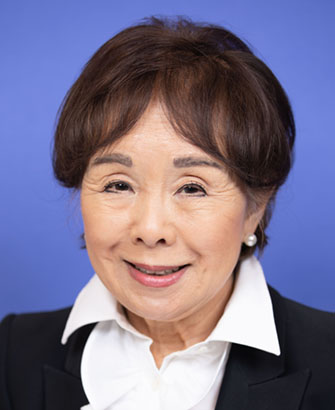

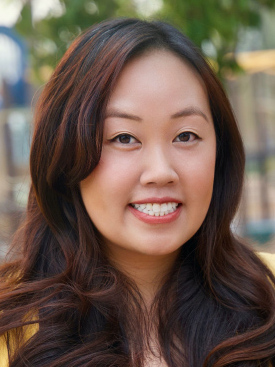
Candidate	Doris Matsui	Mai Vang
Party	Democratic	Democratic
- Matsui: 60–70% Vang: 50–60%
Incumbent U.S. representative
Doris Matsui
Democratic

California's 7th congressional district boundary from the 2026 elections Interactive map version

The incumbent is Democrat Doris Matsui, who had represented the district since 2023 and was re-elected with 66.8% of the vote in 2024.

=== Primary ===
==== Advanced to general ====
- Doris Matsui (Democratic), incumbent U.S. representative
- Mai Vang (Democratic), Sacramento city councilor (2020–present)

==== Eliminated in primary ====
- Robert Morin (Democratic), business owner
- Enayat Nazhat (Democratic), attorney, former intelligence linguist
- Ralph Nwobi (Republican), attorney
- Zachariah Wooden (Republican), college student

==== Withdrawn ====
- Erica Lee (Democratic), former state worker (endorsed Vang)
- Kathryn Ming (Republican), software engineer

==== Declined ====
- Kevin Kiley (Independent), incumbent U.S. representative from the 3rd district (running in the 6th district)
- Bobbie Singh-Allen, mayor of Elk Grove (2020–present) (endorsed Matsui)

==== Endorsements ====
Doris Matsui (D)

U.S. senators

- Alex Padilla, California (2021–present)
- Adam Schiff, California (2024–present)

U.S. representatives

- Nancy Pelosi, former speaker of the House (2007–2011, 2019–2023) from CA-11 (1987–present)
- 10 Incumbent U.S. representatives
- 1 Former U.S. representative

Statewide officials

- Eleni Kounalakis, lieutenant governor of California (2019–present)
- Gavin Newsom, governor of California (2019–present)

Local officials

- Kevin McCarty, mayor of Sacramento (2024–present)
- 5 Incumbent Sacramento city councilors
- Bobbie Singh-Allen, mayor of Elk Grove (2020–present)

Tribal nations

- Wilton Rancheria

Labor unions

- California Federation of Labor Unions (co-endorsement with Vang)

Organizations

- League of Conservation Voters Action Fund
- Natural Resources Defense Council
- National Women's Political Caucus
- Planned Parenthood Action Fund

Political parties

- California Democratic Party
Mai Vang (D)

State legislators

- Angelique Ashby, majority leader of the California Senate
- Chris Rabb, Pennsylvania’s HD-200 and 2026 nominee for PA-03

Local officials

- Jane Kim, former San Francisco supervisor
- 2 Incumbent Sacramento city councilmembers

Party officials

- David Hogg, former vice chair of the Democratic National Committee

Individuals

- John McCrea, musician

Labor unions

- California Federation of Labor Unions (co-endorsement with Matsui)
- National Nurses United
- National Union of Healthcare Workers
- United Auto Workers Region 6

Organizations

- Center for Biological Diversity Action Fund
- Council on American–Islamic Relations Action
- Courage California
- Food and Water Action
- Justice Democrats
- Leaders We Deserve
- Our Revolution
- Peace Action
- Progressive Democrats of America
- Progressive Victory
- Sacramento Democratic Socialists of America
- Sunrise Movement
- Track AIPAC

Political parties

- California Working Families Party

Newspapers

- The Sacramento Bee

==== Fundraising ====
Campaign finance reports as of May 13, 2026
Candidate	Raised	Spent	Cash on hand
Doris Matsui (D)	$2,959,675 (Note: $15,100 of this total was self-funded by Matsui.)	$1,874,568	$1,391,776
Robert Morin (D)	$30,255	$5,247	$25,007
Mai Vang (D)	$813,611	$619,906	$193,705
Source: Federal Election Commission

==== Polling ====
Poll source	Date(s) administered	Sample size	Margin of error	Doris Matsui (D)	Robert Morin (D)	Enayat Nazhat (D)	Ralph Nwobi (R)	Mai Vang (D)	Zachariah Wooden (R)	Undecided
Data for Progress (D) (Note: Poll sponsored by Vang's campaign)	May 1–5, 2026	572 (LV)	± 4.0%	24%	1%	1%	6%	22%	15%	31%

Hypothetical polling

Poll source	Date(s) administered	Sample size	Margin of error	Doris Matsui (D)	Kathryn Ming (R)	Robert Morin (D)	Enayat Nazhat (D)	Mai Vang (D)	George Yang (R)	Undecided
Upswing Research	March 17–23, 2026	400 (LV)	± 4.9%	28%	8%	2%	1%	17%	22%	24%

==== Results ====
Primary results
Party	Candidate	Votes	%
Democratic	Mai Vang	65,617	31.23
Democratic	Doris Matsui (incumbent)	61,114	29.09
Republican	Zachariah Wooden	45,994	21.89
Republican	Ralph Nwobi	31,670	15.07
Democratic	Robby Morin	4,107	1.95
Democratic	Enayat Nazhat	1,613	0.77
Total votes		210,115	100.0

=== General election ===
==== Predictions ====
Source	Ranking	As of
Decision Desk HQ	Safe D	July 14, 2026
The Cook Political Report	Solid D	November 5, 2025
Inside Elections	Solid D	March 7, 2025
Sabato's Crystal Ball	Safe D	July 15, 2025
The Economist	Safe D	May 6, 2026

==== Post-primary endorsements ====
Doris Matsui (D)

Organizations

- Sierra Club
Mai Vang (D)

U.S. representatives

- Ro Khanna, CA-17 (2017–present)

State legislators

- Donavan McKinney, Michigan's HD-11 and 2026 nominee for MI-13
- Claire Valdez, New York's AD-37 and 2026 nominee for NY-07

Individuals

- Darializa Avila Chevalier, community organizer and 2026 nominee for NY-13
- Adam Hamawy, surgeon and 2026 nominee for NJ-12
- Melat Kiros, attorney and 2026 nominee for CO-01

Labor unions

- Service Employees International Union California

Organizations

- A New Policy
- Jane Fonda Climate PAC

==== Fundraising ====
Campaign finance reports as of October 14, 2026
Candidate	Raised	Spent	Cash on hand
Doris Matsui (D)	$7,837,819	$6,148,707	$1,995,780
Mai Vang (D)	$1,828,418	$1,439,654	$388,763
Source: Federal Election Commission

==== Polling ====
Poll source	Date(s) administered	Sample size	Margin of error	Doris Matsui (D)	Mai Vang (D)	Undecided
University of Southern California	October 28 – November 1, 2026	442 (LV)	± 4.7%	41%	36%	22% (Note: "I do not plan to vote in this election / I will skip this contest" with 6%)
University of Southern California	October 28 – November 1, 2026	442 (LV)	± 4.7%	49%	39%	12% (Note: "I do not plan to vote in this election / I will skip this contest" with 12%)
RedBox Research (D) (Note: Poll sponsored by A Fight Worth Having)	October 20–23, 2026	722 (LV)	± 4.7%	32%	32%	36% (Note: "Someone else" with 18%; "Did not vote in this race" with 7%; "Prefer not to answer" with 3%)
Data for Progress (D) (Note: Poll sponsored by Justice Democrats, Leaders We Deserve, and the Working Families Party, all of whom support Vang)	August 18–21, 2026	651 (LV)	± 4.0%	28%	32%	40%

==== Results ====
2026 California's 7th congressional district election
Party	Candidate	Votes	%	±%
Democratic	Doris Matsui (incumbent)			
Democratic	Mai Vang			
Total votes				

== District 8 ==
2026 California's 8th congressional district election
- Reporting: 91% as of Nov 10 at 10:12 AM PST
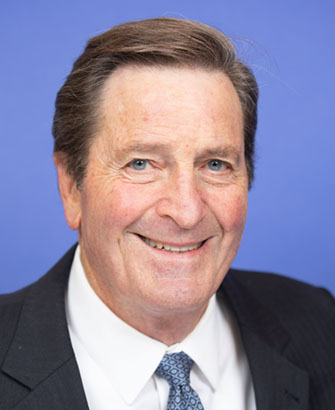

Candidate	John Garamendi	Rudy Recile
Party	Democratic	Republican
Popular vote	171,842	66,022
Percentage	72.2%	27.8%
U.S. representative before election
John Garamendi
Democratic
Elected U.S. representative
John Garamendi
Democratic

California's 8th congressional district boundary from the 2026 elections Interactive map version

The incumbent was Democrat John Garamendi who had represented the district since 2023 and was re-elected with 74.0% of the vote in 2024. Garamendi again won re-election.

=== Primary ===
==== Advanced to general ====
- John Garamendi (Democratic), incumbent U.S. representative
- Rudy Recile (Republican), businessman and runner-up for this district in 2022 and 2024

==== Eliminated in primary ====
- Nicolas Carjuzaa (Democratic), financial policy analyst
- Aaron Rowden (Democratic), public health policy analyst

==== Endorsements ====
Nicolas Carjuzaa (D)

Organizations

- Contra Costa Young Democrats
- Our Revolution East Bay
- Track AIPAC
John Garamendi (D)

Labor unions

- California Federation of Labor Unions
- National Union of Healthcare Workers

Organizations

- California Environmental Voters
- Council for a Livable World
- J Street PAC
- Planned Parenthood Action Fund
- Sierra Club

Political parties

- California Democratic Party

Newspapers

- Bay Area Reporter

==== Fundraising ====
Campaign finance reports as of May 13, 2026
Candidate	Raised	Spent	Cash on hand
Nicolas Carjuzaa (D)	$28,328	$23,581	$4,747
John Garamendi (D)	$441,195	$439,685	$1,266,228
Rudy Recile (R)	$7,737	$7,351	$1,424
Aaron Rowden (D)	$14,716	$13,434	$294
Source: Federal Election Commission

==== Results ====
Primary results
Party	Candidate	Votes	%
Democratic	John Garamendi (incumbent)	97,155	54.41
Republican	Rudy Recile	49,599	27.78
Democratic	Nicolas Carjuzaa	22,587	12.65
Democratic	Aaron Rowden	9,220	5.16
Total votes		178,561	100.0

=== General election ===
==== Predictions ====
Source	Ranking	As of
Decision Desk HQ	Safe D	July 14, 2026
The Cook Political Report	Solid D	November 5, 2025
Inside Elections	Solid D	March 7, 2025
Sabato's Crystal Ball	Safe D	July 15, 2025
The Economist	Safe D	May 6, 2026

==== Fundraising ====
Campaign finance reports as of June 30, 2026
Candidate	Raised	Spent	Cash on hand
John Garamendi (D)	$489,135	$557,834	$1,196,018
Rudy Recile (R)	$8,576	$8,073	$1,541
Source: Federal Election Commission

==== Results ====
2026 California's 8th congressional district election
Party	Candidate	Votes	%	±%
Democratic	John Garamendi (incumbent)			
Republican	Rudy Recile			
Total votes				

== District 9 ==
2026 California's 9th congressional district election
- Reporting: 92% as of Nov 10 at 10:12 AM PST
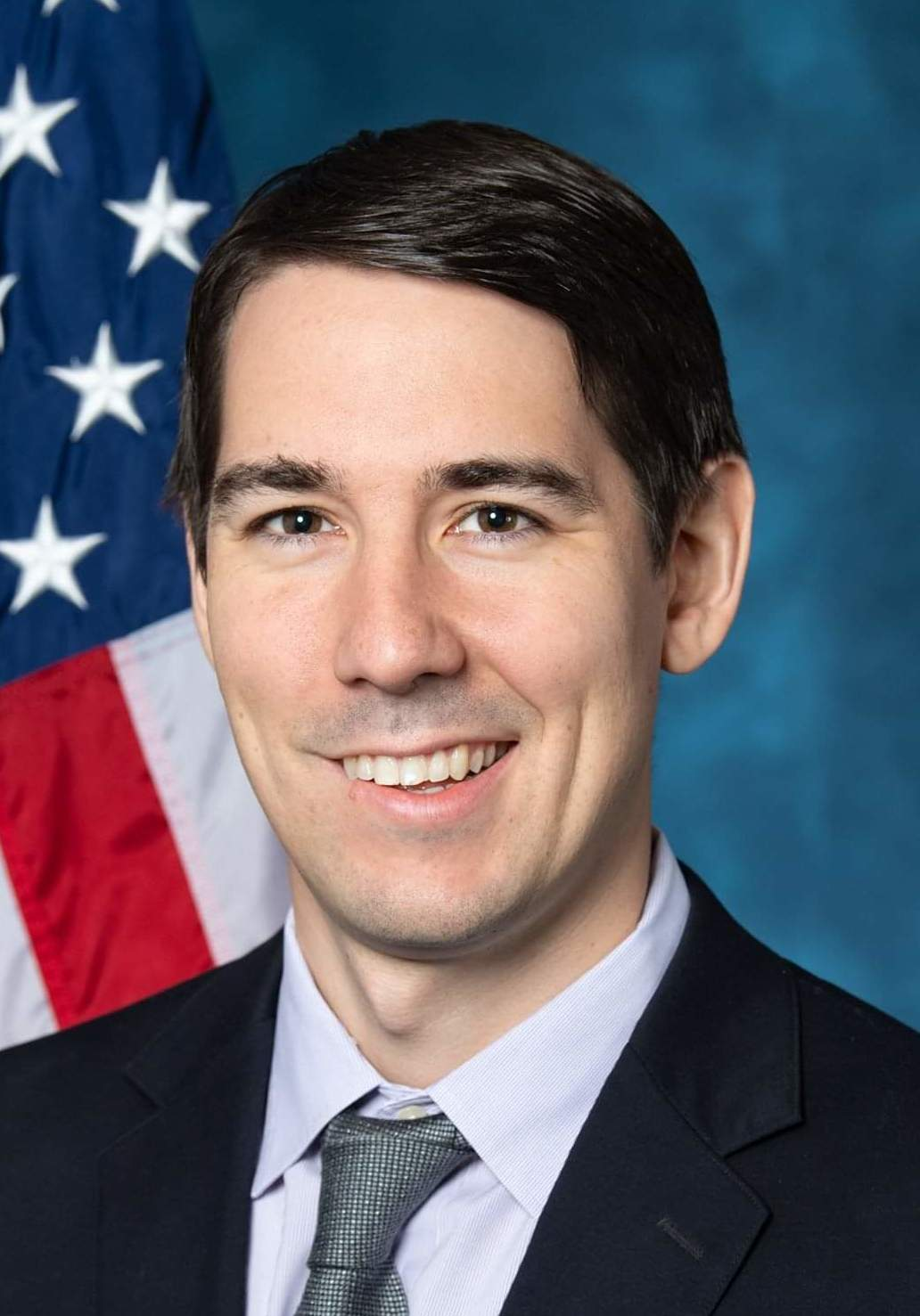

Candidate	Josh Harder	John McBride
Party	Democratic	Republican
Popular vote	131,815	66,851
Percentage	66.4%	33.6%
U.S. representative before election
Josh Harder
Democratic
Elected U.S. representative
Josh Harder
Democratic

California's 9th congressional district boundary from the 2026 elections Interactive map version

The incumbent was Democrat Josh Harder who had represented the district since 2023 and was re-elected with 51.8% of the vote in 2024. Harder again won re-election.

=== Primary ===
==== Advanced to general ====
- Josh Harder (Democratic), incumbent U.S. representative
- John McBride (Republican), athletic coach and candidate for this district in 2024

==== Eliminated in primary ====
- Khalid Jeffrey Jafri (Republican), engineer
- Parminder "Happy" Singh (Republican), commercial real estate analyst
- Martin "Vmann" Veprauskas (Republican), retired navy manager

==== Withdrawn ====
- Kevin Lincoln (Republican), former mayor of Stockton (2021–2025) and runner-up for this district in 2024 (running in the 13th district)
- Jim Shoemaker (Republican), businessman, candidate for this district in 2022, and runner-up for California's 5th senatorial district in 2024 (ran for state assembly)

==== Endorsements ====
Josh Harder (D)

U.S. representatives

- Mark DeSaulnier, CA-10 (2015–present)

Labor unions

- California Federation of Labor Unions
- National Union of Healthcare Workers

Organizations

- AIPAC
- California Environmental Voters
- Council for a Livable World
- Democratic Majority for Israel
- End Citizens United
- Giffords
- Jewish Democratic Council of America
- J Street
- Joint Action Committee for Political Affairs
- League of Conservation Voters Action Fund
- Planned Parenthood Action Fund
- Population Connection
- Reproductive Freedom for All
- Sierra Club

Political parties

- California Democratic Party

Newspapers

- Bay Area Reporter
Jim Shoemaker (R) (withdrawn)

U.S. representatives

- Kevin Kiley, CA-03 (2023–present) (Independent)

==== Fundraising ====
Campaign finance reports as of May 13, 2026
Candidate	Raised	Spent	Cash on hand
Josh Harder (D)	$3,714,506	$976,060	$4,427,277
John McBride (R)	$8,164	$6,869	$1,425
Parminder Singh (R)	$401	$329	$71
Source: Federal Election Commission

==== Results ====
Primary results
Party	Candidate	Votes	%
Democratic	Josh Harder (incumbent)	79,946	60.78
Republican	John McBride	30,625	23.28
Republican	Martin "Vmann" Veprauskas	9,813	7.46
Republican	Khalid Jeffrey Jafri	8,900	6.77
Republican	Parminder "Happy" Singh	2,247	1.71
Total votes		131,531	100.0

=== General election ===
==== Predictions ====
Source	Ranking	As of
Decision Desk HQ	Safe D	July 14, 2026
Inside Elections	Solid D	November 6, 2025
The Cook Political Report	Solid D	November 5, 2025
Sabato's Crystal Ball	Safe D	February 5, 2026
The Economist	Safe D	May 6, 2026

==== Fundraising ====
Campaign finance reports as of June 30, 2026
Candidate	Raised	Spent	Cash on hand
Josh Harder (D)	$4,083,528	$1,032,871	$4,739,488
John McBride (R)	$52,178	$33,569	$18,738
Source: Federal Election Commission

==== Results ====
2026 California's 9th congressional district election
Party	Candidate	Votes	%	±%
Democratic	Josh Harder (incumbent)			
Republican	John McBride			
Total votes				

== District 10 ==
2026 California's 10th congressional district election
- Reporting: 82% as of Nov 10 at 10:12 AM PST
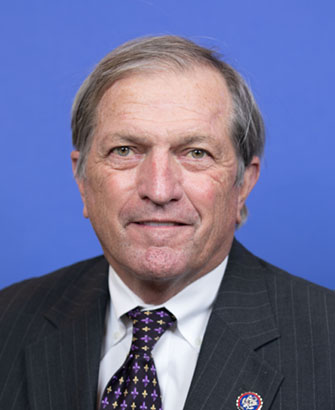

Candidate	Mark DeSaulnier	Jeff Frese
Party	Democratic	Republican
Popular vote	183,173	79,078
Percentage	69.8%	30.2%
U.S. representative before election
Mark DeSaulnier
Democratic
Elected U.S. representative
Mark DeSaulnier
Democratic

California's 10th congressional district boundary from the 2026 elections Interactive map version

The incumbent was Democrat Mark DeSaulnier who had represented the district since 2023 and was re-elected with 66.5% of the vote in 2024. DeSaulnier again won re-election.

=== Primary ===
==== Advanced to general ====
- Mark DeSaulnier (Democratic), incumbent U.S. representative
- Jeff Frese (Republican), business owner

==== Eliminated in primary ====
- Angela Griffiths (Republican), chiropractor
- Joshua Hamilton (Democratic), community organizer
- Mitchell Maisler (Democratic), brewer
- Katherine Piccinni (Republican), property manager and runner-up for this district in 2024 and write-in candidate in 2022
- Bob Rowland (Democratic), commercial land broker

==== Declined ====
- Steve Glazer (Democratic), former state senator from the 7th district (2015–2024) and candidate for California state controller in 2022 (endorsed DeSaulnier)
- Tim Grayson (Democratic), state senator from the 9th district (2024–present) (endorsed DeSaulnier)

==== Endorsements ====
Mark DeSaulnier (D)

U.S. senators

- Alex Padilla, California (2021–present)
- Adam Schiff, California (2024–present)

U.S. representatives

- Pete Aguilar, CA-33 (2015–present)
- Katherine Clark, House Minority Whip (2023–present) from MA-05 (2013–present)
- Rosa DeLauro, CT-03 (1991–present)
- Jared Huffman, CA-02 (2013–present)
- Hakeem Jeffries, House Minority Leader (2023–present) from NY-08 (2013–present)
- Zoe Lofgren, CA-18 (1995–present)
- Doris Matsui, CA-07 (2005–present)
- George Miller, former CA-11 (1975–2015)
- Kevin Mullin, CA-15 (2023–present)
- Nancy Pelosi, former speaker of the House (2007–2011, 2019–2023) from CA-11 (1987–present)
- Ayanna Pressley, MA-07 (2019–present)
- Jamie Raskin, MD-08 (2017–present)
- Eric Swalwell, former CA-14 (2013–2026)
- Mike Thompson, CA-04 (1999–present)

Statewide officials

- Rob Bonta, attorney general of California (2021–present)

State legislators

- Steve Glazer, former state senator from the 7th district (2015–2024)
- Tim Grayson, state senator from the 9th district (2024–present)

Labor unions

- California Federation of Labor Unions
- National Union of Healthcare Workers

Organizations

- California Environmental Voters
- Council on American–Islamic Relations Action
- J Street
- Planned Parenthood Action Fund
- Sierra Club

Political parties

- California Democratic Party

Newspapers

- Bay Area Reporter
- The Independent

==== Fundraising ====
Campaign finance reports as of May 13, 2026
Candidate	Raised	Spent	Cash on hand
Mark DeSaulnier (D)	$515,092	$516,173	$627,906
Angela Griffiths (R)	$9,352	$2,527	$6,825
Joshua Hamilton (D)	$7,091	$2,212	$4,879
Mitchell Maisler (D)	$10,048	$10,567	$0
Katherine Piccinni (R)	$19,848	$14,025	$7,905
Source: Federal Election Commission

==== Results ====
Primary results
Party	Candidate	Votes	%
Democratic	Mark DeSaulnier (incumbent)	132,246	59.68
Republican	Jeff Frese	28,671	12.94
Republican	Katherine Piccinini	25,487	11.50
Republican	Angela Griffiths	14,767	6.66
Democratic	Joshua Hamilton	8,797	3.97
Democratic	Mitchell Maisler	7,746	3.50
Democratic	Bob Rowland	3,867	1.75
Total votes		221,581	100.0

=== General election ===
==== Predictions ====
Source	Ranking	As of
Decision Desk HQ	Safe D	July 14, 2026
The Cook Political Report	Solid D	November 5, 2025
Inside Elections	Solid D	March 7, 2025
Sabato's Crystal Ball	Safe D	July 15, 2025
The Economist	Safe D	May 6, 2026

==== Fundraising ====
Campaign finance reports as of May 13, 2026
Candidate	Raised	Spent	Cash on hand
Mark DeSaulnier (D)	$515,092	$516,173	$627,906
Jeff Frese (R)	$0	$0	$0
Source: Federal Election Commission

==== Results ====
2026 California's 10th congressional district election
Party	Candidate	Votes	%	±%
Democratic	Mark DeSaulnier (incumbent)			
Republican	Jeff Frese			
Total votes				

== District 11 ==
2026 California's 11th congressional district election
- Reporting: 99% as of Nov 10 at 10:12 AM PST
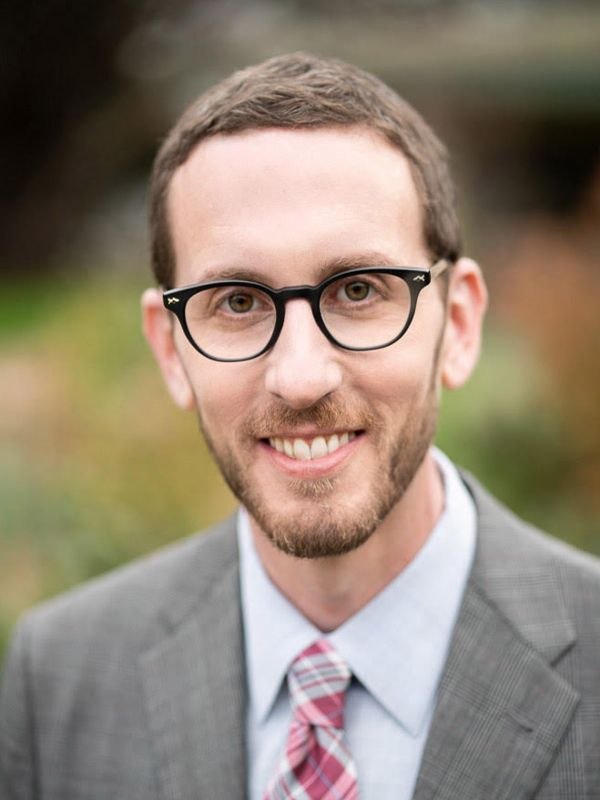

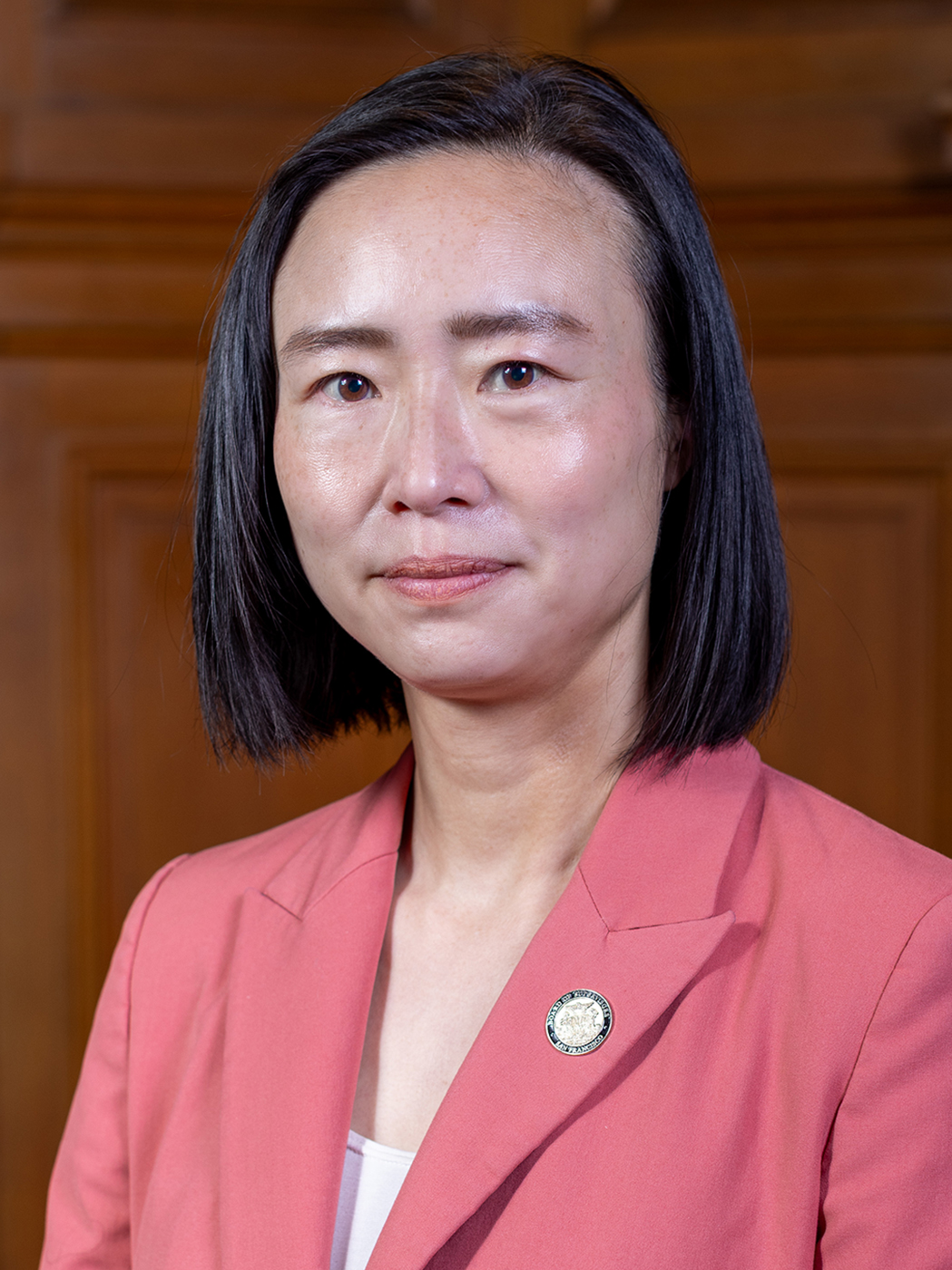
Candidate	Scott Wiener	Connie Chan
Party	Democratic	Democratic
Popular vote	159,265	138,829
Percentage	53.4%	46.6%
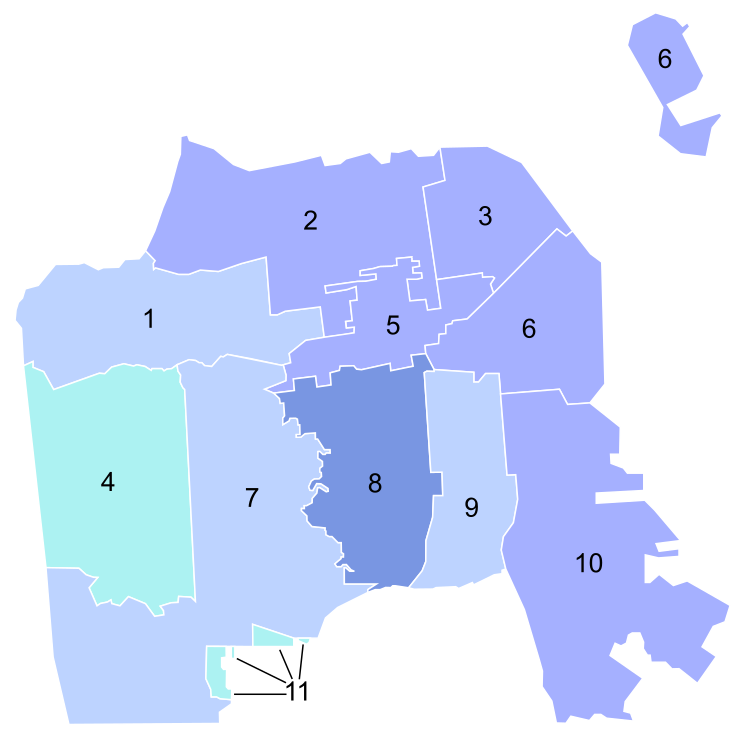
- Primary city-county supervisorial district results Wiener: 30–40% 40–50% 50–60% Chan: 30–40%
U.S. representative before election
Nancy Pelosi
Democratic
Elected U.S. representative
Scott Wiener
Democratic

California's 11th congressional district boundary from the 2026 elections Interactive map version

The incumbent was Democrat Nancy Pelosi, who was re-elected with 81.0% of the vote in 2024. In November 2025, Pelosi announced that she would not seek re-election. Two Democrats, Connie Chan and Scott Wiener, competed in the general election for the vacant seat. Wiener won the seat, with Chan conceding the race on November 4, 2026.

=== Primary ===
==== Advanced to general ====
- Connie Chan (Democratic), San Francisco supervisor from the 1st district (2021–present)
- Scott Wiener (Democratic), state senator from the 11th district (2016–present)

==== Eliminated in primary ====
- John "Gus" Buffler (Democratic), rocket scientist
- Saikat Chakrabarti (Democratic), think tank president and former chief of staff to U.S. representative Alexandria Ocasio-Cortez (endorsed Chan)
- Nathan Deer (No party preference), scientist
- Keith Freedman (Democratic), business owner
- David Ganezer (Republican), newspaper publisher
- Omed Hamid (Democratic), technology advocate
- Gregory M Haynes (Democratic), civil rights advocate
- Marie Hurabiell (Democratic), attorney
- Jingchao Xiong (Republican), marketing salesman and independent candidate for SD-11 in 2024

==== Withdrawn ====
- Daniel Wheeler (Democratic), lawyer and entrepreneur (endorsed Hurabiell)

==== Declined ====
- London Breed (Democratic), former mayor of San Francisco (2017–2018, 2018–2025) (endorsed Wiener)
- Matt Haney (Democratic), state assemblymember from the 17th district (2022–present) (running for re-election)
- Jane Kim (Democratic), executive director of the California Working Families Party, former San Francisco supervisor from the 6th district (2011–2019), runner-up for California's 11th senate district in 2016, and candidate for mayor of San Francisco in 2018 (running for insurance commissioner)
- Christine Pelosi (Democratic), political strategist and daughter of incumbent Nancy Pelosi (running for state senate)
- Nancy Pelosi (Democratic), incumbent U.S. representative (endorsed Chan)

==== Endorsements ====
Saikat Chakrabarti (D)

U.S. representatives

- Jamaal Bowman, former NY-16 (2021–2025)
- Ilhan Omar, MN-5 (2019–present)
- Rashida Tlaib, MI-12 (2019–present)

State legislators

- Chris Rabb, Pennsylvania state representative from the 200th district (2017–present)

Local officials

- Matt Gonzalez, former San Francisco supervisor from the 5th district (2001−2005)
- Honey Mahogany, former chair of the San Francisco Democratic Party (2021–2024)

Individuals

- Peaches Christ, drag performer
- Cameron Kasky, gun violence advocate
- Howie Klein, former president of Reprise Records (1989–2001) and adjunct professor at McGill University (deceased)
- Chi Ossé, New York City Councilmember
- Heather Digby Parton, political blogger
- Hasan Piker, left-wing political commentator

Organizations

- California College Democrats
- Center for Biological Diversity Action Fund
- Council on American–Islamic Relations Action (co-endorsement with Chan)
- Justice Democrats
- PAL PAC
- Peace Action
- Progressive Victory
- Track AIPAC
- Track Oil PACs
- US Campaign for Palestinian Rights Action
- Sunrise Movement
Connie Chan (D)

U.S. senators

- Adam Schiff, California (2024–present)

U.S. representatives

- Julia Brownley, CA-26 (2013–present)
- Judy Chu, CA-28 (2009–present)
- Lois Frankel, FL-22 (2013–present)
- Mike Honda, former CA-07 (2001–2017)
- Zoe Lofgren, CA-18 (1995–present)
- Grace Meng, NY-06 (2013–present)
- Nancy Pelosi, former speaker of the House (2007–2011, 2019–2023) from CA-11 (1987–present)
- Marilyn Strickland, WA-10 (2021–present)
- Jill Tokuda, HI-02 (2023–present)
- Norma Torres, CA-35 (2015–present)

State legislators

- Tom Ammiano, former state assemblymember (2008–2014)

Local officials

- Art Agnos, former mayor of San Francisco (1988–1992)
- Willie Brown, former mayor of San Francisco (1996–2004)
- Chyanne Chen, San Francisco supervisor from the 11th district (2025–present)
- Jackie Fielder, San Francisco supervisor from the 9th district (2025–present)
- Aaron Peskin, former San Francisco supervisor from the 3rd district (2001–2009; 2015–2025)
- Dean Preston, former San Francisco supervisor from the 5th district (2019–2025)

Individuals

- Cleve Jones, LGBT rights activist

Labor unions

- American Federation of Teachers 2121
- California Faculty Association
- California Federation of Teachers
- California Federation of Labor Unions
- California Teachers Association
- IAFF Local 798
- National Nurses United
- San Francisco Building and Construction Trades Council
- San Francisco Labor Council
- SEIU California
- SEIU United Healthcare Workers West
- UNITE HERE

Organizations

- ASPIRE PAC
- Council on American–Islamic Relations Action (co-endorsement with Chakrabarti)
- Elect Democratic Women
- Harvey Milk LGBTQ Democratic Club
- San Francisco League of Pissed Off Voters
- National Women's Political Caucus
- Progressive Democrats of America

Political parties

- California Working Families Party

Newspapers

- San Francisco Bay Guardian
- Sun-Reporter
Marie Hurabiell (D)

State legislators

- Quentin L. Kopp, former state senator from the 8th district (1986–1998)

Local officials

- Michela Alioto-Pier, former San Francisco supervisor from the 2nd district (2004–2011)

Individuals

- Daniel Wheeler, former candidate for this seat
Scott Wiener (D)

U.S. representatives

- Jake Auchincloss, MA-04 (2021–present)
- Laura Friedman, CA-30 (2025–present)
- Josh Harder, CA-09 (2019–present)
- Julie Johnson, TX-32 (2025–present)
- Sam Liccardo, CA-16 (2025–present)
- Scott Peters, CA-50 (2013–present)

Statewide officials

- Rob Bonta, attorney general of California (2021–present)
- Ricardo Lara, state insurance commissioner (2019–present)

State legislators

- Evan Low, former state assemblymember from the 26th district (2014–2024)
- Robert Rivas, speaker of the California State Assembly (2023–present) from the 29th district (2018–present)

Local officials

- London Breed, former mayor of San Francisco (2017–2018, 2018–2025)
- David Chiu, city attorney of San Francisco (2021–present)
- Matt Mahan, mayor of San Jose (2023–present)

Individuals

- Chris Larsen, business executive
- Garry Tan, venture capitalist

Labor unions

- California School Employees Association
- National Union of Healthcare Workers
- ~~SEIU California~~ (endorsement rescinded)
- ~~SEIU United Healthcare Workers West~~ (endorsement rescinded)
- Sheet Metal Workers Local 104
- International Union of Operating Engineers Local 3
- United Food and Commercial Workers Western States Council

Political parties

- California Democratic Party

Organizations

- Alice B. Toklas LGBTQ Democratic Club
- California Legislative LGBTQ Caucus
- Democrats for Education Reform
- Equality California
- Equality PAC
- GrowSF
- Human Rights Campaign
- J Street PAC
- LGBTQ Victory Fund
- Sierra Club

Newspapers

- Bay Area Reporter
- San Francisco Chronicle
- San Francisco Examiner

==== Fundraising ====
Campaign finance reports as of May 13, 2026
Candidate	Raised	Spent	Cash on hand
Saikat Chakrabarti (D)	$9,236,822 (Note: $8,821,000 of this total was self-funded by Chakrabarti.)	$8,851,942	$384,881
Connie Chan (D)	$649,305	$577,288	$72,017
Nathan Deer (I)	$3,987	$2,093	$1,895
David Ganezer (R)	$60	$45	$15
Omed Hamid (D)	$44,997	$34,968	$10,029
Marie Hurabiell (D)	$631,936	$492,766	$139,170
Scott Wiener (D)	$3,958,853	$2,675,276	$1,283,577
Source: Federal Election Commission

==== Polling ====
Poll source	Date(s) administered	Sample size	Margin of error	Saikat Chakrabarti (D)	Connie Chan (D)	David Ganezer (R)	Marie Hurabiell (D)	Scott Wiener (D)	Other	Undecided
EMC Research (D) (Note: Poll sponsored by Families for an Affordable San Francisco PAC, which supports Wiener)	May 3–7, 2026	542 (LV)	–	21%	22%	–	–	38%	–	19%
Lake Research Partners (D) (Note: Poll sponsored by Chan's campaign)	April 29 – May 3, 2026	500 (LV)	–	17%	20%	5%	4%	47%	–	5%
Sextant Strategies & Research (D) (Note: Poll sponsored by the San Francisco Chronicle)	April 28 – May 3, 2026	819 (LV)	± 3.0%	18%	17%	–	5%	40%	13% (Note: "Another candidate" with 13%)	7%
GQR (D) (Note: Poll commissioned by Public First Action, which supports Wiener)	April 8–14, 2026	500 (LV)	–	26%	11%	–	2%	44%	2% (Note: Omed Hamid (D) with 2%)	15%
Data for Progress (D) (Note: Poll sponsored by Chakrabarti's campaign)	April 3–8, 2026	537 (LV)	± 4.0%	28%	13%	7%	5%	33%	3% (Note: Gregory M. Haynes (D) with 2%; Jingchao Xiong (R) with 1%)	11%
Data for Progress (D)	March 3–12, 2026	797 (LV)	± 3.0%	20%	17%	–	–	32%	13%	18%
Data for Progress (D)	January 14–22, 2026	806 (LV)	± 3.0%	16%	17%	–	–	37%	14% (Note: "Another candidate" with 14%)	17%

Hypothetical polling

Poll source	Date(s) administered	Sample size	Margin of error	Saikat Chakrabarti (D)	Connie Chan (D)	David Ganezer (R)	Bruce Lou (R)	Christine Pelosi (D)	Nancy Pelosi (D)	Scott Wiener (D)	Undecided
EMC Research (D) (Note: Poll sponsored by Wiener's campaign)	September 14–18, 2025	500 (LV)	± 4.4%	13%	11%	–	11%	9%	–	53%	2%
Beacon Research (D)	September 12–20, 2025	600 (RV)	± 3.9%	29%	–	11%	–	–	46%	–	14%
Beacon Research (D)	September 12–20, 2025	600 (RV)	± 3.9%	34%	–	–	–	–	47%	–	19%

==== Results ====
Primary results
Party	Candidate	Votes	%
Democratic	Scott Wiener	95,816	40.71
Democratic	Connie Chan	69,899	29.70
Democratic	Saikat Chakrabarti	42,060	17.87
Democratic	Marie Hurabiell	9,410	4.00
Republican	David Ganezer	9,299	3.95
Republican	Jingchao Xiong	4,238	1.80
Democratic	Gregory Haynes	2,025	0.86
Democratic	John "Gus" Buffler	942	0.40
No party preference	Nathan Deer	649	0.28
Democratic	Keith Freedman	591	0.25
Democratic	Omed Hamid	401	0.17
Green	Michael A. Petrelis (write-in)	7	0.00
Total votes		235,337	100.0

=== General election ===
==== Post-primary endorsements ====
Connie Chan (D)

Executive branch officials

- Gary Locke, former Governor of Washington (1997–2005), ambassador to China (2011–2014) and former U.S. secretary of commerce (2009–2011)
- Robert Reich, former U.S. secretary of labor (1993–1997)

U.S. senators

- Barbara Boxer, former California (1993–2017)

U.S. representatives

- Jared Huffman, CA-02 (2013–present)
- Pramila Jayapal, WA-07 (2017–present)
- Ro Khanna, CA-17 (2017–present)
- Delia Ramirez, IL-03 (2023–present)
- Derek Tran, CA-45 (2025–present)

Statewide Officials

- William Tong, attorney general of Connecticut (2019–present)

Local Officials

- Jackie Speier, San Mateo County supervisor from the 1st district (2025–present) and former CA-14 (2008–2023)

Individuals

- Saikat Chakrabarti, think tank president, former chief of staff to U.S. representative Alexandria Ocasio-Cortez and former candidate for the seat
- Margaret Cho, comedian and actress
- Brewster Kahle, founder and chairperson of Internet Archive

Organizations

- A New Policy
- End Citizens United
- Food and Water Action
- IfNotNow Bay Area
- Indivisible SF
- Our Revolution
- PAL PAC
- Track AIPAC
Scott Wiener (D)

U.S. representatives

- Ami Bera, CA-06 (2013–present)
- Robert Garcia, CA-42 (2023–present)
- Jerry Nadler, NY-12 (1992–present)
- Katie Porter, former CA-47 (2019–2025)

Organizations

- Jewish Democratic Council of America
- Public First Action

Individuals

- Tom Steyer, businessman and environmental activist

==== Fundraising ====
Campaign finance reports as of October 14, 2026
Candidate	Raised	Spent	Cash on hand
Scott Wiener (D)	$5,808,855	$5,198,326	$611,039
Connie Chan (D)	$2,404,664	$1,822,859	$581,805
Source: Federal Election Commission

==== Polling ====
Poll source	Date(s) administered	Sample size	Margin of error	Scott Wiener (D)	Connie Chan (D)	Other	Undecided
RedBox Research (D)	October 20-23, 2026	856 (LV)	± 4.7%	46%	38%	9% (Note: "Someone else" with 5%; "Did not vote in this race" with 3%; "Prefer not to answer" with 1%)	8%
University of Southern California	October 16–19, 2026	454 (LV)	± 4.6%	51% (Note: With voters who lean towards a given candidate)	44%	5% (Note: "I do not plan to vote in this election" with 5%)	–
University of Southern California	October 16–19, 2026	454 (LV)	± 4.6%	47%	41%	3% (Note: "I do not plan to vote in this election" with 3%)	9%
Tavern Research (D) (Note: Poll sponsored by Jobs And Democracy super PAC, which supports Wiener)	September 15–17, 2026	658 (LV)	± 5.2%	45%	34%	–	21%
Tavern Research (D)	September 15–17, 2026	658 (LV)	± 5.2%	53%	–	47%	–
Lake Research Partners (D) (Note: Poll sponsored by Chan's campaign)	July 14–19, 2026	(LV)	–	45%	40%	–	11%

==== Results ====
2026 California's 11th congressional district election
Party	Candidate	Votes	%	±%
Democratic	Scott Wiener			
Democratic	Connie Chan			
Total votes				

== District 12 ==
2026 California's 12th congressional district election
- Reporting: 98% as of Nov 10 at 10:12 AM PST
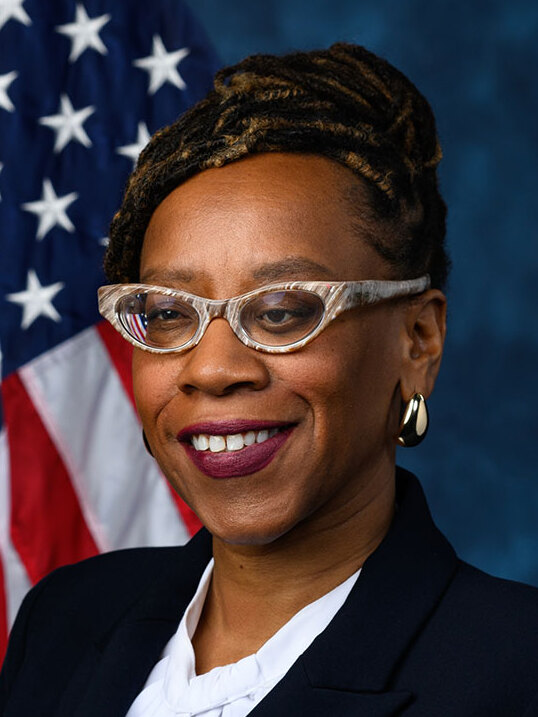

Candidate	Lateefah Simon	Jamie Joyce
Party	Democratic	Democratic
Popular vote	201,788	48,545
Percentage	80.6%	19.4%
U.S. representative before election
Lateefah Simon
Democratic
Elected U.S. representative
Lateefah Simon
Democratic

California's 12th congressional district boundary from the 2026 elections Interactive map version

The incumbent was Democrat Lateefah Simon who was elected with 65.4% of the vote in 2024 and won re-election.

=== Primary ===
==== Advanced to general ====
- Jamie Joyce (Democratic), nonprofit executive director
- Lateefah Simon (Democratic), incumbent U.S. representative

==== Endorsements ====
Lateefah Simon (D)

Labor unions

- California Federation of Labor Unions
- National Union of Healthcare Workers

Organizations

- California Environmental Voters
- Center for Biological Diversity Action Fund
- Council on American–Islamic Relations Action
- Elect Democratic Women
- Giffords
- J Street
- League of Conservation Voters Action Fund
- Our Revolution
- Planned Parenthood Action Fund
- Progressive Democrats of America
- Sierra Club
- Track AIPAC
- Vote Mama

Political parties

- California Democratic Party
- California Working Families Party

Newspapers

- Bay Area Reporter
- Sun-Reporter

==== Fundraising ====
Campaign finance reports as of May 13, 2026
Candidate	Raised	Spent	Cash on hand
Jamie Joyce (D)	$14,016	$8,950	$5,066
Lateefah Simon (D)	$1,262,755	$861,270	$687,140
Source: Federal Election Commission

==== Results ====
Primary results
Party	Candidate	Votes	%
Democratic	Lateefah Simon (incumbent)	153,190	84.24
Democratic	Jamie Joyce	28,372	15.60
Green	Steve Slauson (write-in)	279	0.15
Total votes		181,841	100.0

=== General election ===
==== Fundraising ====
Campaign finance reports as of May 13, 2026
Candidate	Raised	Spent	Cash on hand
Lateefah Simon (D)	$1,262,755	$861,270	$687,140
Jamie Joyce (D)	$14,016	$8,950	$5,066
Source: Federal Election Commission

==== Results ====
2026 California's 12th congressional district election
Party	Candidate	Votes	%	±%
Democratic	Lateefah Simon (incumbent)			
Democratic	Jamie Joyce			
Total votes				

== District 13 ==
2026 California's 13th congressional district election
- Reporting: 73% as of Nov 10 at 10:12 AM PST
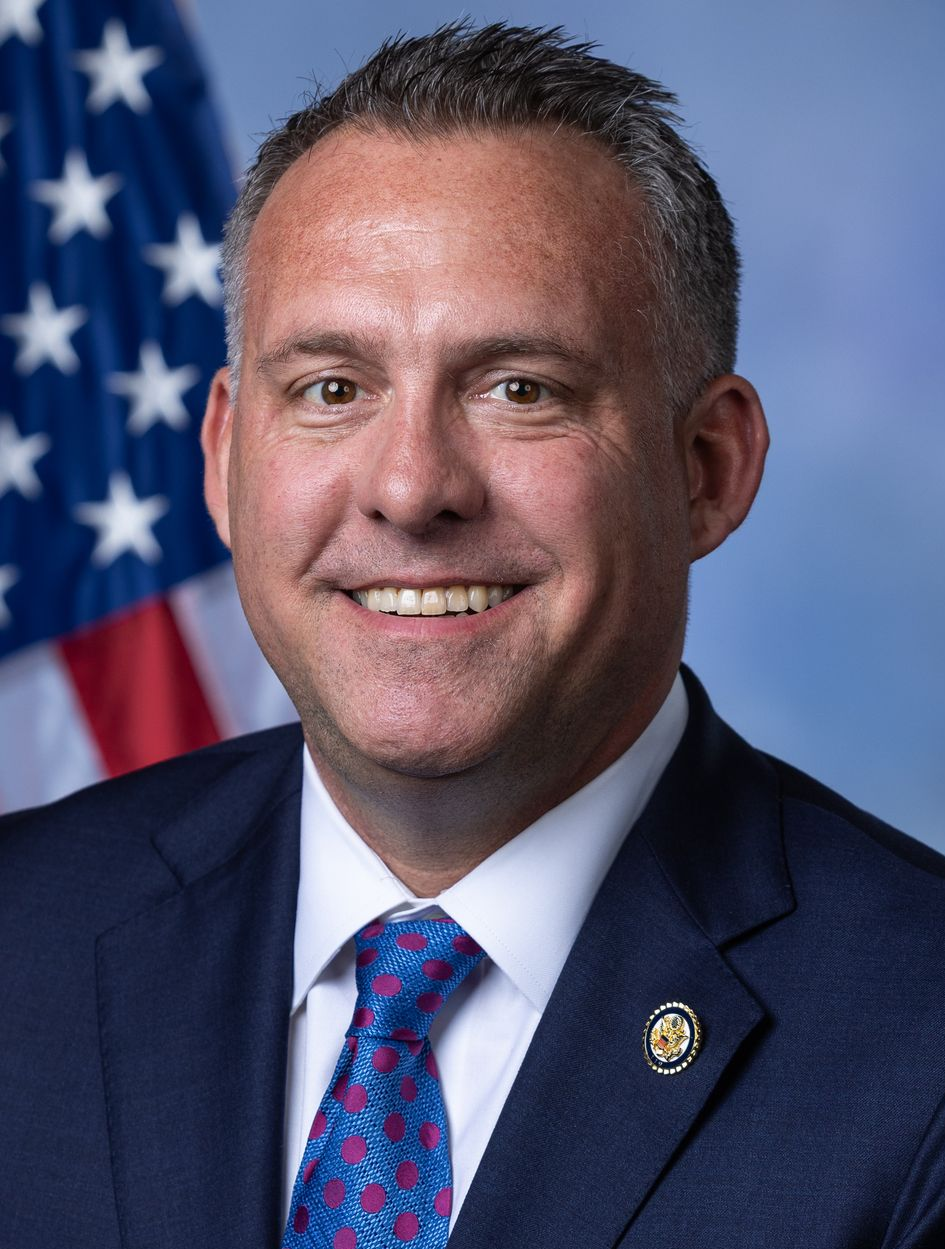

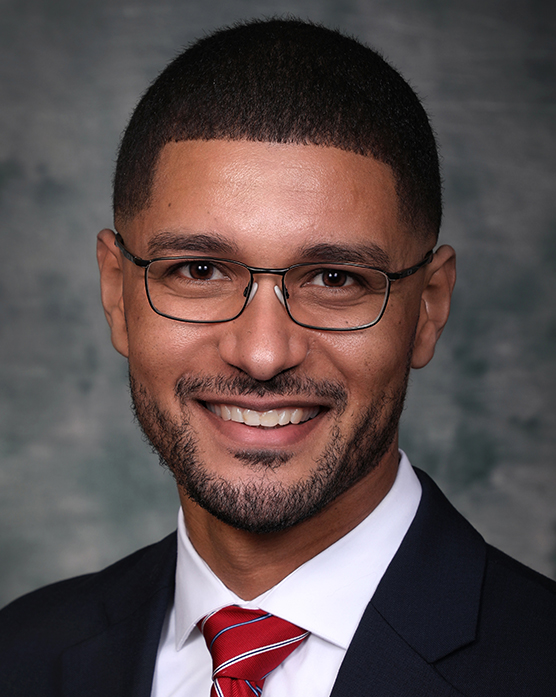
Candidate	Adam Gray	Kevin Lincoln
Party	Democratic	Republican
Popular vote	80,249	48,632
Percentage	62.3%	37.7%
U.S. representative before election
Adam Gray
Democratic
Elected U.S. representative
Adam Gray
Democratic

California's 13th congressional district boundary from the 2026 elections Interactive map version

The incumbent was Democrat Adam Gray, who flipped the district with 50.03% of the vote in 2024 and won re-election.

=== Primary ===
==== Advanced to general ====
- Adam Gray (Democratic), incumbent U.S. representative
- Kevin Lincoln (Republican), former mayor of Stockton (2021–2025) and runner-up for the 9th district in 2024 (previously ran in the 9th district)

==== Eliminated in primary ====
- Daniel Garibay Rodriguez (Democratic), community organizer
- Vin Kruttiventi (Republican), business consultant and runner-up for the 14th district in 2024

==== Withdrawn ====
- Javier Lopez (Republican), mayor of Ceres (2020–present)

==== Declined ====
- John Duarte (Republican), former U.S. representative

==== Endorsements ====
Adam Gray (D)

Labor unions

- California Federation of Labor Unions
- National Union of Healthcare Workers

Organizations

- AIPAC
- Democratic Majority for Israel
- End Citizens United
- Jewish Democratic Council of America
- Joint Action Committee for Political Affairs
- Planned Parenthood Action Fund
- Reproductive Freedom for All
- WelcomePAC

Political parties

- California Democratic Party
Kevin Lincoln (R)

Executive branch officials

- Donald Trump, president of the United States (2017–2021, 2025–present)

U.S. representatives

- John Duarte, former CA-13 (2023–2025) (previously endorsed Lopez)
- Jake Ellzey, TX-06 (2021–present)
- Tom Emmer, House Majority Whip (2023–present) from MN-06 (2015–present)
- Vince Fong, CA-20 (2024–present)
- Richard Hudson, NC-09 (2013–present)
- Mike Johnson, Speaker of the House (2023–present) from LA-04 (2017–present)
- Tom McClintock, CA-05 (2009–present)
- Doug Ose, former CA-03 (1999–2005)
- Guy Reschenthaler, PA-14 (2019–present)
- Steve Scalise, House Majority Leader (2023–present) from LA-01 (2008–present)

State legislators

- Carl DeMaio, state assemblymember from the 75th district (2024–present)

Organizations

- NRCC MAGA Majority
Javier Lopez (R) (withdrawn)

U.S. representatives

- Tom McClintock, CA-05 (2009–present)
- Doug LaMalfa, former CA-01 (2013–2026) (deceased)
- ~~John Duarte, CA-13 (2023–2025)~~ (switched endorsement to Lincoln)

==== Fundraising ====
Campaign finance reports as of May 13, 2026
Candidate	Raised	Spent	Cash on hand
Adam Gray (D)	$3,588,015	$2,035,689	$1,744,283
Vin Kruttiventi (R)	$2,179,472 (Note: 1,455,650 of this total was self-funded by Kruttiventi.)	$2,130,568	$54,704
Kevin Lincoln (R)	$1,461,225	$1,057,324	$428,025
Source: Federal Election Commission

==== Results ====
Primary results
Party	Candidate	Votes	%
Democratic	Adam Gray (incumbent)	41,086	41.97
Republican	Kevin Lincoln	27,157	27.74
Republican	Vin Kruttiventi	14,867	15.19
Democratic	Daniel Garibay Rodriguez	14,787	15.10
Total votes		97,897	100.0

=== General election ===
==== Endorsements ====
Adam Gray (D)

Organizations

- ~~MoveOn~~

==== Predictions ====
Source	Ranking	As of
Decision Desk HQ	Likely D	July 14, 2026
Inside Elections	Tilt D	November 6, 2025
The Cook Political Report	Likely D	October 23, 2026
Sabato's Crystal Ball	Likely D	October 20, 2026
The Economist	Likely D	May 6, 2026

==== Fundraising ====
Campaign finance reports as of May 13, 2026
Candidate	Raised	Spent	Cash on hand
Adam Gray (D)	$3,588,015	$2,035,689	$1,744,283
Kevin Lincoln (R)	$1,461,225	$1,057,324	$428,025
Source: Federal Election Commission

==== Results ====
2026 California's 13th congressional district election
Party	Candidate	Votes	%	±%
Democratic	Adam Gray (incumbent)			
Republican	Kevin Lincoln			
Total votes				

== District 14 ==
2026 California's 14th congressional district election
- Reporting: 91% as of Nov 9 at 6:03 PM PST
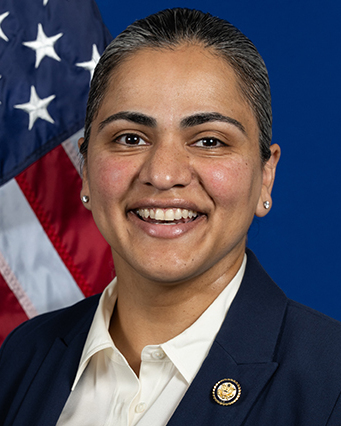

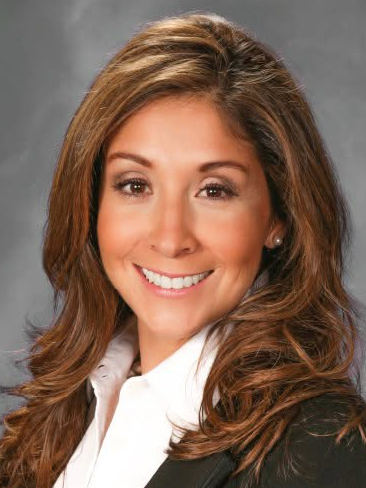
Candidate	Aisha Wahab	Melissa Hernandez
Party	Democratic	Democratic
Popular vote	120,060	88,461
Percentage	57.6%	42.4%
U.S. representative before election
Aisha Wahab
Democratic
Elected U.S. representative
Aisha Wahab
Democratic

California's 14th congressional district boundary from the 2026 elections Interactive map version

Democrat Eric Swalwell, who was re-elected with 67.8% of the vote in 2024, chose not to run for re-election, instead running in the 2026 California gubernatorial election, where he was a frontrunner until he suspended his campaign on April 12, 2026, following sexual assault allegations by multiple women. Two days later, after calls from fellow members of Congress, Swalwell resigned from the House.

A special election was held on June 16, 2026, to fill the vacant seat (under the district's 2024 boundaries), with a runoff on August 18, 2026. Democrat Aisha Wahab defeated Democrat Melissa Hernandez in the runoff, and was declared the winner of the special election. Wahab took office on September 2. She is the first Afghan American member of the United States Congress.

The regular primary election was held on June 2, 2026, and the regular general election was held on November 3, 2026. Wahab again faced Hernandez in the general election.

=== Primary ===
==== Advanced to general ====
- Aisha Wahab (Democratic), incumbent U.S. representative (2026–present)
- Melissa Hernandez (Democratic), president of the Bay Area Rapid Transit board of directors and former mayor of Dublin

==== Eliminated in primary ====
- Victor Aguilar Jr. (Democratic), San Leandro city councilor (2018–present)
- Suzanne Chenault (No party preference), lawyer
- Carin Elam (Democratic), nonprofit founder
- Wendy Huang (Republican), retired tech executive
- Matt Ortega (Democratic), digital director for the Hillary Clinton 2016 presidential campaign
- Rakhi Israni Singh (Democratic), attorney

==== Withdrawn ====
- Dena Maldonado (Republican), florist (remained on ballot)
- Abrar Qadir (Democratic), immigration attorney

==== Declined ====
- Steve Glazer (Democratic), former state senator from the 7th district (2015–2024) and candidate for California state controller in 2022
- Eric Swalwell (Democratic), former U.S. representative (2013–2026) (ran for governor, later withdrew)

==== Endorsements ====
Melissa Hernandez (D)

U.S. representatives

- Linda Sánchez, CA-38 (2003–present)
- Brad Schneider, IL-10 (2013-2015, 2017–present)
- Greg Stanton, AZ-04 (2019–present)
- Norma Torres, CA-35 (2015–present)

Organizations

- Congressional Hispanic Caucus BOLD PAC
- Elect Democratic Women
- New Democrat Coalition Action Fund
Wendy Huang (R)

Organizations

- California Rifle and Pistol Association
- Howard Jarvis Taxpayers Association
Rakhi Israni (D)

U.S. representatives

- Raja Krishnamoorthi, IL-08 (2017–present)

Local officials

- Jeffrey F. Rosen, Santa Clara County District Attorney (2011–present)
Matt Ortega (D)

Newspapers

- Bay Area Reporter

Organizations

- Progressive Victory
Aisha Wahab (D)

U.S. representatives

- Greg Casar, TX-35 (2023–present)
- Maxwell Frost, FL-10 (2023–present)
- Robert Garcia, CA-42 (2023–present)
- Pramila Jayapal, WA-07 (2017–present)
- Kevin Mullin, CA-15 (2023–present)
- Lateefah Simon, CA-12 (2025–present)

Statewide officials

- Eleni Kounalakis, lieutenant governor of California
- Rob Bonta, attorney general of California

State legislators

- Laura Richardson, state senator from SD-16 (2024–present)
- Bob Wieckowski, former state senator from SD-10 (2014–2022)

Labor unions

- California Faculty Association
- California Federation of Labor Unions
- California Teachers Association
- International Union of Operating Engineers Local 3
- National Nurses United
- National Union of Healthcare Workers
- SEIU California
- SEIU Local 521
- SEIU United Healthcare Workers West

Organizations

- California Young Democrats
- Council on American–Islamic Relations Action
- Courage California
- Congressional Progressive Caucus PAC
- Equality California
- J Street
- National Women's Political Caucus
- Our Revolution
- Progressive Democrats of America

Political parties

- California Democratic Party
- California Working Families Party

Newspapers

- East Bay Times
- The Independent
- The Mercury News
- San Francisco Chronicle

==== Fundraising ====
Campaign finance reports as of May 13, 2026
Candidate	Raised	Spent	Cash on hand
Carin Elam (D)	$30,896	$29,664	$1,382
Melissa Hernandez (D)	$440,558	$198,068	$242,490
Wendy Huang (R)	$31,483	$23,954	$7,529
Rakhi Israni (D)	$2,177,684	$1,059,829	$1,117,856
Matt Ortega (D)	$33,626	$28,203	$5,423
Aisha Wahab (D)	$421,287	$197,544	$223,743
Source: Federal Election Commission

==== Results ====
Primary results
Party	Candidate	Votes	%
Democratic	Aisha Wahab	59,238	38.28
Democratic	Melissa Hernandez	26,579	17.18
Republican	Wendy Huang	20,354	13.15
Democratic	Rakhi Israni Singh	20,041	12.95
Republican	Dena Maldonado (withdrawn)	18,788	12.14
Democratic	Victor Aguilar Jr.	3,276	2.12
Democratic	Matt Ortega	2,612	1.69
Democratic	Carin Elam	2,160	1.40
No party preference	Suzanne Chenault	1,699	1.10
Total votes		154,747	100.0

=== General election ===
==== Post-primary endorsements ====
Aisha Wahab (D)

Statewide officials

- Gavin Newsom, governor of California (2019–present)

U.S. Senators

- Bernie Sanders, Vermont (2007–present) (Independent)

Organizations

- Indivisible
- Sierra Club
Melissa Hernandez (D)

Organizations

- Democratic Majority for Israel

==== Fundraising ====
Campaign finance reports as of October 14, 2026
Candidate	Raised	Spent	Cash on hand
Aisha Wahab (D)	$1,214,547	$752,225	$462,322
Melissa Hernandez (D)	$2,112,674	$2,004,315	$108,358
Source: Federal Election Commission

==== Forum ====
2026 California's 14th congressional district blanket primary candidate forum
No.	Date	Host	Moderator	Link	Democratic	Independent	Democratic	Democratic	Republican	Democratic	Republican	Democratic	Democratic
Key: P Participant A Absent N Not invited I Invited W Withdrawn													
Key: P Participant A Absent N Not invited I Invited W Withdrawn					Victor Aguilar Jr.	Suzanne Chenault	Carin Elam	Melissa Hernandez	Wendy Huang	Rakhi Israni	Dena Maldonado	Matt Ortega	Aisha Wahab
1	April 12, 2026	Livermore Vine; Pleasanton Weekly	Jeremy Walsh; Gina Channell Wilcox	Pleasanton Weekly	A	A	P	P	P	P	W	P	P

==== Polling ====
Poll source	Date(s) administered	Sample size	Margin of error	Victor Aguilar Jr. (D)	Suzanne Chenault (I)	Carin Elam (D)	Melissa Hernandez (D)	Wendy Huang (R)	Dena Maldonado (R)	Matt Ortega (D)	Rakhi Singh (D)	Aisha Wahab (D)	Undecided
David Binder Research (Note: Poll sponsored by the Working Families Party)	April 1–4, 2026	(LV)	–	1%	1%	0%	9%	9%	8%	2%	2%	29%	38%

==== Results ====
2026 California's 14th congressional district election
Party	Candidate	Votes	%	±%
Democratic	Aisha Wahab (incumbent)			
Democratic	Melissa Hernandez			
Total votes				

== District 15 ==
2026 California's 15th congressional district election
- Reporting: 83% as of Nov 10 at 10:12 AM PST
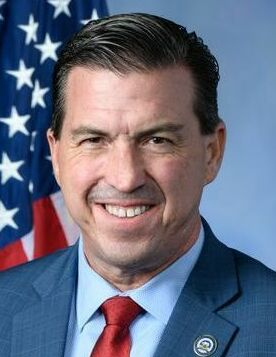

Candidate	Kevin Mullin	Charles Hoelter
Party	Democratic	Republican
Popular vote	164,963	42,927
Percentage	79.4%	20.6%
U.S. representative before election
Kevin Mullin
Democratic
Elected U.S. representative
Kevin Mullin
Democratic

California's 15th congressional district boundary from the 2026 elections Interactive map version

The incumbent was Democrat Kevin Mullin who had represnted the district since 2023 and was re-elected with 73.1% of the vote in 2024. Mullin again won re-election.

=== Primary ===
==== Advanced to general ====
- Charles Hoelter (Republican), retired training supervisor
- Kevin Mullin (Democratic), incumbent U.S. representative

==== Eliminated in primary ====
- Anthony Dang (Democratic), policy analyst
- Jim Garrity (No party preference), retired police inspector
- Mantosh Kumar (Democratic), former business executive and independent strategic advisor

==== Endorsements ====
Kevin Mullin (D)

Labor unions

- California Federation of Labor Unions
- National Union of Healthcare Workers

Organizations

- California Environmental Voters
- Democratic Majority for Israel
- Jewish Democratic Council of America
- J Street
- Planned Parenthood Action Fund
- Sierra Club

Political parties

- California Democratic Party

Newspapers

- Bay Area Reporter
- San Francisco Examiner
- San Mateo Daily Journal

==== Fundraising ====
Campaign finance reports as of May 13, 2026
Candidate	Raised	Spent	Cash on hand
Mantosh Kumar (D)	$22,062	$11,843	$10,218
Kevin Mullin (D)	$720,687	$568,916	$203,542
Anthony Van Dang (D)	$12,863	$132	$3,602
Source: Federal Election Commission

==== Results ====
Primary results
Party	Candidate	Votes	%
Democratic	Kevin Mullin (incumbent)	107,496	65.03
Republican	Charles Hoelter	30,476	18.44
Democratic	Anthony Van Dang	13,226	8.00
Democratic	Mantosh Kumar	7,981	4.83
No party preference	Jim Garrity	6,126	3.71
Total votes		165,305	100.0

=== General election ===
==== Predictions ====
Source	Ranking	As of
Decision Desk HQ	Safe D	July 14, 2026
The Cook Political Report	Solid D	November 5, 2025
Inside Elections	Solid D	March 7, 2025
Sabato's Crystal Ball	Safe D	July 15, 2025
The Economist	Safe D	May 6, 2026

==== Fundraising ====
Campaign finance reports as of May 13, 2026
Candidate	Raised	Spent	Cash on hand
Kevin Mullin (D)	$720,687	$568,916	$203,542
Charles Hoelter (R)	$0	$0	$0
Source: Federal Election Commission

==== Results ====
2026 California's 15th congressional district election
Party	Candidate	Votes	%	±%
Democratic	Kevin Mullin (incumbent)			
Republican	Charles Hoelter			
Total votes				

== District 16 ==
2026 California's 16th congressional district election
- Reporting: 76% as of Nov 10 at 10:12 AM PST
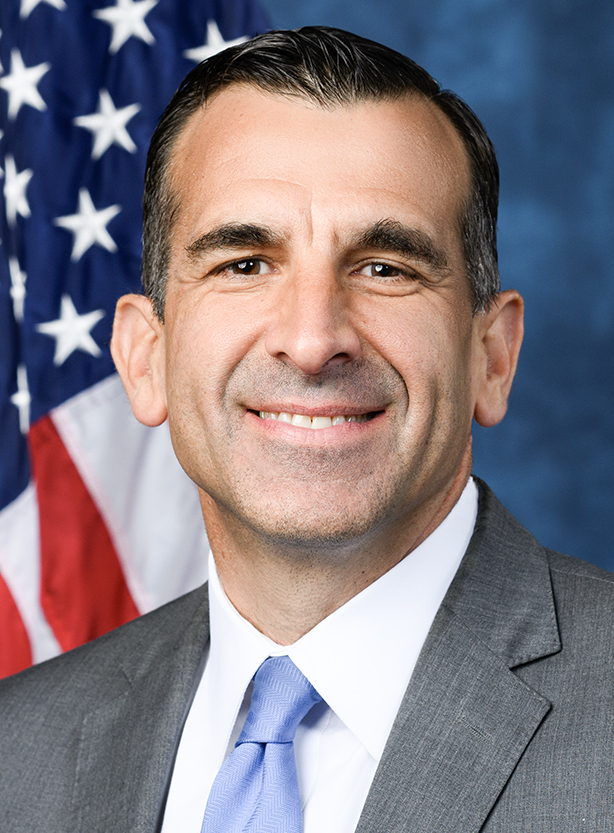

Candidate	Sam Liccardo	Peter Sundin Soulé
Party	Democratic	Republican
Popular vote	182,321	52,923
Percentage	77.5%	22.5%
U.S. representative before election
Sam Liccardo
Democratic
Elected U.S. representative
Sam Liccardo
Democratic

California's 16th congressional district boundary from the 2026 elections Interactive map version

The incumbent was Democrat Sam Liccardo who was elected with 58.22% of the vote in 2024 and won re-election.

=== Primary ===
==== Advanced to general ====
- Sam Liccardo (Democratic), incumbent U.S. representative
- Peter Sundin Soulé (Republican), investor

==== Eliminated in primary ====
- Kevin Johnson (Republican), law student
- Jotham Stein (No party preference), attorney

==== Withdrawn ====
- Peter Dixon (Democratic), cybersecurity executive and candidate for this district in 2024

==== Endorsements ====
Sam Liccardo (D)

Organizations

- California Environmental Voters
- California Young Democrats
- Council on American–Islamic Relations Action
- Equality California
- J Street
- Leading the Future
- League of Conservation Voters Action Fund
- Planned Parenthood Action Fund
- Sierra Club

Political parties

- California Democratic Party

Newspapers

- Bay Area Reporter
- Los Altos Town Crier
- San Mateo Daily Journal
Declined to endorse

Labor unions

- California Federation of Labor Unions

==== Fundraising ====
Campaign finance reports as of May 13, 2026
Candidate	Raised	Spent	Cash on hand
Sam Liccardo (D)	$3,278,888	$1,343,778	$2,025,502
Jotham Stein (I)	$67,019	$53,927	$14,992
Source: Federal Election Commission

==== Results ====
Primary results
Party	Candidate	Votes	%
Democratic	Sam Liccardo (incumbent)	139,399	75.61
Republican	Peter Sundin Soulé	19,841	10.76
Republican	Kevin Johnson	18,807	10.20
No party preference	Jotham Stein	6,319	3.43
Total votes		184,366	100.0

=== General election ===
==== Predictions ====
Source	Ranking	As of
Decision Desk HQ	Safe D	July 14, 2026
The Cook Political Report	Solid D	November 5, 2025
Inside Elections	Solid D	March 7, 2025
Sabato's Crystal Ball	Safe D	July 15, 2025
The Economist	Safe D	May 6, 2026

==== Fundraising ====
Campaign finance reports as of May 13, 2026
Candidate	Raised	Spent	Cash on hand
Sam Liccardo (D)	$3,278,888	$1,343,778	$2,025,502
Peter Sundin Soulé (R)	$0	$0	$0
Source: Federal Election Commission

==== Results ====
2026 California's 16th congressional district election
Party	Candidate	Votes	%	±%
Democratic	Sam Liccardo (incumbent)			
Republican	Peter Sundin Soulé			
Total votes				

== District 17 ==
2026 California's 17th congressional district election
- Reporting: 79% as of Nov 9 at 6:03 PM PST
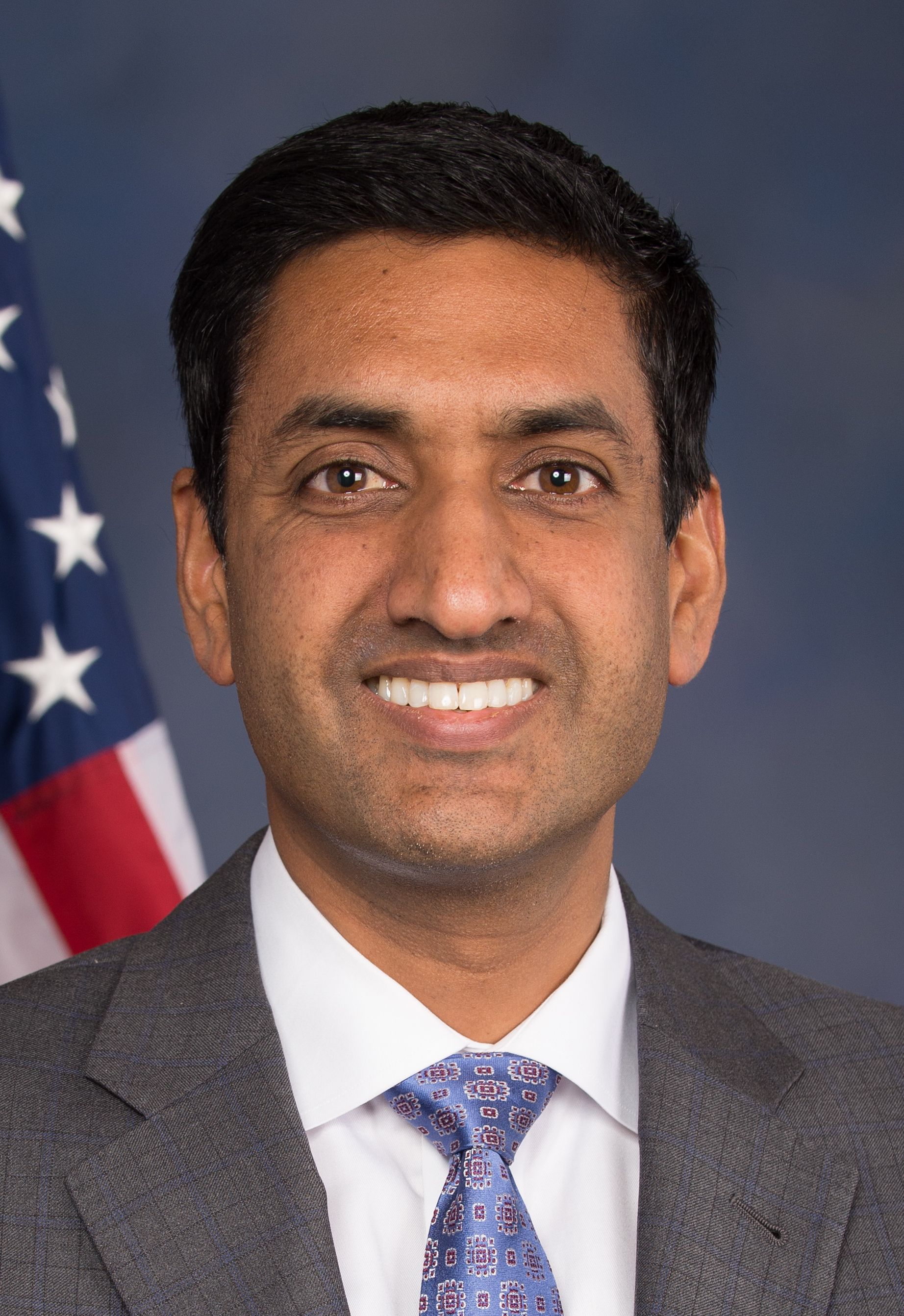

Candidate	Ro Khanna	Ritesh Tandon
Party	Democratic	Republican
Popular vote	131,574	50,553
Percentage	72.2%	27.8%
U.S. representative before election
Ro Khanna
Democratic
Elected U.S. representative
Ro Khanna
Democratic

California's 17th congressional district boundary from the 2026 elections Interactive map version

The incumbent was Democrat Ro Khanna who had represented the district since 2015 and was re-elected with 67.7% of the vote in 2024. Khanna again won re-election.

=== Primary ===
==== Advanced to general ====
- Ro Khanna (Democratic), incumbent U.S. representative
- Ritesh Tandon (Republican), tech executive and perennial candidate

==== Eliminated in primary ====
- Ethan Agarwal (Democratic), tech entrepreneur
- Joe Dehn (Libertarian), Santa Clara County Libertarian Party chairperson and perennial candidate
- Mike Katz (Democratic), cybersecurity engineer
- Jennie Ha Phan (Republican), retired accountant

==== Declined ====
- Eric Jones (Democratic), venture capitalist (running in the 4th district)
- Matt Mahan (Democratic), mayor of San Jose (2023–present) (ran for governor)

==== Endorsements ====
Ethan Agarwal (D)

U.S. representatives

- Mike Honda, former CA-17 (2001–2017)

Individuals

- Ron Conway, venture capitalist
- Andy Fang, co-founder of DoorDash
- Garry Tan, venture capitalist
Ro Khanna (D)

Labor unions

- AFL-CIO Alameda County
- AFL-CIO South Bay Labor Council
- California Federation of Labor Unions
- California Federation of Teachers
- California School Employees Association
- CWA District 9
- IBEW Local 332
- National Nurses United
- National Union of Healthcare Workers
- Teamsters Joint Council 7
- UAW Region 6 CA

Organizations

- California Environmental Voters
- California Young Democrats
- Council on American–Islamic Relations Action
- Emgage Action
- End Citizens United
- Equality California
- Feminist Majority PAC
- Food & Water Action
- Humane World Action Fund
- J Street
- Justice Democrats
- Peace Action
- Planned Parenthood Action Fund
- Progressive Democrats of America
- Progressive Victory
- Sierra Club
- Track AIPAC

Political parties

- California Democratic Party
- California Working Families Party

Newspapers

- Bay Area Reporter

==== Fundraising ====
Campaign finance reports as of May 13, 2026
Candidate	Raised	Spent	Cash on hand
Ethan Agarwal (D)	$676,213	$473,544	$202,668
Mike Katz (D)	$6,162	$3,713	$2,449
Ro Khanna (D)	$12,643,779	$6,615,233	$16,737,637
Ritesh Tandon (R)	$33,733	$26,645	$7,088
Source: Federal Election Commission

==== Results ====
Primary results
Party	Candidate	Votes	%
Democratic	Ro Khanna (incumbent)	83,051	62.30
Republican	Ritesh Tandon	19,793	14.85
Republican	Jennie Ha Phan	14,282	10.71
Democratic	Ethan Agarwal	8,658	6.49
Democratic	Mike Katz	6,382	4.79
Libertarian	Joe Dehn	1,152	0.86
Total votes		133,318	100.0

=== General election ===
==== Predictions ====
Source	Ranking	As of
Decision Desk HQ	Safe D	July 14, 2026
The Cook Political Report	Solid D	November 5, 2025
Inside Elections	Solid D	March 7, 2025
Sabato's Crystal Ball	Safe D	July 15, 2025
The Economist	Safe D	May 6, 2026

==== Fundraising ====
Campaign finance reports as of May 13, 2026
Candidate	Raised	Spent	Cash on hand
Ro Khanna (D)	$12,643,779	$6,615,233	$16,737,637
Ritesh Tandon (R)	$33,733	$26,645	$7,088
Source: Federal Election Commission

==== Results ====
2026 California's 17th congressional district election
Party	Candidate	Votes	%	±%
Democratic	Ro Khanna (incumbent)			
Republican	Ritesh Tandon			
Total votes				

== District 18 ==
2026 California's 18th congressional district election
- Reporting: 79% as of Nov 10 at 10:12 AM PST
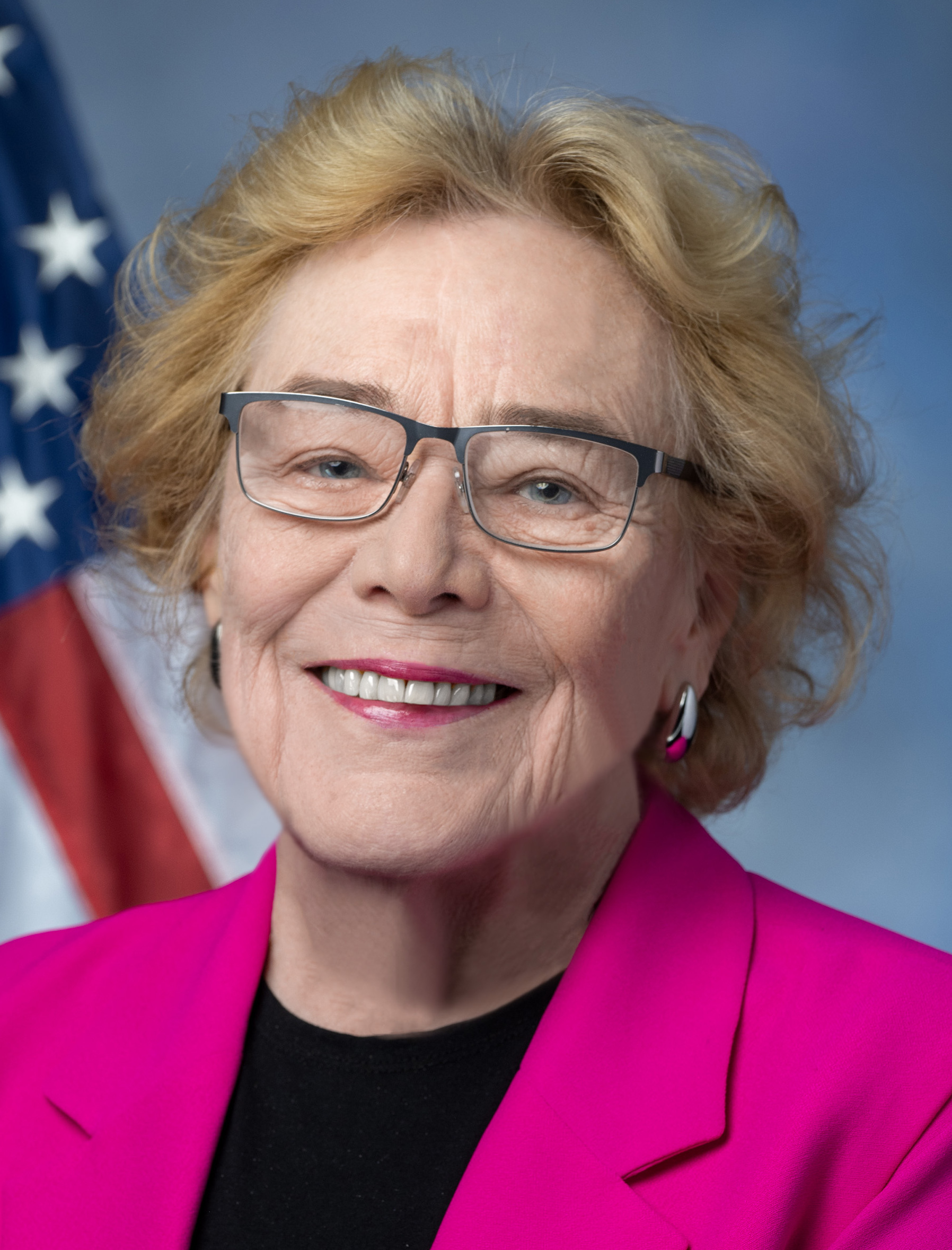

Candidate	Zoe Lofgren	Shane Lewis
Party	Democratic	Republican
Popular vote	118,251	44,409
Percentage	72.7%	27.3%
U.S. representative before election
Zoe Lofgren
Democratic
Elected U.S. representative
Zoe Lofgren
Democratic

California's 18th congressional district boundary from the 2026 elections Interactive map version

The incumbent was Democrat Zoe Lofgren who had represented the district since 2023 was re-elected with 64.6% of the vote in 2024. Lofgren again won re-election.

=== Primary ===
==== Advanced to general ====
- Shane Lewis (Republican), U.S. Marine veteran
- Zoe Lofgren (Democratic), incumbent U.S. representative

==== Eliminated in primary ====
- Luis Arreguín (Democratic), college professor
- Chris Demers (No party preference), sustainable technology director

==== Endorsements ====
Chris Demers (I)

Political parties

- Forward Party
Shane Lewis (R)

Political parties

- California Republican Party
Zoe Lofgren (D)

Labor unions

- California Federation of Labor Unions
- National Union of Healthcare Workers

Organizations

- California Environmental Voters
- Center for Biological Diversity Action Fund
- Council on American–Islamic Relations Action
- J Street
- Planned Parenthood Action Fund
- Sierra Club

Political parties

- California Democratic Party

Newspapers

- Bay Area Reporter

==== Fundraising ====
Campaign finance reports as of May 13, 2026
Candidate	Raised	Spent	Cash on hand
Luis Arreguin (D)	$18,369	$15,793	$8,494
Chris Demers (I)	$93,650	$53,919	$39,732
Shane Lewis (R)	$44,871	$39,077	$16,397
Zoe Lofgren (D)	$1,613,682	$1,237,078	$616,356
Source: Federal Election Commission

==== Results ====
Primary results
Party	Candidate	Votes	%
Democratic	Zoe Lofgren (incumbent)	65,291	54.86
Republican	Shane Lewis	34,883	29.31
Democratic	Luis Arreguín	15,384	12.93
No party preference	Chris Demers	3,447	2.90
Total votes		119,005	100.0

=== General election ===
==== Predictions ====
Source	Ranking	As of
Decision Desk HQ	Safe D	July 14, 2026
The Cook Political Report	Solid D	November 5, 2025
Inside Elections	Solid D	March 7, 2025
Sabato's Crystal Ball	Safe D	July 15, 2025
The Economist	Safe D	May 6, 2026

==== Fundraising ====
Campaign finance reports as of May 13, 2026
Candidate	Raised	Spent	Cash on hand
Zoe Lofgren (D)	$1,613,682	$1,237,078	$616,356
Shane Lewis (R)	$44,871	$39,793	$5,077
Source: Federal Election Commission

==== Results ====
2026 California's 18th congressional district election
Party	Candidate	Votes	%	±%
Democratic	Zoe Lofgren (incumbent)			
Republican	Shane Lewis			
Total votes				

== District 19 ==
2026 California's 19th congressional district election
- Reporting: 79% as of Nov 9 at 6:03 PM PST
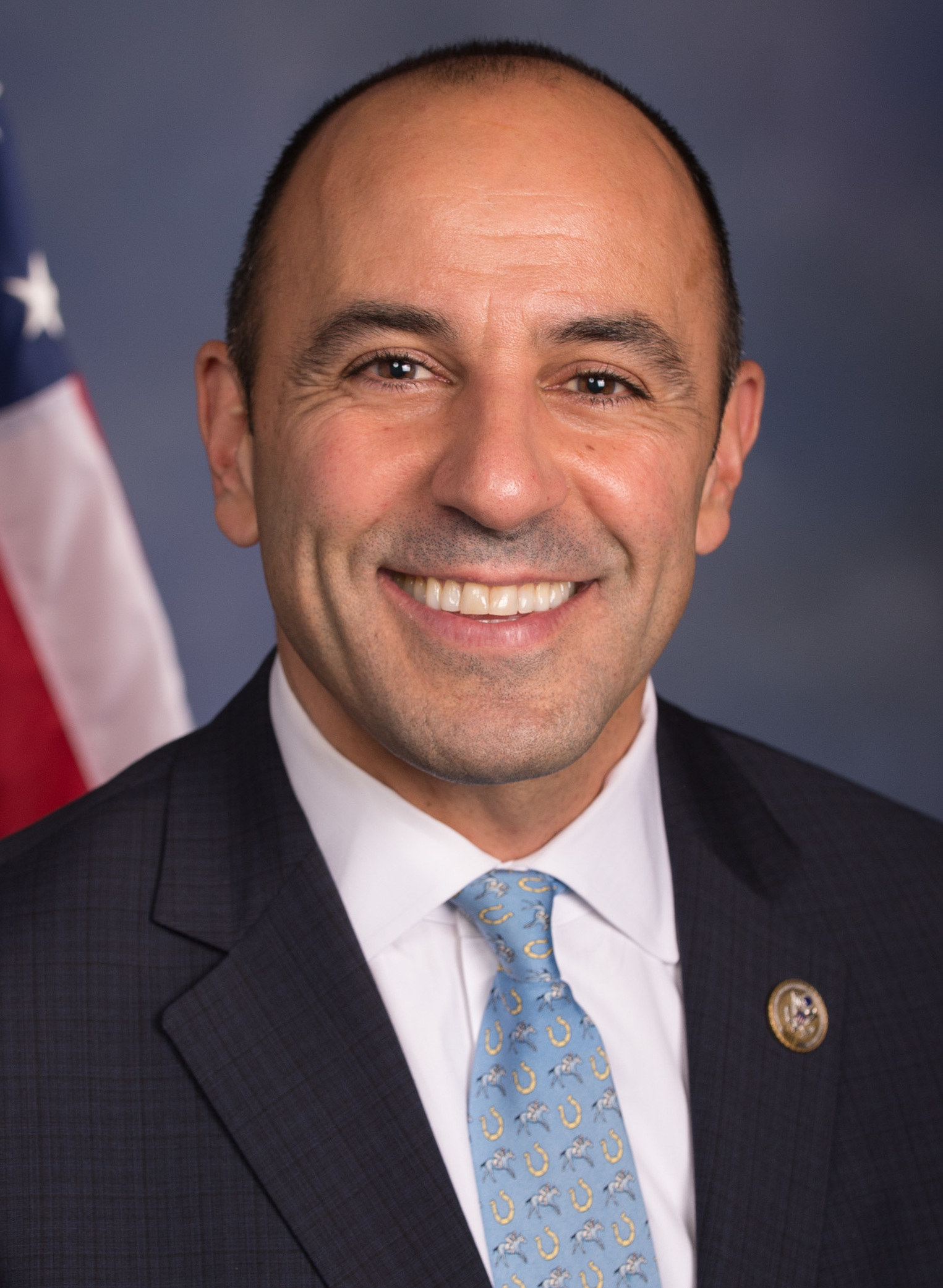

Candidate	Jimmy Panetta	Peter Verbica
Party	Democratic	Republican
Popular vote	192,571	71,217
Percentage	73.0%	27.0%
U.S. representative before election
Jimmy Panetta
Democratic
Elected U.S. representative
Jimmy Panetta
Democratic

California's 19th congressional district boundary from the 2026 elections Interactive map version

The incumbent was Democrat Jimmy Panetta who had represented the district since 2023 and was re-elected with 69.3% of the vote in 2024. Panetta again won re-election.

=== Primary ===
==== Advanced to general ====
- Jimmy Panetta (Democratic), incumbent U.S. representative
- Peter Verbica (Republican), financial planner

==== Eliminated in primary ====
- Ana Luz Acevedo-Cabrera (No party preference), professor
- Thomas Coxe (No party preference), contractor
- Sean Dougherty (Democratic), software engineer and Green Party candidate for this district in 2024
- Tuka Gafari (Republican), businessman
- Lars Mapstead (Libertarian), businessman

==== Endorsements ====
Sean Dougherty (D)

Organizations

- Central Coast Democratic Socialists of America
- Council on American–Islamic Relations Action
- Track AIPAC
Jimmy Panetta (D)

U.S. representatives

- Salud Carbajal, CA-24 (2017–present)
- Ro Khanna, CA-17 (2017–present)
- Sam Liccardo, CA-16 (2025–present)
- Zoe Lofgren, CA-18 (1994–present)

State legislators

- Robert Rivas, speaker of the California Assembly (2023–present) from AD-29 (2018–present)

Labor unions

- California Federation of Labor Unions
- National Union of Healthcare Workers

Organizations

- AIPAC
- California Environmental Voters
- Democratic Majority for Israel
- Planned Parenthood Action Fund
- Sierra Club
- VoteVets

Political parties

- California Democratic Party

Newspapers

- Santa Cruz Sentinel

==== Fundraising ====
Campaign finance reports as of May 13, 2026
Candidate	Raised	Spent	Cash on hand
Sean Dougherty (D)	$135,972	$126,976	$6,015
Jimmy Panetta (D)	$2,440,228	$1,304,898	$4,849,968
Peter Verbica (R)	$68,844	$50,842	$18,002
Source: Federal Election Commission

==== Results ====
Primary results
Party	Candidate	Votes	%
Democratic	Jimmy Panetta (incumbent)	127,294	58.43
Republican	Peter Coe Verbica	44,590	20.47
Democratic	Sean Dougherty	25,052	11.50
Republican	Tuka Gafari	13,715	6.30
No party preference	Ana Luz Acevedo-Cabrera	3,496	1.60
Libertarian	Lars Mapstead	2,615	1.20
No party preference	Thomas Coxe	1,078	0.49
Total votes		217,840	100.0

=== General election ===
==== Predictions ====
Source	Ranking	As of
Decision Desk HQ	Safe D	July 14, 2026
The Cook Political Report	Solid D	November 5, 2025
Inside Elections	Solid D	March 7, 2025
Sabato's Crystal Ball	Safe D	July 15, 2025
The Economist	Safe D	May 6, 2026

==== Post-primary endorsements ====
Jimmy Panetta (D)

Organizations

- U.S. Chamber of Commerce

==== Fundraising ====
Campaign finance reports as of May 13, 2026
Candidate	Raised	Spent	Cash on hand
Jimmy Panetta (D)	$2,440,228	$1,304,898	$4,849,968
Peter Verbica (R)	$68,844	$50,842	$18,002
Source: Federal Election Commission

==== Results ====
2026 California's 19th congressional district election
Party	Candidate	Votes	%	±%
Democratic	Jimmy Panetta (incumbent)			
Republican	Peter Verbica			
Total votes				

== District 20 ==
2026 California's 20th congressional district election
- Reporting: 71% as of Nov 10 at 10:12 AM PST
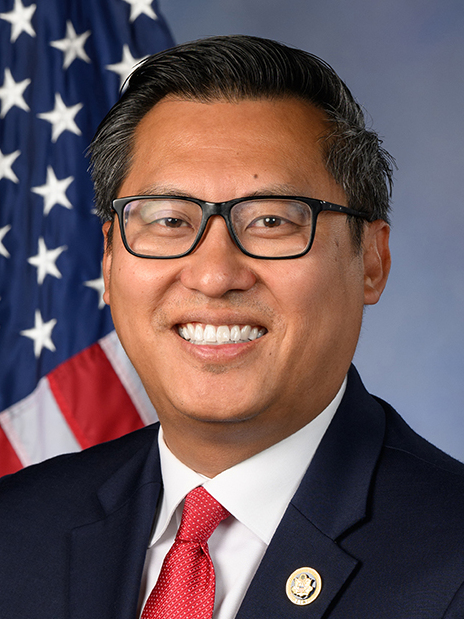

Candidate	Vince Fong	Sandra Van Scotter
Party	Republican	Democratic
Popular vote	125,298	78,154
Percentage	61.6%	38.4%
U.S. representative before election
Vince Fong
Republican
Elected U.S. representative
Vince Fong
Republican

California's 20th congressional district boundary from the 2026 elections Interactive map version

The incumbent was Republican Vince Fong who had been elected in a 2024 special election and was re-elected with 65.1% of the vote in the 2024 general election. Fong again won re-election.

=== Primary ===
==== Advanced to general ====
- Vince Fong (Republican), incumbent U.S. representative
- Sandra Van Scotter (Democratic), community activist

==== Eliminated in primary ====
- Ben Dewell (No party preference), Stallion Springs service board member, candidate for this district in 2024, and Democratic candidate for this district in 2022
- Jeremy Fox (No party preference), retired land surveyor

==== Endorsements ====
Vince Fong (R)

Executive branch officials

- Donald Trump, president of the United States (2017–2021, 2025–present)

Political parties

- California Republican Party
Declined to endorse

Labor unions

- California Federation of Labor Unions

Political parties

- California Democratic Party

==== Fundraising ====
Campaign finance reports as of May 13, 2026
Candidate	Raised	Spent	Cash on hand
Ben Dewell (I)	$2,860	$1,222	$2,342
Vince Fong (R)	$1,592,260	$1,317,278	$314,213
Jeremy Fox (I)	$300	$327	$107
Sandra Van Scotter (D)	$12,166	$9,765	$1,953
Source: Federal Election Commission

==== Results ====
Primary results
Party	Candidate	Votes	%
Republican	Vince Fong (incumbent)	115,035	68.16
Democratic	Sandra Van Scotter	48,611	28.80
No party preference	Ben Dewell	3,080	1.82
No party preference	Jeremy Fox	2,042	1.21
Total votes		168,768	100.0

=== General election ===
==== Predictions ====
Source	Ranking	As of
Decision Desk HQ	Safe R	July 14, 2026
The Cook Political Report	Solid R	November 5, 2025
Inside Elections	Solid R	March 7, 2025
Sabato's Crystal Ball	Safe R	July 15, 2025
The Economist	Safe R	May 6, 2026

==== Post-primary endorsements ====
Vince Fong (R)

Organizations

- U.S. Chamber of Commerce

==== Fundraising ====
Campaign finance reports as of May 13, 2026
Candidate	Raised	Spent	Cash on hand
Vince Fong (R)	$1,592,260	$1,317,278	$314,213
Sandra Van Scotter (D)	$12,166	$9,765	$1,953
Source: Federal Election Commission

==== Results ====
2026 California's 20th congressional district election
Party	Candidate	Votes	%	±%
Republican	Vince Fong (incumbent)			
Democratic	Sandra Van Scotter			
Total votes				

== District 21 ==
2026 California's 21st congressional district election
- Reporting: 61% as of Nov 10 at 5:11 AM PST
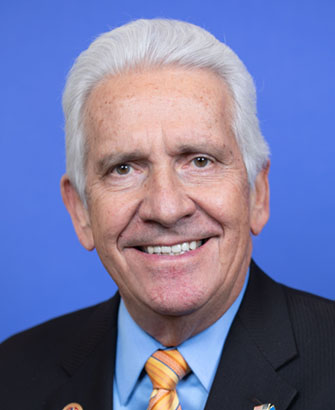

Candidate	Jim Costa	Kyle Kirkland
Party	Democratic	Republican
Popular vote	64,336	38,319
Percentage	62.7%	37.3%
U.S. representative before election
Jim Costa
Democratic
Elected U.S. representative
Jim Costa
Democratic

California's 21st congressional district boundary from the 2026 elections Interactive map version

The incumbent was Democrat Jim Costa who had represented the district since 2023 and was re-elected with 52.6% of the vote in 2024. Costa again won re-election.

=== Primary ===
==== Advanced to general ====
- Jim Costa (Democratic), incumbent U.S. representative
- Kyle Kirkland (Republican), casino owner and candidate for the 20th district in 2024

==== Eliminated in primary ====
- Eric Garcia (Democratic), therapist, candidate for this district in 2022, and independent candidate for the 22nd district in 2020
- Lourin Hubbard (Democratic), labor organizer and runner-up for the 22nd district in the 2022 special election
- Lance Kruse (No party preference), addictions counselor
- Lorenzo Rios (Republican), CEO of the Clovis Veterans Memorial District

=== Endorsements ===
Jim Costa (D)

U.S. senators

- Alex Padilla, California (2020–present)
- Adam Schiff, California (2025–present)

Statewide officials

- Rob Bonta, attorney general of California (2021–present)
- Eleni Kounalakis, lieutenant governor of California (2019–present)
- Gavin Newsom, governor of California (2019–present)

Labor unions

- California Federation of Labor Unions

Organizations

- Planned Parenthood Action Fund

Political parties

- California Democratic Party

==== Fundraising ====
Campaign finance reports as of May 13, 2026
Candidate	Raised	Spent	Cash on hand
Jim Costa (D)	$1,161,499	$552,239	$818,142
Eric Garcia (D)	$613	$594	$19
Kyle Kirkland (R)	$311,664	$258,682	$52,982
Lance Kruse (I)	$1,900	$1,740	$160
Lorenzo Rios (R)	$413,226	$341,298	$71,928
Source: Federal Election Commission

==== Results ====
Primary results
Party	Candidate	Votes	%
Democratic	Jim Costa (incumbent)	43,461	42.23
Republican	Kyle Kirkland	27,076	26.31
Republican	Lorenzo Rios	15,362	14.93
Democratic	Lourin Hubbard	10,577	10.28
Democratic	Eric Garcia	5,232	5.08
No party preference	Lance Kruse	1,213	1.18
Total votes		102,921	100.0

=== General election ===
==== Predictions ====
Source	Ranking	As of
Decision Desk HQ	Safe D	October 1, 2026
The Cook Political Report	Solid D	October 23, 2026
Inside Elections	Solid D	August 20, 2026
Sabato's Crystal Ball	Likely D	November 5, 2025
The Economist	Safe D	May 6, 2026

==== Post-primary endorsements ====
Jim Costa (D)

Organizations

- U.S. Chamber of Commerce

==== Fundraising ====
Campaign finance reports as of May 13, 2026
Candidate	Raised	Spent	Cash on hand
Jim Costa (D)	$1,161,499	$552,239	$818,142
Kyle Kirkland (R)	$723,332	$723,332	$0
Source: Federal Election Commission

==== Results ====
2026 California's 21st congressional district election
Party	Candidate	Votes	%	±%
Democratic	Jim Costa (incumbent)			
Republican	Kyle Kirkland			
Total votes				

== District 22 ==
2026 California's 22nd congressional district election
- Reporting: 94% as of Nov 13 at 7:58 PM PST
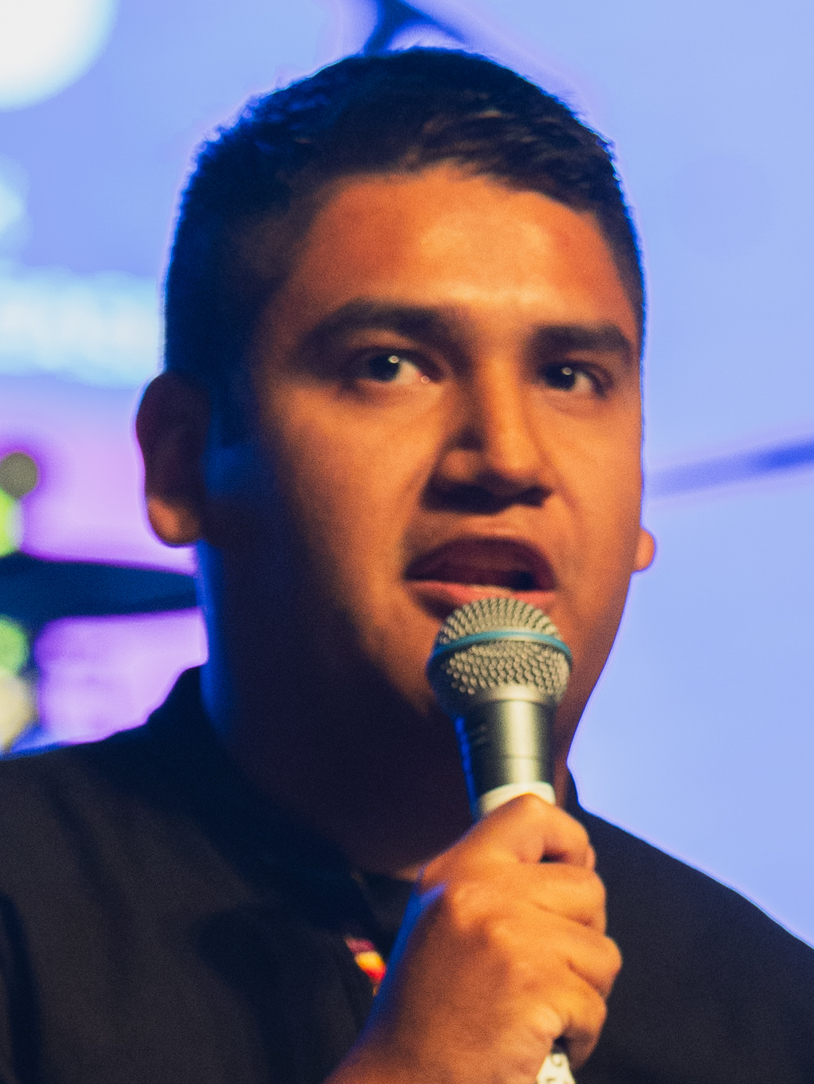

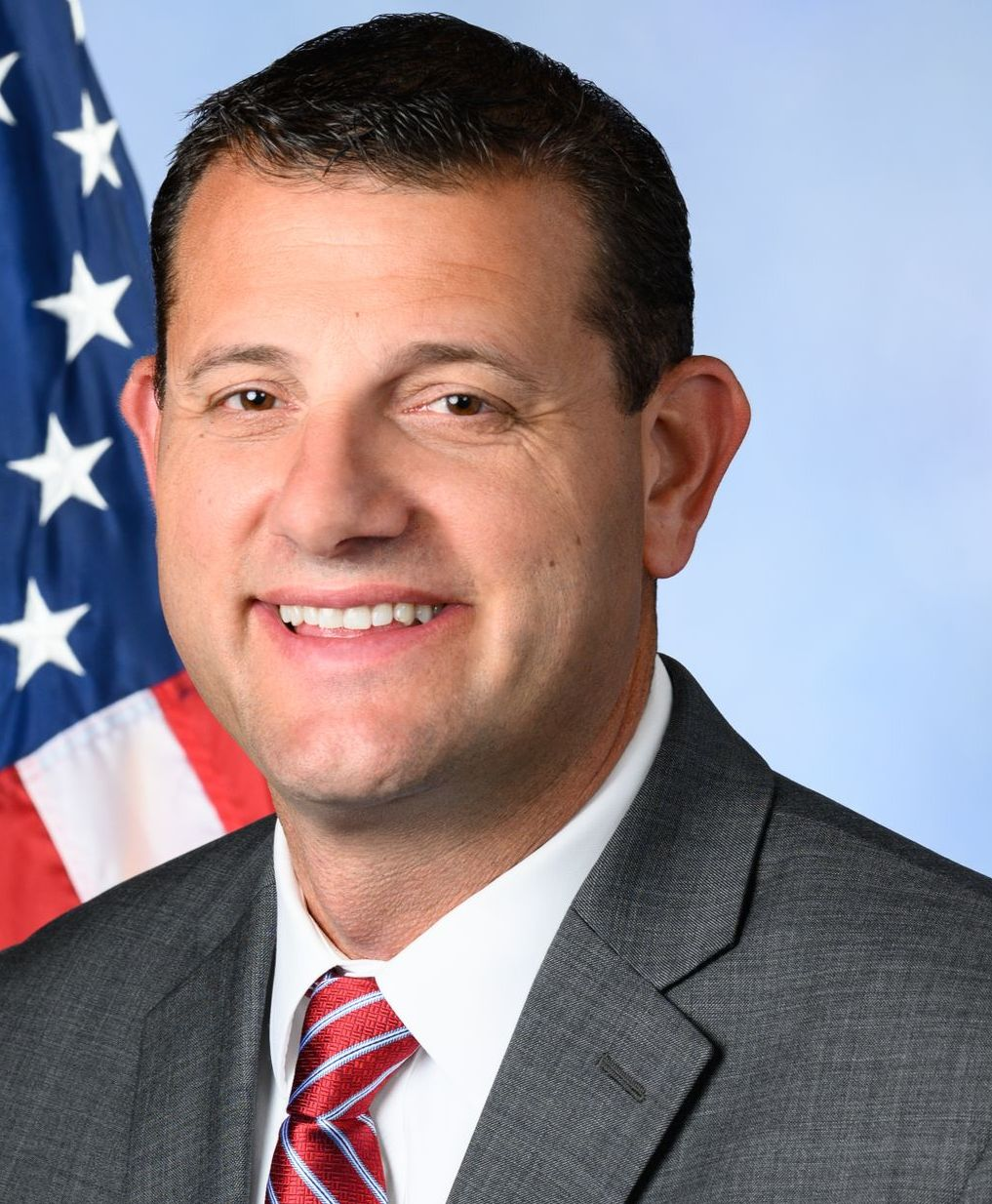
Candidate	Randy Villegas	David Valadao
Party	Democratic	Republican
Popular vote	99,696	47,355
Percentage	67.8%	32.2%
U.S. representative before election
David Valadao
Republican
Elected U.S. representative
Randy Villegas
Democratic

California's 22nd congressional district boundary from the 2026 elections Interactive map version

The incumbent was Republican David Valadao who had represented the district since 2023 and was re-elected with 53.4% of the vote in 2024. Following redistricting, Valadao was defeated by Democrat Randy Villegas.

=== Primary ===
==== Campaign ====
In the June 2026 top-two primary, the principal Democratic candidates were Villegas and Jasmeet Bains, a physician and member of the California State Assembly. Bains was endorsed by numerous state party officials and the Democratic Congressional Campaign Committee (DCCC), an unusual intervention by the national party in a contested primary. The DCCC's endorsement caused severe disagreement within the Democratic Party. Progressive Democrats criticized the DCCC's intervention and said "voters should pick nominees", including Pramila Jayapal, Greg Casar, and Maxwell Frost, while the DCCC argued that Bains was well positioned to defeat Valadao in the general election. The primary was often framed as a battle between the party's "establishment" and "progressive" wing. Outside groups spent more than $2.2 million on advertising against Villegas during the final month of the primary, including organizations associated with centrist Democrats, the Republican Party. The pro-Israel organization Democratic Majority for Israel alone spent over $500,000 against Villegas.

Villegas campaigned as a progressive and left-wing economic populist, with the Associated Press calling him a "populist insurgent". His campaign emphasized the cost of living, health care, labor rights, public education, immigration reform, and opposition to corporate influence in politics. Villegas was endorsed by Bernie Sanders, Alexandria Ocasio-Cortez, Dolores Huerta, Ro Khanna, the Congressional Progressive Caucus, and the California Working Families Party. Despite the DCCC's support for Bains, Villegas secured a key endorsement from the Congressional Hispanic Caucus.

In the June primary results, Valadao finished first with 40.7%, Villegas second with 32.4%, and Bains third with 26.9%. Valadao and Villegas advanced to the general election. Villegas' win against Bains was a major "anti-establishment" upset, which CalMatters described as a "stunning rebuke of establishment politics" After the primary, Democratic elected officials who had supported Bains endorsed Villegas for the general election. In June, some progressive members of Congress threatened to withhold their dues from the DCCC unless it changed course. In September, the DCCC endorsed Villegas. Villegas is a rare outspoken progressives in a competitive swing seat, and hopes to energize working-class voters with a progressive, economic populist agenda. In September, Bernie Sanders campaigned for Villegas.

==== Advanced to general ====
- David Valadao (Republican), incumbent U.S. representative
- Randy Villegas (Democratic), Visalia school board trustee

==== Eliminated in primary ====
- Jasmeet Bains (Democratic), state assemblymember from the 35th district (2022–present)

==== Endorsements ====
Jasmeet Bains (D)

Executive branch officials

- Eleni Kounalakis, lieutenant governor of California (2019–present) and former U.S. ambassador to Hungary (2011–2013)

U.S. representatives

- Ami Bera, CA-06 (2013–present)
- Julia Brownley, CA-26 (2013–present)
- Judy Chu, CA-28 (2009–present)
- Suzan DelBene, WA-01 (2012–present)
- Laura Friedman, CA-30 (2025–present)
- Adam Gray, CA-13 (2025–present)
- Zoe Lofgren, CA-18 (1995–present)
- Grace Meng, NY-06 (2013–present)
- Dave Min, CA-47 (2025–present)
- Luz Rivas, CA-29 (2025–present)
- Greg Stanton, AZ-04 (2019–present)
- Marilyn Strickland, WA-10 (2021–present)
- Mike Thompson, CA-04 (1999–present)
- Norma Torres, CA-35 (2015–present)

State legislators

- Melissa Hurtado, state senator from SD-16 (2018–present)
- Robert Rivas, speaker of the California State Assembly (2023–present) from the AD-29 (2018–present)

Labor unions

- California Faculty Association
- California Federation of Labor Unions
- IBEW Local 428
- National Union of Healthcare Workers
- SEIU California
- SEIU United Healthcare Workers West
- International Brotherhood of Teamsters Joint Council 7
- United Brotherhood of Carpenters and Joiners of America
- United Nurses Association of California

Organizations

- 314 Action Fund
- Asian American Action Fund
- ASPIRE PAC
- Blue Dog PAC
- Democratic Congressional Campaign Committee
- Democratic Majority for Israel
- Elect Democratic Women
- EMILYs List
- New Democrat Coalition Action Fund
- Planned Parenthood Action Fund
- WelcomePAC

Newspapers

- The Bakersfield Californian
David Valadao (R)

U.S. representatives

- Mike Johnson, speaker of the House (2023–present) from LA-04 (2017–present)

State legislators

- Carl DeMaio, state assemblymember from the 75th district (2024–present)

Organizations

- ClearPath Foundation
- Log Cabin Republicans
- Republican Jewish Coalition

Policial parties

- California Republican Party
Randy Villegas (D)

U.S. senators

- Bernie Sanders, Vermont (2007–present) (Independent)

U.S. representatives

- Nanette Barragan, CA-44 (2017–present)
- Tony Cardenas, former CA-29 (2013–2025)
- Greg Casar, TX-35 (2025–present)
- Chris Deluzio, PA-17 (2023–present)
- Lloyd Doggett, TX-37 (1995–present)
- Maxwell Frost, FL-10 (2023–present)
- Robert Garcia, CA-42 (2023–present)
- Adelita Grijalva, AZ-07 (2025–present)
- Pramila Jayapal, WA-07 (2017–present)
- Ro Khanna, CA-17 (2017–present)
- Rob Menendez, NJ-08 (2023–present)
- Alexandria Ocasio-Cortez, NY-14 (2019–present)
- Delia Ramirez, IL-03 (2023–present)
- Emily Randall, WA-06 (2025–present)
- Linda Sánchez, CA-38 (2003–present)
- Lateefah Simon, CA-12 (2025–present)

Party officials

- David Hogg, former vice chair of the Democratic National Committee (2025)

Individuals

- Dolores Huerta, labor leader (Deceased)

Labor unions

- California Teachers Association
- National Education Association
- National Nurses United
- United Auto Workers

Organizations

- American Priorities
- California Environmental Voters
- Center for Biological Diversity Action Fund
- Congressional Progressive Caucus PAC
- Courage California
- End Citizens United
- Friends of the Earth Action
- Latino Victory Fund
- Leaders We Deserve
- Congressional Hispanic Caucus BOLD PAC
- Our Revolution
- Peace Action
- People for the American Way
- Patriotic Millionaires
- Progressive Change Campaign Committee
- Progressive Democrats of America
- Showing Up for Racial Justice
- Track AIPAC

Political parties

- California Working Families Party

Newspapers

- McClatchy Media California (Note: The Sacramento Bee, The Modesto Bee, The Fresno Bee, Merced Sun-Star, and The Tribune)
Declined to endorse

Political parties

- California Democratic Party

==== Fundraising ====
Campaign finance reports as of May 13, 2026
Candidate	Raised	Spent	Cash on hand
Jasmeet Bains (D)	$1,302,740	$942,955	$359,785
David Valadao (R)	$4,233,413	$1,398,372	$2,880,577
Randy Villegas (D)	$1,748,192	$1,411,156	$337,037
Source: Federal Election Commission

=== Polling ===
==== Primary election ====
Poll source	Date(s) administered	Sample size	Margin of error	Jasmeet Bains (D)	David Valadao (R)	Randy Villegas (D)	Undecided
Data for Progress (D) (Note: Poll sponsored by the Working Families Party, which supports Villegas)	May 1–6, 2026	517 (LV)	± 4.0%	21%	44%	25%	10%

==== Results ====
Primary results
Party	Candidate	Votes	%
Republican	David Valadao (incumbent)	32,491	40.74
Democratic	Randy Villegas	25,808	32.36
Democratic	Jasmeet Bains	21,458	26.90
Total votes		79,757	100.0

=== General election ===
==== Predictions ====
Source	Ranking	As of
Decision Desk HQ	Likely D (flip)	September 25, 2026
Inside Elections	Tossup	October 1, 2026
The Cook Political Report	Tossup	November 5, 2025
Sabato's Crystal Ball	Lean D (flip)	July 16, 2026
The Economist	Lean D (flip)	May 6, 2026

==== Post-primary endorsements ====
Randy Villegas (D)

U.S. senators

- Alex Padilla, California (2021–present)
- Adam Schiff, California (2024–present)

U.S. representatives

- Pete Aguilar, CA-33 (2015–present)
- Zoe Lofgren, CA-18 (1995–present)
- Nancy Pelosi, former speaker of the House (2007–2011, 2019–2023) from CA-11 (1987–present)

Labor unions

- National Union of Healthcare Workers
- SEIU California

Organizations

- Democratic Congressional Campaign Committee
- Giffords
- Human Rights Campaign PAC
- Sierra Club

Political parties

- California Democratic Party

==== Fundraising ====
Campaign finance reports as of September 30, 2026
Candidate	Raised	Spent	Cash on hand
David Valadao (R)	$6,058,553	$3,705,596	$2,398,492
Randy Villegas (D)	$5,465,022	$4,758,222	$706,800
Source: Federal Election Commission

==== Polling ====
Poll source	Date(s) administered	Sample size	Margin of error	David Valadao (R)	Randy Villegas (D)	Other	Undecided
University of Southern California	October 22–28, 2026	356 (LV)	± 5.2%	41%	52%	1%	6%
University of Southern California	October 22–28, 2026	356 (LV)	± 5.2%	44%	54%	2%	–
Tulchin Research (D) (Note: Poll sponsored by House Majority PAC, which is focused on electing Democrats to the U.S. House of Representatives)	June 15–21, 2026	800 (LV)	—	44%	48%	–	8%

Hypothetical polling

David Valadao vs. generic Democrat

Poll source	Date(s) administered	Sample size	Margin of error	David Valadao (R)	Generic Democrat	Undecided
Public Policy Polling (D) (Note: Poll commissioned by ASPIRE PAC & the SEIU, both of whom have endorsed Bains)	August 6–8, 2025	547 (V)	± 4.2%	37%	43%	16%

David Valadao vs. Jasmeet Bains

Poll source	Date(s) administered	Sample size	Margin of error	David Valadao (R)	Jasmeet Bains (D)	Undecided
Public Policy Polling (D)	August 6–8, 2025	547 (V)	± 4.2%	42%	42%	17%

==== Results ====
2026 California's 22nd congressional district election
Party	Candidate	Votes	%	±%
Republican	David Valadao (incumbent)			
Democratic	Randy Villegas			
Total votes				

== District 23 ==
2026 California's 23rd congressional district election
- Reporting: 98% as of Nov 20 at 12:31 PM PST
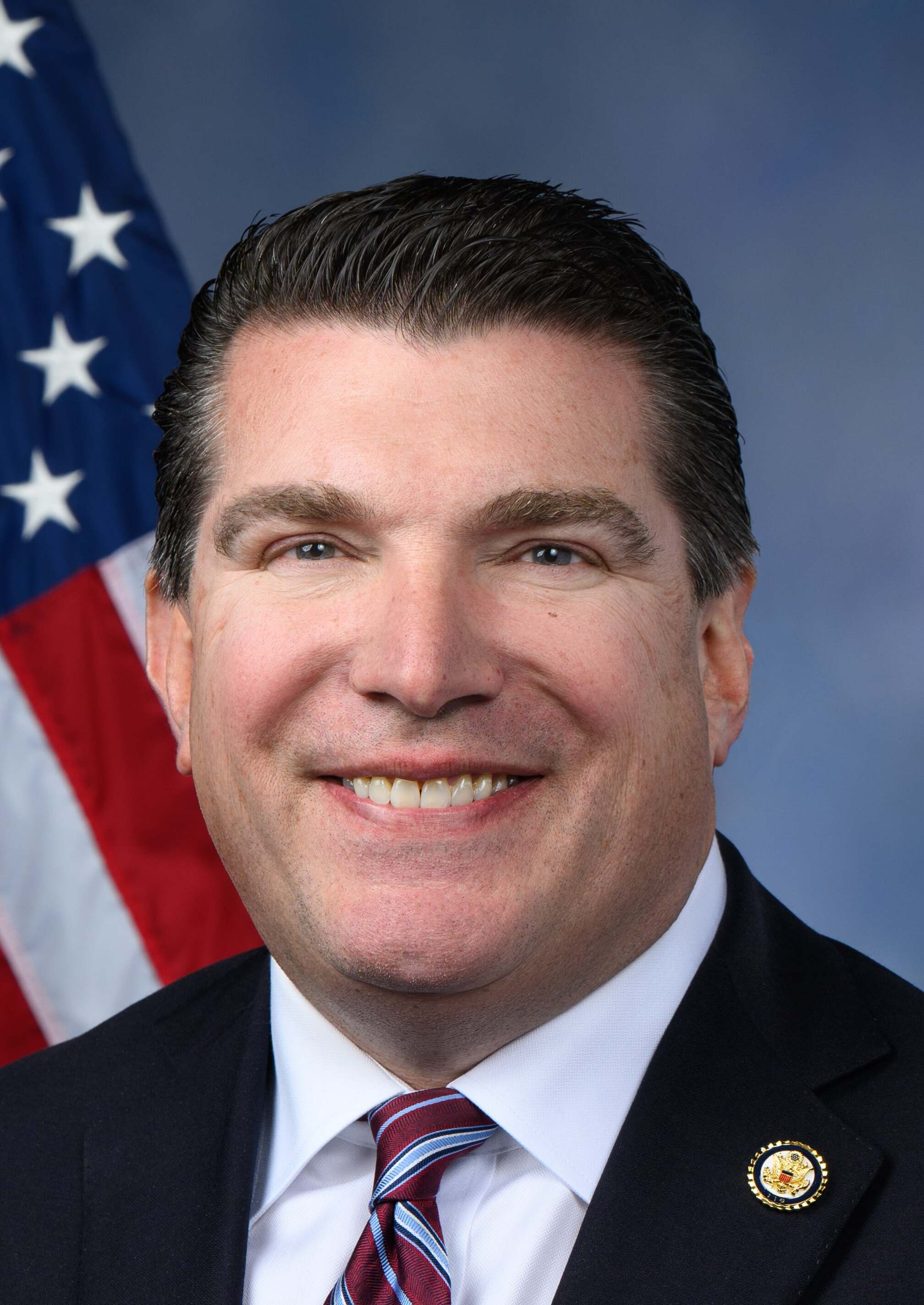

Candidate	Jay Obernolte	Tessa Lynn Hodge
Party	Republican	Democratic
Popular vote	109,548	106,000
Percentage	50.8%	49.2%
U.S. representative before election
Jay Obernolte
Republican
Elected U.S. representative
TBD

California's 23rd congressional district boundary from the 2026 elections Interactive map version

The incumbent was Republican Jay Obernolte who had represented the district since 2022 and was re-elected with 60.1% of the vote in 2024. Obernolte again won re-election.

=== Primary ===
==== Advanced to general ====
- Tessa Lynn Hodge (Democratic), clinical social worker
- Jay Obernolte (Republican), incumbent U.S. representative

==== Eliminated in primary ====
- Karen Leigh Matthews (No party preference), radiologist
- Karsten Scott Nicholson (Democratic)
- Eli C. Owens (No party preference)
- Charles Patrick Wallis (Democratic), software developer

==== Withdrawn ====
- Paul Chakalian (Democratic), distillery owner

==== Endorsements ====
Tessa Lynn Hodge (D)

Organizations

- Center for Biological Diversity Action Fund
- National Women's Political Caucus
- Progressive Victory
- Track AIPAC

Political parties

- California Democratic Party
Karen Leigh Matthews (I)

Political Parties

- Forward Party
Jay Obernolte (R)

Executive branch officials

- Donald Trump, president of the United States (2017–2021, 2025–present)

Political parties

- California Republican Party

Organizations

- Log Cabin Republicans

==== Fundraising ====
Campaign finance reports as of May 13, 2026
Candidate	Raised	Spent	Cash on hand
Tessa Hodge (D)	$65,986	$55,464	$10,522
Karen Matthews (NPP)	$158,227 (Note: 20,000 of this total was self-funded by Matthews.)	$133,614	$24,613
Jay Obernolte (R)	$1,199,459	$668,111	$1,529,188
Charles Wallace (D)	$58,444	$49,982	$8,462
Source: Federal Election Commission

==== Results ====
Primary results
Party	Candidate	Votes	%
Republican	Jay Obernolte (incumbent)	81,346	57.08
Democratic	Tessa Lynn Hodge	30,292	21.25
Democratic	Pat Wallis	18,945	13.29
No party preference	Karen Leigh Matthews	6,501	4.56
Democratic	Karsten Scott Nicholson	4,409	3.09
No party preference	Eli C. Owens	986	0.69
Democratic	Renee Longshore (write-in)	36	0.03
Republican	Robert Matthew Riter (write-in)	9	0.01
Total votes		142,524	100.0

=== General election ===
==== Predictions ====
Source	Ranking	As of
Decision Desk HQ	Safe R	July 14, 2026
The Cook Political Report	Solid R	November 5, 2025
Inside Elections	Solid R	March 7, 2025
Sabato's Crystal Ball	Safe R	July 15, 2025
The Economist	Safe R	May 6, 2026

==== Post-primary endorsements ====
Jay Obernolte (R)

Organizations

- U.S. Chamber of Commerce

==== Fundraising ====
Campaign finance reports as of May 13, 2026
Candidate	Raised	Spent	Cash on hand
Jay Obernolte (R)	$1,199,459	$668,111	$1,529,188
Tessa Lynn Hodge (D)	$65,986	$55,464	$10,522
Source: Federal Election Commission

==== Results ====
2026 California's 23rd congressional district election
Party	Candidate	Votes	%	±%
Republican	Jay Obernolte (incumbent)			
Democratic	Tessa Lynn Hodge			
Total votes				

== District 24 ==
2026 California's 24th congressional district election
- Reporting: 62% as of Nov 10 at 10:12 AM PST
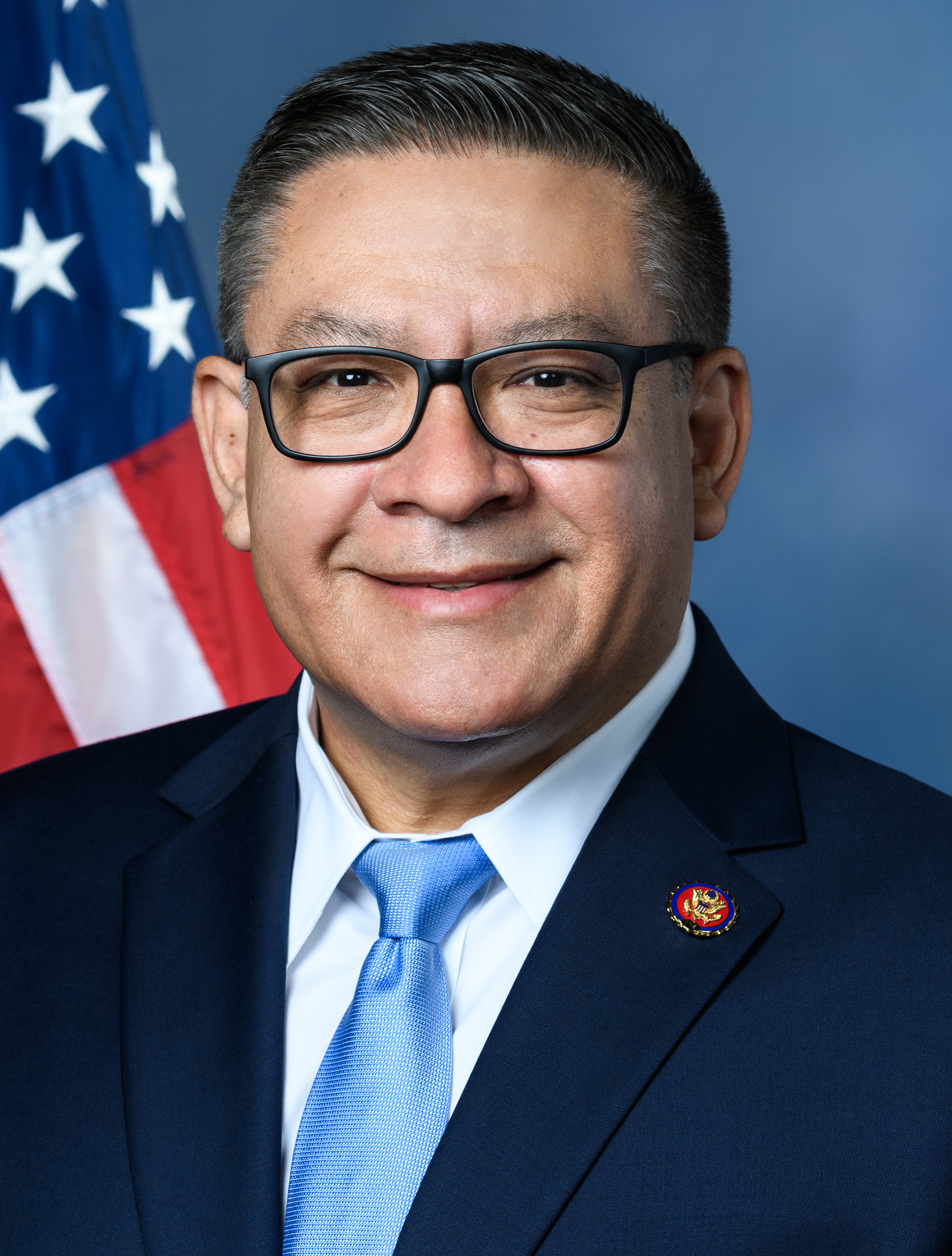

Candidate	Salud Carbajal	Bob Smith
Party	Democratic	Republican
Popular vote	126,843	65,258
Percentage	66.0%	34.0%
U.S. representative before election
Salud Carbajal
Democratic
Elected U.S. representative
Salud Carbajal
Democratic

California's 24th congressional district boundary from the 2026 elections Interactive map version

The incumbent was Democrat Salud Carbajal who had represented the district since 2017 and was re-elected with 62.7% of the vote in 2024. Carbajal again won re-election.

=== Primary ===
==== Advanced to general ====
- Salud Carbajal (Democratic), incumbent U.S. representative
- Bob Smith (Republican), engineer

==== Eliminated in primary ====
- Sarah Bacon (Democratic), graduate student
- Helena Pasquarella (Peace and Freedom), teacher

==== Endorsements ====
Salud Carbajal (D)

Labor unions

- California Federation of Labor Unions
- National Union of Healthcare Workers

Organizations

- Brady Campaign
- California Environmental Voters
- Center for Biological Diversity Action Fund
- J Street
- Planned Parenthood Action Fund
- Sierra Club

Political parties

- California Democratic Party
Bob Smith (R)

Political parties

- California Republican Party

==== Fundraising ====
Campaign finance reports as of May 13, 2026
Candidate	Raised	Spent	Cash on hand
Sarah Bacon (D)	$25,061	$21,008	$4,053
Salud Carbajal (D)	$1,471,885	$809,951	$3,305,804
Robert Smith (R)	$182,372	$132,075	$50,297
Source: Federal Election Commission

==== Results ====
Primary results
Party	Candidate	Votes	%
Democratic	Salud Carbajal (incumbent)	113,716	54.36
Republican	Bob Smith	75,085	35.89
Democratic	Sarah Bacon	15,636	7.47
Peace and Freedom	Helena Pasquarella	4,759	2.27
Total votes		209,196	100.0

=== Post-primary endorsements ===
Salud Carbajal (D)

Newspapers

- Santa Barbara Independent

==== Predictions ====
Source	Ranking	As of
Decision Desk HQ	Safe D	July 14, 2026
The Cook Political Report	Solid D	November 5, 2025
Inside Elections	Solid D	March 7, 2025
Sabato's Crystal Ball	Safe D	July 15, 2025
The Economist	Safe D	May 6, 2026

==== Fundraising ====
Campaign finance reports as of May 13, 2026
Candidate	Raised	Spent	Cash on hand
Salud Carbajal (D)	$1,471,885	$809,951	$3,305,804
Bob Smith (R)	$182,372	$132,075	$50,297
Source: Federal Election Commission

==== Results ====
2026 California's 24th congressional district election
Party	Candidate	Votes	%	±%
Democratic	Salud Carbajal (incumbent)			
Republican	Bob Smith			
Total votes				

== District 25 ==
2026 California's 25th congressional district election
- Reporting: 64% as of Nov 10 at 10:12 AM PST
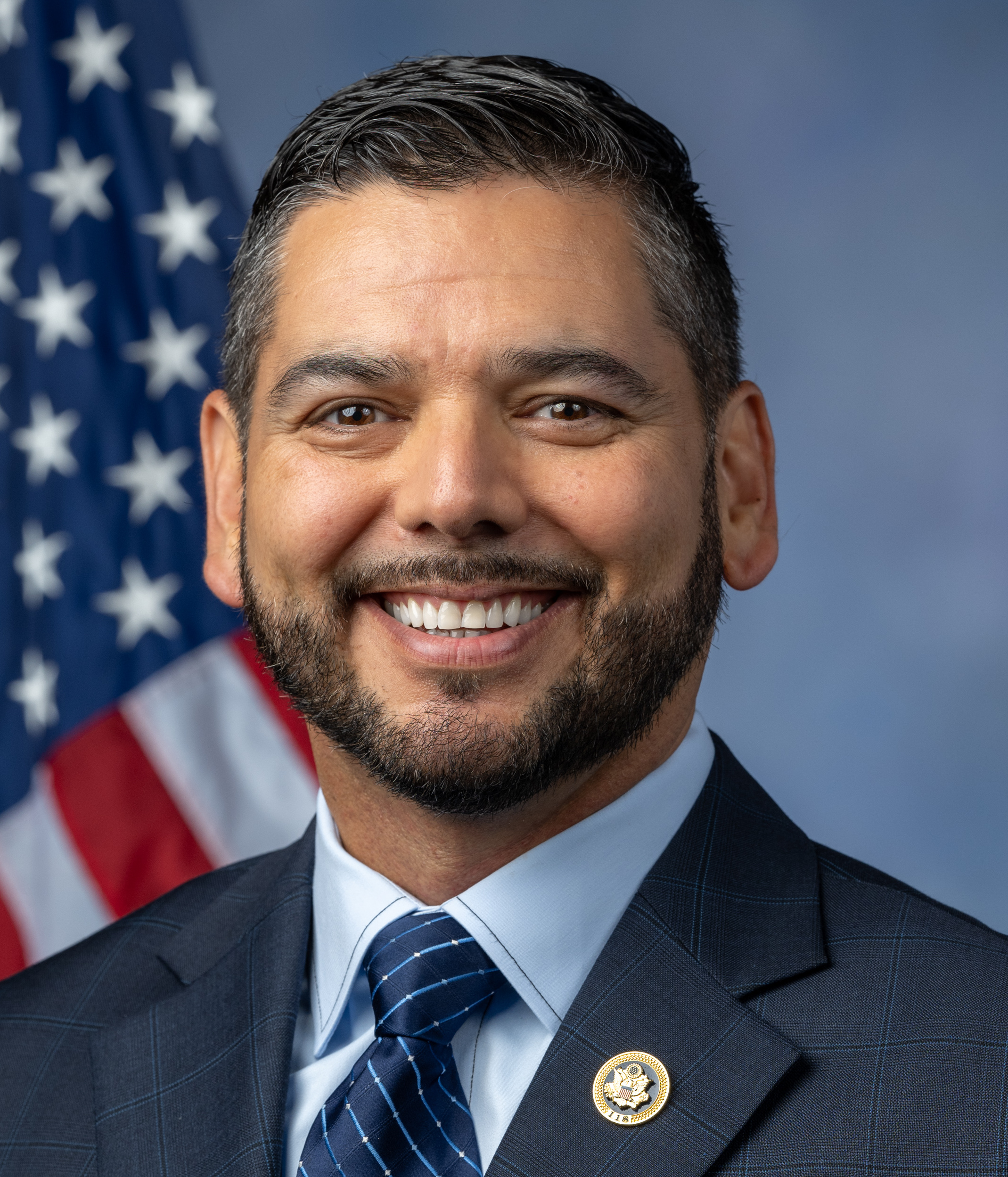

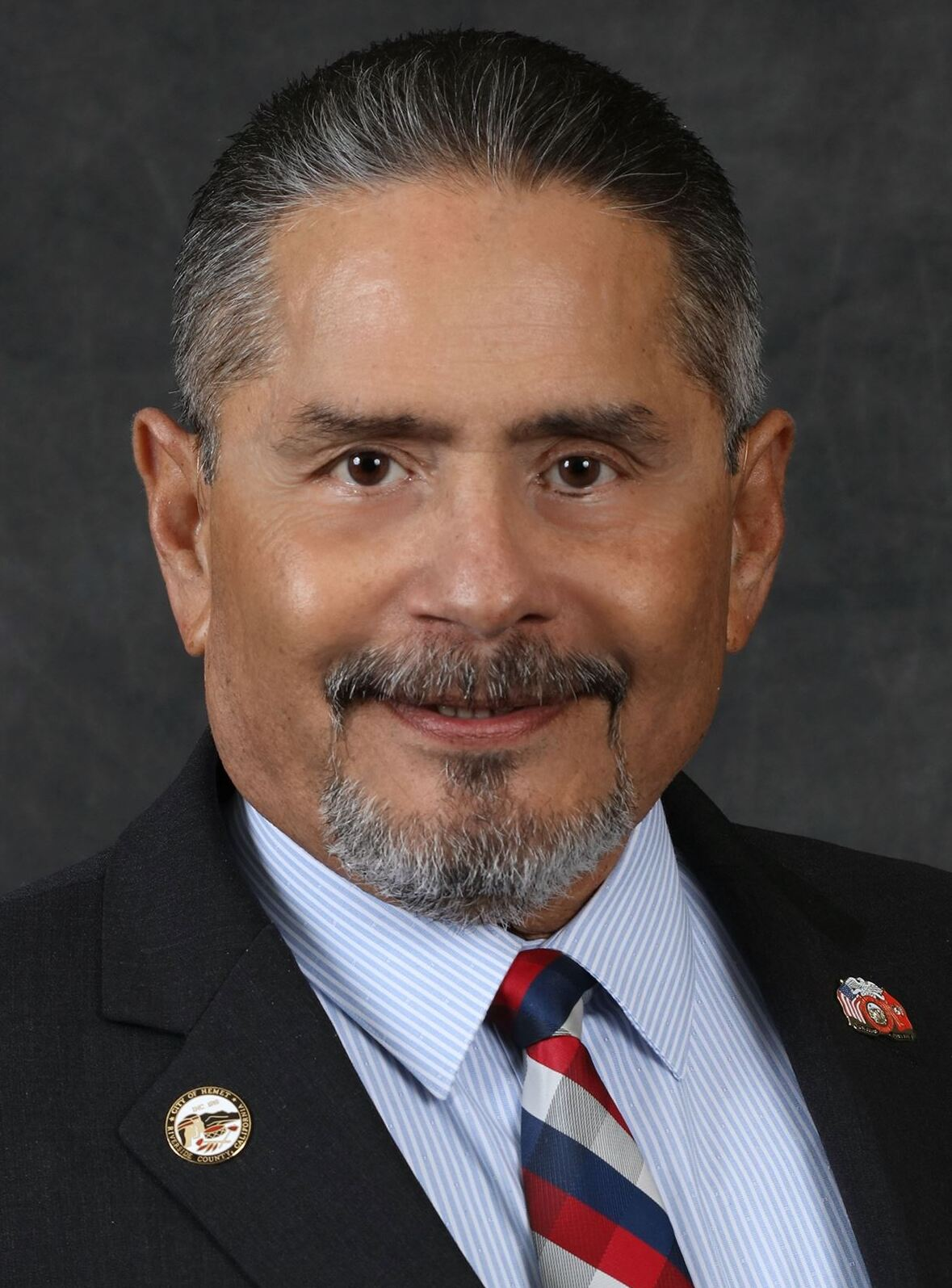
Candidate	Raul Ruiz	Joe Males
Party	Democratic	Republican
Popular vote	102,734	55,146
Percentage	65.1%	34.9%
U.S. representative before election
Raul Ruiz
Democratic
Elected U.S. representative
Raul Ruiz
Democratic

California's 25th congressional district boundary from the 2026 elections Interactive map version

The incumbent was Democrat Raul Ruiz who had represented the district since 2023 and was re-elected with 56.3% of the vote in 2024. Ruiz again won re-election.

=== Primary ===
==== Advanced to general ====
- Joe Males (Republican), Hemet city councilor
- Raul Ruiz (Democratic), incumbent U.S. representative

==== Eliminated in primary ====
- Ron Huffman (Republican), retired electrical worker
- Ceci Truman (Republican), businesswoman and candidate for this district in 2022 and 2024

==== Endorsements ====
Raul Ruiz (D)

Labor unions

- California Federation of Labor Unions
- National Union of Healthcare Workers

Organizations

- 314 Action
- California Environmental Voters
- AIPAC
- Democratic Majority for Israel
- Joint Action Committee for Political Affairs
- J Street
- Planned Parenthood Action Fund

Political parties

- California Democratic Party
Joe Males (R)

State legislators

- Jeff Gonzalez
- Greg Wallis

Political parties

- California Republican Party

==== Fundraising ====
Campaign finance reports as of May 13, 2026
Candidate	Raised	Spent	Cash on hand
Joe Males (R)	$885,538	$873,968	$11,570
Raul Ruiz (D)	$1,868,739	$1,137,267	$2,434,212
Ceci Truman (R)	$305,442	$295,692	$12,357
Source: Federal Election Commission

==== Results ====
Primary results
Party	Candidate	Votes	%
Democratic	Raul Ruiz (incumbent)	88,699	60.01
Republican	Joe Males	27,927	18.89
Republican	Ronald Huffman	18,221	12.33
Republican	Ceci Andrade Truman	12,959	8.77
Total votes		147,806	100.0

=== General election ===
==== Predictions ====
Source	Ranking	As of
Decision Desk HQ	Safe D	September 25, 2026
The Cook Political Report	Solid D	January 15, 2026
Inside Elections	Solid D	March 12, 2026
Sabato's Crystal Ball	Safe D	February 5, 2026
The Economist	Safe D	May 6, 2026

==== Fundraising ====
Campaign finance reports as of May 13, 2026
Candidate	Raised	Spent	Cash on hand
Raul Ruiz (D)	$1,868,739	$1,137,267	$2,424,212
Joe Males (R)	$885,538	$873,968	$11,570
Source: Federal Election Commission

==== Results ====
2026 California's 25th congressional district election
Party	Candidate	Votes	%	±%
Democratic	Raul Ruiz (incumbent)			
Republican	Joe Males			
Total votes				

== District 26 ==
2026 California's 26th congressional district election
- Reporting: 77% as of Nov 10 at 10:12 AM PST

Candidate	Jacqui Irwin	Sam Gallucci
Party	Democratic	Republican
Popular vote	137,313	83,793
Percentage	62.1%	37.9%
U.S. representative before election
Julia Brownley
Democratic
Elected U.S. representative
Jacqui Irwin
Democratic

California's 26th congressional district boundary from the 2026 elections Interactive map version

The incumbent was Democrat Julia Brownley who had represented the district since 2013 and who was re-elected with 56.1% of the vote in 2024. In January 2026, Brownley announced that she would not seek re-election. Democrat Jacqui Irwin defeated Republican Sam Gallucci in the general election for the vacant seat.

=== Primary ===
==== Advanced to general ====
- Sam Gallucci (Republican), pastor
- Jacqui Irwin (Democratic), state assemblymember from the 42nd district (2014–present)

==== Eliminated in primary ====
- Chris Espinosa (Democratic), former staffer for then–U.S. representative Raúl Grijalva
- Liam Hernandez (Democratic), businessman
- Sonia Kacker (Democratic), physician
- Michael Koslow (Republican), healthcare investigator and runner-up for this district in 2024
- Daniel Miller (Republican), businessman
- Sasan Samadzadeh (Democratic), construction inspector
- William Scott (Republican), systems engineer

==== Declined ====
- Julia Brownley (Democratic), incumbent U.S. representative (endorsed Irwin)
- Monique Limón (Democratic), President pro tempore of the California State Senate (2025–present) from the 21st district (2020–present)
- Trisha Paytas (Independent), influencer and actress

==== Endorsements ====
Jacqui Irwin (D)

U.S. senators

- Alex Padilla, California (2021–present)
- Adam Schiff, California (2024–present)

U.S. representatives

- Julia Brownley, CA-26 (2013–present)
- Salud Carbajal, CA-24 (2017–present)
- Lou Correa, CA-46 (2017–present)
- Laura Friedman, CA-30 (2025–present)
- Robert Garcia, CA-42 (2023–present)
- Adam Gray, CA-13 (2025–present)
- Jared Huffman, CA-02 (2013–present)
- Sydney Kamlager-Dove, CA-37 (2023–present)
- Ted Lieu, CA-36 (2015–present)
- Dave Min, CA-47 (2025–present)
- Kevin Mullin, CA-15 (2023–present)
- Luz Rivas, CA-29 (2025–present)
- Greg Stanton, AZ-04 (2019–present)
- Mark Takano, CA-39 (2013–present)
- Mike Thompson, CA-04 (1999–present)
- George Whitesides, CA-27 (2025–present)

Statewide officials

- Eleni Kounalakis, lieutenant governor of California (2019–present)
- Gavin Newsom, governor of California (2019–present)

State legislators

- Cecilia Aguiar-Curry, majority leader of the California State Assembly (2023–present) from AD-04 (2016–present)
- Kevin McCarty, mayor of Sacramento (2024–present) and former state assemblymember from AD-06 (2014–2024)
- Robert Rivas, speaker of the California State Assembly (2023–present) from AD-29 (2018–present)
- Henry Stern, state senator from SD-27 (2016–present)

Labor unions

- California Faculty Association
- California Federation of Labor Unions
- National Union of Healthcare Workers
- SEIU California
- SEIU United Healthcare Workers West

Organizations

- 314 Action Fund
- California Environmental Voters
- Elect Democratic Women
- National Women's Political Caucus

Political parties

- California Democratic Party
Chris Espinosa (D)

U.S. representatives

- Adelita Grijalva, AZ-07 (2025–present)

Organizations

- Center for Biological Diversity Action Fund
- Climate Hawks Vote
- Food & Water Action
- Friends of the Earth Action
- Indivisible Ventura
- Progressive Democrats of America
Julia Brownley (D) (declined to run)

Organizations

- Stonewall Democratic Club

==== Fundraising ====
Campaign finance reports as of May 13, 2026
Candidate	Raised	Spent	Cash on hand
Chris Espinosa (D)	$104,141	$85,852	$18,289
Samuel Gallucci (R)	$320,553	$297,294	$23,260
Jacqui Irwin (D)	$707,694	$287,886	$419,809
Sonia Kacker (D)	$66,775	$43,916	$22,859
Michael Koslow (R)	$87,119	$80,652	$17,778
William Scott (R)	$24,850	$3,240	$9,103
Source: Federal Election Commission

==== Results ====
Primary results
Party	Candidate	Votes	%
Democratic	Jacqui Irwin	79,790	41.29
Republican	Sam Gallucci	40,334	20.87
Democratic	Chris Espinosa	19,902	10.30
Republican	Michael S. Koslow	18,454	9.55
Republican	William "Bill" Scott	16,204	8.39
Democratic	Sonia Kacker	8,940	4.63
Democratic	Liam Andres O'Neill Hernandez	3,305	1.71
Republican	Daniel Miller	3,179	1.65
Democratic	Susan Samadzadeh	3,122	1.62
Total votes		193,230	100.0

=== General election ===
==== Predictions ====
Source	Ranking	As of
Decision Desk HQ	Safe D	July 14, 2026
The Cook Political Report	Solid D	November 5, 2025
Inside Elections	Solid D	March 7, 2025
Sabato's Crystal Ball	Safe D	July 15, 2025
The Economist	Safe D	May 6, 2026

==== Post-primary endorsements ====
Jacqui Irwin (D)

Organizations

- Giffords

==== Fundraising ====
Campaign finance reports as of May 13, 2026
Candidate	Raised	Spent	Cash on hand
Jacqui Irwin (D)	$707,694	$287,886	$419,809
Sam Gallucci (R)	$320,553	$297,294	$23,260
Source: Federal Election Commission

==== Results ====
2026 California's 26th congressional district election
Party	Candidate	Votes	%	±%
Democratic	Jacqui Irwin			
Republican	Sam Gallucci			
Total votes				

== Notes ==
Partisan and media clients
