= 2020 United States elections =

- ← 2018 2019 2020 2021 2022 → Presidential election year
- Election day: November 3
- Incumbent president: ▌Donald Trump (R)
- Next Congress: 117th

Presidential election
- Partisan control: Democratic gain
- Popular vote margin: Democratic +4.5%
- Electoral vote
- Joe Biden (D): 306
- Donald Trump (R): 232
- Presidential election results map. Blue denotes states won by Biden/Harris, and red denotes states won by Trump/Pence. Numbers indicate electoral votes allotted to the winner of each state or district.

Senate elections
- Overall control: Democratic gain (Note: The 2020 Senate elections left both parties with 50 Senate seats, leaving the Vice President of the United States to break ties. Republicans briefly retained control of the chamber until January 20, 2021, when Vice President Kamala Harris and senators Alex Padilla, Jon Ossoff, and Raphael Warnock were sworn in.)
- Seats contested: 35 of 100 seats (33 seats of Class II + 2 special elections)
- Net seat change: Democratic +3
- Map of the 2020 Senate races (Georgia held two Senate elections) Democratic hold Republican hold Democratic gain Republican gain No election

House elections
- Overall control: Democratic hold
- Seats contested: All 435 voting-members All six non-voting delegates
- Popular vote margin: Democratic +3.1%
- Net seat change: Republican +13
- Map of the 2020 House of Representatives elections Democratic hold Republican hold Democratic gain Republican gain

Gubernatorial elections
- Seats contested: 13 (11 states, two territories)
- Net seat change: Republican +1
- Map of the 2020 gubernatorial races Democratic hold Republican hold Republican gain New Progressive hold Nonpartisan; No election

Elections were held in the United States on November 3, 2020. The Democratic Party's nominee, former vice president Joe Biden, defeated incumbent Republican president Donald Trump in the presidential election. Despite losing seats in the House of Representatives, Democrats retained control of the House and very narrowly gained control of the Senate. As a result, the Democrats obtained a government trifecta, the first time since the elections in 2008 that the party gained unified control of Congress and the presidency. With Trump losing his bid for re-election, he became the first president to have seen his party lose the presidency and control of both the House and the Senate in a single term since Herbert Hoover in 1932. This was the first time since 1980 that either chamber of Congress flipped partisan control in a presidential year, and the first time Democrats did so since 1948.

Biden became his party's nominee after defeating numerous challengers in the Democratic primaries, while Trump faced token opposition in the Republican primaries. In the congressional elections, Democrats lost seats in the House of Representatives but retained their majority in the chamber by a narrow margin. Democrats made a net gain of three seats in the Senate for a total of 50 seats, taking control of the chamber as newly elected vice-president Kamala Harris could cast tie-breaking votes. Contests for the six non-voting congressional delegates from the District of Columbia and the permanently inhabited U.S. territories were also held during the 2020 elections.

Regularly scheduled elections were held in 86 of the 99 state legislative chambers, and 11 states held their gubernatorial elections. Only one state governorship and two legislative chambers changed partisan control, as Republicans won the gubernatorial race in Montana and gained control of both legislative chambers in New Hampshire. Various other state executive and judicial elections, as well as numerous referendums, tribal elections, mayoral elections, and other local elections, also took place in 2020. The 2020 elections were the last major set of elections to impact the redistricting cycle that will take place following the 2020 census. Significant issues for voters included the ongoing COVID-19 pandemic, as well as health care, the economy, racial unrest and climate change. Social distancing guidelines resulted in unprecedented levels of postal voting and early voting. Voter turnout greatly exceeded recent elections; one projection has turnout by voting eligible population being higher than any election since 1900.

After Biden won the election, Trump and other Republicans refused to concede, making baseless and disproven claims of widespread voter fraud, despite U.S. election security officials saying that the election was "the most secure in American history". These attempts to overturn the election resulted in a deadly attack on the U.S. Capitol, which led to Trump being impeached for the second time and deplatformed across several major social media platforms.

== Issues ==
During the campaign, the most prominent issues were the ongoing COVID-19 pandemic, health care, economy, race, and abortion. Democrats emphasized COVID-19 economic relief and public health measures such as contact tracing, face mask usage, and social distancing, whereas Republicans downplayed COVID-19, scuttled coronavirus economic relief negotiations in the lead-up to the election, and advocated for laxer public health measures to deal with the spread of COVID-19. Trump himself held events across the country, including in COVID-19 hotspots, where attendees did not wear masks and were not socially distancing; at the same time, he mocked those who wore face masks.

The Republican Party opted not to provide a comprehensive platform of its policy positions for the election; the 2020 platform was a one-page resolution which stated that the party "has and will continue to enthusiastically support the president's America-first agenda." Democrats ran on protecting and expanding the Affordable Care Act, while criticizing Republicans for jeopardizing protections for individuals with preexisting conditions. Republicans generally did not emphasize health care issues, as their opposition to the Affordable Care Act had become a political liability by 2020, as the legislation had grown in popularity.

On the environment, Democrats proposed plans to combat climate change, including through investments in renewable energy and rejoining the Paris Climate Accords, whereas Republicans emphasized increased production of oil and natural gas.

During the election campaign, Democrats made calls for criminal justice reform and spoke of a need to reduce systemic racism in the criminal justice system. Republicans ran on a "law and order" and pro-police messaging. While Democrats in many races were moderate, Republicans depicted them as extremists or secret "socialists" who held radical views on criminal justice or climate legislation.

The rhetoric of incumbent president Donald Trump and his allies during the election campaign was marked by frequent use of falsehoods and promotion of unfounded conspiracy theories. In the lead-up to the elections, Republicans attacked voting rights and spread falsehoods about voter fraud. Trump refused to commit to a peaceful transition of power in case he lost the election. While senior Republicans disapproved of Trump's rhetoric in private, they refused to rebuke him publicly.

== Federal elections ==
=== Presidential election ===
The U.S. presidential election of 2020 was the 59th quadrennial U.S. presidential election, and was held to fill a term lasting from January 20, 2021, to January 20, 2025. By November 7, all major media organizations had projected that former vice president Joe Biden, the candidate of the Democratic Party, had defeated incumbent Republican president Donald Trump in the election. Based on the winner of the popular vote in each state, (Note: 48 states allocate all of their electoral votes to the winner of the statewide vote, while two states, Maine and Nebraska, allocate two electoral votes to the winner of the statewide vote and allocate the remaining votes to the winner of each congressional district.) the Electoral College cast votes on December 14, and Congress counted the electoral votes and formally declared Biden as the election winner in a joint session on January 6, 2021. In the months after the election, Trump challenged the results of the election, but on January 7, following congressional certification of the electoral vote and the 2021 storming of the United States Capitol, Trump acknowledged that "a new administration will be inaugurated."

Biden won the election with 306 electoral votes and 51.3% of the national popular vote, compared to Trump's 232 electoral votes and 46.8% of the popular vote. Biden won every state that 2016 Democratic presidential nominee Hillary Clinton won in the 2016 presidential election, as well as Arizona, Georgia, Michigan, Pennsylvania, Wisconsin, and Nebraska's second congressional district. Biden won the tipping-point state, Wisconsin, by a margin of 0.6%. While Biden won the popular vote by 7 million votes, across Arizona, Georgia, and Wisconsin, the three states whose electoral votes contributed to Biden's win, Biden won by fewer than 45,000 votes. In California and New York, Biden received 7 million more votes than Trump, accounting for Biden's popular vote win. Among third party and independent candidates, Libertarian Party candidate Jo Jorgensen won 1.2% of the popular vote, Green Party candidate Howie Hawkins finished with 0.3% of the vote, and various other candidates won about 0.4% of the vote.

Incumbent Trump won re-nomination by his party after facing token opposition in the 2020 Republican primaries. The Republican Party also re-nominated Vice President Mike Pence as Trump's running mate for the 2020 election. Biden became the Democratic Party's presumptive nominee in early April 2020 after Bernie Sanders withdrew from the 2020 Democratic Party presidential primaries; Biden later chose Kamala Harris as his running mate shortly before the 2020 Democratic National Convention. Along with Biden and Sanders, Elizabeth Warren, Michael Bloomberg, Pete Buttigieg, Amy Klobuchar, and Tulsi Gabbard all won at least one delegate in the 2020 Democratic presidential primaries. Beyond the two major parties, about 1,200 individuals listed their names with the federal government as third party and independent candidates. (Note: Under federal law, individuals do not become official candidates for president until they raise and report at least $5000 for their campaign, and not all of the individuals who listed themselves as candidates reached this threshold.)

Biden is the oldest individual to win a US presidential election, and Kamala Harris is the first woman to be elected vice president of the US. Trump's defeat made him the first incumbent president to lose re-election since George H. W. Bush in the 1992 presidential election, and the tenth elected president to lose his re-election bid. He also became the first elected president to lose the popular vote twice since Benjamin Harrison in the late 19th century; and the first president ever to be elected while losing the popular vote, to then be impeached, and to then lose reelection as an incumbent. Accounting for the Democratic gain of the House in 2018, 2020 represented the first time since the 1930 and 1932 elections, as well as the sixth time overall, that an opposition party flipped control of the White House and both houses of Congress from the prior governing party following a single presidential term. Biden became the first U.S. presidential candidate to win over 80 million total votes, won the highest share of the popular vote of any challenger to an incumbent president since the 1932 presidential election, and won the popular vote by the largest margin since Barack Obama's victory in the 2008 presidential election. The Democratic victory in the national popular vote marked the seventh time in eight elections that Democrats won the national popular vote, although Republicans won the majority of the electoral vote (and thus the election) in three of those eight elections.

=== Congressional elections ===
==== Senate elections ====
↓
33	12	2	23	30

15 Democrats not up	12 Democrats up	(Note: 2 Independents not up)	23 Republicans up	30 Republicans not up

Control of Senate seats by class after the 2020 elections
Class	Democratic	Independent	Republican	Next elections
1	21	2	10	2024
2	13	0	20	2026
3	14	0	20	2022
Total	48	2	50	—N/a

Thirty-five of the 100 seats in the United States Senate were up for election in 2020: all 33 seats of Senate Class II, and seats in Arizona and Georgia that were up for special elections. Republicans defended 23 seats, while Democrats defended 12 seats. Prior to the 2020 election, and including seats not up for election, Republicans held 53 Senate seats, while Democrats held 45 seats, and Democratic-aligned independents held the remaining two seats. Because the vice president has the casting vote in the Senate, Democrats needed to achieve a net gain of at least three seats to achieve control if they won the vice presidency; otherwise, they needed to achieve a net gain of at least four seats to take the majority.

Five seats changed partisan control in the 2020 elections, as Democrats defeated both Republican incumbents in Georgia, as well as the Republican incumbents in the seats up in Arizona and Colorado. Republicans picked up one seat by defeating the Democratic incumbent in Alabama. The results of the 2020 cycle left both partisan caucuses with 50 senators. Democrats gained majority control of the Senate on January 20, 2021, when Vice President-elect Harris and senators Alex Padilla, Jon Ossoff, and Raphael Warnock were sworn into office. Democrats gained control of the Senate for the first time since they lost control in the 2014 United States Senate elections.

==== House of Representatives elections ====
Cartogram of U.S. House of Representative results: Democratic gain Republican gain Democratic hold Republican hold Independent hold New Progressive (Puerto Rico) & Republican hold

All 435 voting seats in the United States House of Representatives were up for election; 218 seats are necessary for a majority. The winners of each race serve a two-year term. Democrats had gained control of the House of Representatives in the 2018 elections, winning 235 seats compared to 199 seats for Republicans. (Note: The results of one 2018 race, the 2018 North Carolina's 9th congressional district election, were declared void due to voting irregularities.) Due to vacancies and party-switching that arose during the 116th Congress, immediately before the November 2020 elections Democrats held 232 seats, compared to 197 seats held by Republicans and one seat, that of Justin Amash, held by the Libertarian Party. Thus, Republicans needed to gain 21 seats to gain a majority.

Republicans picked up 14 seats in the House elections, defeating thirteen incumbent House Democrats. Nationally, Democratic House candidates won by a margin of about 3%, as many Democrats ran behind Biden. The election results left Democrats with a narrow majority of 222 seats at the start of the 117th Congress.

===== Special elections =====
Five special elections were held in 2020 to replace a member who resigned or died in office during the 116th U.S. Congress:

- California's 25th congressional district: Republican Mike Garcia defeated Democrat Christy Smith to replace Democrat Katie Hill who, on October 27, 2019, announced her intent to resign in the wake of ethics concerns surrounding a relationship with a staffer. The district has an even partisan index.
- Georgia's 5th congressional district: Democrat Kwanza Hall defeated Democrat Robert Michael Franklin Jr. to succeed Democrat John Lewis after his death from pancreatic cancer on July 17, 2020. The district has a partisan index of D+34.
- Maryland's 7th congressional district: Democrat Kweisi Mfume defeated Republican Kimberly Klacik to replace Democrat Elijah Cummings, who died in office on October 17, 2019. The district has a partisan index of D+26.
- New York's 27th congressional district: Republican Chris Jacobs defeated Democrat Nate McMurray to succeed Republican Chris Collins, who resigned from Congress on October 1, 2019, ahead of his pleading guilty to insider trading. The district has a partisan index of R+11.
- Wisconsin's 7th congressional district: Republican Tom Tiffany defeated Democrat Tricia Zunker to replace Republican Sean Duffy, who announced his resignation effective September 23, 2019, ahead of the birth of his ninth child, who was diagnosed in utero with severe medical complications. The district has a partisan index of R+7.

== State elections ==
=== Gubernatorial ===
↓
23	5	1	7	20
Democrats Not Up	Democrats Up	PNP/R Up	Republicans Up	Republicans Not Up

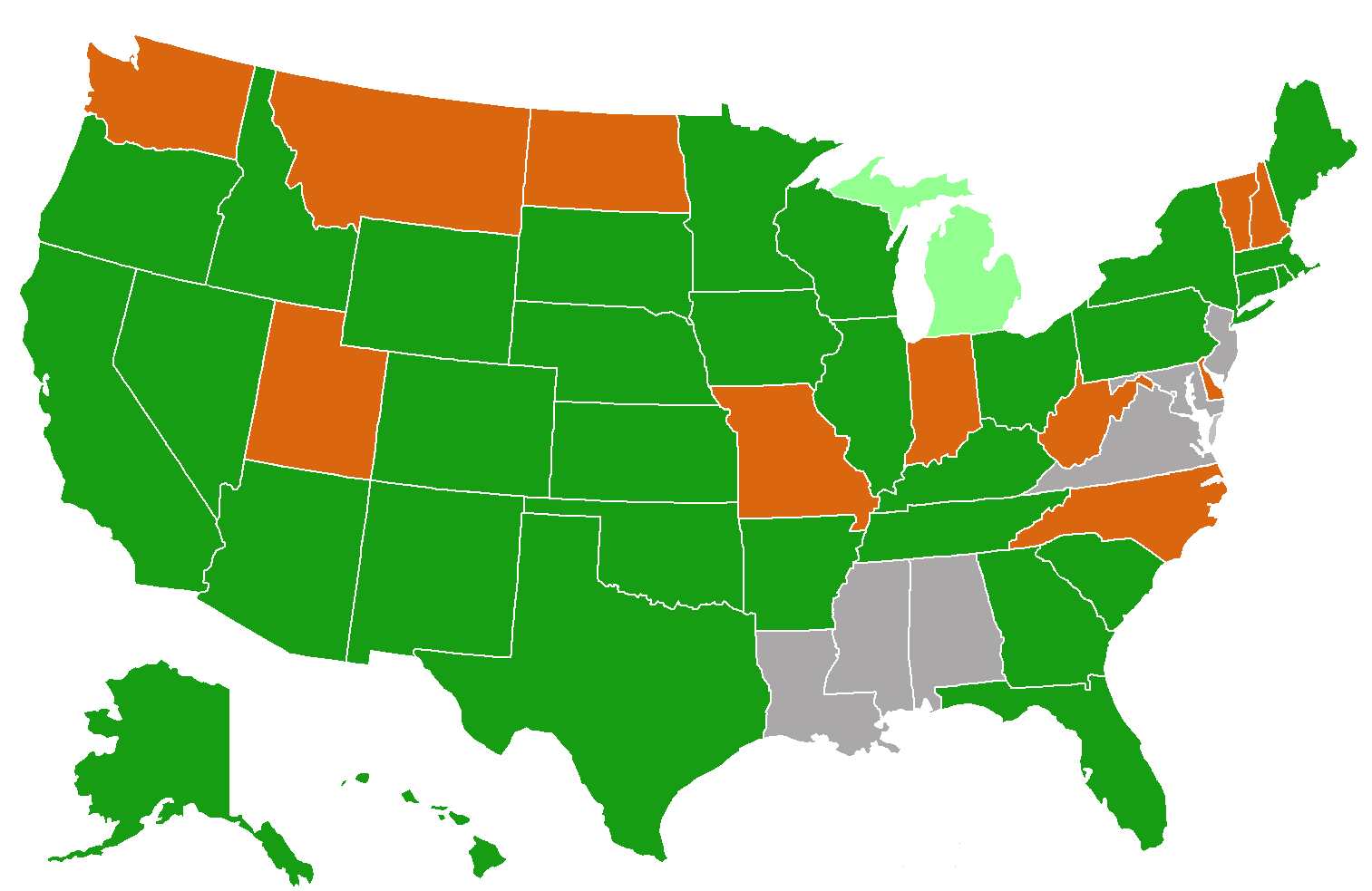
States holding regularly scheduled legislative and gubernatorial elections in 2020: Governor and all legislative chambers All legislative chambers A portion of legislative chambers None (Note: Some or all of the legislative chambers not holding regularly-scheduled elections in 2020 may nonetheless hold special elections in 2020.)

Elections were held for the governorships of 11 U.S. states and two U.S. territories. Most elections were for four-year terms, but the governors of New Hampshire and Vermont each serve two-year terms. Republicans defended a total of seven seats, while Democrats defended six seats. Only one state governorship changed parties, as Republican Greg Gianforte won the 2020 Montana gubernatorial election, succeeding outgoing Democratic governor Steve Bullock. In Puerto Rico, the governorship was retained by the New Progressive Party, although the winning candidate, Pedro Pierluisi, is affiliated with the Democratic Party, replacing an incumbent who was affiliated with the Republican Party.

=== Legislative ===
Regularly scheduled elections were held in 86 of the 99 state legislative chambers in the United States; nationwide, regularly scheduled elections were held for 5,876 of the 7,383 legislative seats. Many legislative chambers had all legislative seats up for election, but some legislative chambers that use staggered elections held elections for only a portion of the total seats in the chamber. (Note: The upper houses of Alaska, Arkansas, California, Colorado, Delaware, Florida, Hawaii, Indiana, Iowa, Kentucky, Missouri, Montana, Nevada, North Dakota, Ohio, Oklahoma, Oregon, Pennsylvania, Tennessee, Texas, Utah, Washington, West Virginia, Wisconsin, and Wyoming held elections for half of the seats in the chamber. The North Dakota House of Representatives is the only lower house in which only half of the seats were up for election. The Illinois Senate held elections for one-third of the seats in the chamber.) Although most states held regularly scheduled elections for both legislative chambers, Alabama, Louisiana, Maryland, Mississippi, New Jersey and Virginia did not hold state legislative elections, and Michigan held elections only for the lower house. Nebraska, the only state that does not have a bicameral state legislature, held elections for half of the seats in its lone legislative chamber.

A total of two legislative chambers changed partisan control in 2020, as Republicans gained control of both chambers in New Hampshire. This represented the fewest partisan changes in state legislatures since 1944.

Prior to the November 2020 elections, Democrats held 15 "trifectas" (control of the governor's office and both legislative chambers), Republicans held 20 trifectas, and 14 states have a divided government. Not included in this tally is Nebraska, as its legislature officially recognizes no party affiliations. Nationwide, Republicans controlled approximately 60 percent of the legislative chambers and 52 percent of the legislative seats. The 2020 elections created two new trifectas, as the New Hampshire and Montana state government shifted from divided government to Republican control.

=== Attorney general ===
Regularly scheduled elections were held in 10 of 43 states that elect attorneys general. The previous attorney general elections for this group of states took place in 2016, except in Vermont where attorneys general only serve two-year terms and last elected their current attorney general in 2018. Nine state attorneys general ran for re-election and eight won, while Republican Tim Fox of Montana could not run again due to term limits and Republican Curtis Hill of Indiana was eliminated in the Republican convention.

No attorneys general offices changed party control in 2020.

=== Secretary of State ===
Regularly scheduled elections were held in 7 of 35 states that elect secretaries of states. The previous secretary of state elections for this group of states took place in 2016, except in Vermont where secretaries of state only serve two-year terms and last elected their current secretary of state in 2018. Five state secretaries of state ran for re-election and all five won, while Republicans Corey Stapleton of Montana and Bev Clarno of Oregon chose to retire.

Democrats picked up the secretary of state office in Oregon.

=== State Treasurer ===
Regularly scheduled elections were held in nine states. The previous state treasurer elections for this group of states took place in 2016, except in Vermont where state treasurers only serve two-year terms and last elected their current state treasurer in 2018. Eight state treasurers ran for re-election and five won, while Republican Kelly Schmidt of North Dakota chose to retire.

Republicans picked up the state treasurer offices in Pennsylvania and West Virginia. While Democrats picked up the state treasurer office in Washington.

=== Other state elections ===
Partisan control of state and territorial governments following the 2020 elections: Democratic trifecta maintained Republican trifecta maintained Republican trifecta established Divided government established Divided government maintained Officially non-partisan, unicameral legislature

In 2020, 82 state supreme court seats are up for election in 35 states. This constitutes 24% of all state supreme court seats in the country. Various other state courts will also hold elections in 2020. Various state executive positions are also up for election in 2020.

=== Referendums and ballot measures ===
In the 2020 Mississippi flag referendum, Mississippi voters adopted a new state flag (pictured), replacing the former state flag, which included a representation of the Confederate battle flag.

In the 2020 elections, voters considered a number of referendums, initiatives, ballot measures, and state constitutional amendments on a variety of topics, ranging from Medicaid expansion to marijuana legalization to voting rights. Since the murder of George Floyd and subsequent protests, there were at least 20 police-related ballot measures across the country, including in California, Illinois, Ohio, Oregon, Pennsylvania, Texas, and Washington.

- In the 2020 Puerto Rican status referendum, Puerto Ricans decisively voted for statehood; the measure was nonbinding (since only Congress may admit a state to the Union) but was a significant step forward in Puerto Rico's effort to become a state.
- Four states legalized marijuana for recreational use: New Jersey, South Dakota, Montana (Montana I-190), and Arizona (Proposition 207). The measures passed by broad margins.
- Oregon became the first U.S. state to decriminalize possession of small amounts of "harder drugs" such as cocaine, heroin, or methamphetamine, making possession a civil violation rather than a criminal offense. The measure also directed revenue raised from marijuana sales taxes to drug addiction treatment.
- Oregon also became the first state to legalize the use of psychedelic mushrooms, with Measure 109 passing with 56% of the vote. The measure allows the regulated use of psychedelic mushrooms by adults over the age of 21 in supervised, therapeutic settings, and requires secure storage at licensed facilities.
- Alabama, Colorado, and Florida voters passed state constitutional amendments narrowing the right to vote in elections by replacing language in the state constitution stating "every citizen" has the right to vote with "only a citizen." These measures had no practical impact since non-citizens were not permitted to vote in U.S. elections before the measures were adopted.
- Colorado voters decided to keep the state in the National Popular Vote Interstate Compact by a 52-to-48 margin, rejecting a repeal effort.
- Voters in Rhode Island decided to remove "and Providence Plantations" from the state's official name.
- In California, voters rejected Proposition 16, a measure to repeal the state ban on affirmative action.
- In California, Proposition 22 passed with 58% of the vote; the measure, which was backed by $200 million from Uber/Postmates, Lyft, DoorDash, and Instacart, reversed a recently passed state law requiring those companies to treat "gig economy" workers as employees (entitled to the full array of employee benefits) rather than as independent contractors.
- In California, Proposition 25, a veto referendum, passed by broad margins, thus nullifying a state bill that would have replaced cash bail with risk assessments for suspects detained pending trial.
- In Mississippi voters overwhelmingly approved a new state flag, replacing the former divisive state flag, which included the Confederate battle flag.
- Missouri voters approved an initiative amending their state constitutions to expand Medicaid under the Patient Protection and Affordable Care Act, circumventing the Republican-dominated state legislature, which had refused to do so. The Missouri constitutional amendment will expand Medicaid access to a quarter-million more adults starting in July 2021.
- Michigan voters approved a legislatively referred state constitutional amendment prohibiting the unreasonable search and seizure of electronic data and electronic communications and requiring state and local police to obtain a search warrant before searching electronic data. The measure, passed with 89% of the vote. Michigan became the 13th state to include privacy protections in a state constitution, and the third state to add such protection by ballot measure.
- Maryland voters approved by a 2–1 margin, a ballot measure to legalize sports betting at stadiums and casinos, with tax proceeds benefiting K-12 public schools; the vote made Maryland the 18th state to legalize sports betting.
- Ballot measures to remove "penal exceptions" from state constitutional prohibitions on slavery (language that allowed slavery as a criminal punishment) passed in Nebraska and Utah, with about 68% and 80% of the vote, respectively. These unenforceable and obsolete provisions were once used for convict leasing and forced prisoner labor.
- Maine voters, in the March 2020 primary ballot, rejected (by a wide margin) a veto referendum that sought to overturn a new Maine state law that eliminated religious and philosophical exemptions from mandatory vaccinations for K-12 and college students and employees of healthcare facilities.
- Alaska voters narrowly approved an initiative to replace partisan primaries with top-four open primaries and ranked-choice voting for state, federal, and presidential level.
- In Florida, a proposed state constitutional amendment to establish open "jungle primaries" (also called "top-two" primaries), with the top two vote-getters advancing to the November ballot (irrespective of party) was defeated; 57% voted to approve, short of the three-fifths (60%) vote required.
- Massachusetts voters rejected Question 2, an initiative to implement ranked-choice voting for future state elections, with about 55% voting against the question. Massachusetts voters approved Question 1 with a 75% "yes" vote, extending the "right to repair" to certain vehicles, extending 2012 legislation and consumers' rights to obtain telematics data.
- Illinois voted against the Illinois Fair Tax, a proposed state amendment championed by Governor J. B. Pritzker, which, had it passed, would have changed the state income tax system from a flat tax to a graduated income tax.
- Georgia approved, by wide margins, ballot questions that aimed to make funds collected from taxes and fees used for their intended projects (passed with 82% of the vote); waived sovereign immunity in cases alleging unconstitutionality of a law; and exempting certain charities from property tax.
- Florida, Arkansas and North Dakota voters defeated legislatively referred measures which would have restricted the ability of citizens to place questions on the ballot or added hurdles to enacting laws via ballot measure. In Florida, voters defeated a measure would have required voters to pass future state constitutional amendments by 60% in two successive elections (rather than one election) in order for the amendment to be adopted. In North Dakota, voters defeated a measure would have required future successful citizen-initiated constitutional amendments to be sent to the legislature for further approval, and would refer those which failed to get legislative approval back to the ballot in the next general election; In Arkansas, voters defeated Issue 3, a measure would have required future ballot initiatives to gain half of the required petition signatures from each of 45 counties instead of the current 15 counties and also raised the threshold for the legislature to place a proposed constitutional amendment on the ballot from a simple majority of both chambers to three-fifths vote of both chambers.

Several proposed referendums failed to secure the necessary number of signatures to appear on ballots due to disruptions and social distancing measures undertaken after the COVID-19 pandemic. These included an effort in Ohio to raise the state's hourly minimum wage from $8.70 to $13; an anti-gerrymandering efforts in Oklahoma and Arkansas; and a California effort to allow electronic signatures for future California ballot measures.

=== Impact on redistricting ===
Following the 2020 United States census, the state delegations to the U.S. House of Representatives will undergo reapportionment, and both the U.S. House of Representatives and the state legislatures will undergo redistricting. In states without redistricting commissions, the legislators and governors elected between 2017 and 2020 will draw the new congressional and state legislative districts that will take effect starting with the 2022 elections. State supreme courts can also have a significant effect on redistricting, as demonstrated in states such as Pennsylvania and Virginia. Thus the 2020 elections had a significant impact on the 2020 United States redistricting cycle. Barring court orders or mid-decade redistricting, the districts drawn in the redistricting cycle will remain in place until the next round of redistricting begins in 2030.

In the 2020 elections, the Republican Party won several legislative chambers and gubernatorial positions that had been selected by Democrats as key redistricting targets. Republicans flipped control of the New Hampshire legislature, defended the governorship of Missouri, retained control of both legislative chambers in Iowa, North Carolina, and Texas, and gained a super-majority in both chambers of the Kansas legislature, giving the party control of the key redistricting institutions in those states. Republicans also retained control of the Pennsylvania legislature and Minnesota Senate, ensuring divided partisan control of redistricting in both states. Additionally, the passage of a referendum in Virginia removed control of redistricting from the Democratic-controlled legislature to an independent commission. However, in New York, Democrats gained a two-thirds super-majority in the State Senate and held their super-majority in the State Assembly, giving the party full control of redistricting.

== Territorial elections ==
The U.S. territories of American Samoa and Puerto Rico held gubernatorial and legislative elections in 2020, while Guam, the Northern Mariana Islands, and the U.S. Virgin Islands held legislative elections. Along with Washington, D.C., each territory also held elections for a non-voting delegate to the U.S. House of Representatives. All non-voting delegates serve two-year terms, with the exception of the Resident Commissioner of Puerto Rico, a non-voting position with a four-year term. Washington, D.C., also held elections for its shadow representative and one of its two shadow senators. The five territories also took part in the 2020 Democratic Party presidential primaries and the 2020 Republican Party presidential primaries.

== Local elections ==
=== Mayoral elections ===
Since the beginning of 2020, various major cities have seen incumbent mayors re-elected, including Bakersfield (Karen Goh), Fremont (Lily Mei), and Sacramento, California (Darrell Steinberg); Baton Rouge, Louisiana (Sharon Weston Broome); Chesapeake (David West), Fairfax City (David Meyer), Fredericksburg (Mary Katherine Greenlaw), Hampton (Donnie Tuck), Richmond (Levar Stoney), and Virginia Beach, Virginia (Bobby Dyer); Glendale (Jerry Weiers), Mesa (John Giles), and Phoenix, Arizona (Kate Gallego); Irving (Rick Stopfer) and Lubbock, Texas (Dan Pope); Milwaukee (Tom Barrett), and Kenosha, Wisconsin (John Antaramian); Portland, Oregon (Ted Wheeler); Salt Lake County, Utah (Jenny Wilson); Wilmington, Delaware (Mike Purzycki); Winston-Salem, North Carolina (Allen Joines); and Bayamón, Puerto Rico (Ramón Luis Rivera Jr.).

In Norfolk, Virginia, Mayor Kenny Alexander was unopposed in seeking reelection, as was Mayor John Cruz in Hagåtña, Guam. In Tulsa, Oklahoma, incumbent mayor G. T. Bynum earned reelection by winning an outright majority in the August primary.

Open mayoral seats were won in Clearwater (Frank Hibbard) and Miami-Dade County, Florida (Daniella Levine Cava); Fresno (Jerry Dyer), Riverside (Patricia Lock Dawson), San Diego (Todd Gloria), and Santa Ana, California (Vicente Sarmiento); Gilbert (Brigette Peterson) and Scottsdale, Arizona (David Ortega); Honolulu, Hawaiʻi (Rick Blangiardi); and San Juan, Puerto Rico (Miguel Romero).

In Baltimore, Maryland, city council president Democrat Brandon Scott was elected to replace incumbent Democrat Jack Young who came in fifth in a crowded primary. In Stockton, California, Kevin Lincoln defeated one-term incumbent mayor Michael Tubbs, who was first Black mayor of the city and the youngest person elected to the position when he unseated incumbent mayor Anthony Silva in 2016. In Texas, two mayoral runoff elections in December saw incumbents defeated: In Corpus Christi, city councilwoman Paulette Guajardo defeated incumbent Joe McComb, and in El Paso, former mayor Oscar Leeser unseated one-term incumbent Dee Margo. In Ely, Minnesota, Eric Urbas defeated three-term incumbent mayor Chuck Novack despite Urbas having dropped out of the race in August. In Rabbit Hash, Kentucky, incumbent Brynneth Pawltro was ousted by Wilbur Beast, a 6-month-old French Bulldog. The town has never had a human mayor; Pawltro is a pit bull terrier.

==== Mayoral recalls ====
Several mayors faced recall campaigns during 2020. Mayors in Broken Bow, Nebraska; Diamond City, Arkansas; Heyburn, Idaho; and Oregon City, Oregon, were removed from office. Mayors in Elizabeth and Idaho Springs, Colorado; Humboldt, Nebraska; Powers, Oregon; Stevensville, Montana; and Westminster, California were retained in office.

=== Other elections and referendums ===
- More than a dozen cities and counties voted on police reform and accountability measures, including referendums creating new police civilian review boards, strengthening the oversight powers of existing boards (such as granting subpoena powers), requiring the public disclosure of body-camera video after incidents of police use of force, and allocating police funding to community initiatives. Most of the ballot questions passed, including measures in Oakland, San Francisco, San Diego, San Jose, and Sonoma County in California; King County, Washington; Portland, Oregon; Kyle, Texas; and Philadelphia and Pittsburgh, Pennsylvania.
- Voters in Washington, D.C., re-elected shadow senator Paul Strauss and elected Oye Owolewa as its shadow representative. These shadow positions are charged with lobbying Congress for D.C. statehood.
- D.C. voters approved Initiative 81, an initiative that designated the enforcement of laws against entheogens (psychedelics), including psilocybin mushrooms, peyote, and ayahuasca, as "among the Metropolitan Police Department's lowest law enforcement priorities." The measure passed with 76% of the vote.

== Tribal elections ==
A number of Native American tribal governments held elections for tribal leadership in 2020. As with other elections in the country, the coronavirus pandemic disrupted many elections, delaying primaries and shifting some voting from in-person to postal.

The Fort McDowell Yavapai Nation reelected President Bernadine Burnette; the Sault Ste. Marie Tribe of Chippewa Indians reelected Tribal Chairman Aaron A. Payment; Oneida Nation of Wisconsin reelected Chairman Tehassi Hill; the Bois Forte Band of Chippewa reelected Tribal Chair Cathy Chavers; the Wichita and Affiliated Tribes reelected President Terri Parton; the Sitka Tribe of Alaska reelected Tribal Chairman Lawrence "Woody" Widmark; and incumbent Tribal Chief Donald (Doc) Slyter was unopposed in seeking reelection to lead the Confederated Tribes of Coos, Lower Umpqua and Siuslaw Indians. Stephanie Bryan, the first woman to serve as chair of the Poarch Band of Creek Indians, also won reelection. United Keetoowah Band of Cherokee Indians incumbent Tribal Chief Joe Bunch, who was impeached but not removed from office in January 2020, was re-elected.

In a runoff election, former South Dakota state senator Kevin Killer defeated incumbent Oglala Lakota Tribe president Julian Running Bear, who made the runoff by a single vote after surviving an impeachment effort in September. Crow Nation Senator Frank White Clay defeated incumbent tribal chairman A.J. Not Afraid Jr. Kristopher Peters was elected Squaxin Island Tribe tribal council chairman, defeating incumbent Arnold Cooper, and Joseph Tali Byrd defeated long-time Quapaw Nation Business Committee Chairman John Berrey. Durell Cooper defeated incumbent Apache Tribe of Oklahoma Tribal Chairman Bobby Komardley. Walter R. Echo-Hawk was unopposed in a special election for president of the Pawnee Nation of Oklahoma Business Council following the April 2020 recall of the prior president, James Whiteshirt. The Shakopee Mdewakanton Sioux Community elected Keith Anderson tribal chairman, replacing the retiring Charlie Vig.

Three Minnesota Chippewa Tribe bands had candidates win more than 50% of the votes in June primaries, eliminating the need for a general election: Leech Lake Band of Ojibwe incumbent tribal chair Faron Jackson Sr., White Earth Nation incumbent chief executive Michael Fairbanks, and, on the Grand Portage Indian Reservation, challenger Bobby Deschampe, who defeated incumbent tribal chair Beth Drost.

Northern Cheyenne voters elected five women to the tribal council, along with electing Donna Marie Fisher as tribal president and Serena Wetherelt as vice president. It is the first time women will make up the majority on the Northern Cheyenne tribal council.

=== Tribal referendums ===
- In March, the Oglala Lakota Tribe approved a referendum allowing medical and recreational marijuana while also opposing a referendum allowing alcohol sales at the Prairie Wind Casino on the Pine Ridge Reservation.
- In July, Oneida Nation of Wisconsin voters approved a referendum supporting a long-range Oneida language initiative.
- In October, the Yurok Tribe narrowly approved a referendum supporting establishment of a cannabis marketplace on tribal land.

== Impact of the COVID-19 pandemic ==
Starting in March 2020, elections across the United States were delayed and disrupted by the COVID-19 pandemic. Numerous states delayed presidential primaries, while Alabama delayed the Republican primary Senatorial run-off and North Carolina and Mississippi delayed Republican primary run-off for congressional seats. Iowa, Missouri, South Carolina, and Texas all delayed municipal elections, and in New York City the special election for Queens borough president was cancelled. The pandemic also led to the postponement of the 2020 Democratic National Convention, and both the 2020 Democratic National Convention and the 2020 Republican National Convention were held virtually.

California Governor Gavin Newsom speaks about the decision to sign an executive order requiring mail-in voting in the 2020 November election.

To help enforce social distancing, many states expanded absentee and vote-by-mail options for 2020 primary elections and the November general elections. Several elections, including Democratic primaries in Alaska and Hawaiʻi, as well as the Maryland 7th congressional district special election, were conducted entirely with mail-in ballots only.

While the pandemic was impacting a number of things in elections 2020, Donald Trump was reported of planning to host his Election Night party at the White House. Two officials informed that Trump was planning a large indoor party of nearly 400 people at the East Room. The Trump Hotel on Pennsylvania Avenue was initially chosen as the venue, but this was later changed due to COVID-19 restrictions that limited such gatherings to 50 people.

== Turnout ==
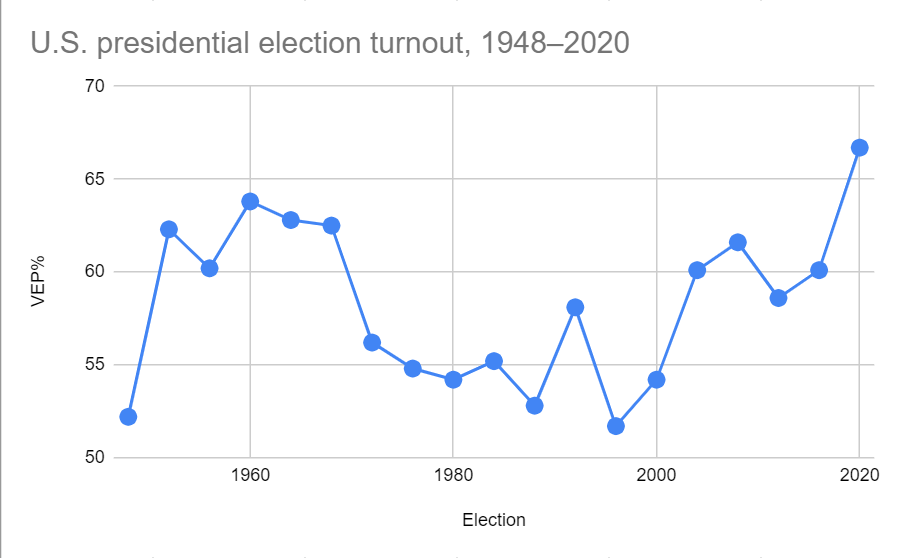
Turnout by voting eligible population (VEP) in U.S. presidential elections since 1948.

With many states easing rules on early voting in the midst of the COVID-19 pandemic, the 2020 election saw an unprecedented rate of early voting. By October 26, with eight days remaining until the election, the total early vote throughout the United States had eclipsed that of 2016. In total, about 100 million voters cast early votes, compared to the approximately 57 million early votes cast in 2016. Democrats disproportionately voted by mail, while Republicans tended to vote more frequently in person.

Just under 160 million people voted in the 2020 elections, compared to a turnout of approximately 137 million in the 2016 presidential election. Michael McDonald projects that about 67% of the voting eligible population voted in 2020, the highest rate of voter participation since the 1952 election. The 2020 elections saw the highest rate of voter participation by voting eligible population since the ratification of the Voting Rights Act of 1965, which prohibits racial discrimination in voting, and the Twenty-sixth Amendment, which effectively lowered the national voting age from 21 to 18.

== Public perceptions and analysis ==
In a poll conducted in 2019, 59% of respondents expressed that they are not confident in the "honesty of U.S. elections". In an August 2020 survey, 49% of respondents said that they expect voting to be "difficult", up from 15% in 2018; 75% of Republicans, but less than half of Democrats were confident that the elections "will be conducted fairly and accurately". In an October 2020 survey, 47% of respondents disagreed with the statement that the election "is likely to be fair and honest", 51% would not "generally agree on who is the legitimately elected president of the United States"; 56% said that they expect "an increase in violence as a result of the election". 49% of college students polled in September 2020 said that the elections won't be "fair and open", 55% that "it will not be administered well", and 81% that "special interest groups have more influence over election outcomes than voters".

According to an October 2020 poll, eight out of ten Americans consider misinformation a "major problem"; Biden supporters were more likely than Trump supporters to trust the news media and their candidate's messaging.

Historian Timothy Snyder, an expert on authoritarianism, said that "it's important not to talk about this as just an election. It's an election surrounded by the authoritarian language of a coup d'etat. [...] [Trump] seems pretty sure he won't win the election, [but] he doesn't want to leave the office." According to Snyder, in order to overcome Trump's "authoritarian's instinct", the opposition "has to win the election and it has to win the aftermath of the election."

According to political scientist Gary C. Jacobson, "The 2020 elections extended several long-term trends in American electoral politics that were driven to new extremes by the singularly divisive person and presidency of Donald J. Trump. The election set new records for electoral continuity, party loyalty, nationalization, polarization, and presidential influence on the down-ballot vote choices, to the point where local factors such as incumbency, candidate quality, and campaign spending barely registered in the congressional election results."

== Table of state, territorial, and federal results ==
This table shows the partisan results of president, congressional, gubernatorial, and state legislative races held in each state and territory in 2020. Note that not all states and territories held gubernatorial, state legislative, and U.S. Senate elections in 2020. The five territories and Washington, D.C., do not elect members of the U.S. Senate, and the territories do not take part in presidential elections; instead, they each elect one non-voting member of the House. Nebraska's unicameral legislature and the governorship and legislature of American Samoa are elected on a non-partisan basis and therefore political party affiliation is not listed.

Subdivision and PVI		Before 2020 elections				After 2020 elections				
Subdivision	PVI	Governor	State leg.	U.S. Senate	U.S. House	Pres. (Note: This column reflects the individual who won a plurality of the state's popular vote in the 2020 presidential election.)	Governor	State leg.	U.S. Senate	U.S. House
Alabama	R+14	Rep	Rep	Split	Rep 6–1	Rep	Rep	Rep	Rep	Rep 6–1
Alaska	R+9	Rep	Split	Rep	Rep 1–0	Rep	Rep	Split (Note: Republicans won a majority of seats in the state house, but they will continue organizing under a coalition caucus in the next session of the Alaska legislature.)	Rep	Rep 1–0
Arizona	R+5	Rep	Rep	Split	Dem 5–4	Dem	Rep	Rep	Dem	Dem 5–4
Arkansas	R+15	Rep	Rep	Rep	Rep 4–0	Rep	Rep	Rep	Rep	Rep 4–0
California	D+12	Dem	Dem	Dem	Dem 45–7	Dem	Dem	Dem	Dem	Dem 42–11
Colorado	D+1	Dem	Dem	Split	Dem 4–3	Dem	Dem	Dem	Dem	Dem 4–3
Connecticut	D+6	Dem	Dem	Dem	Dem 5–0	Dem	Dem	Dem	Dem	Dem 5–0
Delaware	D+6	Dem	Dem	Dem	Dem 1–0	Dem	Dem	Dem	Dem	Dem 1–0
Florida	R+2	Rep	Rep	Rep	Rep 14–13	Rep	Rep	Rep	Rep	Rep 16–11
Georgia	R+5	Rep	Rep	Rep	Rep 8–4	Dem	Rep	Rep	Dem	Rep 8–6
Hawaii	D+18	Dem	Dem	Dem	Dem 2–0	Dem	Dem	Dem	Dem	Dem 2–0
Idaho	R+19	Rep	Rep	Rep	Rep 2–0	Rep	Rep	Rep	Rep	Rep 2–0
Illinois	D+7	Dem	Dem	Dem	Dem 13–5	Dem	Dem	Dem	Dem	Dem 13–5
Indiana	R+9	Rep	Rep	Rep	Rep 7–2	Rep	Rep	Rep	Rep	Rep 7–2
Iowa	R+3	Rep	Rep	Rep	Dem 3–1	Rep	Rep	Rep	Rep	Rep 3–1
Kansas	R+13	Dem	Rep	Rep	Rep 3–1	Rep	Dem	Rep	Rep	Rep 3–1
Kentucky	R+15	Dem	Rep	Rep	Rep 5–1	Rep	Dem	Rep	Rep	Rep 5–1
Louisiana	R+11	Dem	Rep	Rep	Rep 5–1	Rep	Dem	Rep	Rep	Rep 5–1
Maine	D+3	Dem	Dem	Split R/I (Note: One of Maine's senators, Susan Collins, is a Republican. The other senator from Maine, Angus King, is an independent who has caucused with the Democrats since taking office in 2013.)	Dem 2–0	Dem (Note: Three of Maine's four electoral votes were called for Biden, while the remaining electoral vote was called for Trump.)	Dem	Dem	Split R/I	Dem 2–0
Maryland	D+12	Rep	Dem	Dem	Dem 7–1	Dem	Rep	Dem	Dem	Dem 7–1
Massachusetts	D+12	Rep	Dem	Dem	Dem 9–0	Dem	Rep	Dem	Dem	Dem 9–0
Michigan	D+1	Dem	Rep	Dem	Dem 7–6–1	Dem	Dem	Rep	Dem	Split 7–7
Minnesota	D+1	Dem	Split	Dem	Dem 5–3	Dem	Dem	Split	Dem	Split 4–4
Mississippi	R+9	Rep	Rep	Rep	Rep 3–1	Rep	Rep	Rep	Rep	Rep 3–1
Missouri	R+9	Rep	Rep	Rep	Rep 6–2	Rep	Rep	Rep	Rep	Rep 6–2
Montana	R+11	Dem	Rep	Split	Rep 1–0	Rep	Rep	Rep	Split	Rep 1–0
Nebraska	R+14	Rep	NP	Rep	Rep 3–0	Rep (Note: Four of Nebraska's electoral votes were called for Trump, while one of its electoral votes was called for Biden.)	Rep	NP	Rep	Rep 3–0
Nevada	D+1	Dem	Dem	Dem	Dem 3–1	Dem	Dem	Dem	Dem	Dem 3–1
New Hampshire	Even	Rep	Dem	Dem	Dem 2–0	Dem	Rep	Rep	Dem	Dem 2–0
New Jersey	D+7	Dem	Dem	Dem	Dem 10–2	Dem	Dem	Dem	Dem	Dem 10–2
New Mexico	D+3	Dem	Dem	Dem	Dem 3–0	Dem	Dem	Dem	Dem	Dem 2–1
New York	D+11	Dem	Dem	Dem	Dem 21–6	Dem	Dem	Dem	Dem	Dem 19–8
North Carolina	R+3	Dem	Rep	Rep	Rep 9–3	Rep	Dem	Rep	Rep	Rep 8–5
North Dakota	R+17	Rep	Rep	Rep	Rep 1–0	Rep	Rep	Rep	Rep	Rep 1–0
Ohio	R+3	Rep	Rep	Split	Rep 12–4	Rep	Rep	Rep	Split	Rep 12–4
Oklahoma	R+20	Rep	Rep	Rep	Rep 4–1	Rep	Rep	Rep	Rep	Rep 5–0
Oregon	D+5	Dem	Dem	Dem	Dem 4–1	Dem	Dem	Dem	Dem	Dem 4–1
Pennsylvania	Even	Dem	Rep	Split	Split 9–9	Dem	Dem	Rep	Split	Split 9–9
Rhode Island	D+10	Dem	Dem	Dem	Dem 2–0	Dem	Dem	Dem	Dem	Dem 2–0
South Carolina	R+8	Rep	Rep	Rep	Rep 5–2	Rep	Rep	Rep	Rep	Rep 6–1
South Dakota	R+14	Rep	Rep	Rep	Rep 1–0	Rep	Rep	Rep	Rep	Rep 1–0
Tennessee	R+14	Rep	Rep	Rep	Rep 7–2	Rep	Rep	Rep	Rep	Rep 7–2
Texas	R+8	Rep	Rep	Rep	Rep 22–13	Rep	Rep	Rep	Rep	Rep 23–13
Utah	R+20	Rep	Rep	Rep	Rep 3–1	Rep	Rep	Rep	Rep	Rep 4–0
Vermont	D+15	Rep	Dem	Split D/I (Note: One of Vermont's senators, Patrick Leahy, is a Democrat. The other senator from Vermont, Bernie Sanders, was elected as an independent and has caucused with the Democrats since taking office in 2007.)	Dem 1–0	Dem	Rep	Dem	Split D/I	Dem 1–0
Virginia	D+1	Dem	Dem	Dem	Dem 7–4	Dem	Dem	Dem	Dem	Dem 7–4
Washington	D+7	Dem	Dem	Dem	Dem 7–3	Dem	Dem	Dem	Dem	Dem 7–3
West Virginia	R+20	Rep	Rep	Split	Rep 3–0	Rep	Rep	Rep	Split	Rep 3–0
Wisconsin	Even	Dem	Rep	Split	Rep 5–3	Dem	Dem	Rep	Split	Rep 5–3
Wyoming	R+25	Rep	Rep	Rep	Rep 1–0	Rep	Rep	Rep	Rep	Rep 1–0
United States	Even	Rep 26–24	Rep 28–19–2	Rep 53–47 (Note: Prior to the 2020 Senate elections, the Democratic Senate caucus consisted of 45 Democrats and two independents.)	Dem 232–197	Dem	Rep 27–23	Rep 29–18–2	Dem 50–50	Dem 222–213
Washington, D.C.	D+43	Dem (Note: Washington, D.C., does not elect a governor or state legislature, but it does elect a mayor and a city council.)	Dem	—N/a	Dem	Dem	Dem	Dem	—N/a	Dem
American Samoa	—N/a	NP/D (Note: Although elections for governor of American Samoa are non-partisan, Governor Lolo Matalasi Moliga has affiliated with the Democratic Party at the national level since re-election in 2016.)	NP	—N/a	Rep	—N/a	NP/D (Note: Although elections for governor of American Samoa are non-partisan, Governor Lemanu Peleti Mauga affiliates with the Democratic Party at the national level.)	NP	—N/a	Rep
Guam	—N/a	Dem	Dem	—N/a	Dem	Dem (Note: Although Guam does not have a vote in the Electoral College, the territory has held a presidential advisory vote for every presidential election since 1980.)	Dem	Dem	—N/a	Dem
N. Mariana Islands	—N/a	Rep	Rep	—N/a	Ind (Note: The Northern Mariana Islands' delegate to Congress, Gregorio Sablan, was elected as an Independent and has caucused with the Democrats since taking office in 2009.)	—N/a	Rep	Split (Note: Republicans hold a nominal majority in the Northern Mariana Islands House of Representatives with nine seats and Democrats with eight seats; however, one independent caucuses with the Republicans and two with the Democrats, leaving the House split 10–10. One Republican crossed party lines to elect Democrat-aligned Independent Edmund Villagomez as Speaker of the House. With five seats, Republicans maintained control of the Northern Mariana Islands Senate where a Democrat won one seat in 2020 and independents hold the remaining three seats.)	—N/a	Ind
Puerto Rico	—N/a	PNP/R (Note: Puerto Rican Governor Wanda Vázquez Garced, who became governor after Pedro Pierluisi's succession of Ricardo Rosselló was deemed unconstitutional, is a member of the Puerto Rican New Progressive Party, but affiliates with the Republican Party at the national level.)	PNP	—N/a	PNP/R (Note: Puerto Rico's Resident Commissioner, Jenniffer González, was elected as a member of the New Progressive Party and has caucused with the Republicans since taking office in 2017.)	—N/a	PNP/D (Note: Puerto Rican Governor-elect Pedro Pierluisi is a member of the Puerto Rican New Progressive Party, but affiliates with the Democratic Party at the national level.)	PDP	—N/a	PNP/R
U.S. Virgin Islands	—N/a	Dem	Dem	—N/a	Dem	—N/a	Dem	Dem	—N/a	Dem
Subdivision	PVI	Governor	State leg.	U.S. Senate	U.S. House	President	Governor	State leg.	U.S. Senate	U.S. House
Subdivision and PVI		Before 2020 elections				After 2020 elections				

=== Table of partisan control of state legislatures ===
Subdivision			Before 2020 elections (Note: Partisan seat figures were compiled in August 2020.)				After 2020 elections			
Subdivision	PVI	% Pop.	Governor	Upper house	Lower house	Overall	Governor	Upper house	Lower house	Overall
Alabama	R+14	1.48	Rep	Rep 27–8	Rep 75–28	Rep	Rep	Rep	Rep	Rep
Alaska	R+9	0.22	Rep	Rep 13–7	Coal. 22–17 (Note: The Alaska House of Representatives is controlled by a coalition of Democrats, Republicans, and independents. The minority caucus consists of Republicans who are not part of the majority coalition.)	Div	Rep	Rep	Coal.	Div
Arizona	R+5	2.19	Rep	Rep 17–13	Rep 31–29	Rep	Rep	Rep	Rep	Rep
Arkansas	R+15	0.91	Rep	Rep 26–9	Rep 75–23	Rep	Rep	Rep	Rep	Rep
California	D+12	11.91	Dem	Dem 29–11	Dem 61–17–1	Dem	Dem	Dem	Dem	Dem
Colorado	D+1	1.74	Dem	Dem 19–16	Dem 41–24	Dem	Dem	Dem	Dem	Dem
Connecticut	D+6	1.07	Dem	Dem 22–14	Dem 91–60	Dem	Dem	Dem	Dem	Dem
Delaware	D+6	0.29	Dem	Dem 12–9	Dem 26–15	Dem	Dem	Dem	Dem	Dem
Florida	R+2	6.47	Rep	Rep 23–17	Rep 73–46	Rep	Rep	Rep	Rep	Rep
Georgia	R+5	3.2	Rep	Rep 35–21	Rep 105–75	Rep	Rep	Rep	Rep	Rep
Hawaii	D+18	0.43	Dem	Dem 24–1	Dem 46–5	Dem	Dem	Dem	Dem	Dem
Idaho	R+19	0.54	Rep	Rep 28–7	Rep 56–14	Rep	Rep	Rep	Rep	Rep
Illinois	D+7	3.82	Dem	Dem 40–19	Dem 73–44	Dem	Dem	Dem	Dem	Dem
Indiana	R+9	2.03	Rep	Rep 40–10	Rep 67–33	Rep	Rep	Rep	Rep	Rep
Iowa	R+3	0.95	Rep	Rep 32–18	Rep 53–47	Rep	Rep	Rep	Rep	Rep
Kansas	R+13	0.88	Dem	Rep 29–11	Rep 84–41	Div	Dem	Rep	Rep	Div
Kentucky	R+15	1.35	Dem	Rep 28–10	Rep 62–38	Div	Dem	Rep	Rep	Div
Louisiana	R+11	1.4	Dem	Rep 27–12	Rep 68–35–2	Div	Dem	Rep	Rep	Div
Maine	D+3	0.41	Dem	Dem 21–14	Dem 88–57–6	Dem	Dem	Dem	Dem	Dem
Maryland	D+12	1.82	Rep	Dem 32–14	Dem 99–42	Div	Rep	Dem	Dem	Div
Massachusetts	D+12	2.09	Rep	Dem 36–4	Dem 127–31–1	Div	Rep	Dem	Dem	Div
Michigan	D+1	3.01	Dem	Rep 22–16	Rep 58–51	Div	Dem	Rep	Rep	Div
Minnesota	D+1	1.7	Dem	Rep 35–32	Dem 75–59	Div	Dem	Rep	Dem	Div
Mississippi	R+9	0.9	Rep	Rep 36–16	Rep 76–45–1	Rep	Rep	Rep	Rep	Rep
Missouri	R+9	1.85	Rep	Rep 23–8	Rep 113–48	Rep	Rep	Rep	Rep	Rep
Montana	R+11	0.32	Dem	Rep 30–20	Rep 57–43	Div	Rep	Rep	Rep	Rep
Nebraska	R+14	0.58	Rep	NP (Note: Nebraska has a unicameral, officially non-partisan legislature. For this reason, Nebraska is not included in the overall tallies of partisan control (except for governor) and the overall control column is labeled as "N/A".)		—N/a	Rep	NP		—N/a
Nevada	D+1	0.93	Dem	Dem 13–8	Dem 29–13	Dem	Dem	Dem	Dem	Dem
New Hampshire	Even	0.41	Rep	Dem 14–10	Dem 231–158–1	Div	Rep	Rep	Rep	Rep
New Jersey	D+7	2.68	Dem	Dem 25–15	Dem 52–28	Dem	Dem	Dem	Dem	Dem
New Mexico	D+3	0.63	Dem	Dem 26–16	Dem 45–24	Dem	Dem	Dem	Dem	Dem
New York	D+11	5.86	Dem	Dem 40–20	Dem 103–42–1	Dem	Dem	Dem	Dem	Dem
North Carolina	R+3	3.16	Dem	Rep 28–21	Rep 64–55	Div	Dem	Rep	Rep	Div
North Dakota	R+17	0.23	Rep	Rep 37–10	Rep 79–15	Rep	Rep	Rep	Rep	Rep
Ohio	R+3	3.52	Rep	Rep 24–9	Rep 61–38	Rep	Rep	Rep	Rep	Rep
Oklahoma	R+20	1.19	Rep	Rep 38–9	Rep 77–23	Rep	Rep	Rep	Rep	Rep
Oregon	D+5	1.27	Dem	Dem 18–12	Dem 38–22	Dem	Dem	Dem	Dem	Dem
Pennsylvania	Even	3.86	Dem	Rep 28–21–1	Rep 109–93	Div	Dem	Rep	Rep	Div
Rhode Island	D+10	0.32	Dem	Dem 33–5	Dem 66–9	Dem	Dem	Dem	Dem	Dem
South Carolina	R+8	1.55	Rep	Rep 27–19	Rep 78–44	Rep	Rep	Rep	Rep	Rep
South Dakota	R+14	0.27	Rep	Rep 30–5	Rep 59–11	Rep	Rep	Rep	Rep	Rep
Tennessee	R+14	2.06	Rep	Rep 28–5	Rep 73–26	Rep	Rep	Rep	Rep	Rep
Texas	R+8	8.74	Rep	Rep 19–11	Rep 84–66	Rep	Rep	Rep	Rep	Rep
Utah	R+20	0.97	Rep	Rep 23–6	Rep 59–16	Rep	Rep	Rep	Rep	Rep
Vermont	D+15	0.19	Rep	Dem 22–6–1	Dem 94–44–12	Div	Rep	Dem	Dem	Div
Virginia	D+1	2.57	Dem	Dem 21–19	Dem 55–45	Dem	Dem	Dem	Dem	Dem
Washington	D+7	2.29	Dem	Dem 29–20	Dem 57–41	Dem	Dem	Dem	Dem	Dem
West Virginia	R+20	0.54	Rep	Rep 20–14	Rep 58–41–1	Rep	Rep	Rep	Rep	Rep
Wisconsin	Even	1.75	Dem	Rep 18–13	Rep 63–35	Div	Dem	Rep	Rep	Div
Wyoming	R+25	0.17	Rep	Rep 27–3	Rep 50–9–1	Rep	Rep	Rep	Rep	Rep
U.S. states	—N/a	98.71	Rep 26–24	Rep 30–19	Rep 28–21 (Note: Republicans controlled the lower house in 29 states, Democrats controlled the lower house in 20 states, and one state, Alaska, had a lower house controlled by a coalition.)	Rep 20–15 (Note: Republicans held a trifecta in 20 states, Democrats held a trifecta in 15 states, and 14 states had a divided government.)	Rep 27–23	Rep 31–18	Rep 29–20	Rep 22–15
Washington, D.C.	D+43	0.21	Dem	Dem		Dem	Dem	Dem		Dem
American Samoa	—N/a	0.02	NP/D (Note: Although elections for governor of American Samoa are non-partisan, Governor Lolo Matalasi Moliga has affiliated with the Democratic Party at the national level since re-election in 2016. He is counted as a Democrat for the overall tally.)	NP	NP	NP	NP/D	NP	NP	NP
Guam	—N/a	0.05	Dem	Dem		Dem	Dem	Dem		Dem
N. Mariana Islands	—N/a	0.02	Rep	Rep	Rep	Rep	Rep	Rep	Div	Div
Puerto Rico	—N/a	0.96	PNP/R (Note: Puerto Rican Governor Wanda Vázquez Garced is a member of the Puerto Rican New Progressive Party and affiliates with the Republican Party at the national level. She is counted as a Republican in the overall tally.)	PNP	PNP	PNP	PNP/D	Div	PDP	Div
U.S. Virgin Islands	—N/a	0.03	Dem	Dem		Dem	Dem	Dem		Dem
United States	Even	100	28–28	Rep 31–22 (Note: The upper house tally includes the unicameral legislatures of Washington, D.C., Guam, and the U.S. Virgin Islands.)	Rep 30–20	Rep 21–18	28–28	Rep 32–21	Rep 29–20	Rep 22–18
Subdivision	PVI	% Pop.	Governor	Upper house	Lower house	Overall	Governor	Upper house	Lower house	Overall
Subdivision			Before 2020 elections				After 2020 elections			

=== Partisan control of statewide offices ===
	Before election					After election				
State	Attorney general	Governor	Lieutenant governor	Auditor	Treasurer	Attorney general	Governor	Lieutenant governor	Auditor	Treasurer
Indiana	Rep	Rep	Rep	Rep	Rep	Rep	Rep	Rep	Rep	Rep
Missouri	Rep	Rep	Rep	Dem	Rep	Rep	Rep	Rep	Dem	Rep
Montana	Rep	Dem	Dem	Rep		Rep	Rep	Rep	Rep	
North Carolina	Dem	Dem	Rep	Dem	Rep	Dem	Dem	Rep	Dem	Rep
Oregon	Dem	Dem	Rep (Secretary of State)		Dem	Dem	Dem	Dem (Secretary of State)		Dem
Pennsylvania	Dem	Dem	Dem	Dem	Dem	Dem	Dem	Dem	Rep	Rep
Utah	Rep	Rep	Rep	Rep	Rep	Rep	Rep	Rep	Rep	Rep
Vermont	Dem	Rep	Pro	Dem	Dem	Dem	Rep	Dem	Dem	Dem
Washington	Dem	Dem	Dem	Dem	Rep	Dem	Dem	Dem	Dem	Dem
West Virginia	Rep	Rep	Rep (Secretary of State)	Rep	Dem	Rep	Rep	Rep (Secretary of State)	Rep	Rep

== See also ==
- Attempts to overturn the 2020 United States presidential election
- Russian interference in the 2020 United States elections
- Voter suppression in the United States, 2019–2020
