= Carlos Villapudua =

American politician

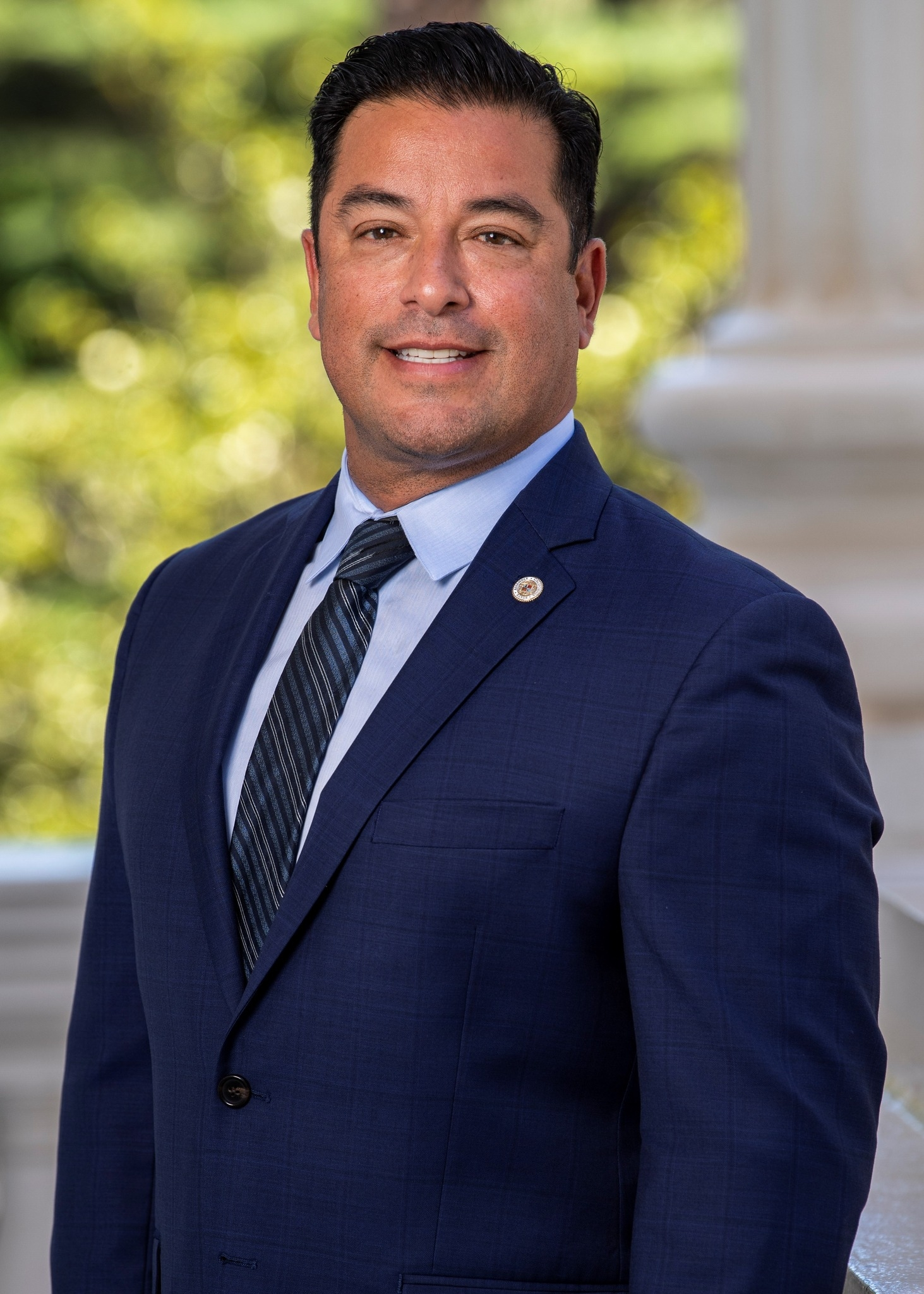

Member of the California State Assembly from the 13th district
- In office December 7, 2020 – November 30, 2024
- Preceded by: Susan Eggman
- Succeeded by: Rhodesia Ransom

Member of the San Joaquin County Board of Supervisors for the 1st district
- In office 2008–2016
- Preceded by: Steve Guttierez
- Succeeded by: Miguel Villapudua

Personal details
- Born: March 10, 1968 (age 58) Stockton, California, U.S.
- Party: Democratic
- Spouse: Edith
- Education: California State University, Sacramento (BA)

Carlos Villapudua (born March 10, 1968) is an American politician who served in the California State Assembly from 2020 to 2024. A Democrat, he represented the 13th Assembly District, which encompasses western San Joaquin County, including the city of Stockton.

== Early life and education ==
Villapudua was born in Stockton, California. He received a Bachelor of Arts in social services from the California State University, Sacramento in 1997.

== Career ==
Villapudua worked as a legislative assistant for Supervisor Steve Guttierez, then served two terms as a member of the San Joaquin County Board of Supervisors and was CEO of the San Joaquin County Hispanic Chamber of Commerce.

=== 2016 Stockton mayoral election ===
Villapudua ran for Mayor of Stockton in 2016. He placed third in the first round election with 24.10% of the vote, behind eventual winner Michael Tubbs and incumbent Anthony Silva respectively.

=== California State Assembly ===
==== Campaigns ====
Villapudua first ran for California State Assembly in 2018, challenging incumbent Democrat Susan Eggman in the 13th Assembly District. He placed third in the primary election with 16.9% of the vote, behind Eggman and Republican Antonio Garcia respectively.

In 2020, Eggman retired to successfully run for California State Senate. Villapudua ran for Assembly again and won, defeating County Supervisor Kathy Miller with 53% of the vote.

In 2022, he was re-elected and defeated Tracy City Council member Veronica Vargas with 60.6% of the vote.

==== Tenure ====
Villapudua introduced legislation that would allow certain prisoners to engage in job training and other activities in a community campus on prison grounds. In The Georgetown Law Journal, Shirin Bakhshay writes "While Villapudua's bill is commendable, his comments [on rehabilitating prisoners] reflect the type of thinking about criminal actors that continues to impede wide-spread reform efforts..."

==== 2024 California State Senate campaign ====
Villapudua's wife, Edith, was a candidate for California State Senate in the 5th district, the seat Eggman is vacating due to term-limits. The couple switched races on the day before California's candidate filing deadline, with Carlos running for Senate and Edith running for his Assembly seat. The move was characterized as a ploy to better each of their electoral prospects; however it drove former U.S. Representative Jerry McNerney to join the Senate race and Edith's original opponent, Rhodesia Ransom, to also switch into the Assembly election. Despite the last-minute switch, both he and his wife lost their respective races.

== Personal life ==
Villapudua lives in Stockton with his wife, Edith. His brother, Brando, is a member of the Stockton City Council and his cousin, Miguel, is a member of the San Joaquin County Board of Supervisors.

== Electoral history ==
=== 2016 ===
2016 Stockton mayoral election
| Candidate | First-round | | Runoff | |
| Candidate | Votes | % | Votes | % |
|---|---|---|---|---|
| Michael Tubbs | 15,847 | 33.42 | 56,165 | 70.57 |
| Anthony Silva (incumbent) | 12,499 | 26.36 | 23,426 | 29.43 |
| Carlos Villapudua | 11,425 | 24.10 | | |
| Tony Mannor | 2,309 | 4.87 | | |
| Jimmie M. Rishwain | 1,905 | 4.02 | | |
| Gary Malloy | 1,889 | 3.98 | | |
| Sean Murray | 1,118 | 2.36 | | |
| Emiliano B. Adams | 319 | 0.67 | | |
| Write-ins | 101 | 0.21 | | |
| Total | 47,412 | 100 | 79,591 | 100 |

=== 2018 ===
2018 California State Assembly election
Primary election
| Party | Candidate | Votes | % |
|---|---|---|---|
| Democratic | Susan Eggman (incumbent) | 30,826 | 52.6 |
| Republican | Antonio M. Garcia | 17,885 | 30.5 |
| Democratic | Carlos Villapudua | 9,888 | 16.9 |
| Total votes | | 58,599 | 100.0 |

=== 2020 ===
2020 California State Assembly election
Primary election
| Party | Candidate | Votes | % |
|---|---|---|---|
| Democratic | Carlos Villapudua | 27,068 | 35.9 |
| Democratic | Kathy Miller | 24,091 | 31.9 |
| Democratic | Christina Fugazi | 24,061 | 31.9 |
| Republican | Khalid Jeffrey Jafri (write in) | 210 | 0.3 |
| Total votes | | 75,430 | 100.0 |
General election
| Democratic | Carlos Villapudua | 83,746 | 51.6 |
| Democratic | Kathy Miller | 78,609 | 48.4 |
| Total votes | | 162,355 | 100.0 |
| Democratic hold | | | |

=== 2022 ===
2022 California State Assembly election
Primary election
| Party | Candidate | Votes | % |
|---|---|---|---|
| Democratic | Carlos Villapudua (incumbent) | 28,099 | 59.1 |
| Democratic | Veronica Vargas | 12,598 | 26.5 |
| Democratic | Mateo Morelos Bedolla | 6,643 | 14.0 |
| Republican | Jessica Wagner (write in) | 222 | 0.5 |
| Total votes | | 47,562 | 100.0 |
General election
| Democratic | Carlos Villapudua (incumbent) | 51,891 | 60.6 |
| Democratic | Veronica Vargas | 33,673 | 39.4 |
| Total votes | | 65,287 | 100.0 |
| Democratic hold | | | |
