= 2008 Stockton, California, mayoral election =

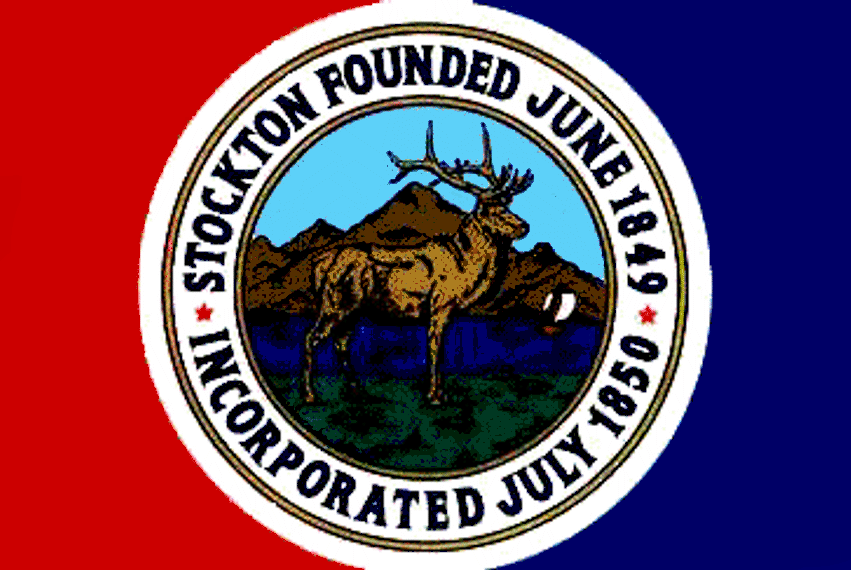
- June 3, 2008 (first round); November 4, 2008 (runoff)

Candidate	Ann Johnston	Clem Lee
Party	Democratic	Nonpartisan
First-round vote	10,981	8,473
First-round percentage	37.77%	29.14%
Second-round vote	42,224	33,144
Second-round percentage	55.84%	43.83%
Candidate	Steve Gutierrez	Ralph Lee White
Party	Nonpartisan	Nonpartisan
First-round vote	5,939	2,495
First-round percentage	20.43%	8.58%
Mayor before election
Edward Chavez
Republican
Elected mayor
Ann Johnston
Democratic

Stockton, California, held an election for mayor on June 3, 2008, and November 4, 2008. It saw the election of Ann Johnston.

== Results ==
=== First round ===
First round results
Candidate	Votes	%
Ann Johnston	10,981	37.77
Clem Lee	8,473	29.14
Steve Gutierrez	5,939	20.43
Ralph Lee White	2,495	8.58
Motecuzoma Sánchez	614	2.11
Woody Roe Alspaugh	512	1.76
Write-in	58	0.20
Total votes	29,072	

=== Runoff ===
Runoff results
Candidate	Votes	%
Ann Johnston	42,224	55.84
Clem Lee	33,144	43.83
Write-in	245	0.32
Total votes	75,613	
