= 2020 Stockton, California, mayoral election =

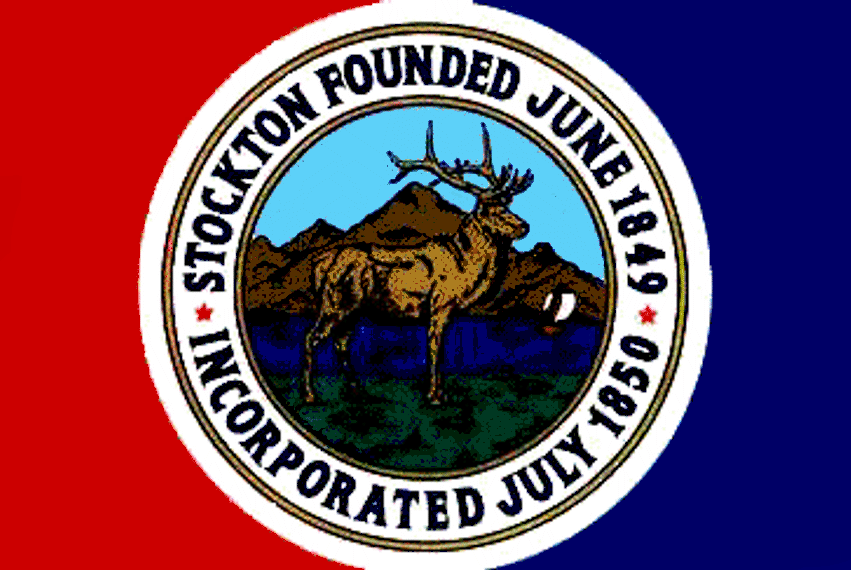
- March 3, 2020 (primary); November 3, 2020 (runoff)
- Turnout: 42.38% (primary); 75.13% (runoff)
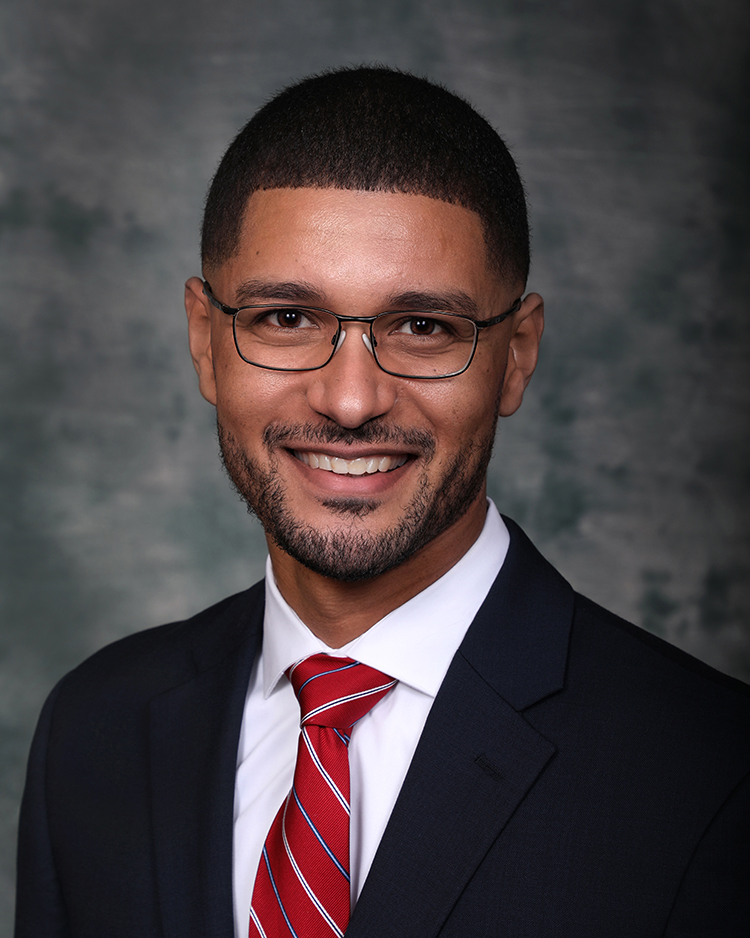

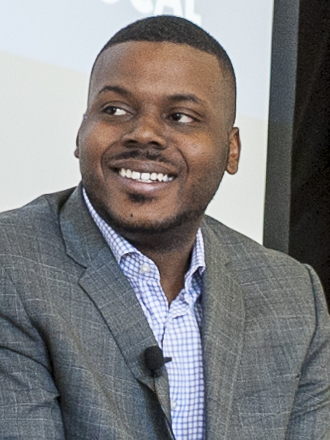

Candidate	Kevin Lincoln	Michael Tubbs	Bill Smith
Popular vote	10,927 (primary); 57,276 (runoff)	21,016 (primary); 44,206 (runoff)	5,679 (primary)
Percentage	20.7% (primary); 56.4% (runoff)	39.9% (primary); 43.6% (runoff)	10.8% (primary)
Candidate	Motec P. Sanchez	Shoua Lo
Popular vote	5,523 (primary)	2,773 (primary)
Percentage	10.5% (primary)	5.3% (primary)
Mayor before election
Michael Tubbs
Elected mayor
Kevin Lincoln

Stockton, California, held an election for mayor on March 3, 2020, with a runoff election held on November 3, 2020. Despite a strong performance in the primary, incumbent Democrat Michael Tubbs was defeated by Republican Kevin Lincoln in the general election.

Municipal elections in California are officially nonpartisan; candidates' party affiliations do not appear on the ballot.

== Candidates ==
=== Declared ===
- Shelly Hollis, business owner and filmmaker
- Andrew Lee Johnson, business owner
- Kevin Lincoln, candidate for State Assembly in 2016 (party preference: Republican)
- Shoua Lo, environmentalist and chemical engineer
- Motec Patrick Sanchez, community advocate and USMC veteran
- Bill Smith, project manager
- Michael Tubbs, incumbent mayor and former city council member (party preference: Democratic)
- Ralph Lee White, former city council member and candidate for mayor in 2012

== Results ==
=== First round ===
2020 Stockton mayoral election
Candidate	Votes	%
Michael Tubbs (incumbent)	21,016	39.90%
Kevin Lincoln	10,927	20.74%
Bill Smith	5,679	10.78%
Motec Patrick Sanchez	5,523	10.49%
Shoua Lo	2,773	5.26%
Ralph Lee White	2,179	4.14%
Shelly Hollis	1,698	3.22%
Andrew Lee Johnson	674	1.28%
Total votes	52,674	100.00%

=== Runoff ===
2020 Stockton mayoral runoff election
Candidate	Votes	%
Kevin Lincoln	57,276	56.44%
Michael Tubbs (incumbent)	44,206	43.56%
Total votes	101,482	100.00%
