= Edward Chavez (politician) =

American politician

Mayor Edward Chavez

76th Mayor of Stockton, California
- In office January 1, 2005 – January 6, 2009
- Preceded by: Gary Podesto
- Succeeded by: Ann Johnston

Personal details
- Born: 1943 (age 82–83) Stockton, California
- Party: Republican
- Children: 2
- Education: St. Mary's High School
- Alma mater: San Joaquin Delta College (AA); California State University, Sacramento (BA); California State Polytechnic University, Pomona (MSc)

Military service
- Allegiance: United States
- Branch/service: United States Air Force
- Years of service: 1962–1970

Edward "Ed" Chavez (born 1943) is a former American politician and law enforcement officer who served as the 76th mayor of Stockton, California from 2005 until 2009. Prior to that, Chavez served as the city's police chief from 1993 to 2005.

== Early life and education ==
Edward Chavez was born in Stockton, California, in 1943 to Pilar and Santiago Chavez. He attended Jackson School in South Stockton, then completed elementary school at St. Agnes School. After graduating from St. Mary's High School in 1961, in February 1962 he enlisted in the United States Air Force, being stationed in Southern California, Texas, and Vietnam. He was discharged in 1970.

Chavez obtained an Associate of Arts from San Joaquin Delta College in 1970, earned a Bachelor of Arts in Criminal Justice from California State University, Sacramento in 1972, and a Master of Science in Management from Cal Poly Pomona in 1992.

== Stockton Police ==
Chavez joined the Stockton Police Department in 1973 as a police officer. Aside from being an officer, he also served as a sergeant, lieutenant, captain, and deputy chief. He became Chief of Police in February 1993.

== Political career ==
Chavez was elected mayor of Stockton in the 2004 election, winning with 52.2% of the vote. He was sworn in on January 1, 2005, succeeding Gary Podesto. As mayor he was a member of the Mayors Against Illegal Guns Coalition. He initially said he would likely run for re-election in 2008, but on December 18, 2007, Chavez announced he would leave at the end of his term, saying it was time for him and his wife, Barbara, to live a private life.

== Personal life ==
Chavez has two children, a son, Eric, and a daughter, Jill. Upon his term as mayor ending, Chavez now resides in Indio, California.

== Electoral history ==
2004 Stockton mayoral election
Candidate	Votes	%
Edward Chavez	20,052	52.2
Ann Johnston	15,037	39.1
Ralph Lee White	2,300	6.0
Harvey N. Bills, Sr.	1,047	2.7
Write-ins	75	0.2
Total votes	38,511	100
