= Ann Johnston (American politician) =

American politician

77th Mayor of Stockton, California
- In office January 6, 2009 – January 8, 2013
- Preceded by: Edward Chavez
- Succeeded by: Anthony Silva

Member of the Stockton City Council
- In office 1995–2002
- Preceded by: Dale Fritchen

Personal details
- Political party: Democratic
- Occupation: Politician

Ann Johnston is an American politician who served as the 77th mayor of Stockton, California from 2009 until 2013. She ran for re-election in 2012 but was defeated by Anthony Silva.

== Political career ==
Johnston served as a Lodi Unified School District Board Member from 1979 to 1992. Several years later, in 1994, Johnston ran for the Stockton City Council and won. She successfully ran for re-election in 1998 and left the office in 2002.

Years later, Johnston declared her candidacy for the city's mayor in the 2008 election, and won, receiving 55.8% of the vote. On June 28, 2012, during her tenure as mayor, the City of Stockton filed for Chapter 9 bankruptcy protection, making it the largest city in U.S. history to file for bankruptcy, until Detroit filed for bankruptcy the next year.

== Electoral history ==
Mayor of Stockton

2004 Stockton mayoral election
Candidate	Votes	%
Edward Chavez	20,052	52.2
Ann Johnston	15,037	39.1
Ralph Lee White	2,300	6.0
Harvey N. Bills, Sr.	1,047	2.7
Write-ins	75	0.2
Total votes	38,511	100

2008 Stockton mayoral election
Candidate	First-round		Runoff	
Candidate	Votes	%	Votes	%
Ann Johnston	7,263	21.42	44,159	59.26
Clem Lee	8,473	29.14	33,144	43.83
Steve Gutierrez	5,939	20.43		
Ralph Lee White	2,495	8.58		
Motecuzoma Sánchez	614	2.11		
Woody Roe Alspaugh	512	1.76		
Write-ins	58	0.20	245	0.32
Total	29,072	100	75,613	100

2012 Stockton mayoral election
Candidate	First-round		Runoff	
Candidate	Votes	%	Votes	%
Anthony Silva	7,263	21.42	44,159	59.26
Ann Johnston (incumbent)	13,830	40.79	30,360	40.74
Jimmie M. Rishwain	5,085	15.00		
Ralph Lee White	3,918	11.55		
Tony Stevens	1,601	4.72		
James "Jim" Butler	1,166	3.44		
Gregory S. Pitsch	904	2.67		
Total	33,908	100	74,519	100
