= 2012 Stockton, California, mayoral election =

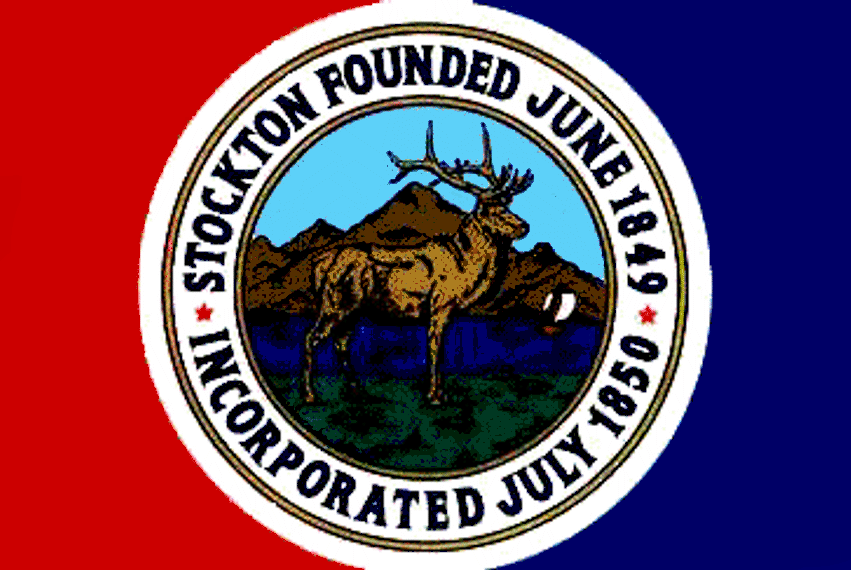
- June 5, 2012 (first round); November 6, 2012 (runoff)

Candidate	Anthony Silva	Ann Johnston
First-round vote	7,263	13,830
First-round percentage	21.42%	40.79%
Second-round vote	44,159	30,360
Second-round percentage	59.26%	40.74%
Candidate	Jimmie M. Rishwain	Ralph Lee White
First-round vote	5,085	3,918
First-round percentage	15.00%	11.55%
Mayor before election
Ann Johnston
Democratic
Elected mayor
Anthony Silva

Stockton, California, held an election for mayor on June 5, 2012 and November 6, 2012. It saw Anthony Silva unseat incumbent mayor Ann Johnston.

Municipal elections in California are officially non-partisan.

== Results ==
=== First round ===
First round results
Candidate	Votes	%
Ann Johnston (incumbent)	13,830	40.79
Anthony Silva	7,263	21.42
Jimmie M. Rishwain	5,085	15.00
Ralph Lee White	3,918	11.55
Tony Stevens	1,601	4.72
James "Jim" Butler	1,166	3.44
Gregory S. Pitsch	904	2.67
Total votes	33,908	

=== Runoff ===
Runoff results
Candidate	Votes	%
Anthony Silva	44,159	59.26
Ann Johnston (incumbent)	30,360	40.74
Total votes	74,519	
