= 2016 Stockton, California, mayoral election =

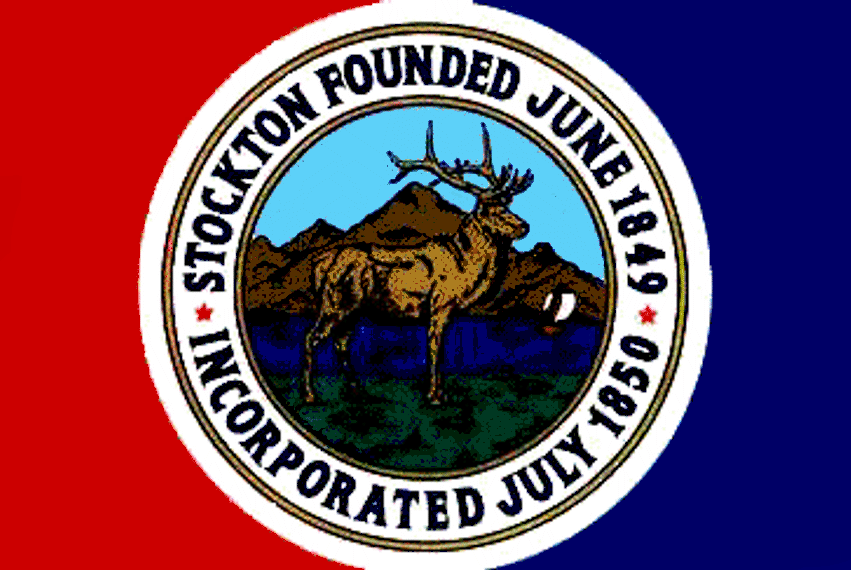
- June 7, 2016 (first round); November 8, 2016 (runoff)
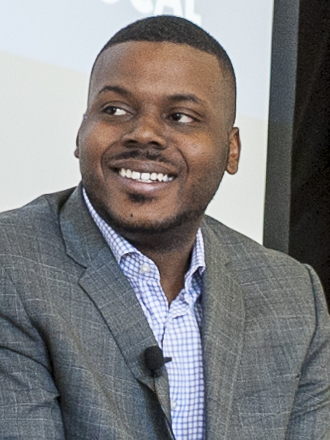

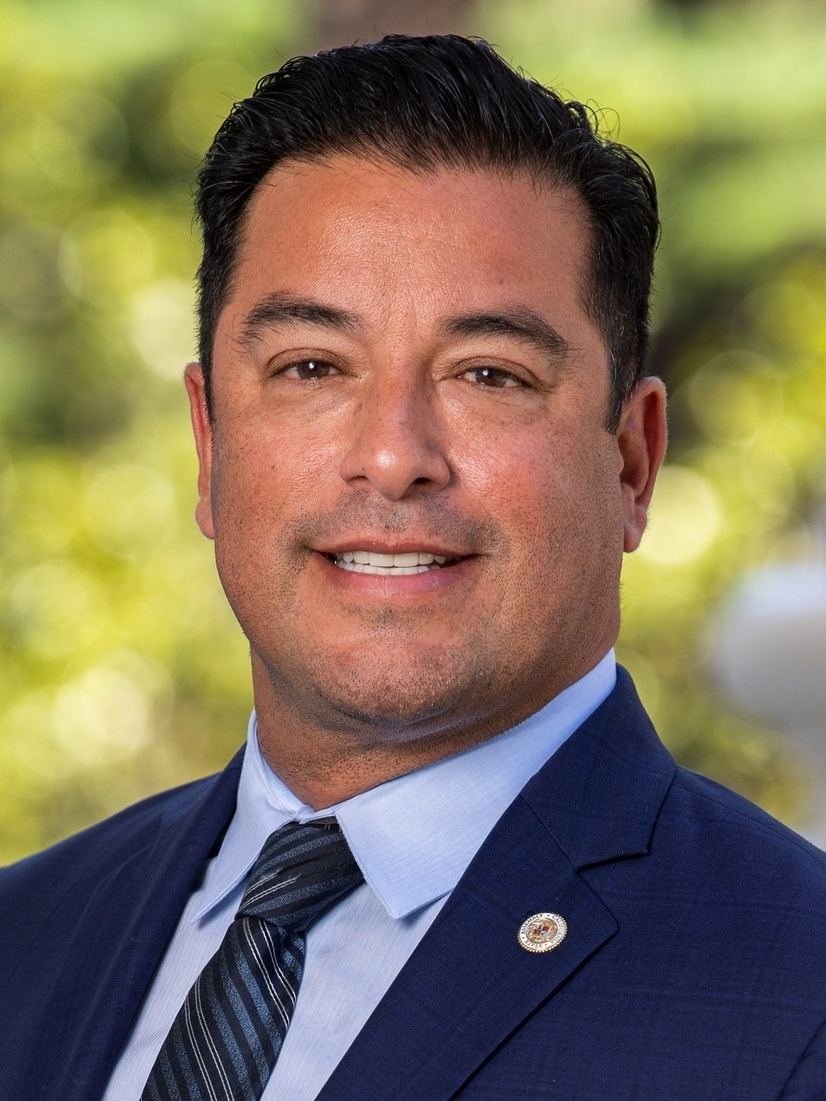
Candidate	Michael Tubbs	Anthony Silva	Carlos Villapudua
First-round vote	15,847	12,499	11,425
First-round percentage	33.42%	26.36%	24.10%
Second-round vote	56,165	23,426
Second-round percentage	70.57%	29.43%
Mayor before election
Anthony Silva
Republican
Elected mayor
Michael Tubbs
Democratic

Stockton, California, held an election for mayor on June 7, 2016 and November 8, 2016. It saw Michael Tubbs unseat incumbent mayor Anthony Silva

Tubbs became the youngest mayor in Stockton's history and its first African American mayor.

Municipal elections in California are officially non-partisan.

== 2016 Election Results ==
=== First round ===
First round results
Candidate	Votes	%
Michael Tubbs	15,847	33.42
Anthony Silva (incumbent)	12,499	26.36
Carlos Villapudua	11,425	24.10
Tony Mannor	2,309	4.87
Jimmie M. Rishwain	1,905	4.02
Gary Malloy	1,889	3.98
Sean Murray	1,118	2.36
Emiliano B. Adams	319	0.67
Write-in	101	0.21
Total votes	47,412	

=== Runoff ===
Runoff results
Candidate	Votes	%
Michael Tubbs	56,165	70.57
Anthony Silva (incumbent)	23,426	29.43
