= Gary Podesto =

American politician (1941–2023)

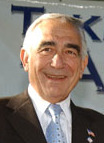

75th Mayor of Stockton, California
- In office January 6, 1997 – January 1, 2005
- Preceded by: Joan Darrah
- Succeeded by: Edward Chavez

Personal details
- Born: Gary Allen Podesto; October 19, 1941 Stockton, California, U.S.
- Died: June 29, 2023 (aged 81) Bozeman, Montana, U.S.
- Party: Republican
- Spouse: Janice (m. 1962)
- Education: Marquette University; Santa Clara University (BS)

Gary Allen Podesto (October 19, 1941 – June 29, 2023) was an American politician and businessman who served as the 75th mayor of Stockton, California from 1997 until 2005.

== Personal life ==
Podesto went to St. Mary's High School in Stockton and graduated in 1959. He went to Marquette University in Milwaukee, Wisconsin later that year but left when the football team was cut. He instead went to Santa Clara University from which he graduated with a degree in economies in 1963. He briefly took evening classes at Humphreys College in 1960s.

In 1962, Podesto married Janice, whom he had met at St. Mary's High School.

Podesto died at his home near Bozeman, Montana, at the age of 81 on June 29, 2023.

== Early career ==
After graduating from Santa Clara University, Podesto managed his father's Don Quick grocery store in Tracy, California. He opened a Food 4 Less grocery store in Stockton in 1984 and went on to open two more, employing about 400 employees and generating up to $120 million in annual retail sales.

== Political career ==
Podesto sold his stores in 1996 and soon after declared his candidacy for mayor, spending what was then a local record of $206,000 on the campaign. He won more than two of every three votes cast and won an uncontested re-election in 2000.

In 2004, when term limits prevented him from running for mayor again, Podesto declared his candidacy for California's 5th State Senate district, seeking to oust State Senator Michael Machado. Podesto spent nearly $5 million on his bid but lost by less than 5 percent. As of 2023, Podesto is the most recent Mayor of Stockton to have been elected to and serve two full terms.

The Gary and Janice Podesto Teen Impact Center in Stockton is named after the former mayor and his wife.

== Electoral history ==
1996 Stockton mayoral election
Candidate	Votes	%
Gary Podesto	23,046	69.6
Mel Panizza	6,961	21.0
Khalid Jafri	326	4.0
Brian Tibbens	1,105	3.3
Total votes	33,104	100

2000 Stockton mayoral election
Candidate	Votes	%
Gary Podesto (incumbent)	37,487	100
Total votes	37,487	100

2004 California State Senate district 5 Republican primary
Party	Candidate	Votes	%
Republican	Gary A. Podesto	49,865	100
Total votes		49,865	100

2004 California State Senate district 5 election
Party	Candidate	Votes	%
Democratic	Michael Machado (incumbent)	154,519	52.19
Republican	Gary A. Podesto	141,539	47.81
Total votes		296,058	100
