= St. Mary's High School (Stockton, California) =

Parochial secondary school in Stockton, California

Saint Mary's High School

Location
- 5648 North El Dorado Street; Stockton, (San Joaquin County), California 95207; United States; 38°0′16″N 121°18′23″W

Information
- Type: Private, Roman Catholic, Co-educational, College-Preparatory
- Motto: Veritas ∙ Caritas ∙ Tenui Nec Dimitam (Truth ∙ Charity ∙ I have taken hold and will not let go.)
- Religious affiliations: Dominican Sisters of San Rafael, Oblates of St. Francis de Sales
- Patron saints: Mary Queen of Angels, St. Francis de Sales
- Established: 1876
- Founder: Rev. William O'Connor, Charles Webber (Stockton Founder)
- School district: Catholic Diocese of Stockton
- Authority: Most Rev. Bishop Cotta
- Oversight: SMHS Board of Directors
- Superintendent: Marian Graham
- CEEB code: 053435
- President: James Brusa
- Principal: Michael Wright
- Staff: 110
- Grades: 9–12
- Student to teacher ratio: 19/1
- Campus size: 25 acres (100,000 m^{2})
- Campus type: Urban
- Colors: Kelly Green and White
- Slogan: "Be who you are and be that well." –St. Francis de Sales
- Sports: Tri-City Athletic League. Division 1–3
- Mascot: Ram
- Team name: Rams
- Accreditation: Western Association of Schools and Colleges
- Publication: Teleram, Traditions Magazine
- Newspaper: The Kettle
- Yearbook: Cauldron
- Endowment: SMHS Foundation
- Tuition: $10,500
- Website: www.saintmaryshighschool.org

Saint Mary's High School (SMHS), founded in 1876, is a Roman Catholic, co-educational, college preparatory school in Stockton, California. The school's address is 5648 N El Dorado Street, Stockton, CA 95207. The school is under the canonical jurisdiction of the Diocese of Stockton and sponsored by the Salesian order of the Oblates of St. Francis de Sales priests and brothers (Toledo–Ohio Province). The school is a member of the College Board and is accredited by the Western Association of Schools and Colleges and by the Western Catholic Education Association.

== History ==
St. Mary's roots go back to 1876 when St. Agnes Academy opened as a boarding and free day school for girls, grades 1–12. The faculty then consisted of seven Dominican Sisters and 95 students. Since then, St. Mary's growth has been reflected in five relocations, culminating in its current 25 acres (100,000 m^{2}) campus on North El Dorado Street. A separate corporation sole within the Diocese of Stockton, St. Mary's is a co-ed secondary school that has a student body of 926 and a faculty and support staff totaling over 110.

St. Mary's High School has had a religious presence of Priests, Brothers, and Sisters throughout its history. The Dominican Sisters of San Rafael have been joined by the Brothers of Mary, a number of Franciscan Friars, diocesan priests, the Sisters of the Blessed Virgin Mary, and the Oblates of St. Francis de Sales.

Lay men and women have contributed to strengthening the school's curriculum. The faculty teach in 10 disciplines, offering over 130 courses in theology, English, social studies, mathematics, physical education, science, computer resources, foreign languages, business and vocational arts, and fine arts. There are also 27 cocurricular activities and teams in 15 sports.

== Campus ==
The school is located on North El Dorado Street, 1 mile (1.6 km) east of San Joaquin Delta College and 2 miles (3.2 km) north of the University of the Pacific.

Located on 25 acres (10 ha) are five classroom buildings, a cafeteria, student store, two gymnasiums, a football field, track facilities, and baseball and soccer fields all located within the Thompson Sports Complex. There is a residence on campus for the priests and brothers associated with the Oblates of St. Francis de Sales (Toledo–Ohio Province). The Cortopassi Aquatics Center, which opened September 2007, is home for the St. Mary's Aquatic Sports Program. The Chase Family Fitness Center, a 14,000 square feet (1,300 m^{2}) weight-training facility, supplements the Sprague Family Athletic Building. In 2017, a bronze statue of St. Francis de Sales seated at the Edmond Zeiter memorial was installed. The Stations of the Cross, a project that began in 2019, was added and completed in 2021.

Approximately 81% of the student body identify themselves as Catholic. The faculty consists of 1 religious Oblate Priest and 110 lay teachers and support staff. Average classroom size being 25.

== Academics ==
There are ten departments at St. Mary's from which students choose their required and elective courses: Theology, English, Social Studies, Mathematics, Physical Education & Health, Science, Computer, Foreign Language, and Fine Arts. In addition, students may take courses for high school and college credit at San Joaquin Delta Community College or University of the Pacific.

Advanced Placement courses are offered in American Literature, English Literature, Chemistry, European History, U.S. History, U.S. Government, Psychology, Calculus and Biology. Honors courses are offered in Algebra, Biology, Chemistry, English, Geometry/Trigonometry, Physical Science, Pre-Calculus and World Literature.

As part of the religious focus of the school, each student is required to participate in a Community Service program upon graduation.

=== Admission ===
Admission to St. Mary's is selective and based on a placement test, previous school record and recommendation. Transfer students are accepted on an individual basis after consideration of their high school transcripts and interviews. St. Mary's draws students from 64 local elementary and junior high schools.

== Co-curricular activities ==
St. Mary's hosts clubs and organizations focusing on creativity, leadership, scholarship, and service. Student athletes compete in the Tri-City Athletic Association in football, volleyball, water polo, lacrosse, soccer, tennis, basketball, wrestling, baseball, softball, cross-country, track, swimming/diving, badminton, and golf.

St. Mary's also has a boys and girls Ice Hockey program. The boys and girls team participate in California Amateur Hockey Association (CAHA), and the boys also compete in the Canadian High School Hockey League (CSSHL).

=== Band ===
Saint Mary's High School features two main bands (jazz and symphonic) who play throughout the area and the state at competitions such as The Lincoln Band Review and The Heritage Festival in Anaheim, California.

== Notable alumni ==
- Popo Aumavae, NFL defensive end for the Carolina Panthers
- Jason Bartlett, 1997 former MLB shortstop. Twins, Padres, Tampa Bay Rays
- Barry Enright, Major League Baseball pitcher
- Chelsea Gray, professional basketball player for WNBA's Los Angeles Sparks and Las Vegas Aces, 2× WNBA champion (2016, 2022)
- Von Hayes, former MLB outfielder, All-Star
- Kyle Jensen, Major League Baseball player
- Ty Kelly, American-Israeli Major League Baseball player
- Jordan Lee, college basketball player
- Doug Martin, running back for NFL's Oakland Raiders
- Pete Morelli, NFL referee, Saint Mary's President
- Mark Payne, professional basketball player
- Gary Podesto, businessman, former Stockton mayor
- Ed Sprague Jr., former MLB third baseman, All-Star, 2× World Series champion (1992, 1993)
- Gabe Vincent, basketball player for NBA's Los Angeles Lakers
- Mitch Walding, MLB third baseman
- Eric Williams, former NFL defensive lineman, Super Bowl XXVI champion
