= Kevin Lincoln (politician) =

American politician (born 1980)

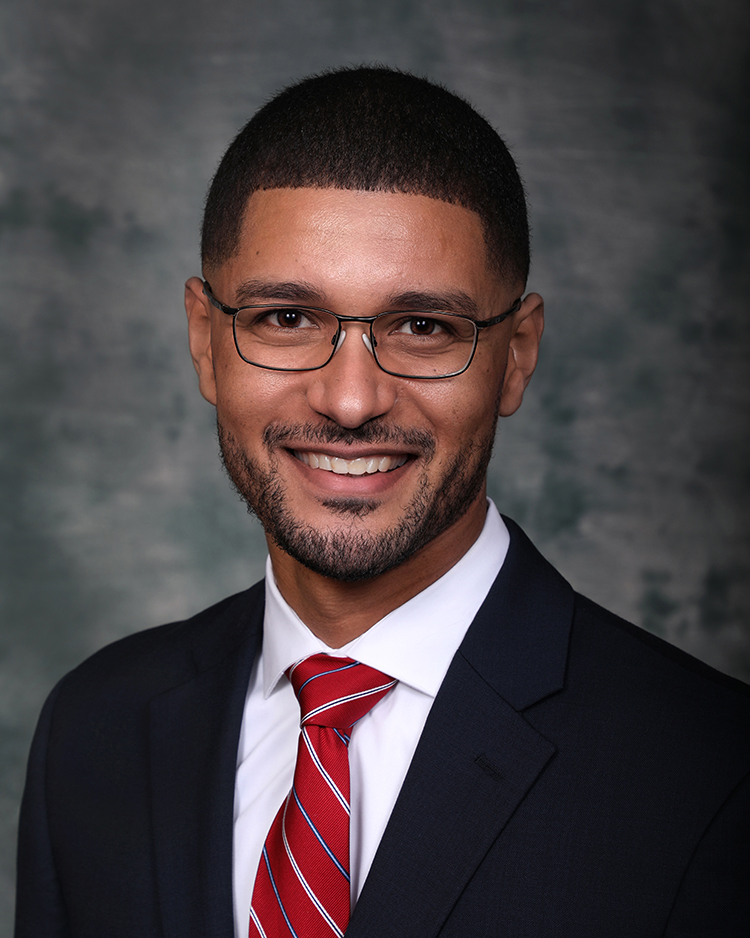
- Official portrait, 2020

80th Mayor of Stockton
- In office January 1, 2021 – January 1, 2025
- Preceded by: Michael Tubbs
- Succeeded by: Christina Fugazi

Personal details
- Born: Kevin Jeffery Lincoln II; October 28, 1980 (age 45) San Joaquin County, California, U.S.
- Party: Republican
- Spouse: Bonnie
- Children: 2
- Education: University of Phoenix (AA); Grand Canyon University (BS); Liberty University (MA)

Military service
- Branch/service: United States Marine Corps

Kevin Jeffery Lincoln II (born October 28, 1980) is an American politician, businessman, and pastor who served as the mayor of Stockton, California, from 2021 to 2025. A member of the Republican Party, Lincoln defeated Democratic incumbent Michael Tubbs in the 2020 election.

Lincoln did not run for a second term as mayor in the 2024 mayoral election, and unsuccessfully ran for California's 9th congressional district against Democratic incumbent Josh Harder. He is currently running in California's newly redrawn 13th congressional district in the 2026 election.

== Education and career ==
Kevin Jeffery Lincoln was born October 28, 1980, in San Joaquin County, and raised in Stockton. His mother was of Mexican descent and his father was African American. In 2001, he joined the U.S. Marine Corps and served on Marine One during the administration of George W. Bush.

He returned to California and worked in Silicon Valley for AlliedBarton from 2005 to 2008, Securitas AB from 2008 to 2009, and AlliedBarton again from 2009 to 2013. He then returned to Stockton and became executive pastor of LifeSong Church.

== Mayor of Stockton ==
In the November 2020 general election, Lincoln defeated Democratic incumbent mayor Michael Tubbs to serve as mayor of Stockton. Municipal elections in California are officially nonpartisan; candidates' party affiliations do not appear on the ballot. Lincoln's party preference, however, is Republican.

According to the Merced County Times, during his tenure as mayor Lincoln "used a bipartisanship approach to solve the city's financial problems." During Lincoln's mayoralty, Stockton saw a reduction in violent crime, including homicides. He oversaw expanded homelessness services and investments in youth and workforce programs. Lincoln "emphasized youth, community organizations, and fiscal responsibility, aiming to position Stockton as a 'best city to live, raise a family, and grow business.'"

He did not run for reelection in 2024, and was succeeded by Christina Fugazi.

== U.S. House elections ==
In July 2023, Lincoln announced his intention to run for California's 9th congressional district. In the November 2024 general election, he lost to incumbent Democrat Josh Harder.

Lincoln is running in the 2026 election for California's 13th congressional district. Lincoln is campaigning on a platform of "pro-growth and pro-housing priorities," advocating "investments in the next generation with a focus on public safety, safe neighborhoods, and good schools."

== See also ==
- African American mayors in California
