= Gary Jacobson =

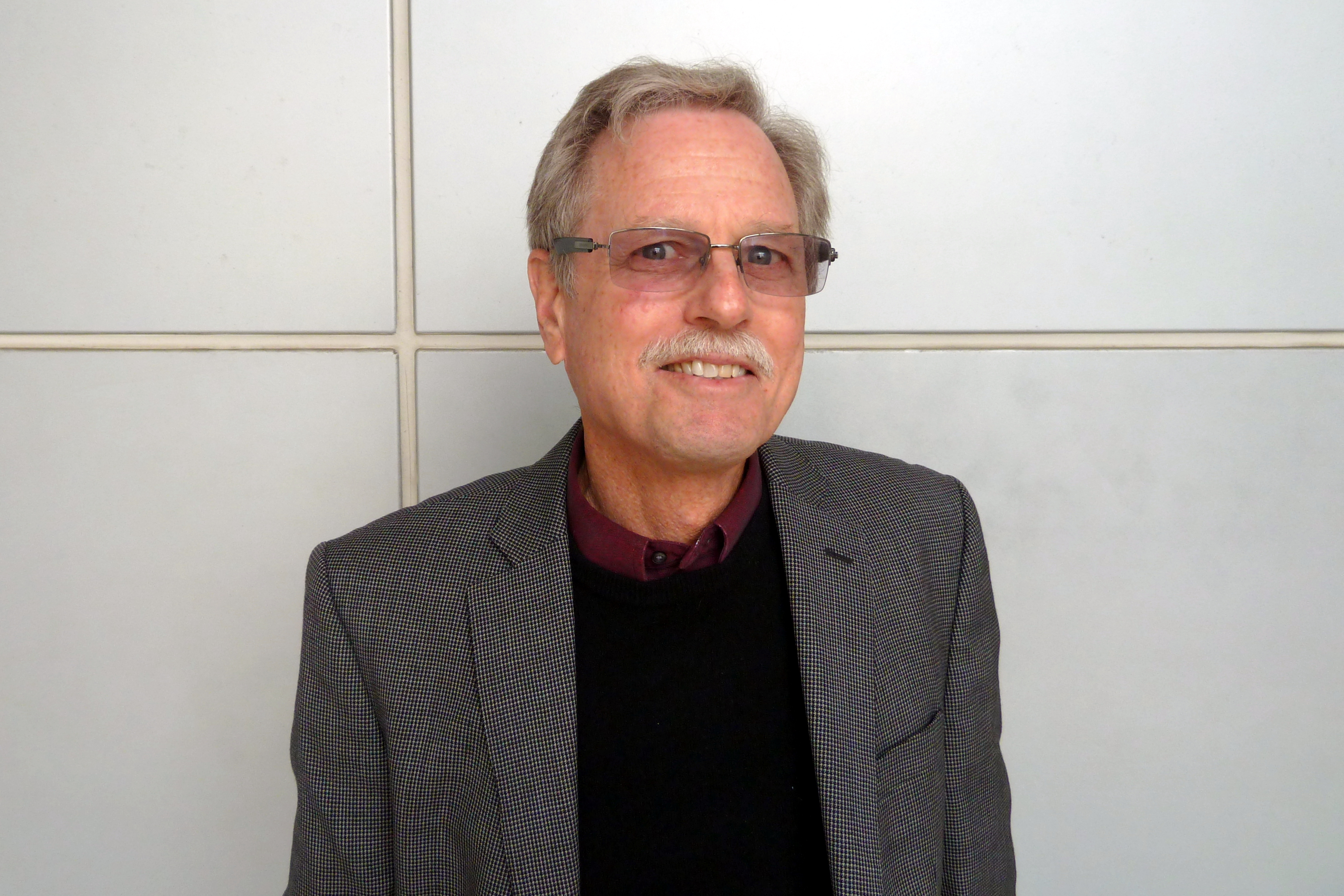
Jacobson in 2014

Gary C. Jacobson (born July 7, 1944) is a professor of political science and the director of undergraduate studies at the University of California, San Diego, where he has been since 1979.

== Biography ==
He was born in Santa Ana and raised in the Los Angeles area, graduating from Culver City High School. He received his A.B. from Stanford University in 1966 and his Ph.D. from Yale University in 1972. From 1970 to 1979 he taught at Trinity College, Hartford, Connecticut. He has also taught at the University of California, Riverside (1968), Yale University (1973) and Stanford University (1986–87). During 1990-91 he was a Fellow at the Center for Advanced Study in the Behavioral Sciences.

He has served on the Board of Overseers of American National Election Studies (1985–93), the Council of the American Political Science Association (APSA) (1993–94), the APSA's Committee on Research Support, and as Treasurer of the APSA (1996–97).

He is recognized as one of the premier scholars in the study of Congressional Campaigns and Election, publishing numerous books and articles on the subject. He is also a frequent commentator for news programs and radio commentary such as NPR.

== Bibliography ==
- Money in Congressional Elections; The Politics of Congressional Elections; The Electoral Origins of Divided Government; A Divider Not a Uniter.
- Strategy and Choice in Congressional Elections; American Parties in Decline; The Logic of American Politics
- The Politics of Congressional Elections
