= 2020 Corpus Christi mayoral election =

- November 3, 2020; December 15, 2020 (runoff)

Candidate	Paulette Guajardo	Joe McComb
Party	Nonpartisan	Nonpartisan
Popular vote	33,366 general 15,809 runoff	34,118 general 12,412 runoff
Percentage	32.24% general 56.02% runoff	32.96% general 43.98% runoff
Candidate	Carolyn Vaughn	Priscilla Gonzalez
Party	Nonpartisan	Nonpartisan
Popular vote	17,198 general	5,427 general
Percentage	16.62% general	5.24% general
Mayor before election
Joe McComb
Republican
Elected mayor
Paulette Guajardo
Democratic

The 2020 Corpus Christi mayoral election was held on November 3, 2020 to elect the mayor of Corpus Christi, Texas. Because the general election did not produce a winner (elections for the mayoralty of Corpus Christi require a majority), a runoff was held on December 15, 2020.

Incumbent one-term mayor Joe McComb was defeated by city councilwoman Paulette Guajardo.

== Candidates ==
=== Declared ===
- Priscilla Gonzalez, marketing supervisor and podcaster
- Paulette Guajardo, city council member
- Joe McComb, incumbent mayor and former city council member (party preference: Republican)
- John Medina, anti-bullying advocate and former operator at Koch Industries
- Joe Michael Perez, shop owner and controversial political figure
- Eric Rodriguez, environmental manager at Naval Air Station Corpus Christi
- Roberto Seidner, retired physician
- Carolyn Vaughn, Nueces County commissioner
- Pancho Villa, retired photographer

== Results ==
=== First round ===
2020 Corpus Christi mayoral election
Party	Candidate	Votes	%
Nonpartisan	Joe McComb (incumbent)	34,118	32.96%
Nonpartisan	Paulette Guajardo	33,366	32.24%
Nonpartisan	Carolyn Vaughn	17,198	16.62%
Nonpartisan	Priscilla Gonzalez	5,427	5.24%
Nonpartisan	Eric Rodriguez	4,330	4.18%
Nonpartisan	Pancho Villa	3,213	3.10%
Nonpartisan	Joe Michael Perez	2,793	2.70%
Nonpartisan	John Medina	2,775	2.68%
Nonpartisan	Roberto Seidner	284	0.27%
Total votes		103,504	100.00%

=== Runoff ===
2020 Corpus Christi mayoral runoff election
Party	Candidate	Votes	%
Nonpartisan	Paulette Guajardo	15,809	56.02%
Nonpartisan	Joe McComb (incumbent)	12,412	43.98%
Total votes		28,221	100.00%

== See also ==
- 2020 Texas elections
