= Anthony Silva (politician) =

American politician (born 1974)

78th Mayor of Stockton, California
- In office January 8, 2013 – January 1, 2017
- Preceded by: Ann Johnston
- Succeeded by: Michael Tubbs

Personal details
- Born: 1974 (age 51–52) Stockton, California, US
- Party: Republican
- Occupation: Former Mayor of the City of Stockton, California

Anthony Silva (born 1974) is an American politician who served as the 78th mayor of Stockton, California from 2013 until 2017.

== Early life ==
Silva was born on November 22, 1974, in Stockton, California, to military veteran Anthony Ray Silva Sr. and registered nurse Diane Cecile Pearce Westcott. His mother was the daughter of June Westcott Fisher, a teacher at Cleveland Elementary, whose great-grandfather Hiram Fisher was among the early settlers of Stockton and founder of Fisher Bros. House Movers. On August 6, 1976, the senior Silva became a fugitive when he escaped the honor farm in French Camp while serving a sentence for burglary. He and Silva's mother divorced, at which point Silva's mother raised him for a time as a single parent. The young mother would eventually remarry; consequently Silva has two half-siblings, Jonathan and Rebecca.

Silva attended the now defunct Village Oaks Elementary and Lincoln High School where he developed a passion for swimming, water polo, and musical choir. Silva describes having had a rough childhood resulting in his running away from home on multiple occasions. Eventually, Silva's repeated truancy landed him in the care of social services briefly, which was an eye-opening experience for the youngster. During his first semester at San Joaquin Delta College, Silva's mother died from bone cancer in October 1993, an event Silva describes as the single most difficult moment of his life. Subsequently, Silva lived with his maternal grandmother for a few years, with whom he was very close. Silva also attended Humphrey's University in Stockton.

At the age of fifteen, Silva began working as a swim coach and lifeguard at the Village Oaks swimming pool. This early experience would eventually see Silva hold various related positions in the community including Health and Safety Director of the American Red Cross, Stockton Parks and Recreation commissioner, and CEO of the former Boys and Girls Club of Stockton. Silva also served on the board of directors for Silver Lake Camp and the Miss San Joaquin County scholarship program as well as working with the county's Human Services Agency as the Aquatics Program Director. Silva cites his personal experience and exposure as a child to other troubled youth in the community as what motivates him to champion programs for at-risk kids.

== Political career ==
Silva was president of the Stockton Unified school board, representing the southeast area from 2004 to 2008 before winning the mayoral candidacy in 2012.

=== Mayor of Stockton ===
Silva was elected mayor in the Stockton's 2012 mayoral election, unseating incumbent mayor Ann Johnston. Throughout his campaign, Silva had advocated for a safer Stockton, suggesting a tax increase that would assist the embattled police department in fighting the city's rising crime. Silva also pledged not to collect a paycheck until the city's budget was balanced and crime had abated. Six months into his term, however, Silva announced that he felt compelled to take the salary after being advised repeatedly by the City Attorney's office that he may still have tax liability on the reportable income. Silva vowed to donate the $18,000 in backpay to local charities such as the Boys and Girls Club, Stockton Shelter for the Homeless, and animal rescue services

On May 15, 2014, Silva slept in a cardboard box outside to draw attention to the problem of homelessness and highlight his initiative to establish an employment resource center for misplaced persons. This proposal was met with support by many within the homeless community.

In December 2015, Silva announced a development plan for Stockton. The plan would build on the city's waterfront and create an airport. The plan also included the establishment of an ordinance prohibiting sagging, a fashion trend.

LGBT groups protested Silva's appointment of Motecuzoma Sanchez to the city planning commission. The person was said to be intolerant of diverse communities, including discriminating based on race and sexuality.

LGBT organizations and atheist groups protested Silva hosting civic meetings in a church that opposed LGBT rights. Silva responded that he was sensitive to the concerns and issued an apology.

Silva ran for re-election in 2016 but lost to Michael Tubbs, who received 70.4 percent of the vote.

=== Legal issues ===
In 2013, the San Joaquin District Attorney's office announced it had concluded an investigation into alleged sexual battery committed by Silva. According to the 2012 allegation, a 19-year old teen formerly employed by the Boys and Girls Club as a lifeguard was performing housework for Silva when he began to pressure her to drink alcoholic beverages in the summer of 2011. The accuser alleged Silva then pulled her across his lap and spanked her buttocks. The chairman of the Boys and Girls Club Guy Hatch defended Silva, saying that the allegation had been investigated by the organization and was determined to be retaliatory in nature due to the young woman being fired. The District Attorney would also later conclude that the witness was not credible.

That same year, an anonymous email containing a 2005 police report would be sent out to hundreds, potentially thousands within the community. The report stemmed from an investigation wherein Silva allegedly bragged about filming underage girls changing in his home via a hidden camera when he was coaching water polo at Franklin High School. The incident was investigated by Stockton Unified Police, with the District Attorney electing not to file charges. As Silva was a Stockton Unified District trustee at the time of the original claim, Silva and his supporters maintained that it and the corresponding email that came on the heels of his mayoral election, were politically motivated and designed with the singular intention to discredit him.

In July 2013, city manager Bob Deis would also call upon the District Attorney to investigate Silva after the mayor allegedly implied that he had secretly recorded a private discussion with Deis at a city council meeting. Recording persons without prior consent is considered a crime.

On December 14, 2014, Silva took a hired limousine to The Mix Sacramento nightclub with a group of several people. During the limo's return trip to Silva's home, a fight broke out among the passengers, all of whom were described by the CHP as being heavily intoxicated. Curtis Mitchell and his fiancée Robin McIntire began an argument that allegedly progressed to Mitchell beating McIntire and destroying the limo's interior. The driver called 911 which resulted in the arrest of Mitchell. Silva was also temporarily placed in handcuffs at which time the driver alleged Silva attempted to leverage his position as mayor, but was ultimately not given any special treatment by the CHP. Silva would later deny any kind of grandstanding on his part. Mitchell was eventually charged with domestic violence and vandalism misdemeanors. Silva did not face any charges.

After the limo incident was made public, both Silva and Mitchell's account of the events differed widely. Silva contended that he was not at all well acquainted with Mitchell prior to that evening, while Mitchell claimed that he and Silva had been "hanging out for several months" leading up to the incident. Silva also painted the picture of being external to the couple's quarrel, but Mitchell alleged that Silva's inappropriate touching of McIntire is what caused [Mitchell] to fly into a rage. Mitchell later expressed some understanding of Silva's actions, indicating that the mayor was very inebriated at the time of the interaction with McIntire, but Silva maintained that while he had participated in the drinking, he had not consumed to the point of intoxication. After Silva issued a statement condemning the domestic violence linked to the incident, Mitchell issued a follow up statement of his own, in which he denied getting physical with his fiancée. Mitchell detailed that her injuries were due to a fall she sustained while exiting the vehicle in her extremely inebriated state. McIntire would corroborate Mitchell's version of events despite the CHP obtaining an emergency protection order immediately following the incident on her behalf. Silva for his part, would eventually acknowledge that he had only seen Mitchell kicking the vehicle following the couple's assertions.

Several months later, driver Ty Reis would file a civil lawsuit against five persons including Silva, indicating that he was never reimbursed for the damages sustained to the limousine. As Mitchell's credit card was initially supplied to reserve the vehicle, Silva had told Reis immediately after the incident to charge it for the damages and also promised to help promote Reis' business. The $12,000 charge was later reversed by Mitchell, who contended along with his lawyer that the amount was exorbitant and that Mitchell did not shoulder all the blame. Silva continued to maintain his innocence, but issued an apology to Stockton citizens for his proximity to the event, indicating that [the citizens] deserved better.

On February 23, 2015, a 13-year-old boy was killed with a gun that was later found to have been registered to Silva. Silva said that the gun was stolen but that he had not yet reported the theft.

On August 4, 2016, Silva was arrested for providing alcohol to underage camp counselors and possessing an audio recording of them playing strip poker at Silver Lake Camp in Amador County in 2015. Silva alleged that all participants were at least 18 years of age and was sentenced to a year of probation and community service after pleading no contest to supplying alcohol to persons under 21. All other charges related to the incident were dropped.

On March 5, 2017, Silva was arrested at San Francisco International Airport. He was charged with grand theft, embezzlement, profiteering, misappropriation of public funds, conflict of interest, and money laundering related to his running of a local non-profit kids' club. In 2019 he pled guilty to one felony conflict of interest charge as part of a plea deal. The conflict of interest charge arose from Silva's transferring of $5,000 from a mayoral discretionary fund to the then Boy's and Girl's Club that he was CEO of in 2013. The felony was later reduced to a misdemeanor, before eventually being expunged from Silva's record.

=== Post-mayoral political involvement ===
On December 18, 2023, Silva announced his return to the political arena after a seven-year hiatus, declaring his intention to run for the City Council District 2.

== Personal life ==
Silva has two sons, the eldest of which enlisted in the U.S. Army upon graduation from high school. On October 13, 2017, Silva announced the birth of his second son.

Following his mayoral defeat and in the wake of multiple scandals, Silva moved to the mountains for a period of time to reflect. Silva also established the family entertainment center Indoor Adventures at the former Naughty Nick's location in Stockton.

== Electoral history ==
2012 Stockton mayoral election
Candidate	First-round		Runoff	
Candidate	Votes	%	Votes	%
Anthony Silva	7,263	21.42	44,159	59.26
Ann Johnston (incumbent)	13,830	40.79	30,360	40.74
Jimmie M. Rishwain	5,085	15.00		
Ralph Lee White	3,918	11.55		
Tony Stevens	1,601	4.72		
James "Jim" Butler	1,166	3.44		
Gregory S. Pitsch	904	2.67		
Total	33,908	100	74,519	100

2016 Stockton mayoral election
Candidate	First-round		Runoff	
Candidate	Votes	%	Votes	%
Michael Tubbs	15,847	33.42	56,165	79.57
Anthony Silva (incumbent)	12,499	26.36	23,426	29.43
Carlos Villapudua	11,425	24.10		
Tony Mannor	2,309	4.87		
Jimmie M. Rishwain	1,905	4.02		
Gary Malloy	1,889	3.98		
Sean Murray	1,118	2.36		
Emiliano B. Adams	319	0.67		
Write-ins	101	0.21		
Total	47,412	100	79,591	100
