= Michael Tubbs =

American politician (born 1990)

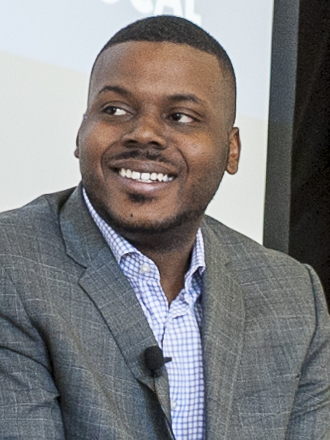

79th Mayor of Stockton
- In office January 1, 2017 – January 1, 2021
- Preceded by: Anthony Silva
- Succeeded by: Kevin Lincoln

Member of the Stockton City Council from the 6th district
- In office January 8, 2013 – January 1, 2017
- Preceded by: Dale Fritchen
- Succeeded by: Jesús Andrade

Personal details
- Born: Michael Derrick Tubbs; August 2, 1990 (age 36) Stockton, California, U.S.
- Party: Democratic
- Spouse: Anna Malaika Tubbs (m. 2017)
- Children: 2
- Education: Stanford University (BA, MA)

Michael Derrick Tubbs (born August 2, 1990) is an American politician who is currently serving as a special adviser for economic mobility and opportunity for Governor Gavin Newsom. A member of the Democratic Party, he previously served as the 79th mayor of Stockton, California, from 2017 to 2021, and as a member of the Stockton City Council from the 6th District from 2013 until 2017.

Tubbs was elected mayor in 2016, becoming the youngest mayor in Stockton's history and its first African-American mayor. With his win, he also became the youngest mayor ever of a city with a population greater than 100,000. In 2020, he lost reelection to Kevin Lincoln. After leaving office, he was appointed by Governor Gavin Newsom to serve as special advisor for economic mobility and opportunity. He was a candidate for Lieutenant Governor of California in the 2026 election.

== Early life ==
Tubbs was born in south Stockton and grew up in poverty. His mother, Racole Dixon, was a teenager at the time of his birth, and his father, also named Michael Tubbs, is serving a third-strike life sentence in prison for kidnapping, drug possession, and robbery. Tubbs has a younger brother named Drevonte.

== Education ==
Tubbs attended Hamilton Middle School. In 2007, while a student at Franklin High School, he won an essay contest sponsored by Alice Walker. His essay about overcoming the mistakes his parents made was published in the San Francisco Chronicle. He criticized his father's "scapegoat mentality" and praised his mother for overcoming adversity.

Tubbs graduated with an International Baccalaureate from Franklin High School in 2008. That July, he was a member of a team of three San Joaquin County teenagers who won a national debate competition in Cincinnati sponsored by the NAACP. They advocated for universal health care, and the debate was followed by a speech by presidential candidate Barack Obama.

He then attended Stanford University on a need-based scholarship, graduating in 2012 with a Bachelor of Arts in Comparative Studies in Race and Ethnicity and a Master of Arts in Policy, Leadership and Organization Studies. As an undergraduate, he received a Truman Scholarship, and was the joint winner of the university's Lloyd W. Dinkelspiel award for "distinctive and exceptional contributions to . . . the quality of student life." During his time at Stanford, he also served as President of the school's NAACP chapter, and interned at the White House. As a low-income college student, Tubbs was the first in his family to attend college and is a first-generation college student.

== Political career ==
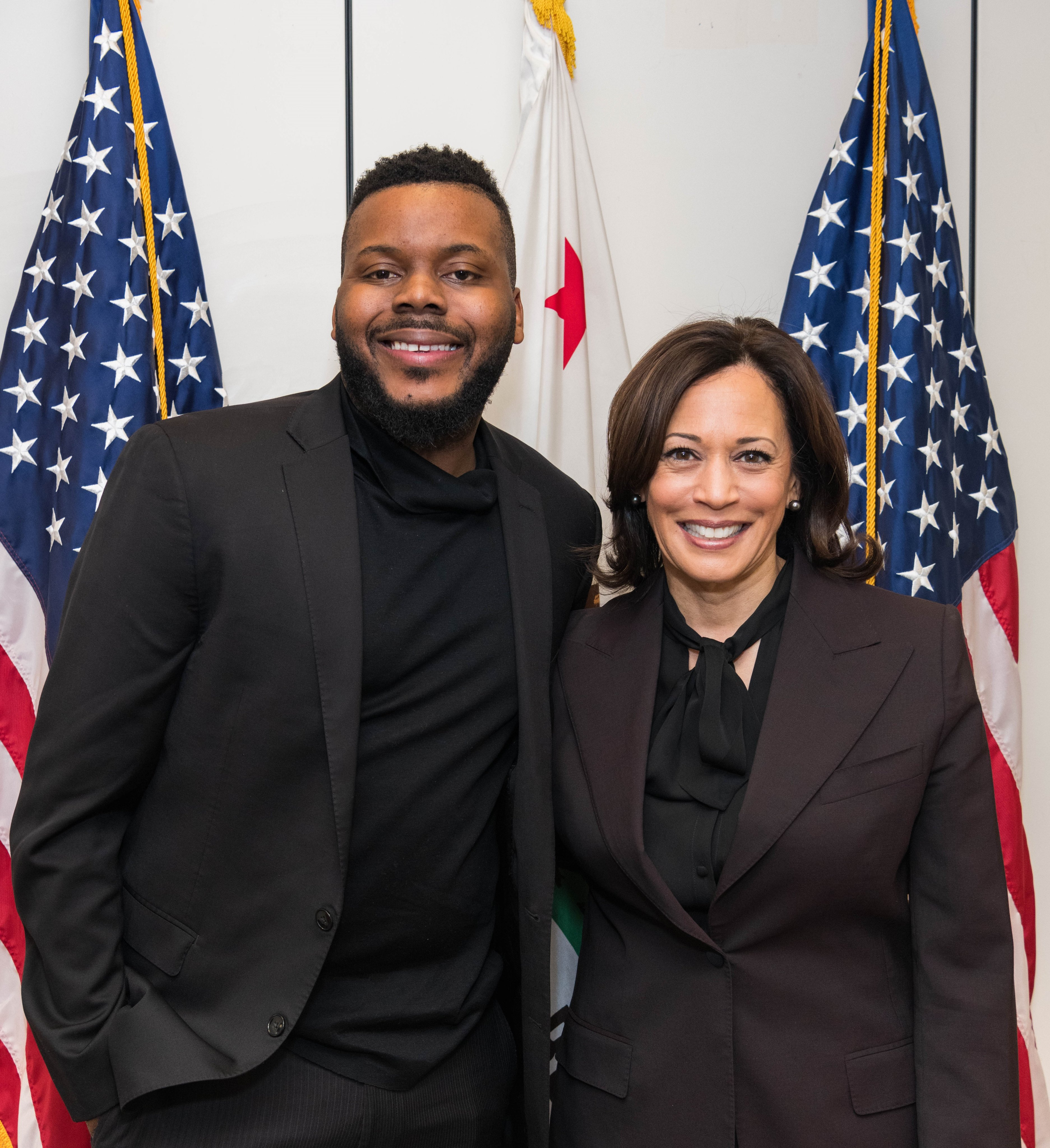
Tubbs with then-Senator Kamala Harris in 2020

Tubbs ran against incumbent Dale Fritchen for Stockton Council District 6 in the November 6, 2012 general election. He won the primary and received a $10,000 campaign donation from Oprah Winfrey after meeting her while she toured the Stanford campus.

Tubbs went on to win the election, receiving 61.7% of the vote, and took office in January 2013 at the age of 22, making him the youngest council member in Stockton history and one of the youngest elected officials in the United States. His candidacy was also the subject of a documentary, True Son, which premiered at the 2014 Tribeca Film Festival.

=== Mayor of Stockton ===
Tubbs announced his candidacy for mayor of Stockton on September 2, 2015, running against incumbent Mayor Anthony Silva in the 2016 general election. He was endorsed by President Barack Obama on November 2, 2016, less than a week before the election. He went on to win the election, receiving 70.6% of the vote and becoming both the city's first black mayor and at 26 the youngest person to hold that office. His term in office began on January 1, 2017.

Tubbs is a proponent of a universal basic income (UBI). As part of the privately funded Stockton Economic Empowerment Demonstration (SEED) pilot project, the city provided a $500 monthly stipend to 125 selected residents for an 18-month period with no strings attached beginning in February 2019. The project was sponsored by the Economic Security Project, an advocacy group chaired by Facebook co-founder Chris Hughes, which provided the first $1 million for the program, and a dozen other Silicon Valley organizations and private donors who funded the rest of its $3 million budget. Tubbs helped assemble a national coalition of mayors who support UBI, Mayors for a Guaranteed Income, which had more than 60 participating cities by 2022.

During his term, Tubbs also established an intervention program to reduce gun violence, programs to reduce homelessness, and mentorships for at-risk students.

In December 2019, Tubbs endorsed Michael Bloomberg's campaign in the 2020 Democratic presidential primary.

Tubbs ran for re-election to a second term as mayor in 2020, losing to Republican Kevin Lincoln. In the first round of mayoral voting, held in June 2020, Tubbs came in first in a field of eight candidates, with 41.5% of the vote (with Lincoln coming in with 22%). In the runoff election, held on November 3, 2020, Tubbs lost to Lincoln 57% to 43%. During the campaign, a social media page known as The 209 Times published numerous stories — many unfounded — accusing Tubbs of corruption. (The 209 Times is run by Motec Patrick Sanchez, who came in fourth in the June primary election, with 10.5% of the vote.) Some attributed Tubbs's loss to the influence of The 209 Times stories, however, Tubbs was also opposed by police and firefighters' unions.

During his reelection campaign, Tubbs was featured in an HBO documentary, Stockton on My Mind.

=== Post-mayoral political involvement ===
On March 11, 2021, he was appointed by California Governor Gavin Newsom as a special adviser for economic mobility and opportunity. In June 2021, 11 U.S. mayors announced they had formed a coalition, called Mayors Organized for Reparations and Equity, to enact reparations programs in their cities; Tubbs was named an emeritus member. In 2022, Tubbs founded a nonprofit organization to address wealth inequities — End Poverty in California (EPIC). As part of his nonprofit work and his duties to the Governor, Tubbs toured California to interview people who are living in poverty. Tubbs has continued to lead Mayors for Guaranteed Income and its expanded organization Counties for Guaranteed Income.

In 2024, Tubbs was a fellow at the USC Center for the Political Future.

=== 2026 lieutenant gubernatorial election ===
In July 2024, Tubbs announced his intent to run for Lieutenant Governor of California in 2026. Tubbs received endorsements from former U.S. Senator Laphonza Butler and current U.S. Representatives Sam Liccardo and Lateefah Simon. He ultimately secured 12% of the vote and finished fourth, failing to advance to the general election.

== Personal life ==
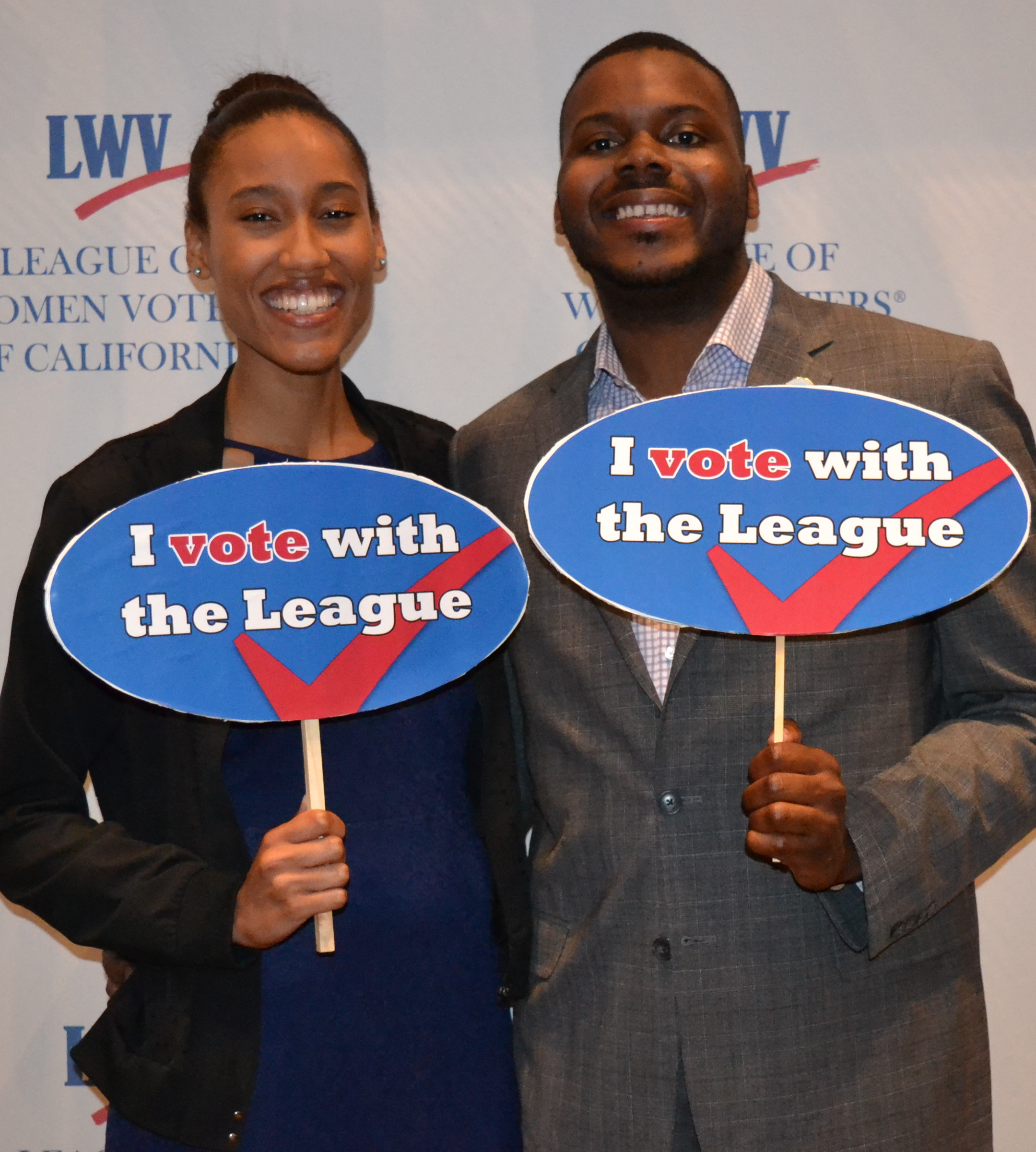
Tubbs and his wife Anna at a League of Women Voters event

In December 2017, Tubbs married Anna Malika Nti-Asare, whom he had met at Stanford University. After graduating from Stanford with a Bachelor of Arts in medical anthropology in 2014 as a member of Phi Beta Kappa and from King's College, Cambridge with a Master of Philosophy in multidisciplinary gender studies in 2015, Nti-Asare spent two years teaching at Aspire Langston Hughes Academy in Stockton. She is now a Gates Cambridge Scholar and a doctoral student in education at King's College, Cambridge.

Tubbs was arrested for driving under the influence in 2014. He apologized for what he called a "poor decision to drive when I should not have." He pled no contest to misdemeanor charges.

On October 19, 2019, he announced the birth of a son. Their second child, a daughter, was born on August 30, 2021.

In 2022, Tubbs published his memoir, The Deeper the Roots: A Memoir of Hope and Home. Tubbs provides featured commentary in the documentary It's Basic, directed by Marc Levin, which premiered at the 2023 Tribeca Festival.

== See also ==
- List of first African-American mayors
- African American mayors in California

== Electoral history ==
2012 Stockton Council district 6 election
Candidate	Primary election		General election	
Candidate	Votes	%	Votes	%
Michael Tubbs	1,932	56.02	43,092	61.82
Dale Fritchen (incumbent)	1,501	43.52	26,617	38.18
Total	3,449	100	69,709	100

2016 Stockton mayoral election
Candidate	First-round		Runoff	
Candidate	Votes	%	Votes	%
Michael Tubbs	15,847	33.42	56,165	70.57
Anthony Silva (incumbent)	12,499	26.36	23,426	29.43
Carlos Villapudua	11,425	24.10		
Tony Mannor	2,309	4.87		
Jimmie M. Rishwain	1,905	4.02		
Gary Malloy	1,889	3.98		
Sean Murray	1,118	2.36		
Emiliano B. Adams	319	0.67		
Write-ins	101	0.21		
Total	47,412	100	79,591	100

2020 Stockton mayoral election
Candidate	First-round		Runoff	
Candidate	Votes	%	Votes	%
Kevin J. Lincoln II	10,927	21.59	57,276	56.44
Michael Tubbs (incumbent)	21,016	41.53	44,206	43.56
Bill Smith	5,679	11.22		
Motec Patrick Sanchez	5,523	10.91		
Shoua Lo	2,773	5.48		
Ralph Lee White	2,179	4.31		
Shelly Hollins	1,698	3.36		
Andrew Lee Johnson	674	1.33		
Uncertified write-ins	136	0.27		
Total	50,605	100	101,482	100
Voter turnout	42.38%		75.13%	

2026 California lieutenant gubernatorial election
Party	Candidate	Votes	%
Democratic	Fiona Ma	1,631,935	19.12
Republican	Gloria Romero	1,521,181	17.83
Democratic	Josh Fryday	1,256,824	14.73
Democratic	Michael Tubbs	1,132,160	13.27
Democratic	Oliver Ma	621,147	7.28
Republican	David Collenberg	594,336	6.96
Republican	David Fennell	521,455	6.11
Republican	Skip Shelton	345,324	4.05
Democratic	Janelle Kellman	311,237	3.65
Republican	Ebie Lynch	156,714	1.84
Democratic	Tim Myers	132,564	1.55
Peace and Freedom	Alice Stek	125,100	1.47
Democratic	Jeyson Lopez	94,058	1.10
Democratic	Abdur Rahman Sikder	51,620	0.60
No party preference	Sean Collinson	24,927	0.29
No party preference	Rakesh Christian	12,870	0.15
Republican	James P. Cameron (write-in)	45	0.00
Democratic	Mushtaq MT Tahirkheli (write-in)	7	0.00
Total votes		8,533,504	100.0

Political offices
Preceded by Anthony Silva	Mayor of Stockton; 2017–2021	Succeeded by Kevin Lincoln
