= Mayor of Stockton, California =

Public office in the United States

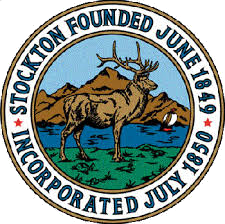
- Seal of City of Stockton

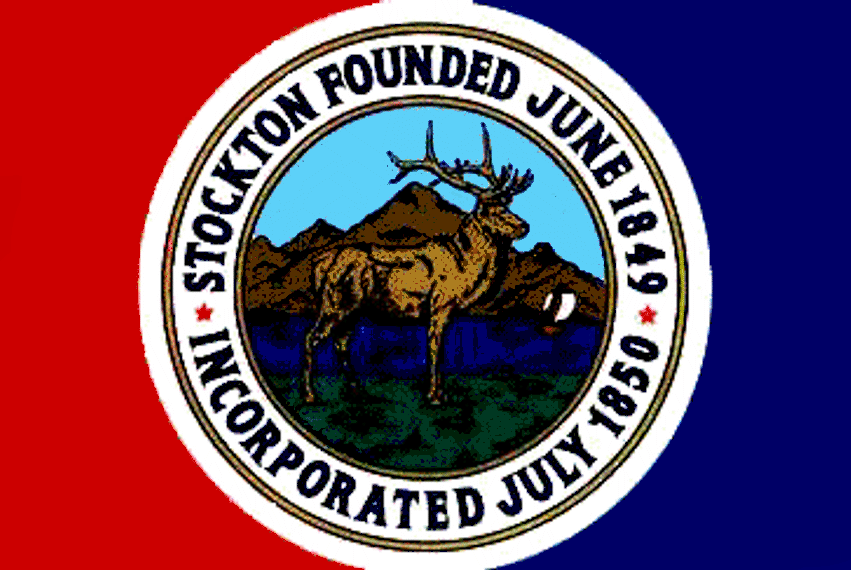
- Flag of City of Stockton

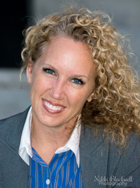
- Incumbent; Christina Fugazi since January 1, 2025
- Term length: Four years (renewable once)
- Inaugural holder: Samuel Purdy
- Formation: 1850
- Salary: $90,480
- Website: City of Stockton

The Mayor of the City of Stockton is the official head and chief executive officer of Stockton, California. The mayor is elected for a four-year term and limited to serving no more than two terms. Under the California Constitution, all judicial, school, county, and city offices, including those of chartered cities, are nonpartisan. Christina Fugazi is the city's 81st and current mayor, having assumed office on January 1, 2025.

== List of mayors ==
As of 2025, 81 individuals have served as Stockton's mayor since its incorporation as a city in California. Ten mayors have served non consecutive terms, the first being E.S. Holden and the most recent being Arnold Rue. The mayor is chosen every four years in a municipal vote. Prior to 1992, the mayor was selected from the City Council.

#	Mayor	Term start	Term end	Party	Notes
1	Samuel Purdy	October 5, 1850	1851	Democratic	
2	John C. Edwards	1851	1852	Democratic	
3	William Baker	1852	January 1853		
4	Jacob K. Shafer	January 1853	May 1853	Democratic	
5	M.B. Kenney	May 1853	1854		
6	J.M. Buffington	1854	1855		
7	Alvin N. Fisher	1855	1856		
8	H.W. Gillingham	1856	1857		
9	B.W. Bours	1857	1859		
10	E.S. Holden	1859	1863		
11	George Gray	1863	1866		
12	C.T. Meader	1866	1867		
13	L.M. Hickman	1867	1868		
14	R.B. Lane	1868	1869		
(13)	L.M. Hickman (2nd)	1869	1870		
15	G.S. Evans	1870	1871		
(10)	E.S Holden	1871	1872		2nd term.
16	Thomas Hook	1872	1873		
17	J.K. Doak	1873	1875		
18	Frank T. Baldwin	1875	1876		
19	T.B. Buck	1876	1878		
20	Charles Belding	1878	1879		
21	G.C. Hyatt	1879	1881		
22	H.O. Southworth	1881	1882		
23	R.W. Tully	1882	1884		
24	W.C. White	1884	1885		
25	J.M. Welsh	1885	1888		
26	L.U. Shippee	1888	1889		
27	R.R. Reibenstein	1889	1891		
28	W.R. Clark	1891	1895		
29	J.M. McCall	1895	1895		
30	H.N. Boggs	1895	1897		
31	William Inglis	1897	1899		
32	W.B. Harrison	1899	1901		
33	George E. Catts	1901	1903		
34	C.E. Williams	1903	1905		
35	M.J. Gardner	1905	1907		
36	George F. Hudson	1907	1909		
(27)	R.R. Reibenstein	1909	1916		2nd term.
37	A.C. Oullahan	1916	1921		
38	Dana P. Eicke	1921	1923		
39	Raymond O. Wheeler	1923	1928		
40	Grover A. Grider	1928	1930		
41	Carl Tremain	1930	1932		
42	Con J. Franke	1932	1935		
43	M.F. Richards	1935	1936		
44	Ralph W. Fay	1936	1939		
45	Gay E. Crane	1939	1940		
46	Woodrow Coale	1940	1941		
47	Lawrence L. Ventre	1941	1942		
48	R.O. Robinson	1942	1943		
49	Lewis A. Lodde	1943	1944		
(44)	Ralph W. Fay	1944	1945		2nd term.
(45)	Gay E. Crane	1945	1946		2nd term.
(46)	Woodrow Coale	1947	1948		2nd term.
50	Jerry Keithley	1948	1948		
(47)	Lawrence L. Ventre	1948	December 1948		2nd term.
51	Angelo Sanguinetti	December 1948	1949		
52	Dan W. Morrison	1950	1951		
53	Woodrow W. LaTeer	1951	1952		
(47)	Lawrence L. Ventre	1952	1953		3rd term.
54	Carl R. Evanhoe	1953	1954		
55	Harvey M. Stull	1954	1955		
56	Dean C. DeCarli	1955	1956		
57	F.L. Bitterman	1956	1958		
(55)	Harvey M. Stull	1958	1959		2nd term.
(56)	Dean C. DeCarli	1959	1959		2nd term.
58	Thomas E. Marnoch	1960	1962		
59	Elmer R. Boss	1962	1964		
60	Roger M. Huckins	1964	1965		
61	Jimmie M. Rishwain	1965	1967		
62	Albert Fedler	1967	1968		
63	Joseph Doll	1968	1969		
64	Arnold Rue	1969	1970		
65	Luis Arismendi	1970	1971		
(64)	Arnold Rue	1971	1972		2nd term.
66	Charles E. Bott	1972	1973		
67	Clyde Davis	1973	1974		
68	Manuel Silveria	1974	1975		
69	Louis "Tom" Madden	1975	1977		
(64)	Arnold Rue	1977	1978		3rd term.
70	Daniel A. O'Brien	1979	1981		
(64)	Arnold Rue	1981	1983		4th term.
71	Randall Ronk	1983	1985		
72	R. James Parkinson	1985	1985		
73	Barbara Fass	1985	February 1990		First female mayor.
74	Joan Darrah	February 1990	January 6, 1997	Democratic	
75	Gary Podesto	January 6, 1997	January 1, 2005	Republican	2nd term.
76	Edward Chavez	January 1, 2005	January 6, 2009	Republican	
77	Ann Johnston	January 6, 2009	January 8, 2013	Democratic	
78	Anthony Silva	January 8, 2013	January 1, 2017	Republican	
79	Michael Tubbs	January 1, 2017	January 1, 2021	Democratic	First African-American mayor
80	Kevin Lincoln	January 1, 2021	January 1, 2025	Republican	
81	Christina Fugazi	January 1, 2025	Incumbent	Democratic	
