= 2024 California State Senate election =

- November 5, 2024

20 seats from odd-numbered districts in the California State Senate 21 seats needed for a majority
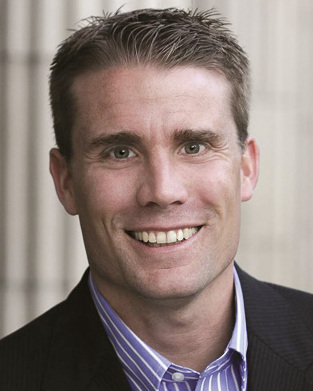

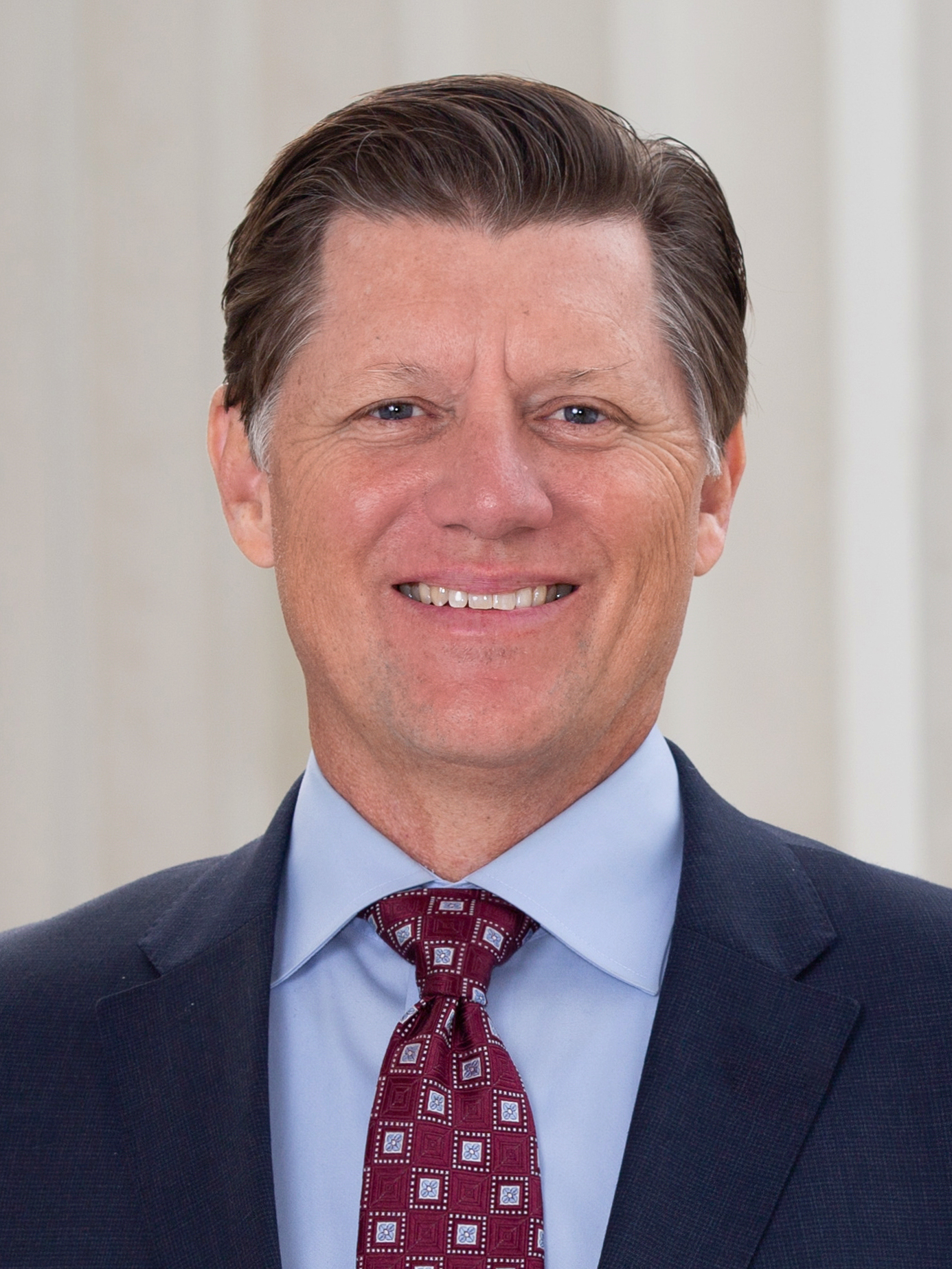
	Majority party	Minority party
Leader	Mike McGuire	Brian Jones
Party	Democratic	Republican
Leader since	February 5, 2024	December 5, 2022
Leader's seat	2nd–Geyserville	40th–Santee
Last election	32	8
Seats before	31	9
Seats won	16	4
Seats after	30	10
Seat change	▼1	▲1
Popular vote	4,638,045	2,808,543
Percentage	62.28%	37.72%
- Republican gain Democratic hold Republican hold No election held Democratic: 50–60% 60–70% 70–80% Republican: 50–60% 70–80%
President pro tempore before election
Mike McGuire
Democratic
Elected President pro tempore
Mike McGuire
Democratic

The 2024 California State Senate election took place on Tuesday, November 5, 2024, with the primary election being held on March 5, 2024. Voters in the 20 odd-numbered districts of the California State Senate will elect their representatives. The elections coincided with the elections for other offices, including the state assembly.

There were 16 Democratic-held senate seats up for election in 2024, three Republican-held seats, and one open seat with no incumbent. Two Democratic incumbents, Dave Min and Josh Newman, were drawn into the same district during redistricting. In August 2024, Republicans gained one seat due to senator Marie Alvarado-Gil switching parties, increasing the size of their caucus to nine.

Republicans flipped one seat in the general election, doing so for the first time in a presidential election year since 1980. (Note: While the Republican caucus has ten members following this election, senator Janet Nguyen vacated her seat after being elected to the Orange County Board of Supervisors.)

== Outgoing incumbents ==
=== Democrats ===
1. 3rd: Bill Dodd was term-limited.
2. 5th: Susan Eggman was term-limited.
3. 7th: Nancy Skinner was term-limited.
4. 9th: Steve Glazer retired.
5. 25th: Anthony Portantino was term-limited and ran for U.S. House.
6. 31st: Richard Roth was term-limited.
7. 35th: Steven Bradford was term-limited.
8. 37th: Dave Min retired to run for U.S. House.
9. 39th: Toni Atkins was term-limited.

=== Republicans ===
1. 1st: Brian Dahle was term-limited.
2. 21st: Scott Wilk was term-limited.

== Predictions ==
Source	Ranking	As of
Sabato's Crystal Ball	Safe D	October 23, 2024

== Summary by district ==
† - Incumbent not seeking re-election

District	Incumbent	Party	Elected senator	Party
1st	Brian Dahle†	Rep	Megan Dahle	Rep
3rd	Bill Dodd†	Dem	Christopher Cabaldon	Dem
5th	Susan Eggman†	Dem	Jerry McNerney	Dem
7th	Nancy Skinner† (Note: Redistricted from the 9th district.)	Dem	Jesse Arreguín	Dem
9th	Steve Glazer† (Note: Redistricted from the 7th district.)	Dem	Tim Grayson	Dem
11th	Scott Wiener	Dem	Scott Wiener	Dem
13th	Josh Becker	Dem	Josh Becker	Dem
15th	Dave Cortese	Dem	Dave Cortese	Dem
17th	John Laird	Dem	John Laird	Dem
19th	Rosilicie Ochoa Bogh (Note: Redistricted from the 23rd district.)	Rep	Rosilicie Ochoa Bogh	Rep
21st	Monique Limón (Note: Redistricted from the 19th district.)	Dem	Monique Limón	Dem
23rd	Scott Wilk† (Note: Redistricted from the 21st district.)	Rep	Suzette Martinez Valladares	Rep
25th	Anthony Portantino†	Dem	Sasha Renée Pérez	Dem
27th	Henry Stern	Dem	Henry Stern	Dem
29th	New Seat		Eloise Reyes	Dem
31st	Richard Roth†	Dem	Sabrina Cervantes	Dem
33rd	Lena Gonzalez	Dem	Lena Gonzalez	Dem
35th	Steven Bradford†	Dem	Laura Richardson	Dem
37th	Josh Newman (Note: Redistricted from the 29th district.)	Dem	Steven Choi	Rep
37th	Dave Min†	Dem	Steven Choi	Rep
39th	Toni Atkins†	Dem	Akilah Weber	Dem

== District 1 ==
2024 California's 1st State Senate district election
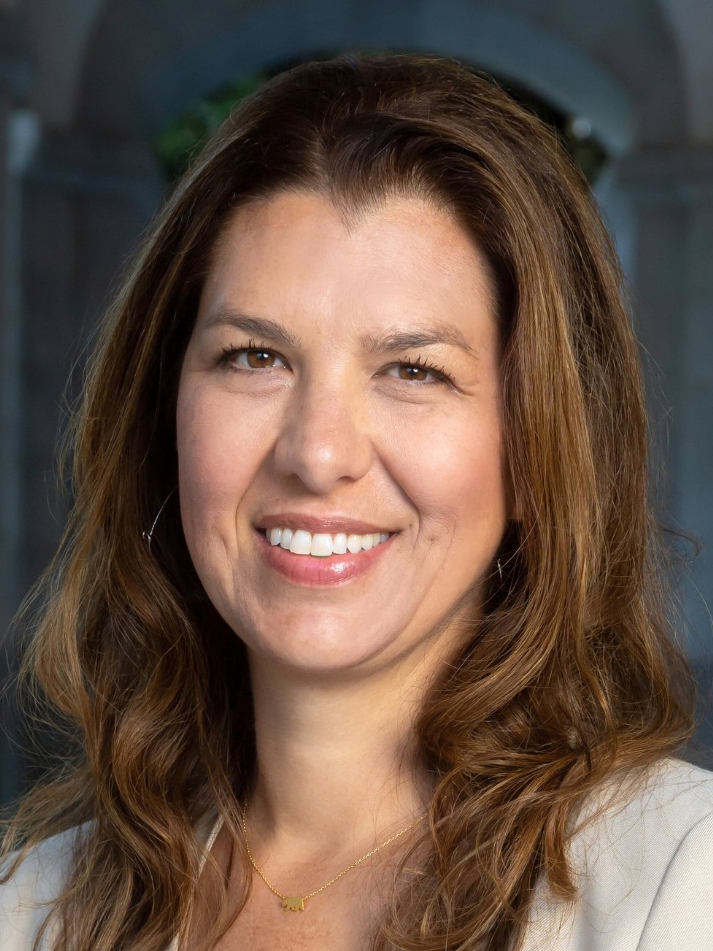

Candidate	Megan Dahle	David Fennell
Party	Republican	Republican
Popular vote	274,894	88,317
Percentage	75.7%	24.3%
State senator before election
Brian Dahle
Republican
Elected State senator
Megan Dahle
Republican

The 1st district encompassed most of the Redwood Forest region and northwestern Sierra Nevada to include Siskiyou, Modoc, Lassen, Shasta, Tehama, Plumas, Glenn, Colusa, Butte, Sutter, Yuba, Nevada, and Sierra counties, along with eastern Placer County. The incumbent was Republican Brian Dahle of Bieber, who was term-limited in 2024.

=== Candidates ===
- Megan Dahle (Republican), state assemblywoman for the 1st district (2019–2024) and wife of incumbent Brian Dahle
- David Fennell (Republican), venture capitalist and candidate for lieutenant governor of California in 2014, 2018, and 2022

=== Endorsements ===
David Fennell (R)

Political parties

- American Independent Party

=== Fundraising ===
Campaign finance reports as of October 19, 2024
Candidate	Raised	Spent	Cash on hand
Megan Dahle (R)	$218,279	$226,478	$184,328
David Fennell (R) (Note: Has not filed any campaign finance reports.)	–	–	–
Source: Secretary of State of California

=== Results ===
2024 California's 1st State Senate district election
Primary election
Party	Candidate	Votes	%
Republican	Megan Dahle	154,305	77.2
Republican	David Fennell	45,686	22.8
Total votes		199,991	100.0
General election
Republican	Megan Dahle	274,894	75.7
Republican	David Fennell	88,317	24.3
Total votes		363,211	100.0
Republican hold			

== District 3 ==
2024 California's 3rd State Senate district election
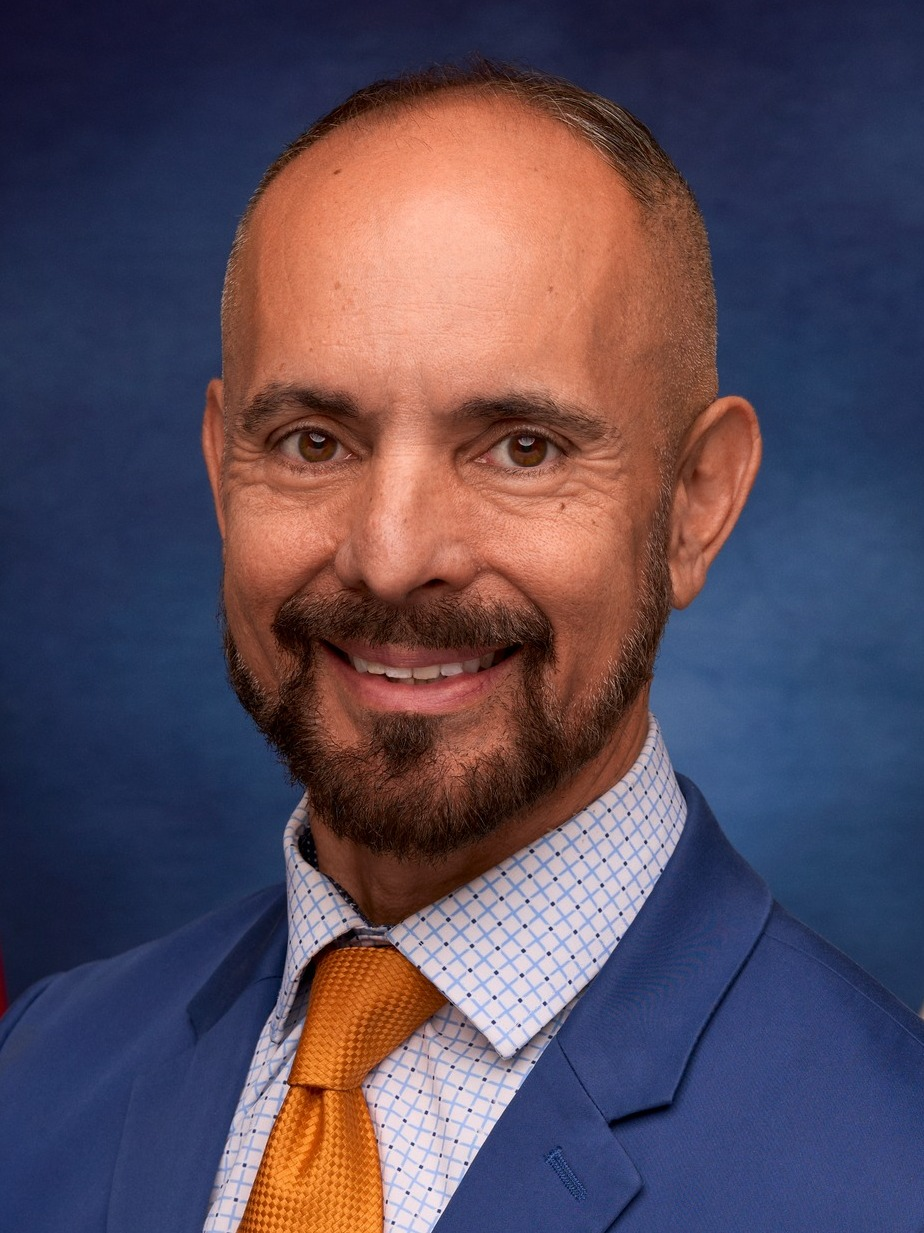

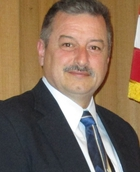
Candidate	Christopher Cabaldon	Thomas Bogue
Party	Democratic	Republican
Popular vote	277,092	165,742
Percentage	62.6%	37.4%
State senator before election
Bill Dodd
Democratic
Elected State senator
Christopher Cabaldon
Democratic

Including the eastern California Wine Country and University of California, Davis, the 3rd district consists of Napa, Yolo, and Solano counties. The incumbent was Democrat Bill Dodd of Napa, who was term-limited in 2024.

=== Candidates ===
- Thomas Bogue (Republican), Dixon city councilor
- Christopher Cabaldon (Democratic), former mayor of West Sacramento (1998–2020)
- Jackie Elward (Democratic), Rohnert Park city councilor
- Jimih Jones (Republican), automotive parts advisor and candidate for California's 4th congressional district in 2022
- Rozzana Verder-Aliga (Democratic), Vallejo city councilor

==== Withdrawn ====
- Alfredo Pedroza (Democratic), Napa County supervisor (2015–present)

==== Declined ====
- Martha Guerrero (Democratic), mayor of West Sacramento (2020–present) (endorsed Verder-Aliga)

=== Endorsements ===
Thomas Bogue (R)

Political parties

- American Independent Party
Christopher Cabaldon (D)

State legislators

- Cecilia Aguiar-Curry, state assemblywoman

Newspapers

- Bay Area Reporter
- East Bay Times
- The Sacramento Bee

Organizations

- Equality California
- LGBTQ Victory Fund
- Planned Parenthood Northern California Action Fund
- Reproductive Freedom for All California
Jackie Elward (D)

Labor unions

- AFSCME California
- AFSCME Council 57
- California Faculty Association (co-endorsement with Verder-Aliga)
- California Federation of Teachers (co-endorsement with Verder-Aliga)
- California Labor Federation (co-endorsement with Verder-Aliga)
- California Nurses Association
- National Union of Healthcare Workers
- SEIU California
- SEIU 1021
- Teamsters Joint Council 7 (co-endorsement with Verder-Aliga)
- United Association Local 38, Plumbers & Pipefitters

Political parties

- California Working Families Party

Organizations

- California Environmental Voters
- Consumer Attorneys of California
- Courage California
- Our Revolution East Bay
Rozzana Verder-Aliga (D)

Statewide officials

- Delaine Eastin, California state superintendent of public instruction (1995–2003)
- Eleni Kounalakis, lieutenant governor of California (2019–present)
- Fiona Ma, California state treasurer (2019–present)

State legislators

- Bill Dodd, state senator from SD-03 (2016–2024)

Political parties

- California Democratic Party

Labor unions

- California Faculty Association (co-endorsement with Elward)
- California Federation of Teachers (co-endorsement with Elward)
- California Labor Federation (co-endorsement with Elward)
- Sheet Metal Workers Local 104
- Teamsters Joint Council 7 (co-endorsement with Elward)

=== Fundraising ===
Campaign finance reports as of October 19, 2024
Candidate	Raised	Spent	Cash on hand
Christopher Cabaldon (D)	$640,186	$557,115	$269,298
Thom Bogue (R)	–	–	–
Source: Secretary of State of California

=== Results ===
2024 California's 3rd State Senate district election
Primary election
Party	Candidate	Votes	%
Republican	Thomas Bogue	61,885	27.8
Democratic	Christopher Cabaldon	59,134	26.6
Democratic	Rozzana Verder-Aliga	45,644	20.5
Democratic	Jackie Elward	41,225	18.5
Republican	Jimih Jones	14,749	6.6
Total votes		222,637	100.0
General election
Democratic	Christopher Cabaldon	277,092	62.6
Republican	Thom Bogue	165,742	37.4
Total votes		442,834	100.0
Democratic hold			

== District 5 ==
2024 California's 5th State Senate district election
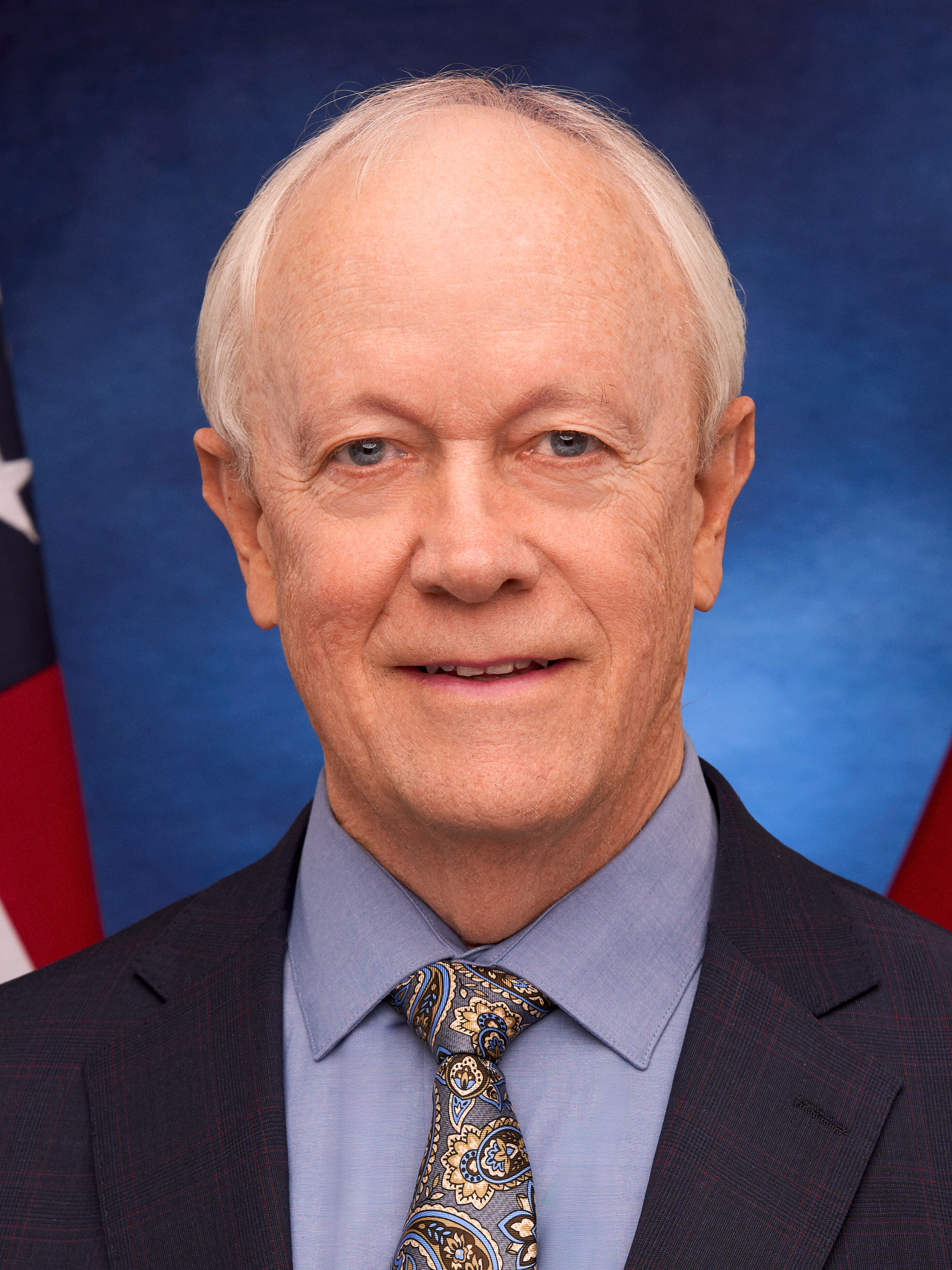

Candidate	Jerry McNerney	Jim Shoemaker
Party	Democratic	Republican
Popular vote	189,668	169,136
Percentage	52.9%	47.1%
Consolidated precinct results
McNerney
50-60%
60-70%
70-80%
Shoemaker
50–60%
60–70%
70–80%
80–90%
>90%
State senator before election
Susan Eggman
Democratic
Elected State senator
Jerry McNerney
Democratic

The 5th district encompasses the northern Central Valley, containing San Joaquin County and the northeastern portion of Alameda County, including the communities of Midway, Altamont, Ulmar, Livermore, Dublin, Pleasanton, and Sunol. The incumbent was Democrat Susan Eggman of Stockton, who was term-limited in 2024.

=== Candidates ===
- Jerry McNerney (Democratic), former U.S. representative for California's 9th congressional district (2007–2023)
- Jim Shoemaker (Republican), businessman and candidate for California's 9th congressional district in 2022
- Carlos Villapudua (Democratic), state assemblyman for the 13th district

==== Withdrew ====
- Rhodesia Ransom (Democratic), former Tracy city councilor (ran for state assembly)
- Edith Villapudua (Democratic), realtor and wife of state assemblyman Carlos Villapudua (ran for state assembly)
- Miguel Villapudua (Democratic), San Joaquin County supervisor and cousin of state assemblyman Carlos Villapudua

=== Endorsements ===
Jerry McNerney (D)

Labor unions

- California Faculty Association
- California Federation of Teachers
- California Labor Federation
- National Union of Healthcare Workers
- SEIU California

Organizations

- California Environmental Voters
- Consumer Attorneys of California
- Planned Parenthood Advocates Mar Monte
- Reproductive Freedom for All California

Newspapers

- East Bay Times
Jim Shoemaker (R)

Political parties

- American Independent Party
- California Republican Party
Rhodesia Ransom (D) (withdrawn)

Political parties

- California Democratic Party
Declined to endorse

Newspapers

- San Francisco Chronicle

=== Fundraising ===
Campaign finance reports as of October 19, 2024
Candidate	Raised	Spent	Cash on hand
Jerry McNerney (D)	$780,394	$820,817	$54,228
Jim Shoemaker (R)	$100,909	$77,257	$28,409
Source: Secretary of State of California

=== Results ===
2024 California's 5th State Senate district election
Primary election
Party	Candidate	Votes	%
Republican	Jim Shoemaker	75,630	43.7
Democratic	Jerry McNerney	57,435	33.2
Democratic	Carlos Villapudua	39,958	23.1
Total votes		173,023	100.0
General election
Democratic	Jerry McNerney	189,668	52.9
Republican	Jim Shoemaker	169,136	47.1
Total votes		358,804	100.0
Democratic hold			

== District 7 ==
2024 California's 7th State Senate district election
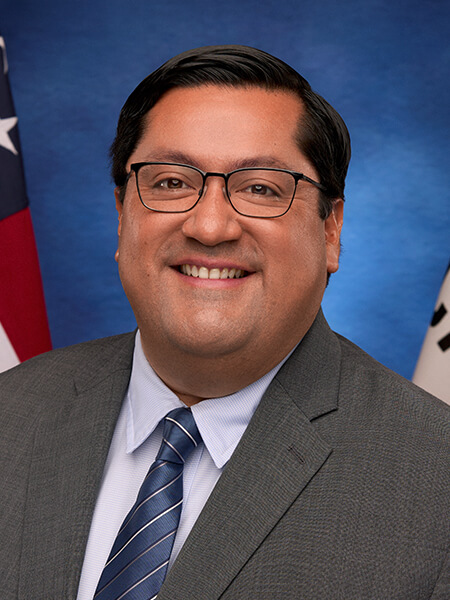

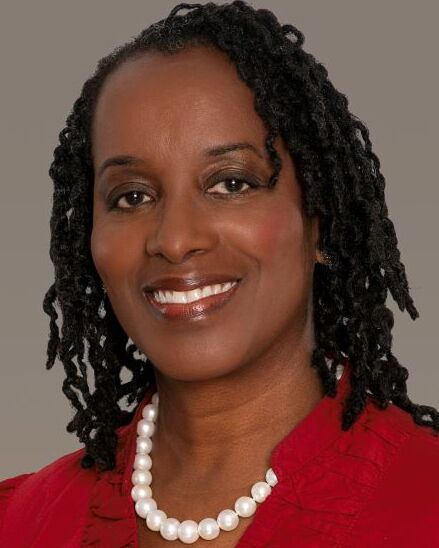
Candidate	Jesse Arreguín	Jovanka Beckles
Party	Democratic	Democratic
Popular vote	199,423	149,415
Percentage	57.2%	42.8%
Results by precinct
Arreguín: 50–55% 55–60% 60–65% 65-70% 70-75% 75-80%	Beckles: 50–55% 55–60% 60–65% 65–70% 70–75% 75–80% >80%	Tie No votes
State senator before election
Nancy Skinner
Democratic
Elected State senator
Jesse Arreguín
Democratic

The East Bay-based 7th district consists of the urban, coastal northwestern portion of Alameda County, including Alameda, Oakland, Piedmont, Emeryville, Berkeley, El Cerrito, and Richmond. The incumbent was Democrat Nancy Skinner of Berkeley, who was term-limited in 2024.

=== Candidates ===
- Jesse Arreguín (Democratic), mayor of Berkeley (2016–2024)
- Jovanka Beckles (Democratic), member of the AC Transit Board of Directors and former Richmond city councilor
- Dan Kalb (Democratic), Oakland city councilor (2013–present)
- Kathryn Lybarger (Democratic), president of California Labor Federation
- Jeanne Solnordal (Republican), broker
- Sandré Swanson (Democratic), former state assemblyman (2006–2012) and runner-up for this district in 2016

=== Endorsements ===
Jesse Arreguín (D)

Newspapers

- East Bay Times
- San Francisco Chronicle
Jovanka Beckles (D)

Newspapers

- Bay Area Reporter

Organizations

- East Bay Democratic Socialists of America
Kathryn Lybarger (D)

Labor unions

- AFSCME California
- California Faculty Association

Organizations

- Equality California
Jeanne Solnordal (R)

Political parties

- California Republican Party
Declined to endorse

Political parties

- California Democratic Party

=== Fundraising ===
Campaign finance reports as of October 19, 2024
Candidate	Raised	Spent	Cash on hand
Jesse Arreguín (D)	$986,310	$1,144,295	$139,291
Jovanka Beckles (D)	$249,263	$210,079	$49,520
Source: Secretary of State of California

=== Results ===
2024 California's 7th State Senate district election
Primary election
Party	Candidate	Votes	%
Democratic	Jesse Arreguín	61,892	32.1
Democratic	Jovanka Beckles	34,085	17.7
Democratic	Dan Kalb	28,881	15.0
Democratic	Kathryn Lybarger	28,070	14.6
Democratic	Sandré Swanson	22,907	11.9
Republican	Jeanne Solnordal	16,855	8.7
Total votes		192,690	100.0
General election
Democratic	Jesse Arreguín	199,423	57.2
Democratic	Jovanka Beckles	149,415	42.8
Total votes		348,838	100.0
Democratic hold			

== District 9 ==
2024 California's 9th State Senate district election
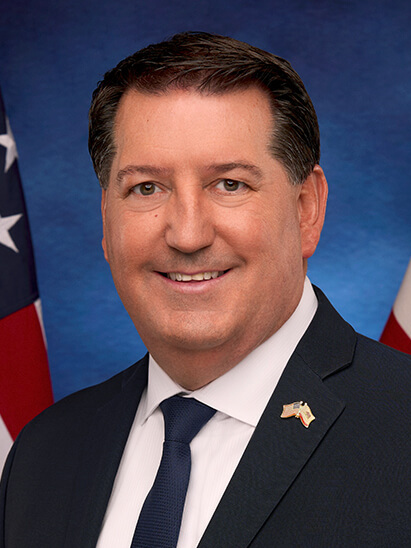

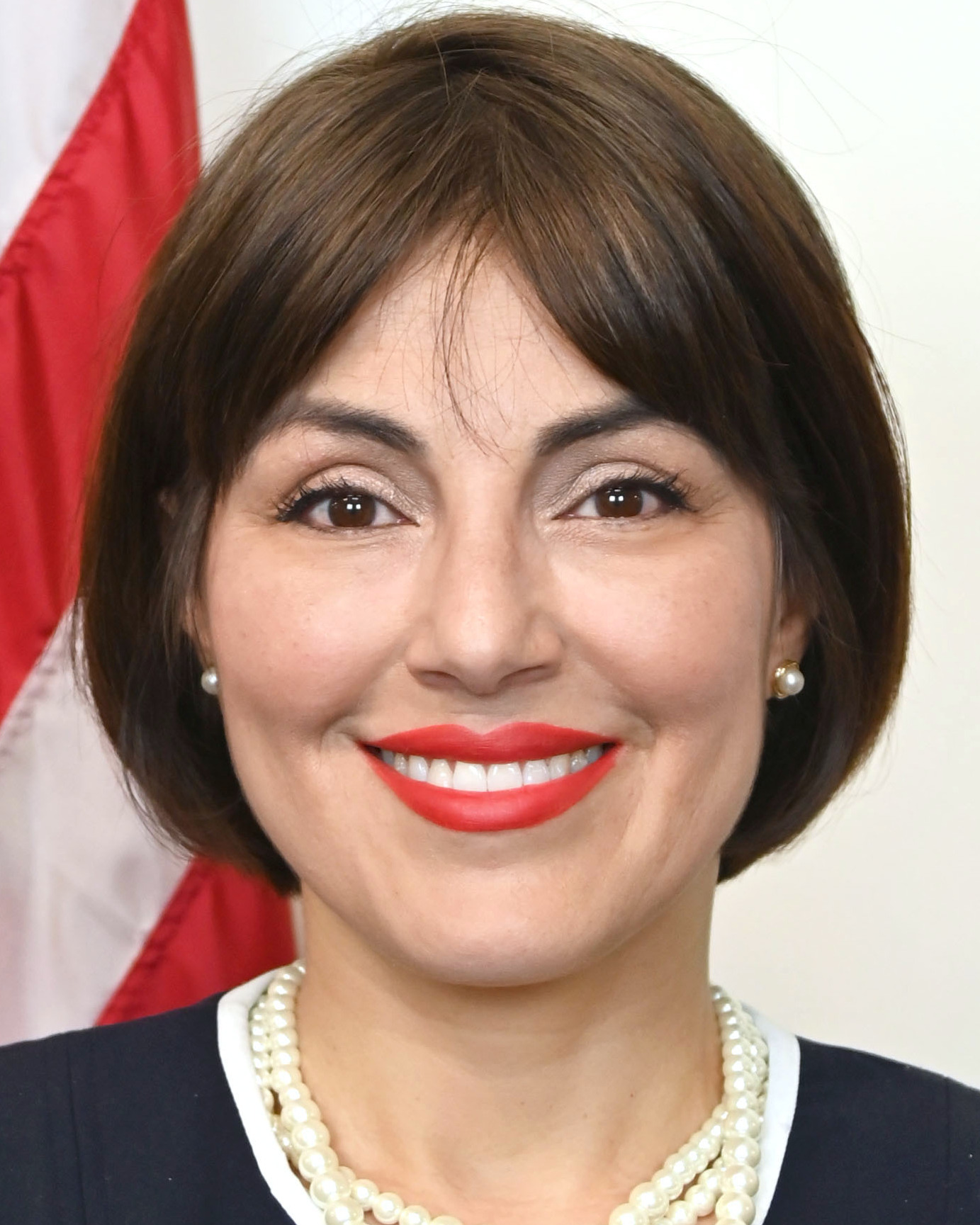
Candidate	Tim Grayson	Marisol Rubio
Party	Democratic	Democratic
Popular vote	193,558	178,776
Percentage	52.0%	48.0%
Consolidated precinct results
Grayson
50-60%
60-70%
70-80%
80-90%
>90%
Rubio
50–60%
60–70%
70–80%
80–90%
State senator before election
Steve Glazer
Democratic
Elected State senator
Tim Grayson
Democratic

The 9th district encompasses most of Contra Costa County, including Concord, Antioch, Pittsburg, Bay Point, Martinez, Pleasant Hill, Walnut Creek, Lafayette, Danville, San Ramon, and Orinda, along with Castro Valley, San Lorenzo, and San Leandro in Alameda County. The incumbent was Democrat Steve Glazer of Orinda, who was not seeking reelection in 2024.

=== Candidates ===
- Tim Grayson (Democratic), state assemblyman for the 15th district
- Joseph Grcar (Republican), computational scientist and perennial candidate (write-in)
- David Minor (Republican) (write-in)
- Marisol Rubio (Democratic), San Ramon city councilor and candidate for this district in 2020

==== Declined ====
- Steve Glazer (Democratic), incumbent state senator

=== Endorsements ===
Tim Grayson (D)

Newspapers

- East Bay Times

Organizations

- Equality California
David Minor (R)

Political parties

- California Republican Party
Marisol Rubio (D)

Political parties

- California Working Families Party

Labor unions

- California Faculty Association
Declined to endorse

Political parties

- California Democratic Party

=== Fundraising ===
Campaign finance reports as of October 19, 2024
Candidate	Raised	Spent	Cash on hand
Tim Grayson (D)	$853,398	$1,249,759	$309,960
Marisol Rubio (D)	$168,224	$211,649	$21,091
Source: Secretary of State of California

=== Results ===
2024 California's 9th State Senate district election
Primary election
Party	Candidate	Votes	%
Democratic	Tim Grayson	103,121	59.3
Democratic	Marisol Rubio	70,043	40.2
Republican	David Minor (write-in)	410	0.2
Republican	Joseph Grcar (write-in)	398	0.2
Total votes		173,972	100.0
General election
Democratic	Tim Grayson	193,558	52.0
Democratic	Marisol Rubio	178,776	48.0
Total votes		372,334	100.0
Democratic hold			

== District 11 ==
2024 California's 11th State Senate district election
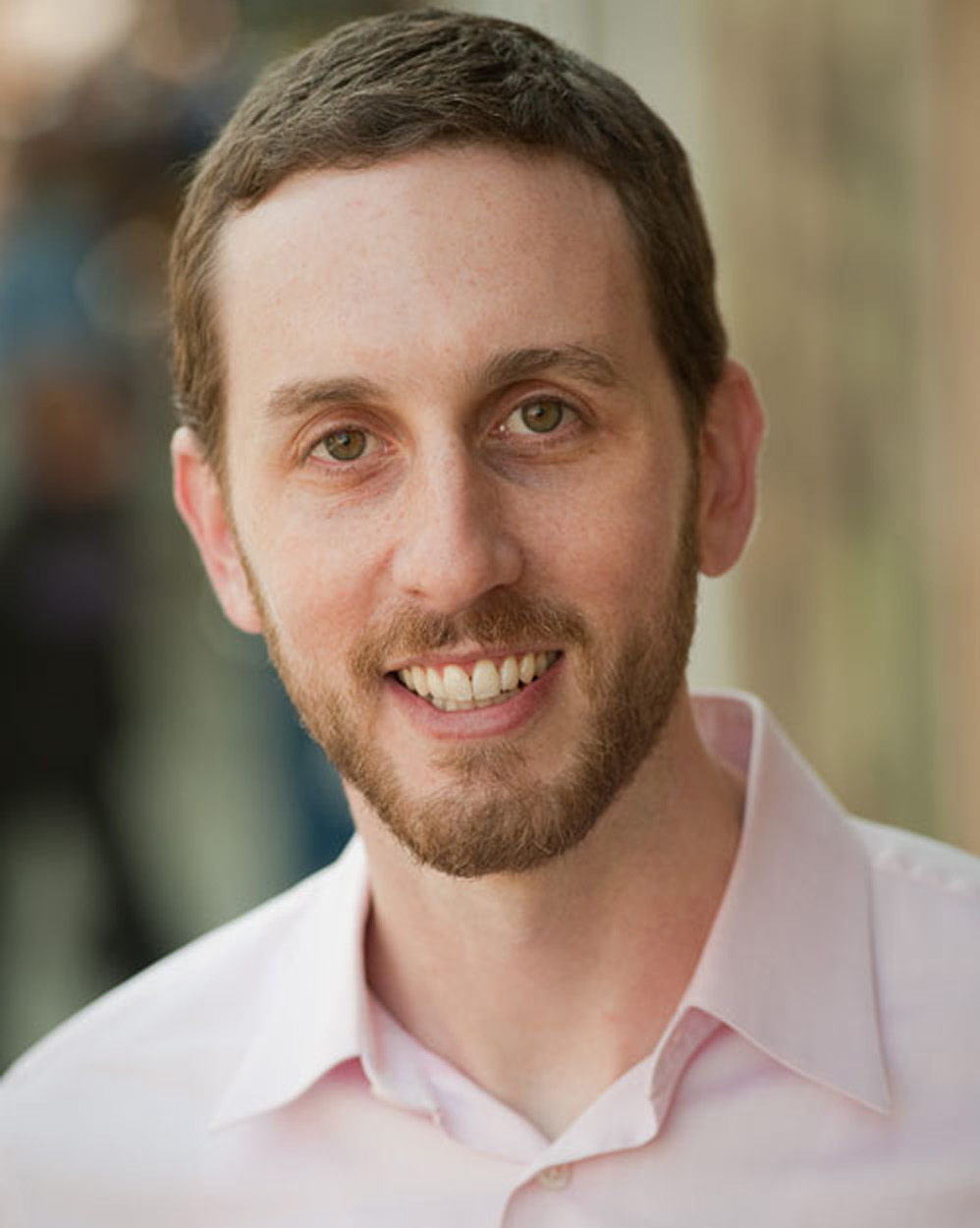

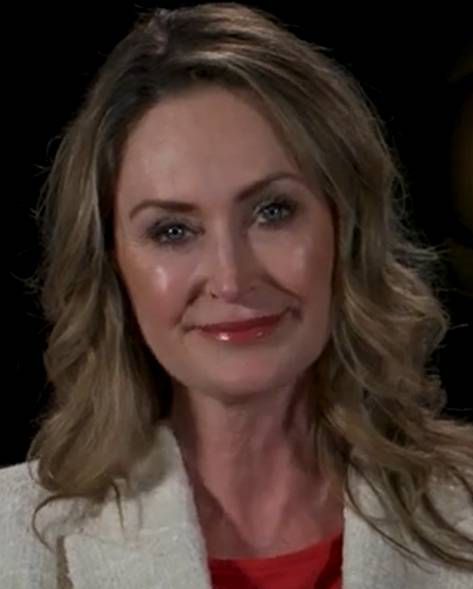
Candidate	Scott Wiener	Yvette Corkrean
Party	Democratic	Republican
Popular vote	325,148	92,715
Percentage	77.8%	22.2%
State senator before election
Scott Wiener
Democratic
Elected State senator
Scott Wiener
Democratic

The 11th district consists of San Francisco County and Daly City at the northern tip of San Mateo County. The incumbent was Democrat Scott Wiener of San Francisco, who was up for reelection in 2024.

=== Candidates ===
- Yvette Corkrean (Republican), nurse
- Cynthia Cravens (Democratic), community volunteer
- Scott Wiener (Democratic), incumbent state senator
- Jing Chao Xiong (no party preference/Independent), delivery driver

=== Endorsements ===
Yvette Corkrean (R)

Political parties

- American Independent Party
- California Republican Party
Scott Wiener (D)

Political parties

- California Democratic Party

Labor unions

- AFSCME California

Organizations

- California Environmental Voters
- Equality California

=== Fundraising ===
Campaign finance reports as of October 19, 2024
Candidate	Raised	Spent	Cash on hand
Scott Wiener (D)	$785,804	$977,047	$356,623
Yvette Corkrean (R)	$87,270	$88,580	$24,817
Source: Secretary of State of California

=== Results ===
2024 California's 11th State Senate district election
Primary election
Party	Candidate	Votes	%
Democratic	Scott Wiener (incumbent)	166,610	73.0
Republican	Yvette Corkrean	34,447	15.1
Democratic	Cynthia Cravens	18,519	8.1
No party preference	Jing Chao Xiong	8,717	3.8
Total votes		228,293	100.0
General election
Democratic	Scott Wiener (incumbent)	325,148	77.8
Republican	Yvette Corkrean	92,715	22.2
Total votes		417,863	100.0
Democratic hold			

== District 13 ==
2024 California's 13th State Senate district election
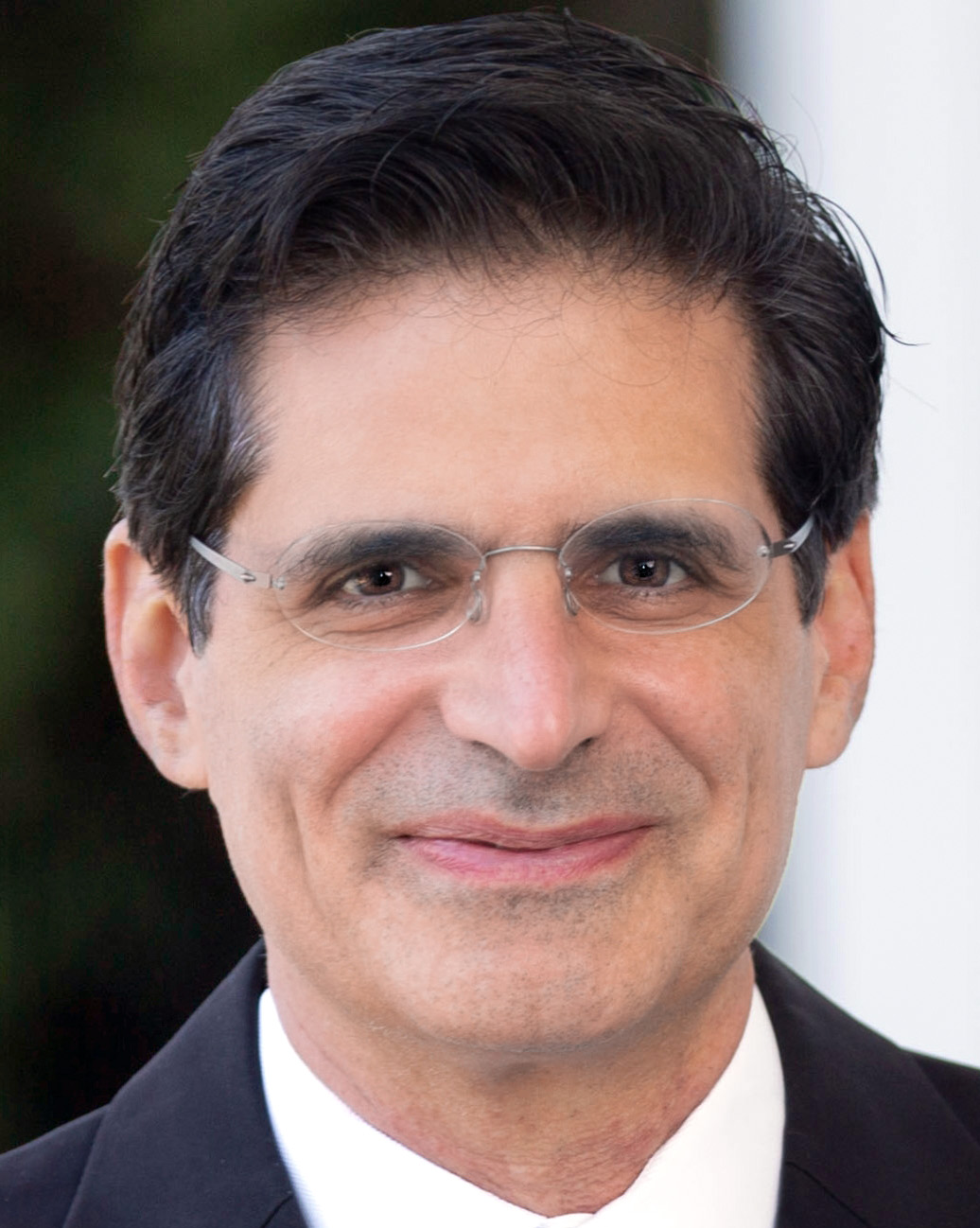

Candidate	Josh Becker	Alexander Glew
Party	Democratic	Republican
Popular vote	314,889	119,674
Percentage	72.5%	27.5%
State senator before election
Josh Becker
Democratic
Elected State senator
Josh Becker
Democratic

The 13th district encompassed the southern Bay Area to take in most of San Mateo County, including the communities of South San Francisco, Pacifica, San Bruno, Millbrae, Burlingame, San Mateo, Foster City, El Granada, Half Moon Bay, San Carlos, Redwood City, Woodside, and Menlo Park, along with the western Santa Clara County communities of Palo Alto, Stanford, Mountain View, Cupertino, Saratoga, and Los Gatos. The incumbent was first-term Democrat Josh Becker of Menlo Park, who was up for reelection in 2024.

=== Candidates ===
- Josh Becker (Democratic), incumbent state senator
- Alexander Glew (Republican), engineer
- Christina Laskowski (Republican), investment banker

=== Endorsements ===
Josh Becker (D)

Political parties

- California Democratic Party

Labor unions

- AFSCME California

Organizations

- California Environmental Voters
- Equality California
Christina Laskowski (R)

Political parties

- American Independent Party

=== Fundraising ===
Campaign finance reports as of October 19, 2024
Candidate	Raised	Spent	Cash on hand
Josh Becker (D)	$367,910	$710,048	$143,117
Alexander Glew (R)	$100	$1,184	$104
Source: Secretary of State of California

=== Results ===
2024 California's 13th State Senate district election
Primary election
Party	Candidate	Votes	%
Democratic	Josh Becker (incumbent)	167,285	73.6
Republican	Alexander Glew	42,841	18.8
Republican	Christina Laskowski	17,295	7.6
Total votes		227,421	100.0
General election
Democratic	Josh Becker (incumbent)	314,889	72.5
Republican	Alexander Glew	119,674	27.5
Total votes		434,563	100.0
Democratic hold			

== District 15 ==
2024 California's 15th State Senate district election
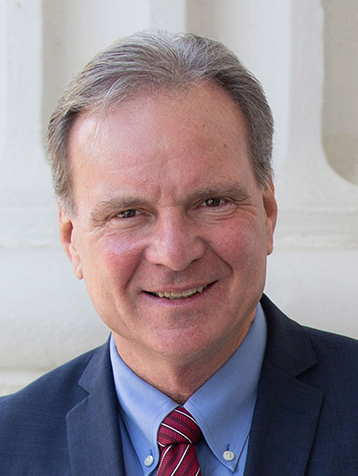

Candidate	Dave Cortese	Robert Howell
Party	Democratic	Republican
Popular vote	260,719	119,310
Percentage	68.6%	31.4%
State senator before election
Dave Cortese
Democratic
Elected State senator
Dave Cortese
Democratic

The 15th district encompassed central and eastern Santa Clara County. Most of the district's population lived in San Jose, but it also included some outlying areas like Mount Hamilton, Coyote, Sveadal, Morgan Hill, and Gilroy. The incumbent was first-term Democrat Dave Cortese of San Jose, who was up for reelection in 2024.

=== Candidates ===
- Dave Cortese (Democratic), incumbent state senator
- Robert Howell (Republican), president of Exatron and runner-up for California insurance commissioner in 2022
- Tony Loaiza (Republican), software executive

=== Endorsements ===
Dave Cortese (D)

Political parties

- California Democratic Party

Labor unions

- AFSCME California

Organizations

- California Environmental Voters
- Equality California
Robert Howell (R)

Political parties

- American Independent Party

=== Fundraising ===
Campaign finance reports as of October 19, 2024
Candidate	Raised	Spent	Cash on hand
Dave Cortese (D)	$535,030	$458,412	$421,155
Robert Paul Howell (R)	$0	$2,210	$4,269
Source: Secretary of State of California

=== Results ===
2024 California's 15th State Senate district election
Primary election
Party	Candidate	Votes	%
Democratic	Dave Cortese (incumbent)	124,539	69.0
Republican	Robert Paul Howell	34,205	19.0
Republican	Tony Loaiza	21,643	12.0
Total votes		180,387	100.0
General election
Democratic	Dave Cortese (incumbent)	260,719	68.6
Republican	Robert Paul Howell	119,310	31.4
Total votes		380,029	100.0
Democratic hold			

== District 17 ==
2024 California's 17th State Senate district election
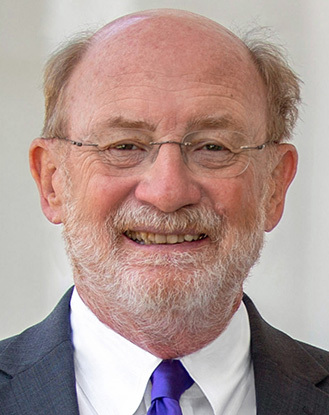

Candidate	John Laird	Tony Virrueta
Party	Democratic	Republican
Popular vote	269,862	144,992
Percentage	65.0%	35.0%
State senator before election
John Laird
Democratic
Elected State senator
John Laird
Democratic

The 17th district consisted of the Big Sur section of the Central Coast, including Santa Cruz. San Benito, and Monterey counties, along with northern San Luis Obispo County. The incumbent was Democrat John Laird of Santa Cruz, who was up for reelection in 2024.

=== Candidates ===
- John Laird (Democratic), incumbent state senator
- Michael Oxford (Libertarian), AV technician
- Eric Tao (Republican), Cal State Monterey Bay computer science professor
- Tony Virrueta (Republican), veterans' advocate

=== Endorsements ===
John Laird (D)

Political parties

- California Democratic Party

Labor unions

- AFSCME California

Organizations

- California Environmental Voters
- Equality California
Eric Tao (R)

Political parties

- American Independent Party
Tony Virrueta (R)

Political parties

- California Republican Party

=== Fundraising ===
Campaign finance reports as of October 19, 2024
Candidate	Raised	Spent	Cash on hand
John Laird (D)	$309,878	$518,379	$982,351
Tony Virrueta (R)	$17,241	$9,604	$2,291
Source: Secretary of State of California

=== Results ===
2024 California's 17th State Senate district election
Primary election
Party	Candidate	Votes	%
Democratic	John Laird (incumbent)	143,912	64.5
Republican	Tony Virrueta	48,829	21.9
Republican	Eric Tao	25,845	11.6
Libertarian	Michael Oxford	4,591	2.1
Total votes		223,177	100.0
General election
Democratic	John Laird (incumbent)	269,862	65.0
Republican	Tony Virrueta	144,992	35.0
Total votes		414,854	100.0
Democratic hold			

== District 19 ==
2024 California's 19th State Senate district election
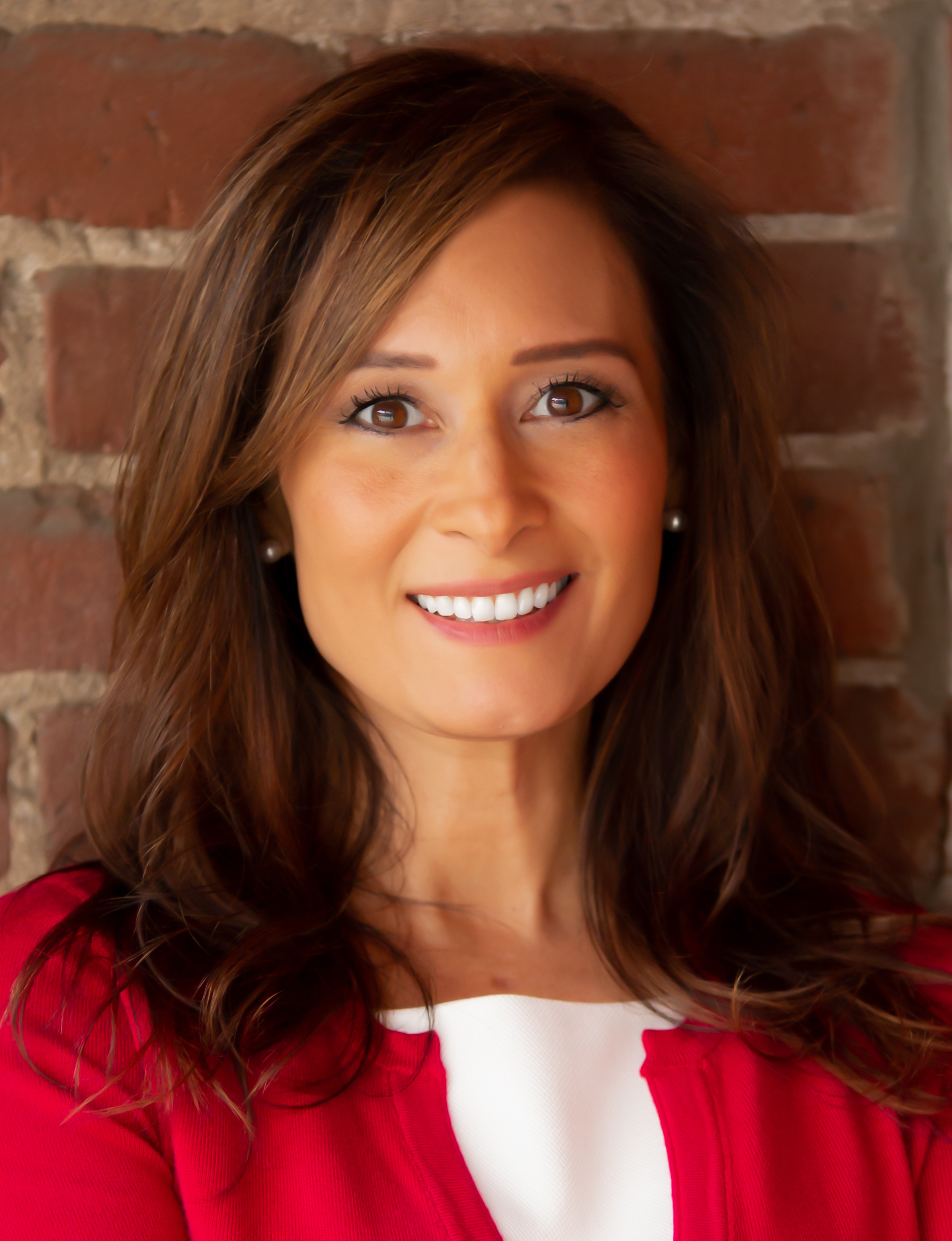

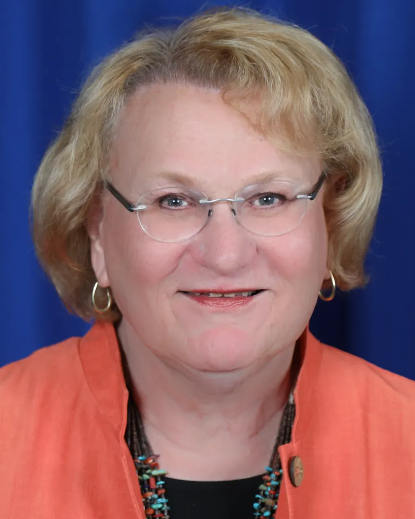
Candidate	Rosilicie Ochoa Bogh	Lisa Middleton
Party	Republican	Democratic
Popular vote	209,739	173,291
Percentage	54.8%	45.2%
State senator before election
Rosilicie Ochoa Bogh
Republican
Elected State senator
Rosilicie Ochoa Bogh
Republican

The 19th district encompassed much of the Mojave Desert as well as most of the Inland Empire's land area. It includes the central San Bernardino County communities of Barstow, Hodge, Apple Valley, Crestline, Big Bear City, Grand Terrace, Loma Linda, Redlands, Yucaipa, Yucca Valley, Joshua Tree, and Twentynine Palms, and the central Riverside County communities of Beaumont, Banning, Desert Hot Springs, Palm Springs, Cathedral City, Palm Desert, Indian Wells, and La Quinta. The incumbent was first-term Republican Rosilicie Ochoa Bogh of Yucaipa and the former 23rd district, who was up for reelection in 2024.

=== Candidates ===
- Rosilicie Ochoa Bogh (Republican), incumbent state senator
- Lisa Middleton (Democratic), Palm Springs city councilor

=== Endorsements ===
Rosilicie Ochoa Bogh (R)

U.S. representatives

- Ken Calvert, CA-41
- Jay Obernolte, CA-23

Labor unions

- California Professional Firefighters
- Southwest Regional Council of Carpenters

Organizations

- Howard Jarvis Taxpayers Association
- National Federation of Independent Business
- NRA Political Victory Fund

Newspapers

- Inland Valley Daily Bulletin
- Press-Enterprise
- Redlands Daily Facts
- The San Bernardino Sun

Political parties

- California Republican Party
Lisa Middleton (D)

Labor unions

- AFSCME California

Organizations

- Equality California
- LGBTQ Victory Fund
- Stonewall Democrats

Political parties

- California Democratic Party

=== Fundraising ===
Campaign finance reports as of October 19, 2024
Candidate	Raised	Spent	Cash on hand
Rosilicie Ochoa Bogh (R)	$1,295,116	$1,112,390	$792,798
Lisa Middleton (D)	$1,493,738	$1,578,113	$78,142
Source: Secretary of State of California

=== Results ===
2024 California's 19th State Senate district election
Primary election
Party	Candidate	Votes	%
Republican	Rosilicie Ochoa Bogh (incumbent)	101,118	53.8
Democratic	Lisa Middleton	86,975	46.2
Total votes		188,093	100.0
General election
Republican	Rosilicie Ochoa Bogh (incumbent)	209,739	54.8
Democratic	Lisa Middleton	173,291	45.2
Total votes		383,030	100.0
Republican hold			

== District 21 ==
2024 California's 21st State Senate district election
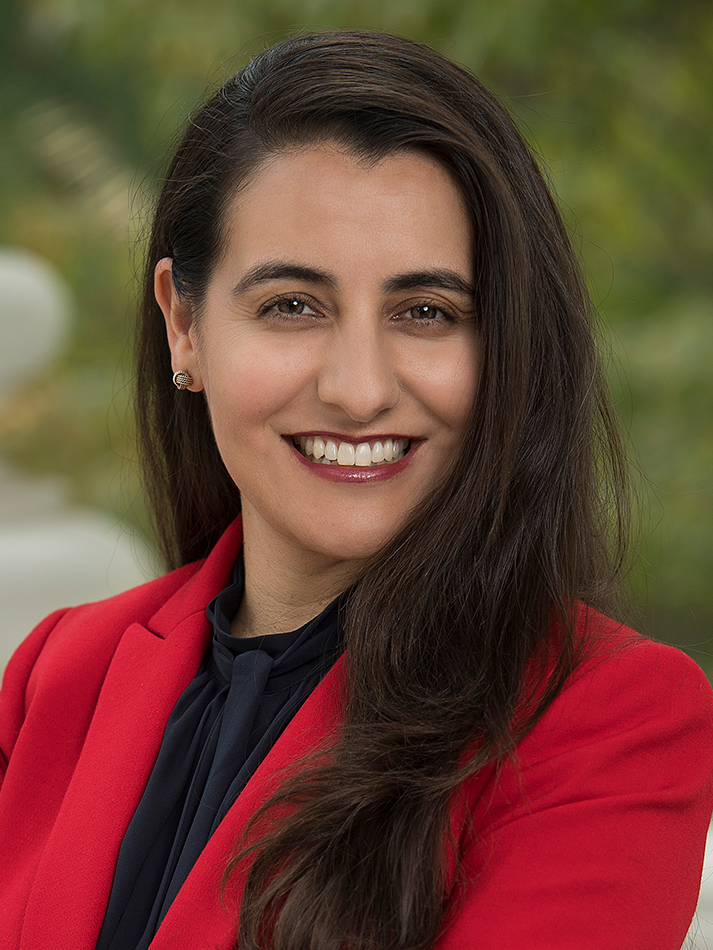

Candidate	Monique Limón	Elijah Mack
Party	Democratic	Republican
Popular vote	260,656	151,365
Percentage	63.3%	36.7%
State senator before election
Monique Limón
Democratic
Elected State senator
Monique Limón
Democratic

The 21st district consisted of Santa Barbara County and southern San Luis Obispo County, along with the northern and western portions of Ventura County, including Ojai, Fillmore, Santa Paula, Ventura, Oxnard, Camarillo, and Port Hueneme. The incumbent was first-term Democrat Monique Limón of Santa Barbara and the former 19th district, who was up for reelection in 2024.

=== Candidates ===
- Monique Limón (Democratic), incumbent state senator
- Elijah Mack (Republican), college student

=== Endorsements ===
Monique Limón (D)

Political parties

- California Democratic Party

Labor unions

- AFSCME California

Organizations

- California Environmental Voters
- Equality California
Elijah Mack (R)

Political parties

- California Republican Party

=== Fundraising ===
Campaign finance reports as of October 19, 2024
Candidate	Raised	Spent	Cash on hand
Monique Limón (D)	$523,339	$505,941	$870,800
Elijah Mack (R)	–	–	–
Source: Secretary of State of California

=== Results ===
2024 California's 21st State Senate district election
Primary election
Party	Candidate	Votes	%
Democratic	Monique Limón (incumbent)	127,979	61.9
Republican	Elijah Mack	78,816	38.1
Total votes		206,795	100.0
General election
Democratic	Monique Limón (incumbent)	260,656	63.3
Republican	Elijah Mack	151,365	36.7
Total votes		412,021	100.0
Democratic hold			

== District 23 ==
2024 California's 23rd State Senate district election
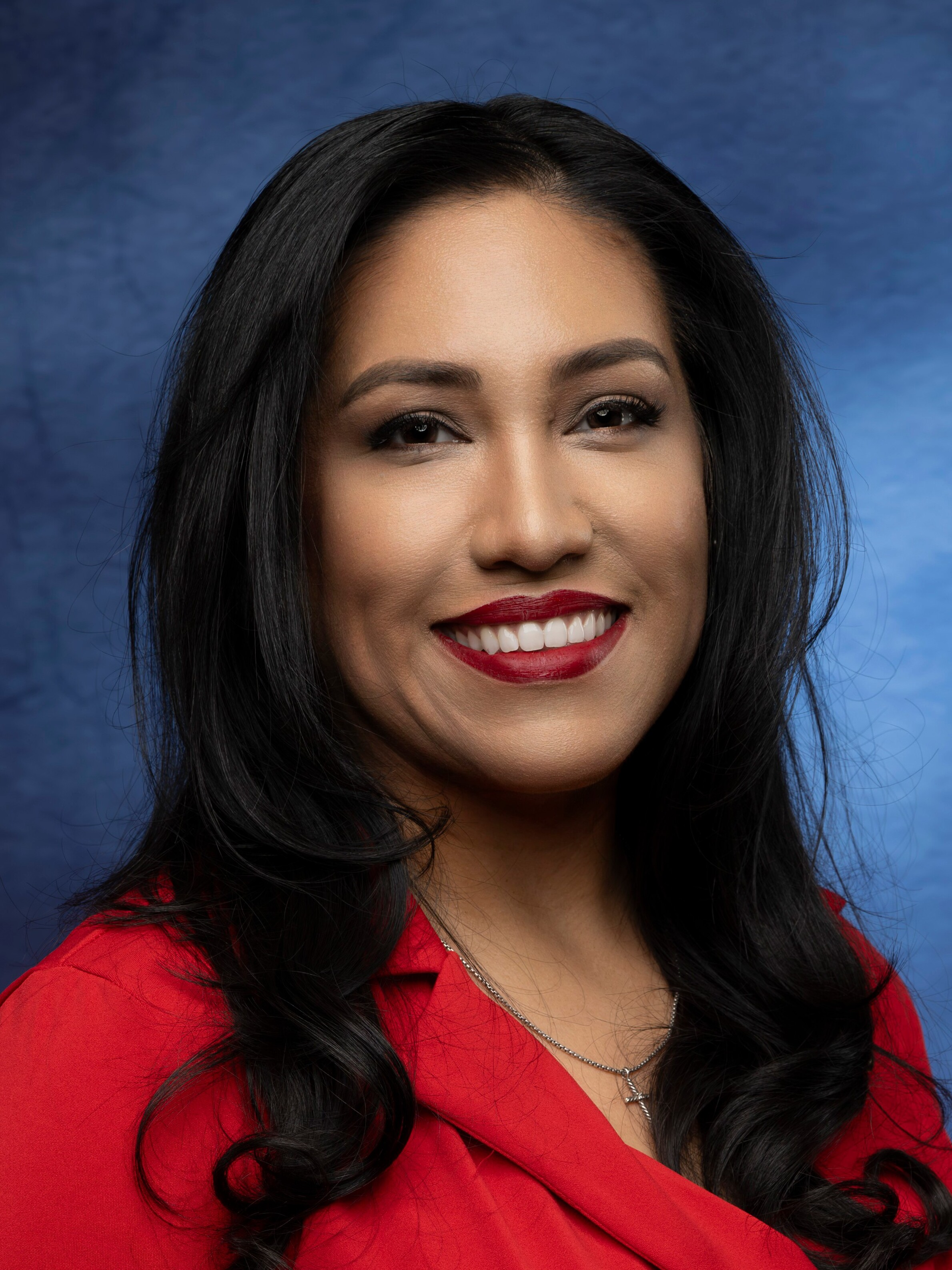

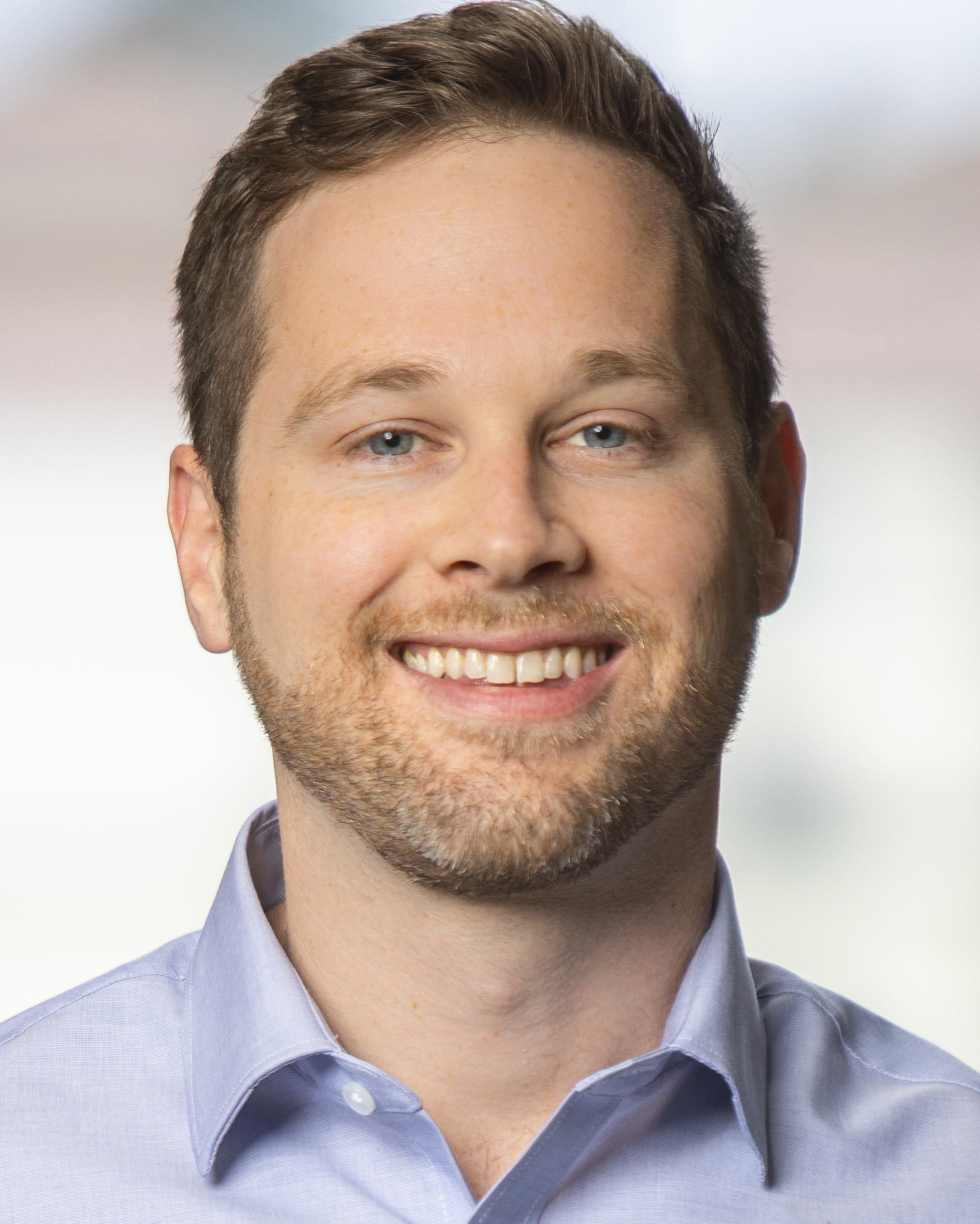
Candidate	Suzette Martinez Valladares	Kipp Mueller
Party	Republican	Democratic
Popular vote	190,957	173,695
Percentage	52.4%	47.6%
State senator before election
Scott Wilk
Republican
Elected State senator
Suzette Martinez Valladares
Republican

The 23rd district encompasses the Antelope Valley and Victor Valley. It includes the northern Los Angeles County communities of Santa Clarita, Quartz Hill, Lancaster, Palmdale, Acton, and Lake Los Angeles, along with the western San Bernardino County communities of Phelan, Adelanto, Victorville, and Hesperia. The incumbent was Republican Scott Wilk of Santa Clarita and the former 21st district, who was term-limited in 2024.

=== Candidates ===
- Blanca Azucena Gomez (Democratic), Victorville city councilor and candidate for California's 23rd congressional district in 2022
- James "DJ" Hamburger (Republican), Army National Guard officer
- Ollie McCaulley (Democratic), acquisition training executive and U.S. Marine Corps veteran
- Kipp Mueller (Democratic), civil rights attorney and runner-up for the 21st district in 2020
- Suzette Martinez Valladares (Republican), former state assemblywoman for the 38th district (2020–2022)

==== Withdrawn ====
- Eric Ohlsen (Democratic), Palmdale city councilor

=== Endorsements ===
James Hamburger (R)

Political parties

- American Independent Party
Kipp Mueller (D)

State assemblymembers

- Rick Zbur, AD-51 (2022–present)

Political parties

- California Democratic Party
- Los Angeles County Democratic Party

Labor unions

- AFSCME California
- California Faculty Association

Organizations

- California Environmental Voters
- Equality California
- Stonewall Democrats
Suzette Martinez Valladares (R)
- Ken Calvert, CA-41
- Jay Obernolte, CA-23

State senators

- Scott Wilk, SD-21 (2016–2024)

State assemblymembers

- Tom Lackey, AD-34 (2014–present)

Labor unions

- California Professional Firefighters
- Southwest Regional Council of Carpenters

Organizations

- Howard Jarvis Taxpayers Association
- National Federation of Independent Business
- Santa Clarita Valley Chamber of Commerce

Newspapers

- Los Angeles Daily News
- The San Bernardino Sun
- Santa Clarita Valley Signal
Eric Ohlsen (D) (withdrawn)

State assemblymembers

- Juan Carrillo, AD-39 (2022–present)

=== Fundraising ===
Campaign finance reports as of October 19, 2024
Candidate	Raised	Spent	Cash on hand
Suzette Martinez Valladares (R)	$1,690,235	$1,822,887	$180,681
Kipp Mueller (D)	$5,092,729	$5,304,339	$172,094
Source: Secretary of State of California

=== Results ===
2024 California's 23rd State Senate district election
Primary election
Party	Candidate	Votes	%
Republican	Suzette Martinez Valladares	50,937	32.8
Democratic	Kipp Mueller	45,754	29.4
Republican	James "DJ" Hamburger	37,075	23.8
Democratic	Blanca Azucena Gomez	14,257	9.2
Democratic	Ollie McCaulley	7,439	4.8
Total votes		155,462	100.0
General election
Republican	Suzette Martinez Valladares	190,957	52.4
Democratic	Kipp Mueller	173,695	47.6
Total votes		364,652	100.0
Republican hold			

== District 25 ==
2024 California's 25th State Senate district election
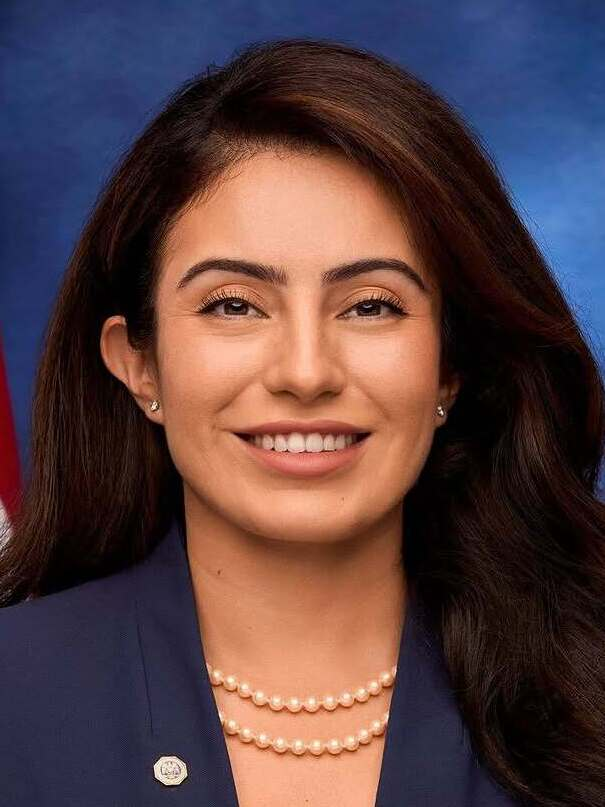

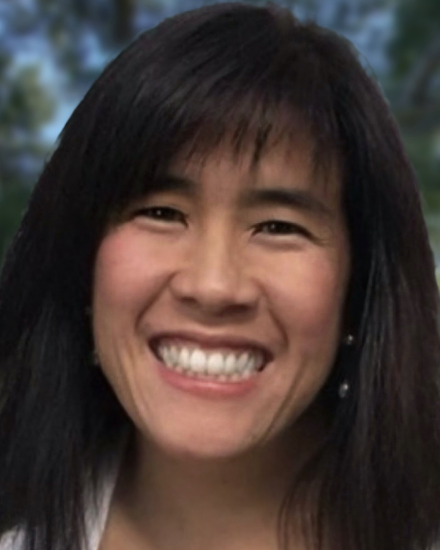
Candidate	Sasha Renée Pérez	Elizabeth Wong Ahlers
Party	Democratic	Republican
Popular vote	243,371	164,757
Percentage	59.6%	40.4%
State senator before election
Anthony Portantino
Democratic
Elected State senator
Sasha Renée Pérez
Democratic

The 25th district encompasses the western San Gabriel Valley in Los Angeles County, including the communities of Glendale, La Cañada Flintridge, Altadena, Pasadena, South Pasadena, San Marino, Alhambra, Monterey Park, San Gabriel, Rosemead, Temple City, Arcadia, Sierra Madre, Monrovia, the east San Gabriel Valley city of Glendora, and the Pomona Valley city of Claremont. The incumbent was Democrat Anthony Portantino of La Cañada Flintridge, who was term-limited in 2024.

=== Candidates ===
- Elizabeth Wong Ahlers (Republican), Crescenta Valley town councilor
- Sandra Armenta (Democratic), Rosemead city councilor
- Teddy Choi (Democratic), insurance agent
- Sasha Renée Pérez (Democratic), mayor of Alhambra
- Yvonne Yiu (Democratic), Monterey Park city councilor and candidate for state controller in 2022

==== Withdrawn ====
- John Harabedian (Democratic), former mayor of Sierra Madre (2012–2020) (ran for state assembly)

=== Endorsements ===
Elizabeth Wong Ahlers (R)

Political parties

- American Independent Party
- California Republican Party
Sasha Renée Pérez (D)

Political parties

- California Democratic Party
- California Working Families Party
- Los Angeles County Democratic Party

Labor unions

- AFSCME California
- California Faculty Association

Organizations

- California Environmental Voters
- Equality California
- Stonewall Democrats
John Harabedian (D) (withdrawn)

State senators

- Josh Newman, SD-29 (2020–2024)

=== Fundraising ===
Campaign finance reports as of October 19, 2024
Candidate	Raised	Spent	Cash on hand
Sasha Renée Pérez (D)	$696,714	$1,093,651	$325,023
Elizabeth Wong Ahlers (R)	$316,135	$297,405	$40,609
Source: Secretary of State of California

=== Results ===
2024 California's 25th State Senate district election
Primary election
Party	Candidate	Votes	%
Republican	Elizabeth Wong Ahlers	73,002	35.7
Democratic	Sasha Renée Pérez	67,266	32.9
Democratic	Yvonne Yiu	35,693	17.5
Democratic	Sandra Armenta	19,486	9.5
Democratic	Teddy Choi	8,881	4.3
Total votes		204,328	100.0
General election
Democratic	Sasha Renée Pérez	243,371	59.6
Republican	Elizabeth Wong Ahlers	164,757	40.4
Total votes		408,128	100.0
Democratic hold			

== District 27 ==
2024 California's 27th State Senate district election
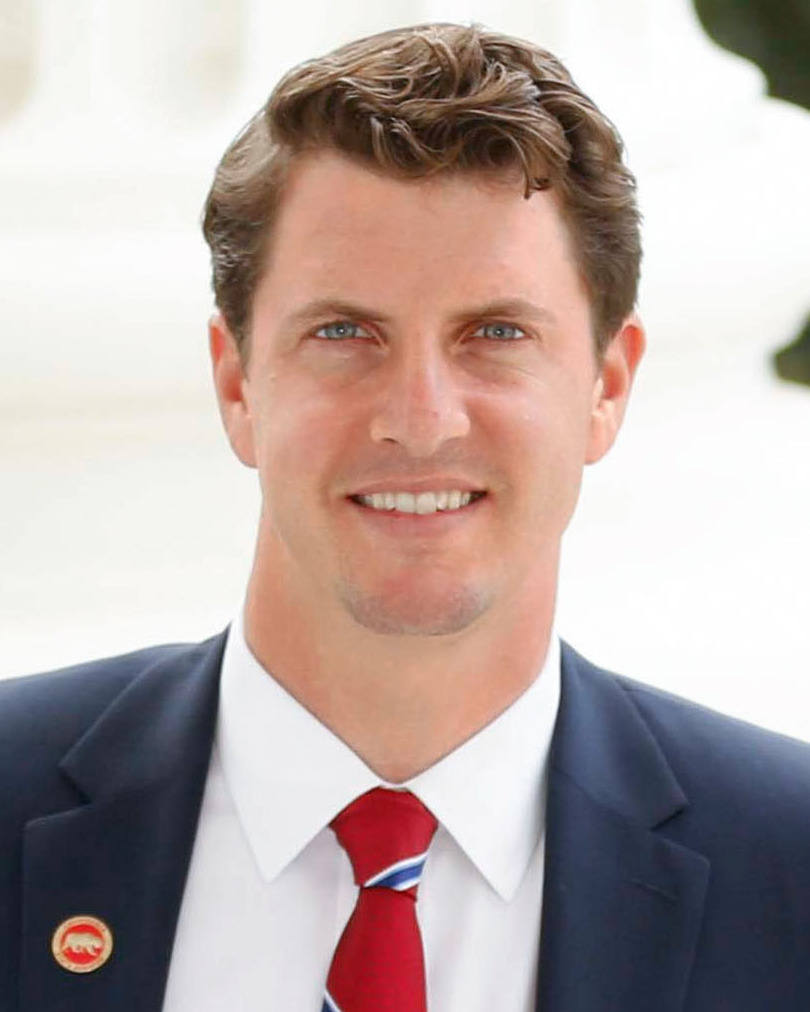

Candidate	Henry Stern	Lucie Volotzky
Party	Democratic	Republican
Popular vote	270,005	183,967
Percentage	59.5%	40.5%
State senator before election
Henry Stern
Democratic
Elected State senator
Henry Stern
Democratic

The 27th district consisted of the eastern Ventura County communities of Moorpark, Thousand Oaks, Simi Valley, Santa Susana, Hidden Valley, and Lake Sherwood, and the western San Fernando Valley communities of Granada Hills, Porter Ranch, Chatsworth, West Hills, Woodland Hills, and Tarzana in the northwestern corner of Los Angeles. The incumbent was Democrat Henry Stern of Malibu, who was up for reelection in 2024.

=== Candidates ===
- Susan Collins (Democratic), Sherman Oaks neighborhood councilor
- Henry Stern (Democratic), incumbent state senator
- Lucie Volotzky (Republican), furniture store owner and runner-up for California's 32nd congressional district in 2022

=== Endorsements ===
Henry Stern (D)

Political parties

- California Democratic Party
- Los Angeles County Democratic Party

Labor unions

- AFSCME California

Organizations

- California Environmental Voters
- Equality California
- Stonewall Democrats
Lucie Volotzky (R)

Political parties

- American Independent Party
- California Republican Party

=== Fundraising ===
Campaign finance reports as of October 19, 2024
Candidate	Raised	Spent	Cash on hand
Henry Stern (D)	$342,294	$325,323	$408,027
Lucie Volotzky (R)	$46,040	$36,487	$5,987
Source: Secretary of State of California

=== Results ===
2024 California's 27th State Senate district election
Primary election
Party	Candidate	Votes	%
Democratic	Henry Stern (incumbent)	98,160	44.1
Republican	Lucie Volotzky	84,758	38.1
Democratic	Susan Collins	39,488	17.8
Total votes		222,406	100.0
General election
Democratic	Henry Stern (incumbent)	270,005	59.5
Republican	Lucie Volotzky	183,967	40.5
Total votes		453,972	100.0
Democratic hold			

== District 29 ==
2024 California's 29th State Senate district election
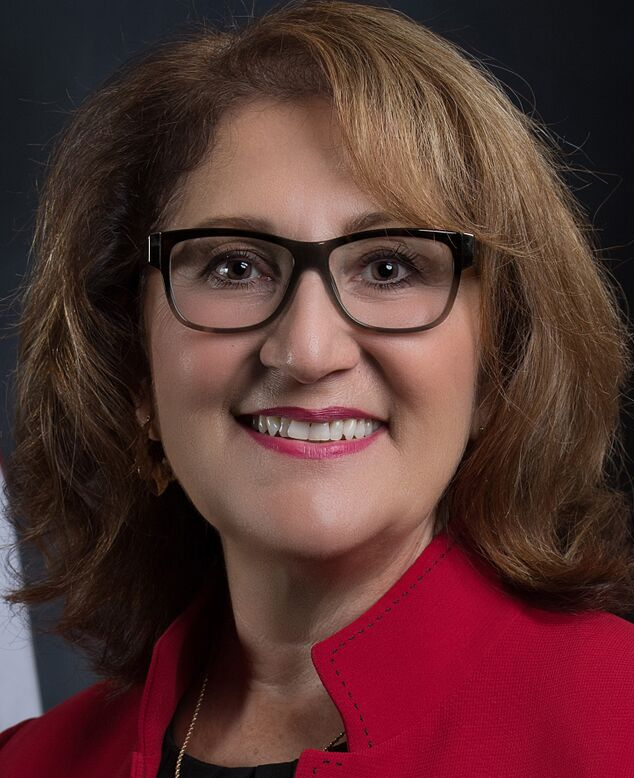

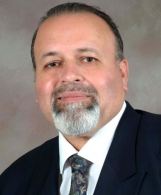
Candidate	Eloise Reyes	Carlos Garcia
Party	Democratic	Republican
Popular vote	160,820	121,085
Percentage	57.0%	43.0%
State senator before election
None
Elected State senator
Eloise Gómez Reyes
Democratic

The new 29th district encompasses the urban southwestern portion of San Bernardino County, including the cities of San Bernardino, Highland, Colton, Rialto, Bloomington, Fontana, Rancho Cucamonga, and Upland. The district had no incumbent.

=== Candidates ===
- Carlos Garcia (Republican), Upland city councilor
- Kathleen Torres Hazleton (Republican), retired nurse midwife and U.S. Air Force veteran
- Jason O'Brien (Democratic), LAPD detective and former Fontana Unified School District Board member
- Eloise Gómez Reyes (Democratic), state assemblywoman for the 50th district (2018–2024)

=== Endorsements ===
Carlos Garcia (R)

Political parties

- California Republican Party
Eloise Gómez Reyes (D)

Political parties

- California Democratic Party
- California Working Families Party

Labor unions

- AFSCME California
- California Faculty Association

Organizations

- California Environmental Voters
- Equality California
- Stonewall Democrats

=== Fundraising ===
Campaign finance reports as of October 19, 2024
Candidate	Raised	Spent	Cash on hand
Eloise Gómez Reyes (D)	$694,276	$553,196	$585,657
Carlos A. Garcia (R)	$57,904	$43,201	$15,949
Source: Secretary of State of California

=== Results ===
2024 California's 29th State Senate district election
Primary election
Party	Candidate	Votes	%
Democratic	Eloise Gómez Reyes	44,977	45.0
Republican	Carlos Garcia	31,947	32.0
Republican	Kathleen Torres Hazleton	12,996	13.0
Democratic	Jason O'Brien	10,045	10.0
Total votes		99,965	100.0
General election
Democratic	Eloise Gómez Reyes	160,820	57.0
Republican	Carlos Garcia	121,085	43.0
Total votes		281,905	100.0
Democratic hold			

== District 31 ==
2024 California's 31st State Senate district election
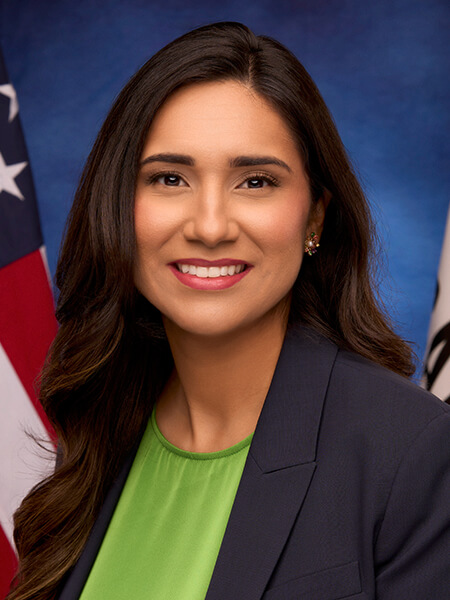

Candidate	Sabrina Cervantes	Cynthia Navarro
Party	Democratic	Republican
Popular vote	153,282	128,994
Percentage	54.3%	45.7%
State senator before election
Richard Roth
Democratic
Elected State senator
Sabrina Cervantes
Democratic

The 31st district encompassed the urban northwestern portion of Riverside County, including the cities of Riverside, Corona, Eastvale, Jurupa Valley, Moreno Valley, Mead Valley, Perris, and Nuevo. The incumbent was Democrat Richard Roth of Riverside, who was term-limited in 2024.

=== Candidates ===
- Sabrina Cervantes (Democratic), state assemblywoman for the 58th district (2016–2024)
- Angelo Farooq (Democratic), president of the Riverside Unified School District Board
- Cynthia Navarro (Republican), educator

=== Endorsements ===
Sabrina Cervantes (D)

Labor unions

- AFSCME California
- California Faculty Association

Organizations

- Equality California
- Stonewall Democrats
Angelo Farooq (D)

Newspapers

- Los Angeles Daily News
- The Press-Enterprise

Political parties

- American Independent Party
Declined to endorse

Political parties

- California Democratic Party

=== Fundraising ===
Campaign finance reports as of October 19, 2024
Candidate	Raised	Spent	Cash on hand
Sabrina Cervantes (D)	$487,863	$1,030,397	$281,234
Cynthia Navarro (R)	$545	$1,238	$306
Source: Secretary of State of California

=== Results ===
2024 California's 31st State Senate district election
Primary election
Party	Candidate	Votes	%
Republican	Cynthia Navarro	46,633	45.9
Democratic	Sabrina Cervantes	40,033	39.4
Democratic	Angelo Farooq	15,026	14.8
Total votes		101,692	100.0
General election
Democratic	Sabrina Cervantes	153,282	54.3
Republican	Cynthia Navarro	128,994	45.7
Total votes		282,276	100.0
Democratic hold			

== District 33 ==
2024 California's 33rd State Senate district election
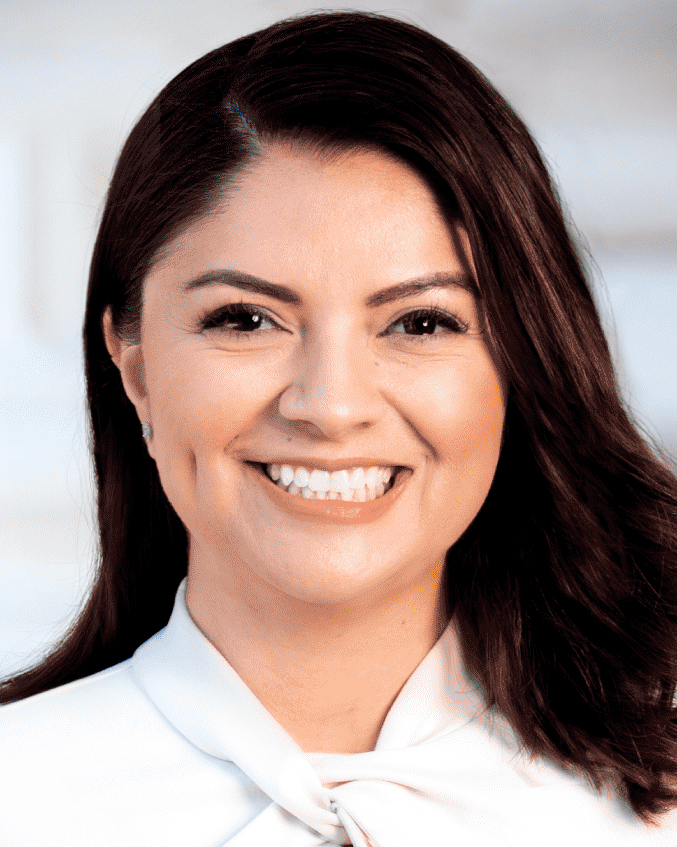

Candidate	Lena Gonzalez	Mario Paz
Party	Democratic	Republican
Popular vote	217,560	93,574
Percentage	69.9%	30.1%
State senator before election
Lena Gonzalez
Democratic
Elected State senator
Lena Gonzalez
Democratic

The 33rd district consisted of the southern Gateway Cities of Los Angeles County, including Long Beach, Signal Hill, Lakewood, Paramount, Lynwood, South Gate, Cudahy, Huntington Park, Bell, Maywood, Bell Gardens, and Commerce. The incumbent was Democrat Lena Gonzalez of Long Beach, who was up for reelection in 2024.

=== Candidates ===
- Lena Gonzalez (Democratic), incumbent state senator
- Sharifah Hardie (Republican), business consultant
- Mario Paz (Republican), accountant

=== Endorsements ===
Lena Gonzalez (D)

Political parties

- California Democratic Party
- Los Angeles County Democratic Party

Labor unions

- AFSCME California

Organizations

- California Environmental Voters
- Equality California
- Stonewall Democrats

=== Fundraising ===
Campaign finance reports as of October 19, 2024
Candidate	Raised	Spent	Cash on hand
Lena Gonzalez (D)	$600,033	$473,888	$497,182
Mario Paz (R)	–	–	–
Source: Secretary of State of California

=== Results ===
2024 California's 33rd State Senate district election
Primary election
Party	Candidate	Votes	%
Democratic	Lena Gonzalez (incumbent)	86,226	68.6
Republican	Mario Paz	21,470	17.1
Republican	Sharifah Hardie	18,061	14.4
Total votes		125,757	100.0
General election
Democratic	Lena Gonzalez (incumbent)	217,560	69.9
Republican	Mario Paz	93,574	30.1
Total votes		311,134	100.0
Democratic hold			

== District 35 ==
2024 California's 35th State Senate district election
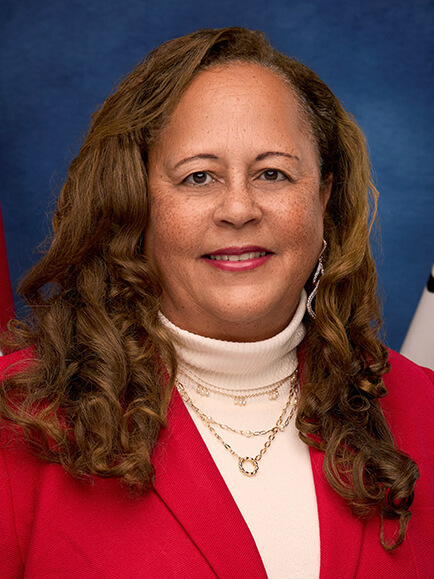

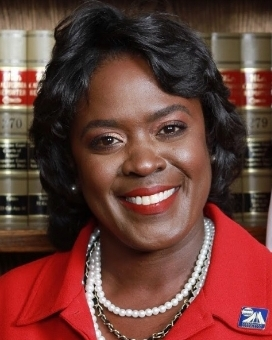
Candidate	Laura Richardson	Michelle Chambers
Party	Democratic	Democratic
Popular vote	122,862	120,144
Percentage	50.6%	49.4%
State senator before election
Steven Bradford
Democratic
Elected State senator
Laura Richardson
Democratic

The 35th district consisted of the southwestern Los Angeles County communities of Inglewood, Hawthorne, Lawndale, Westmont, Willowbrook, Compton, and Carson, and the Los Angeles neighborhoods of Watts, Harbor City, Wilmington, and San Pedro. The incumbent was Democrat Steven Bradford of Gardena, who was term-limited in 2024.

=== Candidates ===
- Michelle Chambers (Democratic), former Compton city councilor
- Lamar Lyons (Democratic), financial consultant
- Nilo Vega Michelin (Democratic), El Camino College trustee and high school history teacher
- Alex Monteiro (Democratic), Hawthorne city councilor
- Laura Richardson (Democratic), former U.S. representative for California's 37th congressional district (2007–2013)
- Albert Robles (Democratic), former mayor of Carson (2014–2020)
- James Spencer (Republican), environmental consultant
- Jennifer Trichelle-Marie Williams (Democratic), member of the Los Angeles County Citizens Economy and Efficiency Commission

==== Withdrawn ====
- Darryn Harris (Democratic), former chief of staff to then-U.S. Representative Karen Bass

=== Endorsements ===
Michelle Chambers (D)

State senators

- Steven Bradford, SD-35 (2012–2024)
- Lena Gonzalez, SD-33 (2019–present)
- Josh Newman, SD-29 (2016–2024)
- Lola Smallwood-Cuevas, SD-28 (2022–present)

State assemblymembers

- Tina McKinnor, AD-61 (2022–present)

Labor unions

- California Faculty Association

Newspapers

- Los Angeles Sentinel

Organizations

- California Environmental Voters
- Equality California
- Stonewall Democrats
James Spencer (R)

Political parties

- California Republican Party
Declined to endorse

Political parties

- California Democratic Party

=== Fundraising ===
Campaign finance reports as of October 19, 2024
Candidate	Raised	Spent	Cash on hand
Michelle Chambers (D)	$625,121	$705,104	$43,301
Laura Richardson (D)	$660,969	$427,784	$149,220
Source: Secretary of State of California

=== Results ===
2024 California's 35th State Senate district election
Primary election
Party	Candidate	Votes	%
Democratic	Laura Richardson	26,916	27.8
Democratic	Michelle Chambers	23,670	24.5
Republican	James Spencer	18,193	18.8
Democratic	Albert Robles	8,263	8.5
Democratic	Alex Monteiro	5,840	6.0
Democratic	Jennifer Trichelle-Marie Williams	5,242	5.4
Democratic	Nilo Vega Michelin	4,628	4.8
Democratic	Lamar Lyons	3,959	4.1
Total votes		96,711	100.0
General election
Democratic	Laura Richardson	122,862	50.6
Democratic	Michelle Chambers	120,144	49.4
Total votes		243,006	100.0
Democratic hold			

== District 37 ==
2024 California's 37th State Senate district election
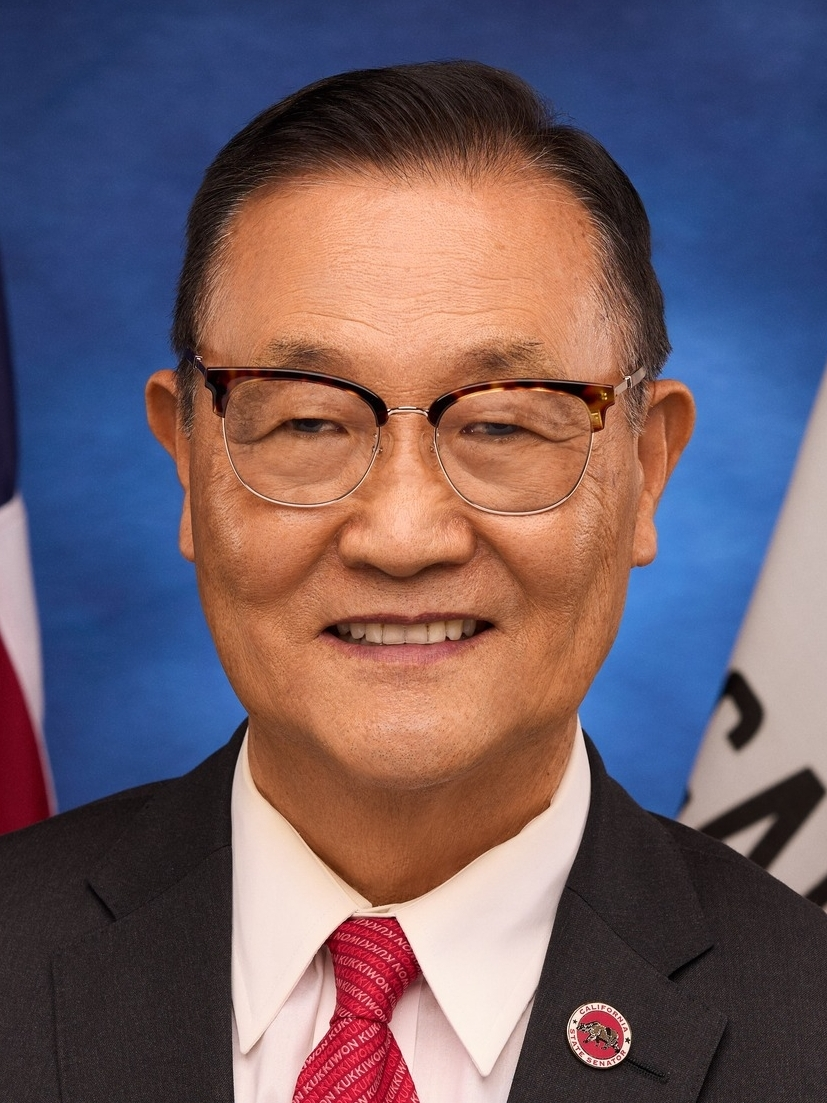

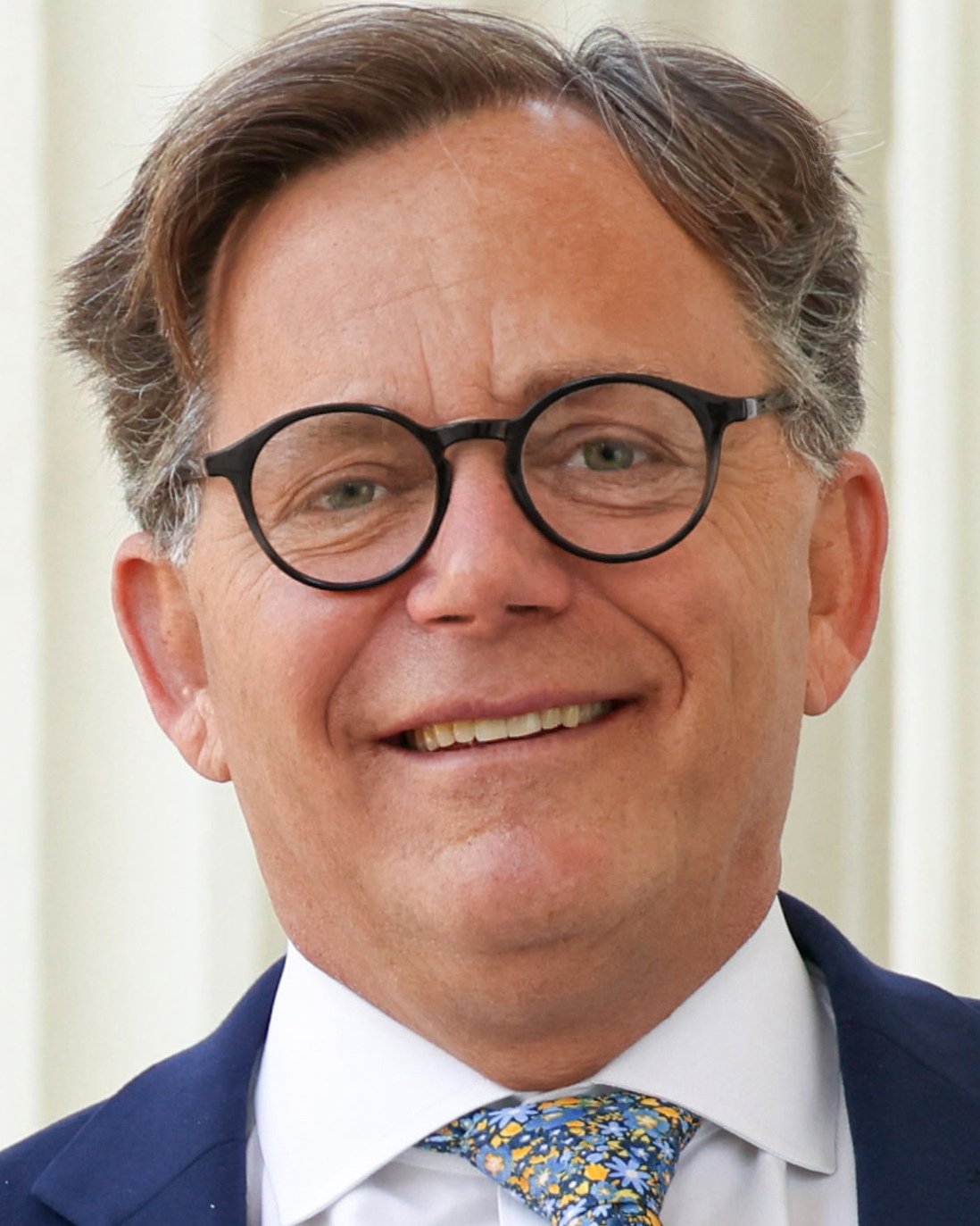
Candidate	Steven Choi	Josh Newman
Party	Republican	Democratic
Popular vote	232,345	226,270
Percentage	50.7%	49.3%
State senator before election
Josh Newman (Democratic)
Dave Min (Democratic)
Elected State senator
Steven Choi
Republican

The new 37th district encompassed much of central Orange County, including Orange, El Modena, Villa Park. Tustin, Irvine, Costa Mesa, Lake Forest, El Toro, Laguna Woods, Aliso Viejo, and Laguna Niguel. The incumbents in this area were second-term Democrat Josh Newman of Fullerton and the former 29th district, and first-term Democrat Dave Min of Irvine and the former 37th district.

=== Candidates ===
- Gabrielle Ashbaugh (Democratic), business owner
- Steven Choi (Republican), former state assemblyman for the 68th district (2016–2022) and former mayor of Irvine (2012–2016)
- Leticia Correa (Democratic), neuro-surgery technologist
- Jacob Niles Creer (Democratic), surgical coordinator
- Anthony Kuo (Republican), former Irvine city councilor (2018–2022)
- Stephanie Le (Democratic), medical authorization coordinator
- Crystal Miles (Republican), Villa Park city councilor
- Alex Mohajer (Democratic), president of Stonewall Democrats
- Josh Newman (Democratic), state senator for the 29th district (2016–2018, 2020–2024)
- Guy Selleck (Republican), business owner and U.S. Air Force veteran
- Jenny Suarez (Democratic), respiratory therapist

==== Withdrawn ====
- Ali Kowsari (Republican), business professor at Santa Ana College

==== Declined ====
- Dave Min (Democratic), incumbent state senator for the 37th district (2020–2024) (ran for U.S. House)

=== Endorsements ===
Alex Mohajer (D)

Political parties

- California Working Families Party

Organizations

- Stonewall Democrats
Josh Newman (D)

Political parties

- California Democratic Party
- Orange County Democratic Party

Labor unions

- California Faculty Association

Organizations

- Equality California
Guy Selleck (R)

Political parties

- American Independent Party
Steven Choi (R)

Newspapers

- Orange County Register

Political parties

- California Republican Party

=== Fundraising ===
Campaign finance reports as of October 19, 2024
Candidate	Raised	Spent	Cash on hand
Josh Newman (D)	$5,116,336	$5,522,882	$319,628
Steven Choi (R)	$464,923	$452,491	$84,839
Source: Secretary of State of California

=== Results ===
2024 California's 37th State Senate district election
Primary election
Party	Candidate	Votes	%
Democratic	Josh Newman (incumbent)	67,109	30.1
Republican	Steven Choi	48,364	21.7
Republican	Crystal Miles	31,132	14.0
Republican	Guy Selleck	22,546	10.1
Democratic	Alex Mohajer	18,550	8.3
Republican	Anthony Kuo	15,739	7.1
Democratic	Leticia Correa	6,000	2.7
Democratic	Stephanie Le	4,532	2.0
Democratic	Gabrielle Ashbaugh	4,396	2.0
Democratic	Jenny Suarez	3,191	1.4
Democratic	Jacob Niles Creer	1,606	0.7
Total votes		223,165	100.0
General election
Republican	Steven Choi	232,345	50.7
Democratic	Josh Newman (incumbent)	226,270	49.3
Total votes		458,615	100.0
Republican gain from Democratic			

== District 39 ==
2024 California's 39th State Senate district election
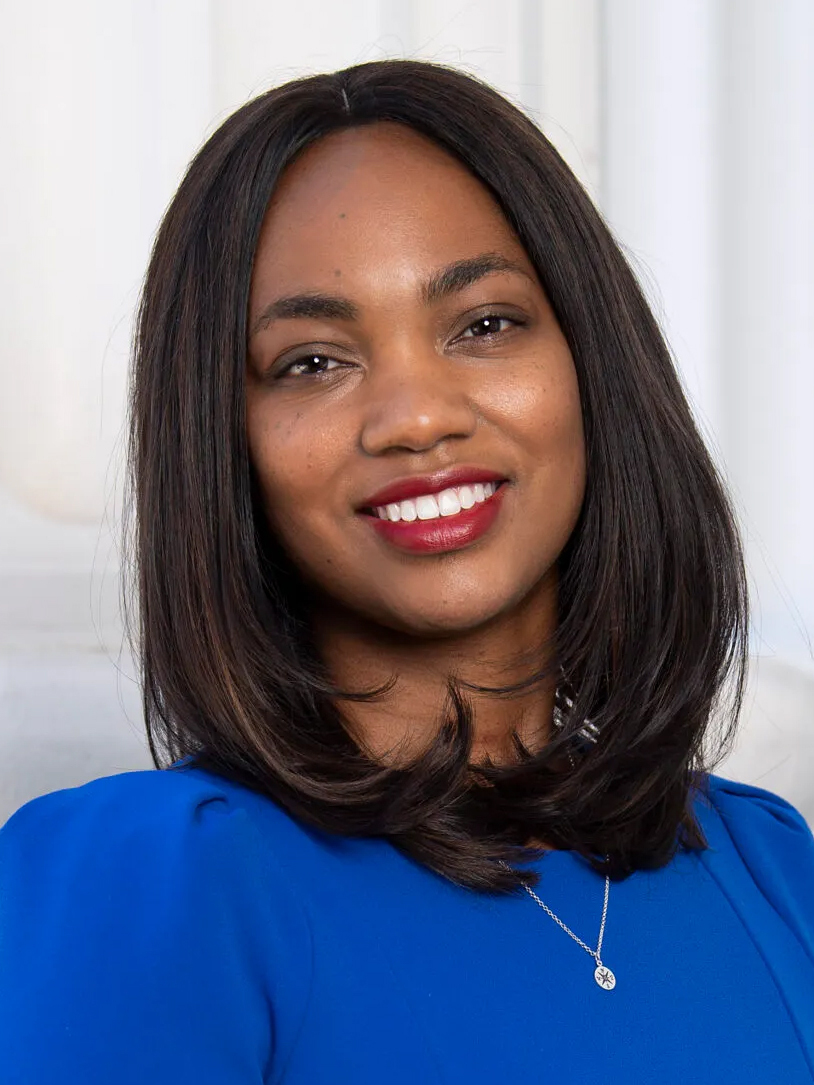

Candidate	Akilah Weber	Bob Divine
Party	Democratic	Republican
Popular vote	266,830	156,616
Percentage	63.0%	37.0%
State senator before election
Toni Atkins
Democratic
Elected State senator
Akilah Weber
Democratic

The new 39th district encompassed much of San Diego, including the neighborhoods of Point Loma, Ocean Beach, Hillcrest, North Park, Linda Vista, San Carlos, Encanto, and Paradise Hills, along with the San Diego suburbs of Coronado, La Mesa, Lemon Grove, El Cajon, La Presa, Casa de Oro, Rancho San Diego, Bostonia, and Crest. The incumbent was Democrat Toni Atkins, who was term-limited in 2024.

=== Candidates ===
- Bob Divine (Republican), retiree
- Akilah Weber (Democratic), state assemblywoman for the 79th district (2021–2024)

==== Withdrawn ====
- Nathan Fletcher (Democratic), chair of the San Diego County Board of Supervisors and former Republican state assemblyman (2008–2012)

=== Endorsements ===
Bob Divine (R)

Political parties

- American Independent Party
Akilah Weber (D)

State government officials

- Eleni Kounalakis, lieutenant governor of California (2019–present)

Political parties

- California Democratic Party
- San Diego County Democratic Party

Labor unions

- AFSCME California
- California Faculty Association

Organizations

- Equality California

=== Fundraising ===
Campaign finance reports as of October 19, 2024
Candidate	Raised	Spent	Cash on hand
Akilah Weber (D)	$415,491	$632,472	$577,651
Bob Divine (R)	–	–	–
Source: Secretary of State of California

=== Results ===
2024 California's 39th State Senate district election
Primary election
Party	Candidate	Votes	%
Democratic	Akilah Weber	121,647	60.7
Republican	Bob Divine	78,637	39.3
Total votes		200,284	100.0
General election
Democratic	Akilah Weber	266,830	63.0
Republican	Bob Divine	156,616	37.0
Total votes		423,446	100.0
Democratic hold			

== See also ==
- 2024 California elections
- 2024 California State Assembly election
