= 2024 California's 47th congressional district election =

- November 5, 2024
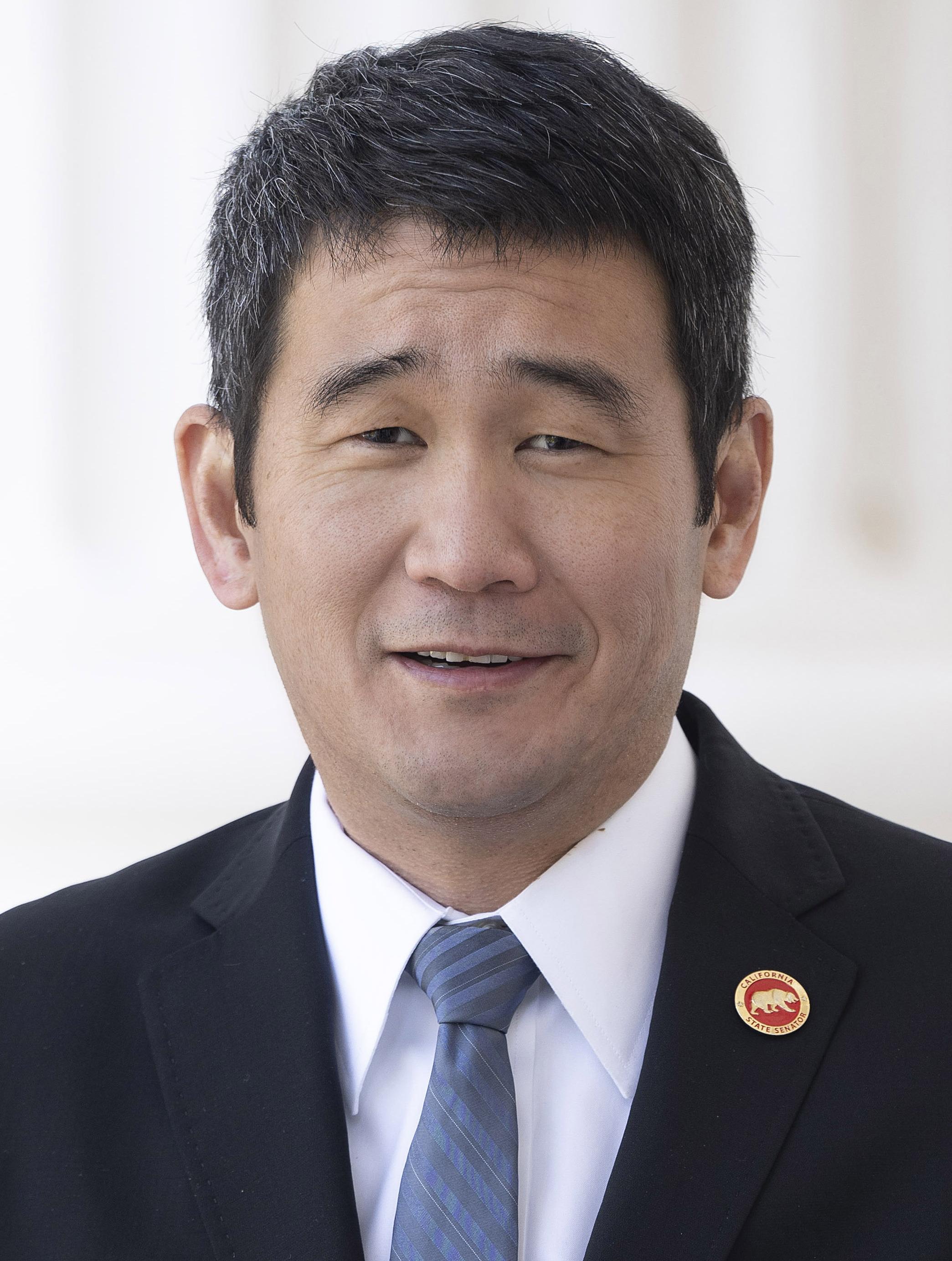

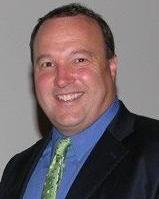
Candidate	Dave Min	Scott Baugh
Party	Democratic	Republican
Popular vote	181,655	171,501
Percentage	51.44%	48.56%
- Min: 50–60% 60–70% 70–80% 80–90% >90% Baugh: 50–60% 60–70% 70–80% 80–90% No votes
U.S. Representative before election
Katie Porter
Democratic
Elected U.S. Representative
Dave Min
Democratic

The 2024 California's 47th congressional district election was held on November 5, 2024, to elect the United States representative for California's 47th congressional district, concurrently with elections for the other U.S. House districts in California and the rest of the country, the 2024 U.S. Senate race in California, other elections to the United States Senate, and various state and local elections. The primary election was held on March 5, 2024, concurrently with the Super Tuesday presidential primaries. The Southern California-based 47th district is centered in Orange County and includes the cities of Costa Mesa, Huntington Beach, Irvine, Newport Beach, and Seal Beach, as well as portions of Laguna Beach, Laguna Hills, and Laguna Woods.

The incumbent was Democrat Katie Porter, who was re-elected with 51.7% of the vote in 2022. She did not seek re-election, instead choosing to run for the U.S. Senate. Porter was first elected in 2018, unseating incumbent Republican Mimi Walters. She later gained national fame for her progressive politics, and frequently went viral for grilling corporate executives during congressional hearings. During the primary elections, AIPAC spent an unprecedented $4.6 million against Min.

The general election pitted former state assemblyman Scott Baugh, a Republican, against state senator Dave Min, a Democrat. Candidates eliminated in the primary election included Democratic attorney Joanna Weiss and Republican businessman Max Ukropina.

The race was expected to be highly competitive as it is a slightly blue suburban district with no incumbent. Both House Democrats and House Republicans listed California's 47th district among their highest-priority districts in the 2024 election. Democrat Joe Biden won the district with 54.5% of the vote in the 2020 presidential election.

On the night of November 12, 2024, after a week of counting and an estimate of 86% of the vote reporting, Baugh conceded the race to Min, who was leading with 50.9% of the vote at the time.

== Primary election ==
=== Candidates ===
==== Advanced to general ====
- Scott Baugh (Republican), former minority leader of the California state assembly, former chair of the Orange County Republican Party, and runner-up for this district in 2022
- Dave Min (Democratic), state senator and candidate for this district (Note: This district was numbered as the 45th district prior to the 2020 redistricting cycle.) in 2018

==== Eliminated in primary ====
- Terry Crandall (no party preference), Santa Ana College economics professor
- Tom McGrath (no party preference), chemical engineer
- Long Pham (Republican), former member of the Orange County Department of Education Board of Directors and perennial candidate
- Boyd Roberts (Democratic), realtor and perennial candidate
- Bill Smith (no party preference), retired attorney
- Max Ukropina (Republican), businessman and former aide to U.S. Representatives John Campbell and David Valadao
- Joanna Weiss (Democratic), attorney and law professor
- Shariq Zaidi (Democratic), security guard

==== Withdrawn ====
- Julia Hashemieh (Republican), outpatient surgery company CEO
- Dom Jones (Democratic), gym owner and The Amazing Race 34 contestant (ran for state assembly)
- Harley Rouda (Democratic), former U.S. Representative (endorsed Weiss)
- Mike Schaefer, member of the California State Board of Equalization from the 4th district (2019–present) (ran for U.S. Senate in Nevada)

==== Declined ====
- Katrina Foley (Democratic), Orange County supervisor (endorsed Rouda, then Weiss)
- Josh Newman (Democratic), state senator (ran for re-election)
- Katie Porter (Democratic), incumbent U.S. representative (ran for U.S. Senate, endorsed Min)

=== Endorsements ===
Scott Baugh (R)

U.S. representatives

- Kevin McCarthy, U.S. representative from CA-22 (2009–2023) and former speaker of the House (2023)
- Tom McClintock, U.S. representative from CA-5 (2009–present)
- Steve Scalise, U.S. representative from LA-01 (2008–present) and House majority leader (2023–present)
- Michelle Steel, U.S. representative from CA-45 (2021–present)

State legislators

- Diane Dixon, AD-72 (2022–present)
- Janet Nguyen, SD-36 (2022–present)

Local officials

- Mike Carroll, Irvine city councilor (2020–present)
- Carl DeMaio, former San Diego city councilor (2008–2012)
- Donald P. Wagner, chair of the Orange County Board of Supervisors (2023–present) from the 3rd district (2019–present)

Political parties

- California Republican Party

Organizations

- California College Republicans
- California ProLife Council
- California Rifle and Pistol Association (co-endorsement with Pham)
- Club for Growth
- Howard Jarvis Taxpayers Association PAC
- National Rifle Association Political Victory Fund
Long Pham (R)

Organizations

- California Rifle and Pistol Association (co-endorsement with Baugh)
Dave Min (D)

U.S. representatives

- Judy Chu, CA-28 (2009–present)
- Andy Kim, NJ-3 (2019–present)
- Grace Meng, NY-9 (2013–present)
- Kevin Mullin, CA-15 (2023–present)
- Scott Peters, CA-50 (2013–present)
- Katie Porter, CA-47 (2019–present)
- Mark Takano, CA-41 (2013–present)

Statewide officials

- Rob Bonta, attorney general of California (2021–present)
- Eleni Kounalakis, lieutenant governor of California (2019–present) (co-endorsement with Weiss)
- Ricardo Lara, California insurance commissioner (2019–present)
- Fiona Ma, California state treasurer (2019–present)
- Tony Thurmond, California state superintendent of public instruction (2019–present)

State legislators

- 24 state senators
- 33 state assemblymembers

Individuals

- Sal Rosselli, president of National Union of Healthcare Workers

Newspapers and other media

- Los Angeles Times (primary only)

Political parties

- California Democratic Party
- Orange County Democratic Party

Organizations

- AAPI Victory Fund
- Asian American Action Fund
- ASPIRE PAC
- California Environmental Voters
- Democrats of Greater Irvine
- Emgage PAC
- League of Conservation Voters
- Sierra Club
- Vote Common Good

Labor unions

- American Federation of State, County and Municipal Employees California
- American Federation of Teachers and California Federation of Teachers
- Association for Los Angeles Deputy Sheriffs
- California Labor Federation
- International Brotherhood of Electrical Workers Local 47 and 441
- International Brotherhood of Teamsters District Joint Council 42
- International Union of Painters and Allied Trades District Council 36
- Los Angeles Police Protective League
- National Education Association
- National Union of Healthcare Workers
- Orange County Employees Association
- Orange County Labor Federation
- Service Employees International Union
- United Food and Commercial Workers Local 324
Max Ukropina (R)

Political parties

- American Independent Party
Joanna Weiss (D)

U.S. representatives

- Julia Brownley, U.S. representative from California's 26th congressional district (2013–present)
- Lois Frankel, U.S. representative from Florida's 22nd congressional district (2013–present)
- Josh Harder, U.S. representative from California's 9th congressional district (2019–present)
- Sydney Kamlager-Dove, U.S. representative from California's 37th congressional district (2023–present)
- Harley Rouda, former U.S. representative from California's 48th congressional district (2019–2021)
- Eric Swalwell, U.S. representative from California's 14th congressional district (2013–present)

Statewide officials

- Eleni Kounalakis, lieutenant governor of California (2019–present) (co-endorsement with Min)

State assemblymembers

- Cottie Petrie-Norris, AD-73 (2018–present)

Local officials

- Katrina Foley, Orange County supervisor from the 5th district (2021–present) (previously endorsed Rouda)

Organizations

- Democratic Majority for Israel
- EMILY's List
- Feminist Majority PAC
- National Women's Political Caucus
- NewDem Action Fund
- Pro-Israel America
Dom Jones (D) (withdrawn)

Individuals

- Howie Klein, former president of Reprise Records (1989–2001) and adjunct professor at McGill University
Harley Rouda (D) (withdrawn)

U.S. representatives

- Madeleine Dean, U.S. representative from Pennsylvania's 4th congressional district (2019–present)
- John Garamendi, U.S. representative from California's 8th congressional district (2009–present)
- Jim McGovern, U.S. representative from Massachusetts's 2nd congressional district (1997–present)
- Dean Phillips, U.S. representative from Minnesota's 3rd congressional district (2019–present)
- Max Rose, former U.S. representative from New York's 11th congressional district (2019–2021)
- Mikie Sherrill, U.S. representative from New Jersey's 11th congressional district (2019–present)
- David Trone, U.S. representative from Maryland's 6th congressional district (2019–present)

Local officials

- ~~Katrina Foley, Orange County supervisor from the 5th district (2021–present)~~ (switched endorsement to Weiss after Rouda withdrew)

=== Polling ===
Poll source	Date(s) administered	Sample size (Note: Key: A – all adults RV – registered voters LV – likely voters V – unclear)	Margin of error	Scott Baugh (R)	Dave Min (D)	Max Ukropina (R)	Joanna Weiss (D)	Other	Undecided
WPA Intelligence (R) (Note: Poll conducted for Baugh's campaign)	February 12–14, 2024	366 (LV)	± 5.1%	27%	22%	9%	16%	9%	17%
RMG Research (Note: Poll sponsored by U.S. Term Limits)	November 14–19, 2023	300 (LV)	± 5.7%	17%	12%	4%	7%	4% (Note: "Someone else" with 4%; "Would not vote" with 0%)	56%

=== Fundraising ===
Campaign finance reports as of February 14, 2024
Candidate	Raised	Spent	Cash on hand
Dave Min (D)	$1,731,136	$1,507,057	$224,079
Boyd Roberts (D)	$6,762	$8,369	$0
Joanna Weiss (D)	$2,151,268 (Note: $225,000 of this total was self-funded by Weiss)	$1,538,667	$612,601
Scott Baugh (R)	$2,010,374	$313,132	$1,707,928
Max Ukropina (R)	$595,201	$436,787	$158,414
Terry Crandall (NPP)	$13,985	$12,461	$1,523
Tom McGrath (NPP)	$14,033	$8,895	$5,138
Bill Smith (NPP)	$15,000 (Note: $15,000 of this total was self-funded by Weiss)	$7,770	$7,230
Source: Federal Election Commission

=== Results ===
2024 California's 47th congressional district primary
Party	Candidate	Votes	%
Republican	Scott Baugh	49,799	32.8
Democratic	Dave Min	39,080	25.7
Democratic	Joanna Weiss	28,948	19.0
Republican	Max Ukropina	22,729	15.0
Republican	Long Pham	4,195	2.8
No party preference	Terry Crandall	2,400	1.6
Democratic	Boyd Roberts	2,012	1.3
No party preference	Tom McGrath	1,321	0.9
No party preference	Bill Smith	902	0.6
Democratic	Shariq Zaidi	672	0.4
Total votes		152,058	100.0

== General election ==
=== Predictions ===
Source	Ranking	As of
Cook Political Report	Lean D	February 2, 2023
Inside Elections	Tossup	March 10, 2023
Sabato's Crystal Ball	Lean D	September 19, 2024
Elections Daily	Lean R (flip)	November 4, 2024
CNalysis	Lean D	November 4, 2024

=== Post-primary endorsements ===
Dave Min (D)

U.S. representatives

- Adam Schiff, CA-30 (2001–present)

Statewide officials

- Gavin Newsom, governor of California (2019–present)

Newspapers

- Los Angeles Times

Organizations

- Congressional Progressive Caucus
- DCCC Red to Blue
- Democratic Majority for Israel
- Emgage PAC
- End Citizens United
- Everytown for Gun Safety
- League of Conservation Voters
- Natural Resources Defense Council
- Our Revolution
- Reproductive Freedom for All
Scott Baugh (R)

Newspapers

- Orange County Register

Organizations

- Congressional Leadership Fund
- National Federation of Independent Business
- National Rifle Association Political Victory Fund

=== Polling ===
Poll source	Date(s) administered	Sample size	Margin of error	Dave Min (D)	Scott Baugh (R)	Undecided
WPA Intelligence (R)	October 17–18, 2024	401 (LV)	± 4.9%	40%	43%	17%
WPA Intelligence (R)	September 24–26, 2024	–	–	45%	42%	13%
USC/CSU	September 14–21, 2024	525 (LV)	± 4.3%	46%	49%	5% (Note: "Won't vote" with 1%)
Public Policy Polling (D) (Note: Poll conducted for Weiss's campaign)	October 24–30, 2023	500 (LV)	± 4.4%	42%	43%	15%
Public Policy Polling (D) (Note: Poll conducted for Min's campaign)	June 14–15, 2023	555 (LV)	± 4.2%	37%	39%	24%

Hypothetical polling

Scott Baugh vs. Joanna Weiss

Poll source	Date(s) administered	Sample size	Margin of error	Joanna Weiss (D)	Scott Baugh (R)	Undecided
Public Policy Polling (D)	October 24–30, 2023	500 (LV)	± 4.4%	43%	42%	15%

=== Results ===
2024 California's 47th congressional district election
Party	Candidate	Votes	%	±%
Democratic	Dave Min	181,721	51.44%	−0.28
Republican	Scott Baugh	171,554	48.56%	+0.28
Total votes		353,275	100.00%	N/A
Democratic hold				

==== By county ====
County	Dave Min Democratic		Scott Baugh Republican		Margin		Total votes cast
County	#	%	#	%	#	%	Total votes cast
Orange (part)	181,721	51.44%	171,554	48.56%	10,167	2.88%	353,275
Totals	181,721	51.44%	171,554	48.56%	10,167	2.88%	353,275
