= List of places in California (U) =

List of places in California - U

This list of current:

- cities
- towns, unincorporated communities
- counties, and other recognized places in the U.S. state of California.

Information on the number and names of counties in which the place lies, and its lower and upper ZIP Code bounds, if applicable are also included.

Name of place	Number of counties	Principal county	Lower zip code	Upper zip code
Ukiah	1	Mendocino County	95482	
Ulmar	1	Alameda County	94550	
Ultra	1	Tulare County		
Una	1	Kern County		
Underwood Park	1	Mendocino County		
Union	1	Napa County		
Union City	1	Alameda County	94587	
Union Hill	1	Nevada County	95945	
Union Hill	1	Sierra County		
Union Mills	1	Nevada County		
Universal City	1	Los Angeles County	91608	
University	1	Orange County	92716	
University	1	Santa Barbara County	93107	
University City	1	San Diego County	92122	
University Heights	1	San Diego County		
University Heights	1	San Mateo County	94025	
University of California-Davis Campus	1	Yolo County	95616	
University of California Irvine	1	Orange County	92697	
University of California Los Angeles	1	Los Angeles County	90095	
University of California Riverside	1	Riverside County	92521	
University of California San Diego	1	San Diego County	92093	
University of Santa Clara	1	Santa Clara County	95050	
University of Southern California	1	Los Angeles County	90089	
University Park	1	Orange County	92666	
Upland	1	San Bernardino County	91784	86
Upper Forni	1	El Dorado County		
Upper Lake	1	Lake County	95485	
Upper Lake Rancheria	1	Lake County		
Upper Scheelite	1	Inyo County	93514	
Upper Soda Springs	1	Siskiyou County	96025	
Upper Town	1	Mono County		
Upton	1	Siskiyou County		
Uptown	1	San Bernardino County	92405	
Urbita Springs	1	San Bernardino County		
Urgon	1	San Joaquin County		
Uva	1	Fresno County		
