= Midway, Alameda County, California =

Unincorporated community in California, United States

Midway
- Unincorporated community
- Location in California Midway (the United States)
- Coordinates: 37°42′53″N 121°33′29″W
- Country: United States
- State: California
- County: Alameda
- Elevation: 358 ft (109 m)

Midway is an unincorporated community in Alameda County, California, United States, 6 miles (9.7 km) south-southeast of Altamont. It lies at an elevation of 358 feet (109 m). A post office operated in Midway from 1870 to 1918.
