= California Faculty Association =

Labor union in California

- Founded: 1983 (43 years ago)
- Headquarters: Sacramento, California
- Location: United States
- Members: 29,000 (as of 2019)
- Affiliations: SEIU; AAUP
- Website: Official website

The California Faculty Association (CFA) is an American labor union that represents lecturers, professors, counselors, librarians and coaches from the 23 campuses of the California State University (CSU). It is the exclusive collective bargaining agent for all faculty in the CSU system. In 2022, their annual revenue was $18.1 million.

== Structure and governance ==
CFA has a board of directors which is composed of a president, vice-president, secretary, treasurer, associate vice president of northern campuses, associate vice president of southern campuses, council representatives, lecturer representatives, and campus chapter presidents. In addition to the board of directors, CFA contains caucuses, councils, and committees that conduct aspects of CFA work and a student organization, Students for Quality Education.

== History ==
After the State Employer-Employee Relations Act of 1978 was passed in California allowing for union representation of state employees, two unions competed to become the exclusive bargaining agent of the CSU. The Congress of Faculty Associations prevailed in a close 1982 election over the United Professors of California, and then changed their name to the California Faculty Association. Prior to 1986, librarians had a dual-track system with some librarians having faculty status and others classified as staff. All librarians were incorporated as faculty when newly represented by CFA.

The Women's Caucus was CFA's first caucus, formed in the late 1990s with its first Women's Conference held in 2000. In 2002, the Latina/o and African-American causes were created. The Indigenous Peoples Caucus was formed in 2019. The first equity conference was organized in 2004 and the keynote was delivered by Justice Cruz Reynoso about CA Proposition 209 and its impact on students of color in the CSU.

In 2019, CFA disaffiliated with the California Teachers Association and the National Education Association.

On January 22, 2024, the CFA went on strike to protest low starting pay among other issues. This came after negotiations for a 12% pay increase ended with no agreement. The university leaders said that the system already spends 75% of their budget on staff compensation and that they cannot afford a 12% increase in pay. Later that day, the CFA reached a tentative agreement with the CSU system.

== Composition ==
CFA represents all California State University faculty. As of Fall 2019, the faculty were 57.1% lecturers, 37.9% tenured or tenure-track professors, 2.3% coaches and 1.2% librarians. While all faculty members are represented by CFA, only those who complete their membership applications may vote on CFA business. As of Fall 2015, 61% of all CSU Faculty are registered CFA members.
