= California Teachers Association =

California Labor Union for Teachers

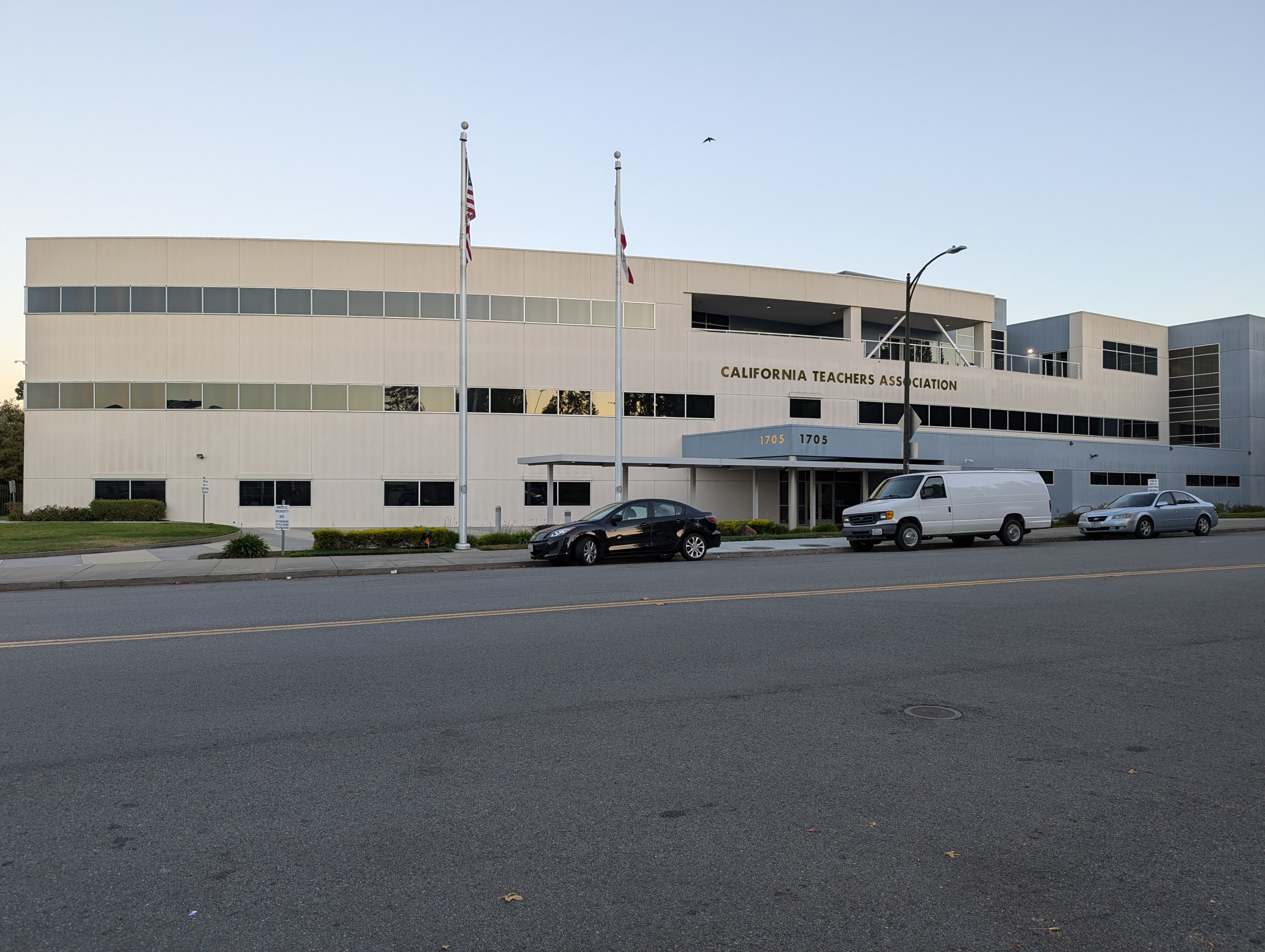
- Abbreviation: CTA
- Founded: May 1863, 163 years ago
- Headquarters: 1705 Murchison Drive; Burlingame, CA 94010
- Location: United States
- Members: 325,000
- Key people: David B. Goldberg, President
- Affiliations: National Education Association
- Website: cta.org

The California Teachers Association (CTA) is a teachers' trade union based in the city of Burlingame, California. The association was initially established in 1863. It is regarded as one of the largest and most powerful teachers' unions in the state with over 300,000 members and a high political profile in California politics. The current president of the association is David B. Goldberg.

CTA is affiliated with the National Education Association, while the California Federation of Teachers (the second largest teachers' union in the state) is affiliated with the American Federation of Teachers.

== History ==
CTA's Governmental Affairs Office (Sacramento, CA)

In 1854, in response to a call from the California Superintendent of Public Instruction, John Swett, for a "teachers' institute", the first California State Teachers Convention was held in San Francisco. The event soon became a regular occurrence, being again held in 1861, 1862, and 1863. These institutes saw generally low attendance, typically fewer than a hundred teachers, all of them male. During the 1863 institute, the California Educational Society was formed. On June 10, 1875 at the California State Normal School (now San Jose State University), after the California Educational Society had become largely defunct, the organization reoriented itself and changed its name to the California Teachers Association.

CTA won its first major legislative victory in 1866 with a law providing free public schools to California children. A year later, public funding was secured for schools that educated nonwhite students. More early victories for organized labor established bans on using public school funding for sectarian religious purposes (1878–79); free textbooks for all students in grades 1-8 (1911); the first teacher tenure and due process law (1912); and a statewide pension, the California State Teachers’ Retirement System (1913).

While the National Labor Relations Act of 1935 made collective bargaining a lawful, protected activity in the private sector, it did not include public workers or teachers. Wisconsin passed the nation's first public employee bargaining law (1959), and several large, urban affiliates of NEA or the American Federation of Teachers started winning bargaining rights (New York in 1961, Denver in 1962, Chicago in 1966). After a decade of school strikes and teacher organizing, California K-14 educators won the right to bargain collectively in 1975 when the CTA-sponsored Educational Employment Relations Act, also known as the Rodda Act, was signed into law by Gov. Jerry Brown.

A turning point in CTA's history came in 1988. That was the year teachers fought to pass Proposition 98, the landmark state law guaranteeing about 40 percent of the state's general fund for schools and community colleges.
