= Consumer Attorneys of California =

- Purpose: Consumer Advocacy
- Location: California
- Members: 3,000 lawyers
- Key people: Nancy Drabble, CEO
- Formerly called: California Trial Lawyers Association

Consumer Attorneys of California (CAOC) is a professional trade organization consisting of more than 3,000 California lawyers who represent the interests of consumers as plaintiffs in civil tort actions and in the California Legislature.

== Overview ==
The organization's lawyer members support access to justice by representing plaintiffs in civil litigation on a contingency-based fee system. According to the Consumer Attorneys of California, its members represent individuals harmed by misconduct by corporate and government entities with greater access to resources. Up until 1995, it was known as the California Trial Lawyers Association.

== Recognition ==
The organization's longtime CEO is Nancy Drabble, who, in 2022, was recognized for her efforts to help bring about a compromise between different interest groups for doctors, lawyers, and insurance companies, to help pass legislation that adjusts the cap on non-economic damages in medical malpractice cases for inflation under the Medical Injury Compensation Reform Act (MICRA).

== See also ==
- American Association for Justice
