= Hodge, California =

Unincorporated community in California, United States

- Unincorporated community
- Location within California Location within the United States
- Coordinates: 34°48′56″N 117°11′36″W
- Country: United States
- State: California
- County: San Bernardino
- Elevation: 2,283 ft (696 m)
- Time zone: UTC-8 (Pacific (PST))
  - Summer (DST): UTC-7 (PDT)
- Area codes: 442/760
- GNIS feature ID: 243498

Hodge is an unincorporated community in the Mojave Desert, within San Bernardino County, California, United States.

Hodge is located along historic U.S. Route 66 and the Mojave River, 11 miles (18 km) southwest of Barstow and north of the Victor Valley.

== History ==
The settlement was named after ranch owners Gilbert and Robert Hodge. Hodge was a railroad station, supplying water from wells into the usually subterranean Mojave River. It was a desert stop on U.S. Route 66 between Barstow and Victorville. By 1952 Hodge was no longer active until new houses were built in the late 1980s.
