= Altamont, California =

Unincorporated community in California, United States

Altamont
- Unincorporated community
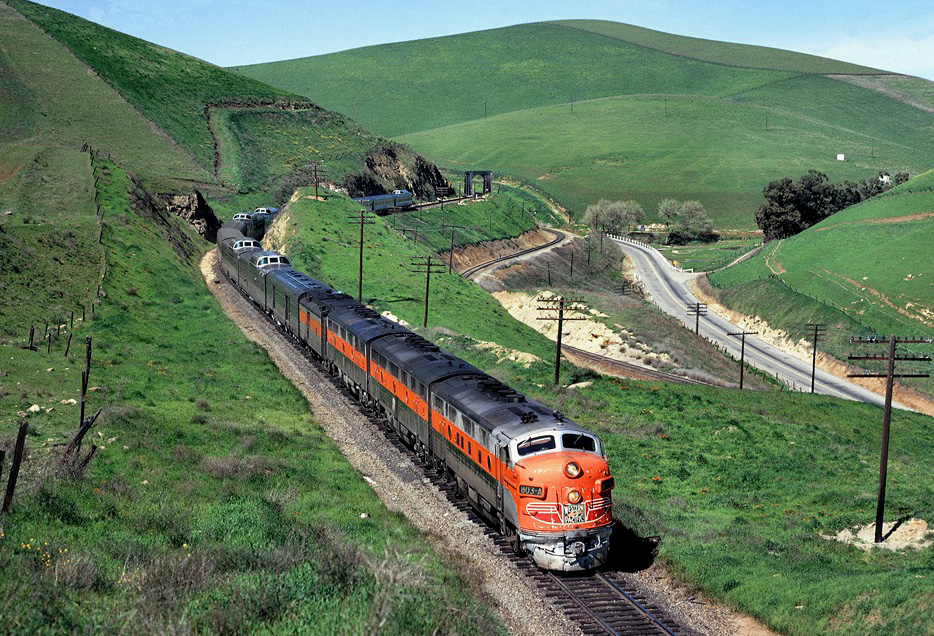

- Location in California Altamont (the United States)
- Coordinates: 37°44′38″N 121°39′46″W
- Country: United States
- State: California
- County: Alameda
- Elevation: 741 ft (226 m)

Altamont is an unincorporated community in Alameda County, California, United States. It is located 7.5 miles (12 km) northeast of Livermore, at an elevation of 741 feet (226 m) in the Altamont Pass. Originally called The Summit, the name was changed to Altamont when the Central Pacific Railroad arrived in 1869.

== History ==
Altamont is derived from its former name Alta Monte (Spanish for "High Mountain"). The community was also briefly known as The Summit.

A post office operated at Altamont from 1872 to 1955.
