= California Federation of Teachers =

Teachers' union in California

The California Federation of Teachers is a teachers' union in California, United States. It represents more than 120,000 educational employees. It is affiliated with American Federation of Teachers and the AFL-CIO.

The Federation is one of two main teachers' unions in California. The other is the California Teachers Association.

The California Federation of Teachers is a major ballot spender in California politics.
