= Ulmar, Livermore, California =

Unincorporated community in California, United States

Ulmar
- Former unincorporated community Neighborhood of Livermore
- Location in California Ulmar (the United States)
- Coordinates: 37°42′11.0″N 121°42′54.1″W
- Country: United States
- State: California
- County: Alameda County
- City: Livermore, California
- Elevation: 551 ft (168 m)

Ulmar (formerly Ulmar Siding) is a neighborhood of the city of Livermore in Alameda County, California. Prior to its annexation into Livermore, Ulmar was an unincorporated community. It lies at an elevation of 551 feet (168 m). This former railway siding had a median estimated home value of $777,110 for 2017-2022.
