= California Environmental Voters =

Environmental lobbying and education group

- Type: 501(c)(4) with associated political action committee
- Purpose: Environmental advocacy
- Region served: California
- CEO: Mary Creasman
- Website: envirovoters.org
- Formerly called: California League of Conservation Voters (CLCV)

California Environmental Voters (also called EnviroVoters), formerly the California League of Conservation Voters (CLCV), is a lobbying and educational organization which focuses on environmental issues affecting California. It is affiliated with the League of Conservation Voters, a national organization.

Organized as a 501(c)(4), the organization's mission is to protect California's environmental quality by increasing public awareness of the environmental performance of all elected officials, working to elect environmentally responsible candidates, and holding them accountable to the environmental agenda once elected.

== Strategies ==
At the end of each legislative year, California Environmental Voters publishes the California Environmental Scorecard. The Scorecard, which California Environmental Voters describes as "the definitive barometer of environmental politics in Sacramento", rates the performance of the California State Legislature and the governor on key environmental legislation. The Scorecard is distributed to 35,000 California Environmental Voters members, other environmental organizations, and the news media. California Environmental Voters has also awarded an Environmental Leadership Award, which in 2003 went to Nancy Pelosi.

California Environmental Voters conducts research on candidates in order to make electoral endorsements. They assist endorsed candidates with media, fundraising, and grassroots organizing strategies and campaign to educate voters about candidates' environmental records. California Environmental Voters also works with local Leagues of Conservation Voters groups to elect environmental candidates at the local level.

California Environmental Voters campaigns for environmental legislation in Sacramento in collaboration with the greater environmental community. The organization maintains a lobbying presence in Sacramento.

== Affiliations ==
The California Environmental Voters Board of Directors and staff often become officials in California state government, and vice versa. Recent board members include former Cal/EPA Secretary Winston Hickox; former Department of Resources Secretary, Clinton EPA appointee, and current California Air Resources Board chair Mary Nichols; and former Assemblymember (and current Santa Cruz County Treasurer) Fred Keeley (D-Santa Cruz). Former Assemblymember Paul Koretz (D-West Hollywood) is a former staff member of the organization.

The organization does work similar to that of the League of Conservation Voters (LCV) at the federal level. California Environmental Voters is affiliated with the State Capacity Building Division of the LCV, which works to strengthen state organizations of this type and was formerly known as the Federation of State Conservation Voter Leagues. Established in 1972, the California branch is the largest and oldest such state-level branch.

== History ==
The group renamed itself "California Environmental Voters" and "EnviroVoters" in 2021 to more accurately reflect the group's expanded goal of fighting climate change.

In 2022, the group gave California a "D" grade for the first time.

== See also ==
- League of Conservation Voters
